= 2020 New Zealand cannabis referendum =

- 17 October 2020
- Do you support the proposed Cannabis Legalisation and Control Bill?

Results
Choice	Votes	%
Yes	1,406,973	48.83%
No	1,474,635	51.17%
Valid votes	2,881,608	99.09%
Invalid or blank votes	26,463	0.91%
Total votes	2,908,071	100.00%
Registered voters/turnout	3,549,564	81.93%
- Results by electorate.

The 2020 New Zealand cannabis referendum was a non-binding referendum held on 17 October 2020 in conjunction with the 2020 general election and a euthanasia referendum, on the question of whether to legalise the sale, use, possession and production of recreational cannabis. It was rejected by New Zealand voters. The form of the referendum was a vote for or against the proposed "Cannabis Legalisation and Control Bill". Official results were released by the Electoral Commission on 6 November 2020 with 50.7% of voters opposing the legalisation and 48.4% in support. (Note: The remainder of ballots returned were invalid or blank.)

The results of the cannabis referendum would not have affected the legal status of medicinal cannabis or licensed hemp production, both of which were already legal. They would also not have affected laws regarding driving under the influence of drugs, or workplace health and safety (e.g. being under the influence of cannabis at work).

== Background ==
Cannabis has been illegal in New Zealand since 1927. Historically, neither of the two biggest political parties in New Zealand, Labour or National, have tried to decriminalise or legalise cannabis. The Green Party, which has advocated for drug law reform for many years, secured a commitment to hold a referendum after the 2017 election as part of its confidence and supply agreement with Labour. This agreement followed statements made by the Green Party in December 2016, that if it formed a government in the 2017 election it would legalise the personal production and possession of cannabis for personal use.

In May 2019, a background cabinet paper outlining the options that had been considered for the referendum and the draft legislation was released. The referendum was announced and defended as "binding" by prime minister Jacinda Ardern and justice minister Andrew Little, but as it would not be "self-executing", the bill would still have had to pass a vote in parliament if the referendum returned a "yes" result. Legally the referendum was non-binding and the proposed bill could have been changed in any way before becoming law.

=== Cannabis laws ===
Possession of any amount of recreational cannabis is illegal in New Zealand. Cannabis use is controlled under the Misuse of Drugs Act 1975 and the maximum sentence for possession of cannabis is 3 months' imprisonment or a $500 fine; although there is a preference against imprisonment. The presumption of supply threshold is 28 grams or 100 joints; above this threshold it is presumed any cannabis possessed is for supply. Cultivation of cannabis carries a maximum penalty of 7 years' imprisonment, while dealing of cannabis carries a maximum penalty of 8 years' imprisonment. Per the tariff case R v Terewi [1999], cultivating cannabis for personal use warrants a community sentence or, if there are aggravating factors, a short-term prison sentence.

The Misuse of Drugs Amendment Act 2019 became law on 13 August 2019 and affirmed existing Police discretion of whether prosecution or a health approach is preferable for personal drug possession and use.

==== Medicinal use ====
On 1 April 2020, Misuse of Drugs (Medicinal Cannabis) Regulations 2019 came into effect. This enabled the approval of prescription medicinal psychoactive cannabis products that previously were unavailable, and also the licensing of commercial cultivation of cannabis plants for medicinal use. Approved cannabis-based pharmaceuticals can be prescribed by a specialist doctor, but require patients to meet strict criteria. Prior to the referendum, only Sativex was approved for use in New Zealand. Sativex is not subsidised, so patients must pay the full retail cost. In 2020 the Medicinal Cannabis Scheme significantly modified medicinal access to psychoactive cannabis products, and in March 2021 two new cannabidiol drugs were certified for minimum quality standards.

Terminally ill patients have had a legal defence against prosecution for possessing and consuming cannabis under the Misuse of Drugs (Medicinal Cannabis) Amendment Act since December 2018.

== Referendum structure ==
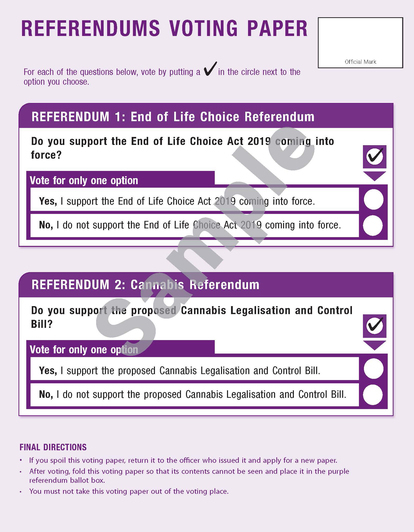
A sample ballot for the 2020 referendums

In May 2020 the final legislation was made available and it was confirmed that the question put to voters would be: Do you support the proposed Cannabis Legalisation and Control Bill?

The two options were:

- "Yes, I support the proposed Cannabis Legalisation and Control Bill" and
- "No, I do not support the proposed Cannabis Legalisation and Control Bill".

=== Proposed bill ===
If passed into law unchanged, the proposed "Cannabis Legalisation and Control Bill" would have served as new regulatory framework for the production, sale, purchase and consumption of non-medical cannabis in New Zealand. A new regulatory body, the Cannabis Regulatory Authority would have been established with the primary objectives of promoting the well-being of New Zealanders, reducing cannabis-related harm and reducing the overall use of cannabis over time.

The proposed Bill included provisions for the following:

- Minimum purchase and possession age of 20 years old
- Allowing an eligible person to purchase and possess up to 14 grams of dried cannabis (or its equivalent) per day
- Allowing each eligible person to grow up to two cannabis plants for personal use on their own property, up to a maximum of four plants per household
- A ban on marketing and advertising cannabis products
- Requirement to include harm minimisation messaging on cannabis products
- Confining use to private homes and licensed premises, and only in compliance with the Smoke-free Environments Act 1990
- Limiting the sale of recreational cannabis to physical stores (i.e. no remote or online sales)
- Control over the potency of recreational cannabis being sold
- State licensing regime for recreational cannabis
- Applying an excise tax and a harm-reduction levy to cannabis products (in addition to the 15% GST which applies to all goods sold in New Zealand)
- Establishing the Cannabis Regulatory Authority to licence and authorise supply

The full text of the bill was available, along with a guide, from the New Zealand government's referendums website.

== Public opinion ==
Many polling organisations asked New Zealanders questions related to cannabis legislation. The results were inconsistent, with "different companies producing wildly different results". However, every poll showed a clear split along age lines. Voters aged 18 to 29, Green and Labour party supporters and Māori people were more likely to support cannabis legalisation, while voters aged 50 and over and National party supporters were more likely to oppose cannabis legalisation.

Overall, support for decriminalisation reached a peak of around 65% three years before the referendum, but declined from 54% in February 2020 to around 45% in polls taken a month or so before the referendum. A 2020 study of Twitter users who tweeted about cannabis between July 2009 to August 2020 found that 62% had a positive view of cannabis, with tweets in 2020 having a slightly higher proportion of positive views on cannabis (65.3%), while 53.5% of those who talked about the cannabis referendum were in support of the bill.

Most polling conducted prior to September 2020 asked about opinions on the legalisation of cannabis for personal use, or in some cases, about government control of use and sale of cannabis, rather than about the Legalisation and Control Bill, which was released for public consultation in May 2020. Polls asking about the specific bill showed mixed opinion, from 35% for / 53% against to 49% for / 45% against.

Opinion poll numbers tend to trend higher around support for medicinal use of cannabis. When voting age New Zealanders were asked in July 2017 if they supported "growing and/or using cannabis for medical reasons if you have a terminal illness", 59% responded that it should be legal, 22% supported decriminalisation, while 15% responded it should be illegal. However, when they were asked their thoughts on "Possessing a small amount of cannabis for personal use", 37% responded that it should be decriminalised, 31% responded that it should be illegal, and 28% responded that it should be fully legal.

=== Polling ===
Summary of poll results given below. Lines give the mean estimated by a LOESS smoother (smoothing set to span = 1).

Date	Polling organisation	Sample size	For	Against	Undecided	Lead
10–14 Oct 2020	1 News Colmar Brunton	1,005	41	51	8	10
2–4 Oct 2020	Research New Zealand	1,002	46	40	14	6
22 Sep – 5 Oct 2020	UMR Research	1,129	49	45	6	4
24–28 Sep 2020	Horizon Research	1,481	52	47	–	5
17–21 Sep 2020	1 News Colmar Brunton	1,008	35	53	11	18
20–25 Aug 2020	Horizon Research	1,300	49.5	49.5	1	Tie
20–23 Aug 2020	Research New Zealand	1,003	39	46	15	7
9–13 Jul 2020	Research New Zealand	1,012	43	39	18	4
20–24 Jun 2020	1 News Colmar Brunton	1,007	40	49	11	9
10–14 Jun 2020	Horizon Research	1,593	56	43	–	13
6–9 Mar 2020	Research New Zealand	1,000	43	33	19	10
21–26 Feb 2020	Horizon Research	1,986	54	45	1	9
8–12 Feb 2020	1 News Colmar Brunton	1,004	39	51	9	12
23–27 Nov 2019	1 News Colmar Brunton	1,006	43	49	7	6
11–17 Nov 2019	Horizon Research	1,199	48	38	14	10
3–4 Aug 2019	Horizon Research	1,003	39	47	14	8
4–8 Jun 2019	1 News Colmar Brunton	1,002	39	52	8	13
9 May 2019	Horizon Research	1,161	52	37	11	15
3–17 Mar 2019	Research New Zealand	1,220	29	49	18	20
10–26 Oct 2018	Horizon Research	995	60	24	16	36
15–19 Oct 2018	1 News Colmar Brunton	1,006	46	41	12	5
2–17 Jul 2018	Curia Market Research	943	49	47	3	2

== Debate ==
Leading up to the referendum, much media attention was paid to the upcoming vote, and to arguments for and against the legalisation of cannabis in New Zealand. Proponents of the bill focused largely on the inefficacy of prohibition, and the prevalence of black market cannabis in New Zealand, while opponents argued that the legislation would allow greater access to the drug, especially for children.

=== Arguments for reform ===
==== Prohibition being ineffective ====
The New Zealand Drug Foundation (NZDF), a pro-reform charitable trust, said that 80% of New Zealanders have tried cannabis by age 21, but only 10% of the population become heavy users. The NZDF reported that New Zealanders consume around 74 tonnes of cannabis a year, and that each year, the New Zealand Police spend over 330,000 hours on cannabis enforcement which costs the taxpayer almost $200 million. NZDF suggested that legalisation would free up police to focus on more serious drug crimes.

==== Disproportionate impact on Māori ====
The NZDF also argued that there is a significant underground market for cannabis and that prohibition disproportionately criminalises Māori. According to the NZDF, Māori are three times more likely to get a cannabis conviction than non-Māori for the same level of cannabis use, are twice as likely as non-Māori to suffer a substance use disorder and find it harder to access health and treatment services. The NZDF suggested that Cannabis Legalisation and Control Bill would largely eliminate the black market for cannabis and reduce the number of young Māori receiving convictions by enabling Māori participation in a regulated legal market, and providing for Māori representation on the body charged with developing national cannabis policy.

It was independently reported that 79% of Māori supported the Bill.

==== Employment & tax intake ====
Studies conducted by independent consultancy Business and Economic Research Limited indicate the annual tax intake from cannabis, if it was legalised, would be more than $1 billion. The NZDF suggested that this money could be put into healthcare (including more addiction treatment facilities), schools, education programmes and other infrastructure that will benefit all New Zealanders. The cannabis industry could employ about 5000 people and allow the government to regulate and tax the sale and distribution.

=== Arguments against reform ===
==== Use by children ====
Opponents of the bill suggested that despite an age limit on legal cannabis trade, children would be influenced by new legal and social norms, and, similar to alcohol and cigarettes, a greater prevalence of the drug would lead to cannabis use at younger ages than the legislation regulates for. In Oregon, where cannabis has been legalised, the number of children younger than six reported poisoned by cannabis rose by 271 per cent (from 14 cases to 52). Concerns were also expressed that government and authorities were not able to control underage access and use of alcohol and vaping products, so were unlikely to be able to control illegal cannabis use.

The age at which people start using cannabis is an important factor, and use of the drug can affect brain development in teenagers. A New Zealand study found that heavy use by teens led to an average loss of eight IQ points between ages 13 and 38. Even if these individuals quit as adults, lost mental abilities didn't fully return. Those who started smoking cannabis as adults didn't show notable IQ declines. Frequent use in early teens also doubles the risk of developing schizophrenia in the future.

==== Increase in use ====
The Smart Approaches to Marijuana NZ Coalition, and the Say Nope to Dope campaign, suggest that the introduction of a legal market would lead to competition with the existing black market and drive cannabis prices down. The group suggested that this would lead to an increase in cannabis use overall, an outcome that is counter to the purpose of the bill: reducing harm.

==== Road and workplace accidents ====
Concerns were also raised that if more people start smoking it, this might lead to more road accidents and workplace injuries. Research in New Zealand showed that regular cannabis users have ten times the risk of car crash injuries or death compared to non-users, with another study showing that more than half of drivers causing a crash had drugs in their system.

==== Impact on health ====
Opponents to the bill emphasised that cannabis smoke irritates the lungs, and people who smoke it frequently can have the similar breathing problems to those who smoke tobacco. These problems include daily cough and phlegm, more frequent lung illness, and a higher risk of lung infections. A succession of clinical studies have found it increases the risk of chronic bronchitis, inflammation of the throat, and impaired immune function. However, it has not been shown to cause lung cancer. Cannabis may also precipitate schizophrenia in individuals who are vulnerable because of a personal or family history of schizophrenia.

== Campaigning and endorsements ==
The rules regarding campaigning for the referendum were generally the same as for the general election. All advertisements had to carry a promoter statement, stating the name and physical address of the promoter. It was illegal to campaign on polling day, or within a 10-metre (33 ft) radius of an advance polling booth.

During the regulated period, which ran from 18 August to 16 October 2020, promoters had to declare their campaign expenses and there were limits on how much they could spend on referendum campaigning. The maximum expense limit was $338,000 per referendum for those promoters registered with the Electoral Commission, and $13,600 per referendum for unregistered promoters.

There were 15 registered promoters for the 2020 General Election and Referendums, two of which were against recreational cannabis: Family First New Zealand and SAM (Smart Approaches to Marijuana) NZ Coalition and 13 were in support. The Helen Clark Foundation was not registered, but was influential in the lead up to the election.

On 30 June 2020, Minister of Justice Andrew Little claimed SAM NZ's campaign was funded by US political organisation Smart Approaches to Marijuana (SAM), via Family First, however SAM NZ state they are fully funded by concerned New Zealand families and did not receive any funding from the US organisation.

The New Zealand Medical Association initially announced its opposition to the legislation, although controversy around a lack of membership consultation led the board to retract their public stance. The NZMA originally stated that "cannabis is a harmful drug that causes a range of health and social harms at the individual and community level", however it was subsequently revealed that the NZMA relied on outdated information and had not consulted any of its 5,000 doctors before making their statement public. Many GPs were upset by this and, subsequently, more than 100 doctors publicly supported cannabis legalisation. Dr Emma Clare said many doctors thought the referendum would pass, and so did not speak up about the NZMA's anti legislation stance. The NZMA was also criticised by former prime minister Helen Clark, who said it had given "a false impression to voters of what doctors think". Less than two weeks before election day, when early voting had been going on for over a week, the NZMA sent a letter of apology to its members which said: "The NZMA will have no position regarding the cannabis referendum."

While the government claimed to not have a position on the legalisation of cannabis, opponents of the proposed bill criticised government-published information for bias and lobbying for law change. The New Zealand Medical Journal was critical of the government naming and promoting the proposed bill as planning to "reduce harm", because evidence on outcomes were inconclusive, as legalisation was a still new model. The government was also criticised for not releasing an assessment report of the potential effects of legalisation, until after voting had begun.

The government-funded NZ Drug Foundation claimed to be apolitical, but was accused of misleading advertising, saying the proposed bill would improve access to medicinal cannabis, when the proposed bill did not include medicinal cannabis.

Close to the election, The Spinoff said Family First's "Say Nope To Dope" and SAM-NZ's "Vote Nope To Dope" campaigns had "out-worked and out-messaged pro-legalisation campaigners", observing "one team just wanting it more".

Much media attention was given to the fact that prime minister Jacinda Ardern would neither endorse, nor reveal her personal stance on the referendum. In May 2020 Jacinda Ardern polled as New Zealand's most popular prime minister in a century, thanks in part to her success in dealing with the COVID-19 pandemic. Speculation prior to the election held that an endorsement from Ardern, would likely sway the outcome of the referendum, but despite publicly endorsing a Yes vote for the euthanasia referendum, she did not share her position on the cannabis referendum. Ardern stated that she wanted New Zealanders to form their own views on the matter, and that the Labour Party also held no official position.

Professor Papaarangi Reid, head of the department of Māori health at the University of Auckland, suggested the legislation would have helped regulate its strength, its cost and limit its accessibility by young people.

=== Supported Yes vote ===
==== Individuals ====
- Israel Adesanya
- Helen Clark, former Prime Minister of New Zealand (1999–2008)
- Dr Hinemoa Elder, New Zealand youth forensic psychiatrist
- Abe Gray, founder of the Whakamana Cannabis Museum and high-profile cannabis activist and protester.
- Andrew Little, Labour Party MP and former Minister of Justice
- Shai Navot, then deputy leader of The Opportunities Party (TOP)
- Diane Robertson
- Chlöe Swarbrick, Green Party MP
- Tiki Taane
- Topp Twins
- Sam Neill
- Paul Wieland, consultant anaesthetist at Southland hospital.

==== Organisations ====
- The Helen Clark Foundation. In September 2019, the Foundation issued a report analysing the impact of the current law and supporting legalisation.
- New Zealand Drug Foundation
- NORML New Zealand
- JustSpeak, a youth-focused group which advocates for criminal justice reform
- ActionStation Aotearoa
- Victoria University of Wellington Students Association. VUWSA endorsed a Yes vote after 75 per cent of students voted in favour at the annual association referendum.

==== Political parties ====
- Aotearoa Legalise Cannabis Party
- Green Party
- The Opportunities Party (TOP)

=== Supported No vote ===
==== Individuals ====
- Paula Bennett, former Deputy Prime Minister of New Zealand (2016–17)
- Simeon Brown, National Party MP
- Eroni Clarke
- Efeso Collins
- Judith Collins, then National Party Leader and Leader of the Opposition (2020–2021)
- Patrick Drumm, Mount Albert Grammar School Principal
- James Farmer, Queen's Counsel
- Kate Hawkesby
- Mike Hosking
- Aaron Ironside, SAM NZ Spokesperson, counsellor, pastor and broadcaster.
- John Key, former Prime Minister of New Zealand (2008–2016)
- Jo Luxton, Labour Party candidate for Rangitata
- Muriel Newman, former ACT New Zealand politician
- Wynton Rufer
- Nick Smith, National Party MP
- David Tua

==== Organisations ====
- Family First New Zealand
- The Salvation Army agreed with the need for decriminalisation but did not support the legalisation of cannabis as proposed in the referendum.
- SAM (Smart Approaches to Marijuana) NZ Coalition, a collective of more than 25 groups and individuals, including drug addiction and testing services, the Sensible Sentencing Trust, family organisations, and faith-based organisations like the NZ Christian Network, the New Zealand Muslim Association, and Foundation for a Drug-Free World, a division of the Church of Scientology.

==== Political parties ====
- New Zealand National Party caucus
- New Conservative Party

== Results ==
Results of the 2020 cannabis referendum

Official results for the general election and referendums were released on 6 November 2020. The number opposed to legalisation was 50.7% with 48.4% in favour. Preliminary results for the referendums were released by the Electoral Commission on 30 October 2020. Those results had 53.5% of people opposed to the legislation with 46.5% in support. Around 480,000 special votes were counted later reducing the percentage opposed to 50.7%.

Unlike the general election, a preliminary count for the cannabis and euthanasia referendums was not completed on election night (17 October). All voting papers, counterfoils and electoral rolls were returned to the electorate's returning officer for counting. During the count, the returning officer approved and counted any special votes, and compiled a master electoral roll to ensure no-one voted more than once. Special votes include votes from those who enrolled after the deadline of 13 September, those who voted outside their electorate (including overseas votes), voters in hospital or prison, and those voters enrolled on the unpublished roll. To simplify processing and counting, overseas votes were sent to and counted at the Electoral Commission's central processing centre in Wellington.

Official results of the New Zealand cannabis referendum, 17 October 2020
Option	Votes	
Option	Num.	%
Yes	1,406,973	48.83
No	1,474,635	51.17
Valid votes cast	2,881,608	99.09
Informal votes	26,463	0.91
Total votes cast	2,908,071	100.00
Registered voters and turnout	3,549,564	82.24

Cannabis referendum results (excluding invalid votes)
Yes; 1,406,973 (48.8%)	No; 1,474,635 (51.2%)
▲50%

=== By polling place location ===
As each polling place had only one ballot box for ordinary referendum votes, ordinary votes were broken down by the general electorate where the polling place was located. Special votes were broken down by electorate. Both ordinary and special votes have been combined in the following table.

Electorate	Yes		No		Informal	Turnout
Electorate	Num.	%	Num	%	Informal	Turnout
Auckland Central	25,643	67.98	12,081	32.02	272	
Banks Peninsula	24,069	52.57	21,978	47.73	339	
Bay of Plenty	21,410	46.51	24,625	53.49	295	
Botany	13,053	33.21	26,249	66.79	430	
Christchurch Central	24,911	54.49	20,805	45.51	415	
Christchurch East	26,157	54.78	21,595	45.22	408	
Coromandel	21,712	45.35	26,169	54.65	319	
Dunedin	32,027	63.49	18,414	36.51	318	
East Coast	27,665	52.29	25,238	47.71	424	
East Coast Bays	18,105	41.09	25,958	58.91	290	
Epsom	21,691	48.79	22,766	51.21	433	
Hamilton East	21,975	47.11	24,670	52.89	424	
Hamilton West	22,970	49.67	23,271	50.33	455	
Hutt South	26,365	52.34	24,009	47.66	579	
Ilam	19,522	45.87	23,040	54.13	374	
Invercargill	19,058	45.67	22,674	54.33	284	
Kaikoura	17,939	41.94	24,831	58.06	282	
Kaipara ki Mahurangi	24,040	48.03	26,015	51.97	379	
Kelston	16,840	51.65	15,767	48.35	465	
Mana	21,316	53.56	18,484	46.14	417	
Māngere	12,491	40.55	18,316	59.45	622	
Manurewa	16,612	41.45	19,920	58.55	822	
Maungakiekie	18,466	48.11	19,920	51.89	475	
Mount Albert	27,274	63.21	15,871	36.79	373	
Mount Roskill	16,167	42.12	22,214	57.88	714	
Napier	22,103	48.04	23,902	51.96	365	
Nelson	24,744	50.41	24,345	49.59	473	
New Lynn	20,874	51.05	20,017	48.95	568	
New Plymouth	23,178	48.79	24,328	51.21	316	
North Shore	19,199	45.21	23,270	54.79	275	
Northcote	20,760	50.39	20,436	49.61	402	
Northland	27,660	53.61	23,937	46.39	400	
Ōhāriu	21,542	53.03	19,077	46.97	345	
Ōtaki	24,865	48.16	26,761	51.84	446	
Pakuranga	14,461	36.14	25,550	63.86	405	
Palmerston North	19,907	48.25	21,351	51.75	358	
Panmure-Ōtāhuhu	13,633	43.34	17,821	56.66	776	
Papakura	17,816	42.74	23,869	57.26	414	
Port Waikato	18,337	42.93	24,337	57.07	361	
Rangitata	18,514	40.68	26,994	59.32	374	
Rangitīkei	20,350	45.56	24,312	54.44	282	
Remutaka	20,654	49.78	20,835	50.22	411	
Rongotai	28,398	66.98	13,998	33.02	566	
Rotorua	22,357	49.21	23,078	50.79	385	
Selwyn	16,266	40.80	23,061	59.20	201	
Southland	18,771	46.60	21,506	53.40	240	
Taieri	20,572	47.31	22,913	52.69	315	
Takanini	11,924	39.11	18,565	60.89	544	
Tāmaki	18,572	43.63	23,992	56.37	357	
Taranaki-King Country	17,660	43.95	22,525	56.05	244	
Taupō	21,844	43.86	27,960	56.14	333	
Tauranga	22,171	43.15	29,214	56.85	420	
Te Atatū	20,118	46.35	23,291	53.65	538	
Tukituki	20,847	46.49	23,991	53.51	379	
Upper Harbour	16,048	43.96	20,461	56.04	333	
Waikato	16,043	42.53	21,676	57.47	287	
Waimakariri	18,772	41.30	26,679	58.70	304	
Wairarapa	22,309	46.36	25,817	53.64	324	
Waitaki	19,162	45.05	23,372	54.95	295	
Wellington Central	44,712	73.35	16,247	26.65	368	
West Coast-Tasman	20,793	51.10	19,901	48.90	308	
Whanganui	21,460	47.67	23,556	52.33	344	
Whangaparāoa	18,207	41.99	25,156	58.01	227	
Whangārei	26,385	51.20	25,150	48.80	430	
Wigram	21,110	47.62	23,222	52.38	515	
Hauraki-Waikato	5,367	78.66	1,456	21.34	100	
Ikaroa-Rāwhiti	4,613	80.58	1,112	19.42	86	
Tāmaki Makaurau	5,572	79.81	1,410	20.19	104	
Te Tai Hauāuru	5,127	81.08	1,196	18.92	81	
Te Tai Tokerau	5,402	79.59	1,385	20.41	81	
Te Tai Tonga	5,189	82.88	1,072	17.12	71	
Waiariki	5,127	77.11	1,522	22.89	104	
Total	1,406,973	48.83	1,474,635	51.17	26,463	

== Response ==
Green Party MP Chlöe Swarbrick, a campaigner for drug reform, sarcastically told the winning No campaigners "Well done. It [cannabis] still exists" and said she would continue her fight for legalising cannabis. She labelled as hypocrites the majority of parliamentarians, who refused to publicly state they supported legalisation.

After preliminary results for the referendum were released, Prime Minister Jacinda Ardern revealed that she had voted Yes in the referendum, and subsequently faced criticism, with Swarbrick suggesting that Ardern's refusal to offer public support showed she was not willing to stand up for her convictions. Aaron Ironside, spokesperson for SAM-NZ (who endorsed a "No" vote), agreed that Ardern's silence contributed to the result and said she had done the right thing letting voters decide, as that was the point of the referendum.

National MP Nick Smith described the preliminary result as a "victory for common sense" and that New Zealanders had "signalled opposition to the softening of drug crime". Family First director Bob McCoskrie of the "Say Nope to Dope" campaign said that he was "pretty stoked" with the preliminary referendum results and that New Zealanders "understood the perceived benefits of legalisation were not greater than the harms that were going to come on society". Ironside said that he was happy that New Zealand younger people would not be enlisted in a "social experiment."

Writing on Stuff, columnist Damien Grant pointed out that previous governments had ignored referendum results and thought the new Labour government should do the same. He said: "Not only is the idea that the electorate should decide any particular issue impracticable, the closeness of the cannabis vote means that the prohibition of the drug is now unworkable" and argued that parliament should, "consider the ethical merits of subjecting the minority of otherwise law-abiding citizens to criminal sanctions for smoking dried leaves at the behest of a puritan majority".

Parmjit Randhawa, director of Christchurch-based medicinal cannabis company Greenlab was glad the referendum didn't pass as he didn't think there was enough clinical evidence supporting recreational cannabis. Speaking of research and development into medicinal cannabis he said "Before we start running, we should start walking."

Victoria University associate professor Fiona Hutton said she thought the No campaign advertisements were "based on outdated moralised notions of those who use drugs, influenced by rightwing religious groups from the US". Hutton also thought "the playing field was never level, [and] that absolutely fantastic academics, community groups, organisations and campaigners [...] sought to educate, to inform, to circulate evidence, to give people clear and balanced information, fought to get their voices heard amongst swirling misinformation and misdirection".

NewstalkZB radio broadcaster Mike Hosking spoke about research showing the media bias in favour of the Yes campaigners, saying "36 percent of all headlines promoted yes, 18 percent were for no. In other words, twice as much of what you saw was for one camp." Similarly figures on the number of reported quotes from advocates showed "the yes position was quoted twice as often as no". He said "worst offenders were The Spinoff, Stuff, Newshub, the Herald, TVNZ, and Radio New Zealand" and that he thought TVNZ & RNZ had "a statutory obligation to be fair and balanced".
