= Electoral history of David Shearer =

Electoral history article

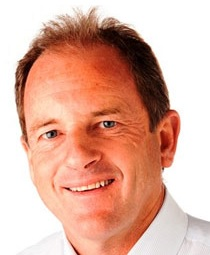
David Shearer in 2011.

This is a summary of the electoral history of David Shearer, Leader of the New Zealand Labour Party (2011–13) and Member of Parliament for Mount Albert (2009–2016).

== Parliamentary elections ==
=== 2002 election ===
General election, 2002: Whangarei
Notes:	Blue background denotes the winner of the electorate vote. Pink background denotes a candidate elected from their party list. Yellow background denotes an electorate win by a list member, or other incumbent. A ✓ or ✗ denotes status of any incumbent, win or lose respectively.						
Party	Candidate	Votes	%	±%	Party votes	%	±%
National	✓ Phil Heatley	13,829	43.03		7,493	23.17	
Labour	David Shearer	10,615	33.03		11,374	35.17	
NZ First	Brian Donnelly	3,774	11.74		5,008	15.48	
ACT	Muriel Newman	1,297	4.03		2,623	8.11	
Green	Calvin Green	1,180	3.60		2,111	6.52	
Christian Heritage	Rod Harris	521	1.62		807	2.49	
United Future	Gary Phillips	268	0.83		1,483	4.58	
Alliance	Ticia Cutforth	239	0.74		351	1.08	
Progressive	David Wilson	156	0.48		394	1.21	
Libertarianz	Helen Hughes	97	0.30				
ORNZ					383	1.18	
Legalise Cannabis					143	0.44	
One NZ					23	0.07	
Mana Māori					11	0.03	
NMP					3	0.009	
Informal votes		159			125		
Total valid votes		32,135			32,332		
National hold	Majority	3,214	10.00				

=== 2009 by-election ===
2009 Mount Albert by-election
Notes: Blue background denotes the winner of the by-election. Pink background denotes a candidate elected from their party list prior to the by-election. Yellow background denotes the winner of the by-election, who was a list MP prior to the by-election. A ✓ or ✗ denotes status of any incumbent, win or lose respectively.
Party	Candidate	Votes	%	±%
Labour	David Shearer	13,260	63.49	+4.20
National	Melissa Lee^{a}	3,542	16.96	-11.88
Green	Russel Norman^{a}	2,567	12.29	+6.35
ACT	John Boscawen^{a}	968	4.63	+0.54
Bill and Ben	Ben Boyce	158	0.76	
Legalise Cannabis	Dakta Green	92	0.44	
Kiwi	Simonne Dyer	91	0.44	
United Future	Judy Turner	89	0.43	
Libertarianz	Julian Pistorius	39	0.19	
Independent	Jim Bagnell	24	0.11	
Independent	Ari Baker	15	0.07	
Human Rights Party	Anthony Van den Heuvel	13	0.06	
People Before Profit	Malcom France	13	0.06	
Independent	Jackson James Wood	9	0.04	
People's Choice	Rusty Kane	5	0.02	
Informal votes		58		
Total Valid votes		20,885		
Labour hold	Majority	9,718	46.40	+4.02

^{a} Three candidates were list MPs elected at the 2008 election.

=== 2011 election ===
General election, 2011: Mount Albert
Notes:	Blue background denotes the winner of the electorate vote. Pink background denotes a candidate elected from their party list. Yellow background denotes an electorate win by a list member, or other incumbent. A ✓ or ✗ denotes status of any incumbent, win or lose respectively.						
Party	Candidate	Votes	%	±%	Party votes	%	±%
Labour	✓ David Shearer	18,716	59.19	-0.10	12,238	37.09	-5.51
National	Melissa Lee	8,695	27.50	-1.35	12,102	36.67	+1.01
Green	David Clendon	3,000	9.49	+3.55	5,660	17.15	+6.15
Conservative Party of New Zealand	Frank Poching	786	2.49	+2.49	532	1.61	+1.61
ACT	Stephen Boyle	425	1.34	-2.75	306	0.93	-2.58
NZ First					1,494	4.53	+1.85
Mana					191	0.58	-+0.58
Māori Party					172	0.52	-0.26
Legalise Cannabis					135	0.41	+0.12
United Future New Zealand					114	0.35	-0.32
Libertarianz					29	0.09	+0.04
Alliance					21	0.06	+0.01
Democrats					5	0.02	-0.005
Informal votes		969			272		
Total valid votes		31,622			32,999		
Labour hold	Majority	10,021	31.69	+1.24			

=== 2014 election ===
General election, 2014: Mount Albert
Notes:	Blue background denotes the winner of the electorate vote. Pink background denotes a candidate elected from their party list. Yellow background denotes an electorate win by a list member, or other incumbent. A ✓ or ✗ denotes status of any incumbent, win or lose respectively.						
Party	Candidate	Votes	%	±%	Party votes	%	±%
Labour	✓ David Shearer	20,970	58.17	−1.02	10,823	29.31	−7.78
National	Melissa Lee	10,314	28.61	+1.11	14,359	38.89	+2.22
Green	Jeanette Elley	3,152	8.74	−0.75	8,005	21.68	+4.53
Conservative Party of New Zealand	Jeffrey Johnson	525	1.46	−1.03	719	1.95	+0.34
ACT	Tommy Fergusson	321	0.89	−0.45	356	0.96	+0.03
Mana	Joe Carolan	290	0.80	+0.80			
Human Rights	Anthony van den Heuvel	76	0.21	+0.21			
Independent	Michael Wackrow	68	0.19	+0.19			
NZ First					1,512	4.10	−0.43
Internet Mana					603	1.63	+1.05
Māori Party					178	0.48	−0.04
Legalise Cannabis					93	0.25	−0.16
United Future					57	0.15	−0.20
Ban 1080					12	0.03	+0.03
Civilian					11	0.03	+0.03
Democrats					7	0.02	±0.00
Focus					6	0.02	+0.02
Independent Coalition					5	0.01	+0.01
Informal votes		336			176		
Total valid votes		36,052			36,922		
Turnout		36,922	79.41	+6.42			
Labour hold	Majority	10,656	29.56	−2.13			
