= Cannabis in New Zealand =

- Location of New Zealand (dark green)
- Medicinal: Legal
- Recreational: Illegal
- Hemp: Legal

The use of cannabis in New Zealand is regulated by the Misuse of Drugs Act 1975, which makes unauthorised possession of any amount of cannabis a crime. Cannabis is the fourth-most widely used recreational drug in New Zealand, after caffeine, alcohol and tobacco, and the most widely used illicit drug. In 2001 a household survey revealed that 13.4% of New Zealanders aged 15–64 used cannabis. This ranked as the ninth-highest cannabis consumption level in the world.

From 18 December 2018, the Misuse of Drugs Act was amended, allowing for much broader use of medical marijuana, making the drug available to terminally ill patients in the last 12 months of life. As of the end of 2022, dried cannabis flower is available on prescription to anyone who might benefit from it who is suffering from issues around pain, sleep or anxiety.

In December 2018, the Labour-led government announced a referendum on the legality of cannabis for personal use, to be held as part of the 2020 general election. This was a condition of the Green Party giving confidence and supply to the Government. In 2020 the referendum was held, asking voters whether they support a new bill which would regulate sale, production and possession of cannabis in New Zealand, in which the 'no' vote won, receiving 50.7% of the vote.

== History ==
Among Britain's colonies, New Zealand was one of the few areas where the United Kingdom did not encourage extensive industrial hemp production, as the native harakeke plant could instead be used for fibre. In 1927, New Zealand passed the Dangerous Drugs Act, whose schedule listed, among other controlled drugs:

Indian hemp—that is, the dried flowering or fruiting tops of the pistillate plant known as Cannabis sativa L. from which the resin has not been extracted, and

including—

(a) Resin obtained from Indian hemp;
(b) Preparations of which the resin from Indian hemp forms the base; and
(c) Extracts and tinctures of Indian hemp.

Cannabis continued to be used as a prescription medication. In accordance with its international obligations under the 1961 Single Convention on Narcotic Drugs, New Zealand passed the Narcotics Act in 1965, which banned a number of drugs, including cannabis.

Recreational cannabis use was rare in New Zealand for most of the 20th century, with one scholar noting 1967 as a watershed point where demand for cannabis boomed among "musicians and university students".

The cultivation and distribution of industrial hemp was legalised in 2006 under the Misuse of Drugs (Industrial Hemp) Regulations.

In 2013, Abe Gray founded Whakamana Cannabis Museum, New Zealand's first and only cannabis museum, in Dunedin. The museum has since shifted locations to Dunedin’s main street, Princes Street, then moved to Shand's Emporium in Christchurch, and now seeking a fourth iteration in Wellington.

== Usage ==
Cannabis is the most widely used illegal drug in New Zealand and the fourth-most widely used recreational drug after caffeine, alcohol and tobacco. The usage by those aged between 16–64 is 13.4%, the ninth-highest level of consumption in the world, and 15.1% of those who smoked cannabis used it ten times or more per month. According to a UN study usage by 15- to 45-year-olds in 2003 was about 20% and this dropped to 17.9% in 2010.

A 25-year longitudinal study of "1000 Christchurch born young people between the ages of 15–25" called the "Christchurch Health and Development Study" found that over two thirds of the cohort had used cannabis at least once by the age of 21 with 5% of the cohort having used cannabis more than 400 times. The study concluded that "regular or heavy cannabis use was associated with an increased risk of using other illicit drugs, abusing or becoming dependent upon other illicit drugs, and using a wider variety of other illicit drugs". The lead author of the study, David Fergusson, stated:

Our research shows the regular use of cannabis increases the risks that young people will try other illicit drugs. What's not clear are the underlying processes that lead to this association. Understanding these processes is critical to how we view cannabis.

If the association arises because using cannabis increases contact with illegal drug markets, this is a ground for the decriminalisation or legalisation of cannabis. If, however, the association arises because using cannabis encourages young people to experiment with other illicit drugs the results could be seen as supporting the prohibition of cannabis use.

In The New Zealand Drug Trends Survey (NZDTS) conducted from February to July 2024, with a sample size of 10,781 respondents, 70% of respondents said they had used cannabis at least once in the last six months, more than any other listed illegal drug. Cannabis ranked second in terms of all drugs listed (legal or illegal) in terms of those that said they had used it once or more in the last six months, with the only drug that a higher proportion of people indicated that had used at least once in the last six months being alcohol at 86%.

== Legality ==
Cannabis use is controlled by the Misuse of Drugs Act 1975. Possession of any amount of cannabis is illegal. The maximum penalty for possession of cannabis is imprisonment for a term not exceeding three months or a $500 fine, although Section 7(2) of the Misuse of Drugs Act 1975 contains a rebuttable presumption against imprisonment in respect of possession offences in respect of class C controlled drugs, which include cannabis. Cultivation of cannabis carries a maximum penalty of seven years' imprisonment. Selling cannabis, offering to sell or supplying cannabis to a person under the age of 18 years carries a maximum penalty of eight years' imprisonment. Cannabis oil and hashish are defined as class B drugs, and those convicted of manufacturing or supplying face a maximum penalty of 14 years' imprisonment. Possession of a class-B controlled drug carries a maximum sentence of up to three months' imprisonment or a fine not exceeding $500.

The current tariff case for cultivation and dealing in cannabis, is R v Terewi [1999]. There are three bands of offence: band 1 for personal or non-commercial operations, band 2 for small-scale operations, and band 3 for large-scale operations. Band 1 has a starting point of a community sentence or a short-term prison sentence; band 2 has a starting point of between 2 and 4 years imprisonment, and band 3 has a starting point of 4 or more years imprisonment.

Anyone caught in possession of at least 28 grams (1 ounce) of cannabis or 100 cannabis joints is presumed to be a supplier, unless the defendant can prove they are not. In R v Hansen [2007], a majority of the Supreme Court held that this presumption was inconsistent with section 25(c) of the Bill of Rights Act because it violates the right to be considered innocent until proven guilty. They also held that it was not a justified limitation under section 5 of that Act, but the presumption remains effective regardless of this inconsistency. Cannabis is a class C drug, of which the penalty for dealing can result in a maximum prison sentence of eight years under the Act. There have been many public campaigns to decriminalise cannabis but so far none have succeeded. It is generally accepted that the usage rate is high and possession in small quantities may not often be prosecuted. In some cases first offences may result in a formal warning and confiscation by police.

=== Reform ===
The Aotearoa Legalise Cannabis Party has stood candidates since the 1996 general election. They won 1.66% of the party vote in that election, the largest proportion in its history. The party has never won an electorate seat, or received the minimum of 5% of the party vote to have members from the party list in parliament.

In 2006, Green Party MP Metiria Turei's Misuse of Drugs (Medicinal Cannabis) Amendment Bill was drawn from the member's ballot. The purpose of the bill was to amend the Misuse of Drugs Act so that cannabis could be used for medicinal purposes, and to permit the cultivation and possession of a small amount of cannabis by registered medical users or a designated agent. The bill received a conscience vote at its first reading in July 2009, and was defeated 84–34. All MPs in the ruling National Party voted against the bill, as did the sole members from United Future and Jim Anderton's Progressive Party; while all members from the Green Party and ACT voted in favour of the bill (other than ACT MP Roger Douglas, who did not vote). The vote was split from MPs in the opposition Labour Party and the Māori Party.

In March 2016, New Zealand's Associate Health Minister Peter Dunne has said that he would support policy change regarding medical marijuana if it is proven to be effective in treating illnesses. This, along with the seasonal shortage of cannabis that has been intensified by multiple police raids on cannabis crops, has put New Zealand's cannabis policies in the political spotlight locally. There have been talks of policy change among government officials, and multiple MPs do support policy change, but as of yet there have been no actual plans made to change New Zealand's laws around cannabis. NORML New Zealand is currently the predominant organisation pushing for a change, but support from a large proportion of the public exists. A poll carried out by the research company UMR surveyed 1750 New Zealanders, and the results concluded that 71% of the people surveyed supported the idea of a medicinal marijuana regime in New Zealand.

In December 2016, the Green Party said that if it formed a government in the 2017 election it will legalise cannabis. 'Under its proposal, people would be able to legally grow and possess marijuana for personal use'. The party would also 'urgently amend the law so sick people using medicinal marijuana were not penalised'. In the formation of the Sixth Labour Government in 2017, the Greens leveraged a cannabis referendum, to be held before or alongside the 2020 general election.

In December 2019, Misuse of Drugs (Medicinal Cannabis) Regulations 2019 were made having a commencement date of 1 April 2020. This enabled the approval of prescription medicinal psychoactive cannabis products that previously were unavailable, and also the licensing of commercial cultivation of cannabis plants for medicinal use. As of 23 July 2020, there are no products available under the scheme, but they were expected to become available in the next few months.

==== Terminally ill defence ====
Since the passing of the Misuse of Drugs (Medicinal Cannabis) Amendment Act 2018, there is now a statutory defence for those requiring palliative care to possess and use illicit cannabis, and to possess a cannabis utensil.

==== 2020 New Zealand cannabis referendum ====
On 18 December 2018, the Government announced a nationwide referendum on the legality of recreational cannabis for personal use, set to be held as part of the 2020 general election. Contrary to the pre-election commitment of the Government, the results of this referendum were not binding and the passage of the legislation would require a vote in parliament.

The results of the referendum were that 50.7% of voters were against legalisation and 48.4% were in support.

Official results of the New Zealand cannabis referendum, 6 November 2020
Option	Votes	
Option	Num.	%
Yes	1,406,973	48.4
No	1,474,635	50.7
Total	2,881,608	99.1
Informal votes	26,463	0.9
Total votes cast	2,908,071	100.0
Registered voters and turnout	3,549,564	82.24

== Enforcement ==
Data from the "Christchurch Health and Development Study" shows that by the age of 21, 5.1% of cannabis users from the cohort had been arrested for a cannabis related offence while 3.6% had been convicted. Of those convicted, just under 10% received a custodial sentence with the remainder principally receiving fines. All cohort members with custodial sentences had been convicted of other crimes in addition to a cannabis related offence.

=== Adult Diversion Scheme ===
First offenders charged with minor crimes and accepting full responsibility of their actions are considered for the New Zealand Police Adult Diversion Scheme. Given offenders agree to the conditions of diversion (which usually involves a written agreement tailored to change the offending behaviour), the offender may have the charge withdrawn.

=== Notable cases ===
At least four people have died while policing cannabis in New Zealand. Detective Travis Hughes and Christopher Scott were killed when their Cessna 172 crashed in Central Otago while on cannabis reconnaissance. Detective Tony Harrod died falling from a helicopter sling recovering plants in Taranaki.

During the 2009 Napier shootings, Jan Molenaar fired on three police officers executing a cannabis search warrant, killing Senior Constable Len Snee. People who knew Molenaar described a long-standing, tense relationship between him and the police surrounding the legality of his cannabis involvement, saying, 'Molenaar believed his home was being watched and told friends he was determined to "go out in blaze of glory" if police came to arrest him', and, 'police knew who Molenaar was and knew what he would do in a situation'.

A notable case involving cannabis growing equipment was the prosecution of the owner, general manager, and several staff members of the Switched on Gardener stores following a series of arrests and raids in 2010.

Total Police apprehensions for cannabis offences, 2010–14
Offence category	Year ending 31 December				
Offence category	2010	2011	2012	2013	2014
Import or export cannabis	16	17	13	40	11
Deal or traffic cannabis	2,031	2,094	3,015	1,499	1,602
Manufacture or cultivate cannabis	2,425	2,046	2,058	1,553	1,442
Possess and/or use cannabis	9,282	8,086	7,398	5,525	5,371
Other cannabis offences	4,360	3,814	3,298	2,160	2,061
Total cannabis offences	18,114	16,057	15,782	10,777	10,487
Total illicit drug offences	22,929	20,742	20,682	15,553	16,029
% cannabis	79.00	77.41	76.31	69.29	65.43

=== Bias ===
Māori when accounting for rates of use and offending history, are four times more likely than non-Māori to be convicted on cannabis charges. Similarly, enforcement is inequitable when considering gender, with men nine times more likely to be arrested compared with women.

== Medicinal use ==
Approved cannabis-based pharmaceuticals can be prescribed by a specialist doctor, but requires patients to meet strict criteria. As of April 2016, only Sativex is approved for use in New Zealand; it is not subsidised, so patients must pay the full retail cost. Unapproved cannabis-based pharmaceuticals (e.g. Cesamet, Marinol) and non-pharmaceutical cannabis products can be approved on case-by-case basis by the Minister of Health. On 9 June 2015, Associate Health Minister Peter Dunne approved the one-off use of Elixinol, a cannabidiol (CBD) product from the United States for a coma patient, and on 4 April 2016, he approved the one-off use of Aceso Calm Spray, a non-pharmaceutical-grade CBD cannabis-based product for a patient with a severe case of Tourette syndrome. These two cases are the only ones to this date to have been approved by the Health Minister. As of 1 April 2020 and the introduction of the Medical Cannabis Scheme, CBD products may be prescribed by any doctor registered to practice in New Zealand. A CBD product does not require ministerial approval to be prescribed, supplied or dispensed anymore. They are now regarded as normal prescription medicines. As with all prescription medicines, patients must have a prescription from an authorised prescriber to use CBD products.

The New Zealand Medical Association (NZMA) supports having evidence-based, peer-reviewed studies of medical cannabis. In 2010 the New Zealand Law Commission made a recommendation to allow for its medical use. The NZMA, which made submissions on the issues paper, supports the stance put forward by the Law Commission. GreenCross New Zealand was the first legally registered support group fighting for patient rights to access cannabis as medicine; however, this group is now defunct due to not filing financial statements. As of September 2017 the only explicitly medical advocacy group is Medical Cannabis Awareness New Zealand (MCANZ) a registered charity dedicated to legal access for patients now, and is mildly successful with the non-pharmaceutical route, having introduced Tilray for a small number of patients thereby allowing NZ stocks to be held.

In 2015, Alex Renton became the first person in New Zealand to be legally treated with medicinal cannabis under a special exemption. His case was the subject of a campaign by his family, including activist Rose Renton. Peter Dunne, then the Associate Health Minister, approved the use of Elixinol cannabis oil in his case.

In December 2017, it was announced that medicinal use will be legalised, in order to "ease suffering" for those with "terminal illnesses or chronic pain". Those qualified to receive prescriptions will be able to purchase medicinal cannabis from licensed pharmacies. Additionally, the terminally ill who are found to possess cannabis without a license will not be prosecuted or penalised. Minister of Health David Clark stated that "the compassionate measure legalises what some people are already doing, and will ensure no prosecutions while the new prescribing framework is set-up." The particulars were to be discussed in the future.

In August 2018 Hikurangi Cannabis became the first New Zealand company to be issued a license to cultivate cannabis for medical purposes.

A medicinal cannabis industry body, the New Zealand Medical Cannabis Council was established in September 2018.

The Misuse of Drugs (Medicinal Cannabis) Amendment Act was passed on 11 December 2018 and received royal assent on 17 December. It gives patients in palliative care the right to possess and use cannabis while also providing them with a defence to possess and use even illegal cannabis. A de facto limit of 28 grams or 100 joints applies due to the presumption of supply provision, which remains unchanged. Furthermore, the new law also facilitates manufacturing of medicinal cannabis products for local and international markets, which is hoped to be a viable economic avenue for deprived Māori communities to turn the "thriving illegal industry into a thriving legal one."

Medicinal cannabis use grew by 84% in 2020 to 1,842 prescriptions per month. The most common reason for use was chronic pain. Due to issues around access and cost, New Zealand also has a subculture of illicit medicinal cannabis growers and suppliers known as green fairies.

In December 2019, Misuse of Drugs (Medicinal Cannabis) Regulations 2019 were made having a commencement date of 1 April 2020. They brought into effect the Medicinal Cannabis Scheme which certifies to a minimum quality standard various psychoactive cannabis products for medicinal use within New Zealand. On 23 July 2020, approvals were expected within a few months. A list of currently approved psychoactive medicinal products is available on the Ministry of Health website.

== Public opinion ==
A representative sample of 1,022 New Zealanders who filled out an online survey from July to August 2020 regarding their positivity towards the Cannabis Legalisation and Control Bill (CLCB) that was about to be voted on in the 2020 New Zealand cannabis referendum, indicated their positive support for the bill by age as follows:

- 18–25: 69.1% positive support for the CLCB
- 26–45: 57.1% positive support for the CLCB
- 46–65: 47.9% positive support for the CLCB
- 65+: 39.2% positive support for the CLCB

A poll of Māori people in New Zealand in 2020 found that 75% of respondents were in favour of the legalisation of cannabis.

In a poll of 833 people in New Zealand in March 2021, 49% supported the legalisation of cannabis, 20% supported the decriminalisation of cannabis but not legalisation, 18% supported the current prohibition laws surrounding cannabis in New Zealand, 12% wanted to see more cannabis prosecutions, and 1% of respondents were unsure.

Results of a poll of 2,037 people in New Zealand published in March 2023 showed that 93.2% wanted cannabis laws in New Zealand to be relaxed, while 6.8% of respondents said cannabis laws in New Zealand should remain the same or be strengthened. 64.2% of the respondents that indicated they want cannabis laws in New Zealand to be relaxed favoured the legalisation of cannabis, while 35.3% of those that want cannabis laws relaxed said they support the decriminalisation of cannabis in New Zealand, and the remaining 0.5% indicated they were unsure of how they wanted cannabis laws relaxed.

=== Notable supporters of recreational cannabis legalisation ===
==== Individuals ====
- Michael Appleby, leader of the Aotearoa Legalise Cannabis Party
- Israel Adesanya, mixed martial artist, kickboxer, and former boxer
- Helen Clark, former Prime Minister of New Zealand (1999–2008)
- Dr Hinemoa Elder, New Zealand youth forensic psychiatrist
- Abe Gray, founder of the Whakamana Cannabis Museum and high-profile cannabis activist and protester
- Dakta Green, founder of The Daktory former cannabis club
- Andrew Little, Labour Party MP and former Minister of Justice
- Dun Mihaka, Māori activist, author, and political candidate for the Aotearoa Legalise Cannabis Party
- Shai Navot, former leader of The Opportunities Party
- Sam Neill, actor, director, producer, and screenwriter
- Tamatha Paul, Wellington City Councillor
- Diane Robertson, community leader
- Tim Shadbolt, Mayor of Invercargill, Mayor of Waitemata City
- Chlöe Swarbrick, Green Party MP
- Tiki Taane, musician and producer
- Nándor Tánczos, Rastafarian former Green Party MP
- Metiria Turei, former female co-leader of the Green Party
- Topp Twins, folk singers and activist sister comedy duo
- Rose Renton, a medicinal cannabis activist and campaigner

==== Organisations ====
- Helen Clark Foundation. In September 2019, the Foundation issued a report analysing the impact of the current law and supporting legalisation.
- New Zealand Drug Foundation, charity that campaigned with notable individuals
- NORML New Zealand, cannabis law reform organisation

==== Political parties ====
- Aotearoa Legalise Cannabis Party
- Green Party
- The Opportunities Party
- ACT New Zealand

=== Notable opponents of recreational cannabis legalisation ===
==== Individuals ====
- Paula Bennett, former Deputy Prime Minister of New Zealand (2016–17)
- Simeon Brown, National Party MP
- Eroni Clarke, former rugby union player
- Efeso Collins, Auckland Councillor
- Judith Collins, then National Party Leader and Leader of the Opposition (2020–2021)
- Patrick Drumm, Mount Albert Grammar School Principal
- James Farmer, Queen's Counsel
- Kate Hawkesby, radio announcer and television presenter
- Mike Hosking, television and radio broadcaster
- Aaron Ironside, SAM NZ Spokesperson, counsellor, pastor and broadcaster.
- John Key, former Prime Minister of New Zealand (2008–2016)
- Christopher Luxon, Prime Minister of New Zealand
- Jo Luxton, Labour Party candidate for Rangitata
- Dr Muriel Newman, former ACT New Zealand politician
- Wynton Rufer, former professional footballer
- Nick Smith, National Party MP
- David Tua, former professional boxer

==== Organisations ====
- Family First New Zealand, conservative Christian lobby group
- The Salvation Army agreed with the need for decriminalisation but did not support the legalisation of cannabis as proposed in the referendum.
- SAM (Smart Approaches to Marijuana) NZ Coalition, a collective of more than 25 groups and individuals, including family organisations and faith-based organisations like the NZ Christian Network, the New Zealand Muslims Association, and Foundation for a Drug-Free World, a division of the Church of Scientology.

==== Political parties ====
- New Conservative Party, right-wing political party
- New Zealand National Party, centre-right political party

== See also ==
- Cannabis in the Cook Islands
