= The Daktory =

Former cannabis organisation in West Auckland, New Zealand

Coordinates: 36.901981399°S 174.6859980°E

The Daktory pictured with founder Dakta Green, while the warehouse was still operating

The Daktory was a warehouse catering for the sale and consumption of cannabis in New Lynn, West Auckland, New Zealand. The Daktory operated in open defiance of New Zealand drug legislation prohibiting the cultivation, possession, sale and consumption of cannabis; its founder Dakta Green was jailed for 23 months for the operation of the warehouse. Members were called 'Daktas' and are registered under a pseudonym of their choice. They paid a monthly fee to join which allowed them access to The Daktory or they paid a $5 general entry charge. Patrons had to be 18 years of age or older. Once inside, members would openly smoke cannabis using any of the many paraphernalia provided. At various times cannabis was also openly grown in and sold from the Daktory. Nationwide branches of the Daktory were planned for all major New Zealand cities and other areas of strong demand for cannabis.

== History ==
The Daktory evolved from a group of cannabis law reform supporters in Auckland, the home base of NORML New Zealand.

=== Auckland 420 ===
The founding members of the Daktory got to know each other through the short lived Auckland 420 sessions that took place in Albert Park from mid-2007 to mid-2008. The Auckland 420 sessions were established to show solidarity with the Dunedin 420 group that had been established in 2004.

=== The Cannabus ===
The group of activists centred on the Auckland 420 sessions were responsible for the genesis of Mary Jane the Cannabus, a rehabilitated old Bedford bus owned by NORML New Zealand that serves as a mobile cannabis law reform activism centre. As one of the core members of the Auckland group was moving back to Dunedin, a plan was hatched to take the Cannabus on a nationwide tour from Auckland to Dunedin once her rehabilitation was complete. The Cannabus tour took place from late March to early May 2008, visiting 42 towns and cities throughout New Zealand and having a high-profile public cannabis smoking session at 4:20pm in each town on each day of the tour. The bus was driven for the length of the tour by Dakta Green, Dakta Grower, and Dakta Fooz, who were joined for a few weeks, including two "smoke-in" protests at parliament, by NORML Communications Officer Danyl Strype. The tour was timed to arrive in Dunedin for Cannabis Awareness Week and J-Day, annual events put on by the Otago University NORML chapter.

=== New Lynn ===
After the tour a warehouse space in New Lynn, Waitakere was acquired to permanently store the Cannabus when it was not on the road. This space is located at 80 Delta Avenue, New Lynn, the current location of the Daktory. The factory is owned by Jacqueline & Brian Clarke and the Onehunga Trustee Company Limited.

== Media interest ==
Dakta Green has appeared in the media numerous times promoting the Daktory, initially gaining notoriety as a candidate for the Aotearoa Legalise Cannabis Party in the 2009 Mt. Albert by-election resulting from the resignation of Helen Clark. Stories about the Daktory have appeared in The Western Leader, The New Zealand Herald, the Sunday News and TV3 News. Dakta Green and the Daktory are covered in the feature documentary Druglawed.

== Police raid ==
The New Zealand Police raided the Daktory on Saturday, January 9, 2010 apparently acting on information gained from a Sunday News journalist.

== Court case ==
Dakta Green is involved in several ongoing court cases for cannabis offences under the Misuse of Drugs Act 1975. In one case he has been granted permission to deliver a submission arguing that alcohol is more harmful than cannabis.

== See also ==
- Cannabis in New Zealand
- Otago University NORML
