= Sudafed =

Brand of nasal decongestants

Sudafed is a brand name and registered trademark for over the counter (OTC) decongestants manufactured by McNeil Laboratories (a division of Johnson & Johnson) for sale in Australia, New Zealand, Canada, Ireland, South Africa, the United Kingdom, and the United States. Before being acquired by Johnson & Johnson in 2006, Sudafed was owned by Pfizer.

Sudafed is used to treat symptoms of the common cold, sinusitis and nasal congestion.

The original formulation of Sudafed contains the active ingredient pseudoephedrine, but formulations without pseudoephedrine are also being sold under the Sudafed brand.

In 2016 it was one of the biggest selling branded over-the-counter medications sold in Great Britain, with sales of £34.4 million.

== Active ingredients ==
The brand name Sudafed is used for several formulations that contain different active ingredients:

Pseudoephedrine
The active ingredient (as the hydrochloride salt) of the original Sudafed. In the UK, this is now sold under the name "Sudafed Decongestant". As of 2015 "Sudafed Sinus - Pressure & Pain" tablets contain Pseudoephedrine Hydrochloride.
Phenylephrine hydrochloride
These products are sold as alternatives to pseudoephedrine formulations. In the United Kingdom, formulations containing phenylephrine are sold under various names (Sudafed Blocked Nose capsules, Sudafed Blocked Nose & Sinus capsules, Sudafed Mucus Relief Triple Action Cold & Flu tablets, Sudafed Sinus Pressure & Pain tablets, and Sudafed Day & Night capsules). In other countries the name "Sudafed PE" is used.
Oxymetazoline hydrochloride
The active ingredient in products using the name Sudafed OM in the United States; these are formulated as topical nasal sprays.
Xylometazoline hydrochloride
The active ingredient in a product formulated as topical nasal spray and sold in the United Kingdom under the name Sudafed Blocked Nose Spray.

In the UK, some Sudafed-branded products containing phenylephrine also contain other active ingredients:

Paracetamol (a.k.a. acetaminophen)
Sudafed Blocked Nose capsules, Sudafed Blocked Nose & Sinus capsules, Sudafed Day & Night capsules, and Sudafed Mucus Relief Triple Action Cold & Flu tablets
Ibuprofen
Sudafed Sinus Pressure & Pain tablets
Caffeine
Sudafed Day & Night capsules (day capsules only) and Sudafed Blocked Nose & Sinus capsules
Guaifenesin
Sudafed Mucus Relief Triple Action Cold & Flu tablets

== Switch to phenylephrine ==
In late 2004, Pfizer publicly disclosed its plans to make available a new over-the-counter product, Sudafed PE, which does not include pseudoephedrine. Decongestants with other ingredients were completely converted to phenylephrine later in 2005. Original Sudafed is still offered behind the counter to customers 18 years of age or older upon request, requiring the customer to show ID and sign a sales log next to a record of their name and address.

The new product was prompted by existing and proposed restrictions on the availability of pseudoephedrine-based products. U.S. state laws imposing such restrictions were in response to pseudoephedrine's role as an ingredient used to synthesize the stimulant methamphetamine.

Several pharmacists have questioned the effectiveness of orally-administered phenylephrine as a nasal decongestant. At least one meta-analysis has concluded that it is more effective than placebos, while other research has not found sufficient evidence to support this claim.

== Regulation on sale ==
=== Australia ===
In Australia, Sudafed with up to 60 mg of pseudoephedrine is available subject to a pharmacist matching the purchaser's identity to the Project STOP database to determine if the purchase history is consistent with personal use. Under Project STOP, a maximum of one pseudoephedrine containing drugs can be sold over the counter per day. However, doctors still retain the ability to prescribe the drugs. In Queensland, all pharmacists dispensing pseudoephedrine-based substances must use the Project STOP database. 2015 Prescription now required. If identification is not provided, the pharmacist may, at his or her discretion, still provide the medication.

=== Canada ===
In Canada, Sudafed is available "behind-the-counter" in two formulations—60 mg pseudoephedrine hydrochloride with 500 mg acetaminophen, or 30 mg pseudoephedrine hydrochloride with 200 mg Ibuprofen per caplet.

=== New Zealand ===
In New Zealand, Sudafed is sold as a controlled drug for addressing sinus congestion. In 2004, the New Zealand Parliament amended the Misuse of Drugs Act 1975 to reclassify cold and flu medicines containing pseudoephedrine as a controlled drug due to concerns that it was being used as a precursor drug in the production of methamphetamine. In 2011, New Zealand reclassified pseudoephedrine as a controlled prescribed drug under the Medicines Act 1981. In April 2024, the New Zealand Parliament passed the Misuse of Drugs (Pseudoephedrine) Amendment Act 2024, which allows 11 flu and cold medicines containing pseudoephedrine to be sold by registered pharmacists without prescriptions.

=== United Kingdom ===
In the United Kingdom, "Sudafed Decongestant" containing 60 mg of pseudoephedrine hydrochloride per tablet is available in packs of 12 tablets from pharmacies and is classified as a Pharmacy Only Medication ("[P]"), so any sale follows a series of questions from the pharmacist to determine if it is safe. Historically, packs of 24 tablets were also available, but the maximum pack size for OTC sales was reduced to 12 tablets as a measure to counteract misuse. The version that contains phenylephrine is not restricted and may be purchased off the shelf from supermarkets and other stores. As of 2015, "Sudafed Sinus - Pressure & Pain tablets" only contain 30 mg.

=== United States ===
In the United States, section 711 of the Combat Methamphetamine Epidemic Act of 2005 reclassifies phenylpropanolamine, pseudoephedrine and ephedrine as Schedule Listed Chemicals (SLC). SLCs were reduced by the Federal per-transaction sales limit from 9 grams to 3.6 grams. The amount recently proposed by the Administration requires behind-the-counter storage or locked cabinet storage.
