= Hansen v R =

Supreme Court of New Zealand case on reverse onus provisions and the Bill of Rights

- Court: Supreme Court of New Zealand
- Full case name: Paul Rodney Hansen v The Queen
- Decided: 20 February 2007
- Citation: [2007] NZSC 7
- Transcript: Available here

Case history
- Prior action: Court of Appeal (CA 128/05, 29 August 2005)

Court membership
- Judges sitting: Elias CJ, Blanchard, Tipping, McGrath and Anderson JJ

Keywords
- reverse onus of proof, presumption of innocence, New Zealand Bill of Rights Act 1990, Misuse of Drugs Act 1975

Hansen v R [2007] NZSC 7 is a decision of the Supreme Court of New Zealand concerning the compatibility of a reverse onus provision in the Misuse of Drugs Act 1975 with the presumption of innocence under the New Zealand Bill of Rights Act 1990 (NZBORA). Paul Rodney Hansen was convicted of possessing cannabis for supply after being found with over 28 grams of cannabis plant. Under section 6(6) of the Misuse of Drugs Act, a person in possession of more than that quantity was deemed to possess it for supply "until the contrary is proved." The question on appeal was whether this imposed a full legal burden of proof on the accused, and whether it could be read down under section 6 of NZBORA to be consistent with the right to be presumed innocent under section 25(c).

The Supreme Court unanimously dismissed the appeal. It held that the words "until the contrary is proved" impose a legal burden and cannot be interpreted as requiring only an evidential burden, as this would contradict the plain text of the provision. Because section 4 of NZBORA prevents courts from declining to apply an inconsistent enactment, section 6(6) had to be given full effect. The judges differed in their reasoning on the interplay of sections 4, 5, and 6 of NZBORA, with Elias CJ dissenting on the role of section 5 in the interpretive exercise.

Hansen v R is the leading New Zealand authority on statutory interpretation under the NZBORA, establishing that section 6 requires courts to prefer a rights-consistent meaning where one is genuinely available, but does not authorise strained interpretations departing from clear parliamentary intent. It remains the definitive authority on reverse onus provisions in New Zealand criminal law.

== Background ==
Paul Rodney Hansen was convicted after a jury trial in the Invercargill District Court on a charge under s 6(1)(f) of the Misuse of Drugs Act 1975 of possession of cannabis plant for the purpose of supply (to a person under 18) or sale (to a person 18 or over). He was found on 26 May 2003 in joint possession with another man of more than 28 grams of cannabis plant, approximately 375 grams of clipped cannabis head and 1520 grams of other cannabis plant material.

Section 6(6) of the Misuse of Drugs Act provides that a person in possession of more than the specified quantity of a controlled drug (at the time, 28 grams or more of cannabis plant) is “until the contrary is proved” deemed to possess it for the purpose of supply or sale. The trial judge directed the jury that Hansen bore the legal burden of disproving that purpose on the balance of probabilities.

Hansen appealed unsuccessfully to the Court of Appeal (CA 128/05, 29 August 2005), which declined to depart from its earlier decision in R v Phillips [1991] 3 NZLR 175. Leave to appeal to the Supreme Court was granted on the question whether s 6(6) places a legal onus on the accused that is inconsistent with the right under s 25(c) NZBORA to be presumed innocent until proved guilty.

== Judgment ==
The Supreme Court dismissed the appeal by unanimous result, though the judges differed in their reasoning on the application of NZBORA ss 4–6.

All members of the Court held that the words "until the contrary is proved" in s 6(6) impose a legal burden of proof on the balance of probabilities, not merely an evidential burden. The provision could not be interpreted under s 6 NZBORA (preference for a meaning consistent with Bill of Rights rights) as requiring only that the accused raise a reasonable doubt, because that would contradict the plain statutory text and purpose.

Because of s 4 NZBORA (which prevents courts from declining to apply an inconsistent enactment), s 6(6) had to be given effect despite its inconsistency with the presumption of innocence in s 25(c) NZBORA.

Elias CJ wrote separately, holding that s 5 NZBORA (justified limitations) does not form part of the s 6 interpretive exercise. She viewed the presumption of innocence as unqualified and considered s 6 requires consistency with the right as enacted, not as limited under s 5. However, she agreed the appeal must be dismissed under s 4.

The other judges (Blanchard, Tipping, McGrath and Anderson JJ) applied a structured analysis (consistent with the approach in Moonen v Film and Literature Board of Review) that included consideration under s 5, ultimately concluding the reverse onus was a demonstrably justified limitation in a free and democratic society.

== Significance ==
Hansen v R is a leading authority on statutory interpretation under the New Zealand Bill of Rights Act 1990, particularly the inter-relationship of ss 4, 5 and 6. It clarified that s 6 requires courts to prefer a rights-consistent meaning where one is tenable on the text and purpose of the enactment, but does not authorise “strained” interpretations that depart from what Parliament clearly intended.

The case remains the definitive New Zealand authority on reverse onus provisions in criminal legislation (especially drug offences) and the limits of rights-consistent interpretation. It has been influential in later discussions of implied declarations of inconsistency and the role of the courts in human-rights adjudication under the NZBORA.
