= Hawkesby =

Hawkesby is a surname. Notable people with the surname include:

- John Hawkesby (born 1947), New Zealand television journalist
- Kate Hawkesby (born 1973), New Zealand television journalist and radio personality, daughter of John
