= Who Wants to Be a Millionaire? New Zealand =

New Zealand game show

- Logo
- Also known as: Millionaire
- Genre: Game show
- Created by: David Briggs; Mike Whitehill; Steven Knight
- Directed by: Peter Ots
- Presented by: Mike Hosking
- Composers: Keith Strachan; Matthew Strachan; Ramon Covalo; Nick Magnus
- Country of origin: New Zealand
- Original language: English
- No. of seasons: 1
- No. of episodes: 10

Production
- Production locations: Richmond, Victoria, Australia
- Running time: 60 minutes (with commercials)
- Production company: 2waytraffic

Original release
- Network: TV One
- Release: 9 September – 11 November 2008

Who Wants to Be a Millionaire? New Zealand is a New Zealand game show based on the original British format of Who Wants to Be a Millionaire?. The show was hosted by Mike Hosking. The main goal of the game was to win one million New Zealand dollars by answering 15 multiple-choice questions correctly. There were four "lifelines". It was broadcast on the TVNZ station TV One. The show was taped in Melbourne, Australia, on the set of the Australian version of the show.

== Notable history ==
One contestant, Kristin Castle, made New Zealand television history after walking away with NZ$250,000, the highest amount of money ever given to a single person on New Zealand television. The show received wide media coverage after the first ever contestant on the show, Courtney Washington, walked away with nothing after incorrectly answering the question about BMW supplying New Zealand's new fleet of ministerial limousines.

== Rules ==
As in the syndicated United States' version, contestants were selected for the show through a qualifying test instead of the traditional "Fastest Finger First" as seen on the British version. Contestants sit in the "Hot Seat" and are asked increasingly difficult general knowledge questions by the host. Questions are multiple choice and contestants choose between a possible four answers, sometimes with the aid of lifelines. On answering a question correctly the contestant plays for a bigger sum of money, getting ever closer to the maximum amount of one million dollars.

The traditional 15-question money tree was used and there was no clock.

The complete sequence of prizes is as follows. Guaranteed safe levels, where the contestant is guaranteed this amount of money to take home, regardless of any subsequent questions they may get wrong, are in bold.

Prize levels
Question number	Question value
Question number	(Yellow zones are the guaranteed levels)
1	$100
2	$200
3	$300
4	$500
5	**$1,000**
6	$2,000
7	$4,000
8	$8,000
9	$16,000
10	**$32,000**
11	$64,000
12	$125,000
13	$250,000
14	$500,000
15	**$1,000,000**

The contestants' run ends when they either answer a question incorrectly, decide to not answer a question and walk away with their prize money, or if they answer all 15 questions correctly (winning $1 million).

== Lifelines ==
If at any point the contestants are unsure of the answer to a question, they use one or more "lifelines". After using lifelines, contestants can either answer the question, use another lifeline, or walk away and keep the money (except for the Switch lifeline).

- 50/50: The contestant asks the host to have the computer randomly eliminate two of the incorrect answer choices, leaving the contestant with a choice between the correct answer and one incorrect one.
- Phone a Friend: Contestants may call one of up to three prearranged friends. The contestant must provide the three friends' names and phone numbers in advance. The contestant has thirty seconds to read the four choices to the friend, who must select an answer before the time runs out. Phone-a-friends often express their certainty as a percentage (I am 80% sure it's C).
- Ask the Audience: The contestant polls the studio audience to ask them which answer they believe is correct. Members of the studio audience indicate their choices using an audience response system. The results are immediately displayed on the contestant's and host's screens. This is a popular lifeline, known for its near-perfect accuracy.
- Switch the Question: This lifeline becomes available only after the contestant has correctly answered the $32,000 question. If the contestant has not chosen a final answer on the revealed question, this lifeline entitles the contestant to switch out the original question for another question of the same value. Once the contestant elects to use this lifeline, he or she cannot return to the original question, and thus the correct answer is revealed for the record. In addition, any lifelines used by the contestant while attempting to answer the original revealed question prior to the question switch will not be reinstated.
