= Tararua College =

Location
- Churchill Street, Pahiatua, New Zealand; 40.4560°S 175.8338°E

Information
- Type: State, Co-educational, Secondary (Year 9–15)
- Motto: Māori: Tama Tu Tama Ora "those who strive live fully"
- Established: 1960
- Ministry of Education Institution no.: 235
- Principal: Iain Anderson
- Enrolment: 383 (July 2026)
- Socio-economic decile: 3I
- Website: www.tararuacollege.school.nz

Tararua College is a secondary school in Pahiatua, New Zealand, with approximately 407 students.

== History ==
Tararua College opened in 1960. Like most New Zealand state secondary school opened in the 1960s, the school was built to the Nelson common design plan, characterised by two-storey H-shaped classroom blocks, of which the school has one. The regional station Tararua TV was started in 2004, in an egg-carton lined room at the school. In 2006, pupil brawls and abuse of teachers at the school was effectively stopped with the introduction of a ban on student cellphones. Later that year a student teacher was forced to resign after admitting an affair with a pupil of the school.

== Enrolment ==
As of July 2026, Tararua College has a roll of 383 students, of which 159 (41.5%) identify as Māori.

As of 2026, the school has an Equity Index of 510, placing it amongst schools whose students have many socioeconomic barriers to achievement (roughly equivalent to deciles 2 and 3 under the former socio-economic decile system).

== Notable alumni ==
- Heather McRae, principal of Diocesan School for Girls in Auckland.
- Roger Sowry, government cabinet minister, former head boy
- Michael Mason, New Zealand Blackcap cricketer
- Tara Drysdale, New Zealand Blackstick
- Dame Diane Robertson, community leader
