= Misuse of Drugs (Pseudoephedrine) Amendment Act 2024 =

Proposed Act of Parliament in New Zealand

New Zealand Parliament
- Royal assent: 11 April 2024

Legislative history
- Introduced by: David Seymour
- Committee responsible: Health
- First reading: 20 February 2024
- Second reading: 19 March 2024
- Third reading: 9 April 2024
- Passed: 9 April 2024
- Status: Current legislation

The Misuse of Drugs (Pseudoephedrine) Amendment Act 2024 is a New Zealand Act of Parliament which reclassifies pseudoephedrine as a Class C controlled drug, allowing cold and flu medicines containing the drug to be sold without prescriptions in pharmacies. Pseudoephedrine had previously been classified as a Class B prescription-only drug in 2011 since it was used as a methamphetamine precursor ingredient. On 9 April 2024, the bill passed its third reading and received royal assent on 11 April.

== Key provisions ==
The Misuse of Drugs (Pseudoephedrine) Amendment Act 2024 amends the Misuse of Drugs Act 1975 to reclassify pseudoephedrine as a partially exempted drug that can be supplied and administered without prescription. The Act also downgrades pseudoephedrine from a Class B to a Class controlled drug.

== Background ==
Before 2004, cold and flu medicines containing pseudoephedrine could be purchased without prescriptions from pharmacies. In 2004, due to concerns that pseudoephedrine was being used as a precursor ingredient in the manufacture of methamphetamine, it was classified as a controlled drug under the Misuse of Drugs Act 1975. In 2011, the New Zealand Government reclassified pseudoephedrine as a controlled prescribed drug under the Medicines Act 1981. The drug is sold under the brand name Sudafed as a prescription medicine for addressing sinus congestion.

During the 2023 New Zealand general election, the ACT party campaigned on reversing a 2011 law classifying pseudoephedrine as a prescribed pharmaceutical drug. ACT leader David Seymour argued that this restriction limited the supply of over the counter cold and flu medication. Following the formation of a National-led coalition government consisting of the New Zealand National Party, ACT and New Zealand First in late November 2024, the Government agreed to ease restrictions on the sale of pseudoephedrine as part of National's coalition agreement with ACT.

== Legislative history ==
On 20 February 2024, associate health minister Seymour confirmed that the Government would introduce legislation to allow pseudoephedrine to be sold over the counter, effective 2025. In response, some pharmacists and doctors have expressed concern that easing restrictions on the sale of pseudoephedrine would endanger pharmacy staff and that the proposed law change was unnecessary due to the availability of alternative drugs. That same day, the Misuse of Drugs (Pseudoephedrine) Amendment Bill passed its first reading and was referred to the New Zealand Parliament's health select committee.

Submissions on the bill were held between 21 and 26 February 2024. During that period, the health select committee received submissions from 169 individuals and nine organisations, including 13 oral submissions. The health committee subsequently recommended that the bill be passed without amendments and that pseudoephedrine be permitted to be sold without prescriptions by registered pharmacists. The New Zealand Labour Party and the Green Party of Aotearoa New Zealand expressed concerns about the shortened public consultation timeframe and that deregulation could worsen addiction and methamphetamine production in the community. The Greens also supported a full review of the Misuse of Drugs Act 1975. Associate health minister Seymour confirmed that the decision to deregulate pseudoephedrine had been made at the Cabinet level to harmonise New Zealand's drug policy with other Five Eyes countries and was not solely motivated by political considerations.

The bill passed its second reading on 19 March 2024 and was referred to the Committee of the Whole House on 27 March. On 9 April, the bill passed its third reading with unanimous support from all parties. It received royal assent on 11 April 2024.
