= Presumption of supply in New Zealand =

In New Zealand, the presumption of supply is a rebuttable presumption in criminal law which is governed by the New Zealand Misuse of Drugs Act 1975. It provides an assumption in drug-possession cases that if a person is found with more than a specified amount of a controlled drug, they are in possession of it for the purpose of supply or sale. This shifts the burden of proof from the Crown to the person found with the drug, who must prove that they possessed it for personal use and not for supply. Note that once the burden of proof has shifted, the burden is one on the balance of probabilities (rather than beyond reasonable doubt). This presumption exists to make prosecution for supplying drugs easier.

In 2007, the Supreme Court ruled that the presumption of supply is inconsistent with section 25(c) of the New Zealand Bill of Rights Act 1990.

== History ==
Although drug regulation began in New Zealand with the regulation of opium during the late 19th century, it was not until 1965 that the offence of supply was differentiated from that of possession.

=== Single Convention on Narcotic Drugs 1961 ===
During the 1960s, the United Nations consolidated and broadened earlier drug treaties. The Single Convention on Narcotic Drugs 1961 came into force in 1964 when 40 countries, including New Zealand, ratified it. The convention, influenced by the United States prohibition model of drug regulation, was ratified by New Zealand in 1963. In its commentary on the convention, the United Nations General Assembly endorsed the use of presumptions.

=== Narcotics Act 1965 ===
New Zealand implemented the 1961 convention in its Narcotics Act 1965. The Narcotics Act introduced a distinction between offenders who trafficked in narcotics and those who possessed (or used) them, with penalties for drug dealing much harsher than those for possession or use. In support of this, the act introduced a presumption of possession for the purpose of supply. When a person was found in possession of an amount of a scheduled drug exceeding a specified level, the burden of proof shifted to the accused to prove that the drugs were for personal use and not for supply to others. If the person could not meet this burden, they could be convicted of the more serious offence of dealing narcotics.

=== Misuse of Drugs Act 1975 ===
The Misuse of Drugs Act 1975 continued the policy introduced in the Narcotics Act by setting a presumption of supply. Section 6(6) of the act creates a presumption that when a person is found in possession of a quantity of a controlled drug equivalent to (or exceeding) the amount specified in the act's schedules, they possess the drug for the purpose of supplying it to others. The legal burden of proof then shifts to the defendant to prove that he or she did not possess the drug for purposes of supply and it was intended for personal use. This reverse onus clause is controversial because of its inconsistency with the New Zealand Bill of Rights Act 1990, which stipulates that every person is presumed innocent until proven guilty.

Several problems with the act have emerged during the 30 years since its enactment, and it is uncertain whether it now provides a coherent, effective legislative framework. It has been questioned whether the statutory presumption of possession for supply should continue to apply after the Supreme Court's decision in R v Hansen.

== Application ==
=== Current thresholds ===
The presumption of supply thresholds are set out in Schedule 5 of the Misuse of Drugs Act 1975. As of December 2016, the thresholds are as follows:

Amount	Applicable drugs
2.5 milligrams	Lysergide (LSD)
25 milligrams	25B-NBOMe; 25C-NBOMe; 25I-NBOMe
100 milligrams	DOB (bromo-DMA)
250 milligrams	Tetrahydrocannabinol
0.5 grams	Cocaine; Heroin
5 grams	Amphetamine; Morphine; MDMA; MDA; Cannabis preparations BZP; TFMPP pFPP; MeOPP mCPP; MBZP; Methamphetamine
10 grams	Ketamine; Ephedrine; Pseudoephedrine
28 grams	Cannabis plant
56 grams	all other controlled drugs

=== Bill of Rights Act 1990 ===
The New Zealand Bill of Rights Act 1990 sets out the rights and freedoms of anyone subject to New Zealand law, and is part of the country's uncodified constitution. The act protects fundamental rights and freedoms in New Zealand society in a general, rather than absolute, sense. When an act is prima facie inconsistent with a right or freedom contained in the Bill of Rights, the starting point for that act's application is to examine that meaning against the guaranteed right to see if the right is curtailed. If so, the Bill of Rights' interpretive provisions (sections 4, 5 and 6) are engaged.

==== Presumption of innocence: Section 25(c) ====
Section 25(c) of the Bill of Rights Act 1990 affirms the right of anyone charged with an offence to be presumed innocent until proven guilty according to law. It establishes that the burden of proof of guilt in criminal cases is carried by the prosecutor, who must prove the accused's guilt beyond reasonable doubt. It is widely-acknowledged common law that the prosecution must prove guilt even when an affirmative defence is argued. A provision requiring an accused person to disprove the existence of a presumed fact, that fact being an important element of the offence in question (e.g. the presumption of supply) generally violates the presumption of innocence in section 25(c).

==== Section 4 ====
Section 4 specifies that the Bill of Rights Act is not supreme law. It provides that courts hearing cases under the act cannot repeal or revoke, make invalid or ineffective, or decline to apply any provision of any statute made by Parliament because it is inconsistent with any provision in the Bill of Rights Act. This is the case whether the statute was passed before or after the Bill of Rights Act. Another statute will prevail if it is inconsistent with the Bill of Rights Act and cannot be said to be a justified limitation under section 5 or interpreted consistently with the Bill of Rights Act under section 6.

==== Section 5 ====
Section 5 provides that if legislation is found to be prima facie inconsistent with a particular right or freedom, it may be consistent with the Bill of Rights Act if the inconsistency is a justified limitation. The application of section 5 is two-fold; the courts must look at whether the provision serves an important and significant objective, and if there is a rational and proportionate connection between that objective and the provision.

Case law in overseas jurisdictions suggests that restricting the supply of illicit drugs is a pressing social objective which might, in certain circumstances, justify limitations on the presumption of innocence. This was accepted in New Zealand by the Supreme Court in the leading case of R v Hansen; however, a majority of the court found that the reverse onus of the presumption of supply contained in section 6(6) of the Misuse of Drugs Act 1975 was unconnected to the objective or a disproportionate response to the problem.

==== Section 6 ====
Section 6 states that where an act can be given a meaning consistent with the rights and freedoms contained in the Bill of Rights, that meaning shall be preferred to any other; this was the basis of the appeal in R v Hansen.

=== R v Hansen (2007) ===
The leading New Zealand case on the presumption of supply is R v Hansen, where the appellant was charged with possession of cannabis for the purpose of supply. Hansen argued that being required to persuade a jury that he did not possess cannabis for the purpose of sale or supply was inconsistent with his right under section 25(c) of the Bill of Rights Act 1990, the presumption of innocence until proven guilty. He argued that section 6 of the Bill of Rights Act required section 6(6) of the Misuse of Drugs Act 1975 to be given a meaning consistent with the presumption of innocence.

Hansen contended that consistency with the presumption of innocence would be achieved if section 6(6) of the Misuse of Drugs Act 1975 was construed to impose an evidential burden on him which, if accepted by the jury, might create a reasonable doubt of his possession being for supply. This would impose the legal onus on the Crown to satisfy the jury beyond reasonable doubt that the appellant was in possession of drugs for supply.

The majority of the court found that the reverse onus in section 6(6) of the Misuse of Drugs Act 1975 was not rationally connected to the objective or it was not a proportionate response to the problem, and was in breach of section 25(c) of the Bill of Rights Act 1990. However, section 4 of the Bill of Rights Act forced the court to allow the presumption-of-supply clause to prevail, and Hansen's appeal was unsuccessful.

== Criticism and reform ==
In the Hansen decision, several judges criticised the fact that the courts are constitutionally bound by section 4 of the Bill of Rights Act to uphold legislation they have concluded is inconsistent with the Bill of Rights. The New Zealand Law Commission's 2011 report on controlling and regulating drugs contained several criticisms of the Misuse of Drugs Act 1975. Considering how to best address the problem of proof that the presumption of supply seeks to remedy, while respecting the protection conferred by section 25(c), the commission proposed the removal of the offence of possession for supply in favour of an offence of possession.

Responding to the report's recommendations, in September 2011 the government issued a Regulatory Impact Statement. Although several recommendations were implemented, it was found that greater clarity on the impact of costs and resources was required to determine the full effects of a new act and drug-classification system (including the presumption of supply).
