= Dakta Green =

New Zealand cannabis activist

Dakta Green, formerly Kenneth Morgan (born 1950, in Wellington) is a former New Zealand cannabis law reform activist and political candidate. He changed his name by public poll in 2008. He is the Activism co-ordinator for NORML New Zealand, the driver of Mary Jane the Cannabus, and founder of The Daktory. He was a candidate for the Aotearoa Legalise Cannabis Party in the 2009 Mount Albert by-election.

== Cannabis ==
In June 2019, Green announced to the public that he had opened a new cannabis club in Mount Victoria, Wellington. In an interview he claimed a membership of 700 for the newly minted club.

He was jailed for one year in Shasta County, California in 1999, and for two years and eight months in New Zealand from November 2002.

On 26 September 2011, the Solicitor General appealed the sentence of 8 months in prison and the Court of Appeal almost tripled the sentence to 23 months in prison.

Green is the focus of the 2011 TV3 documentary Inside New Zealand: High Time?, directed by Arik Reiss, and also features in the 2015 New Zealand documentary Druglawed.

== See also ==
- Cannabis in New Zealand
