= NORML New Zealand =

Cannabis law reform organisation

The logo of NORML New Zealand

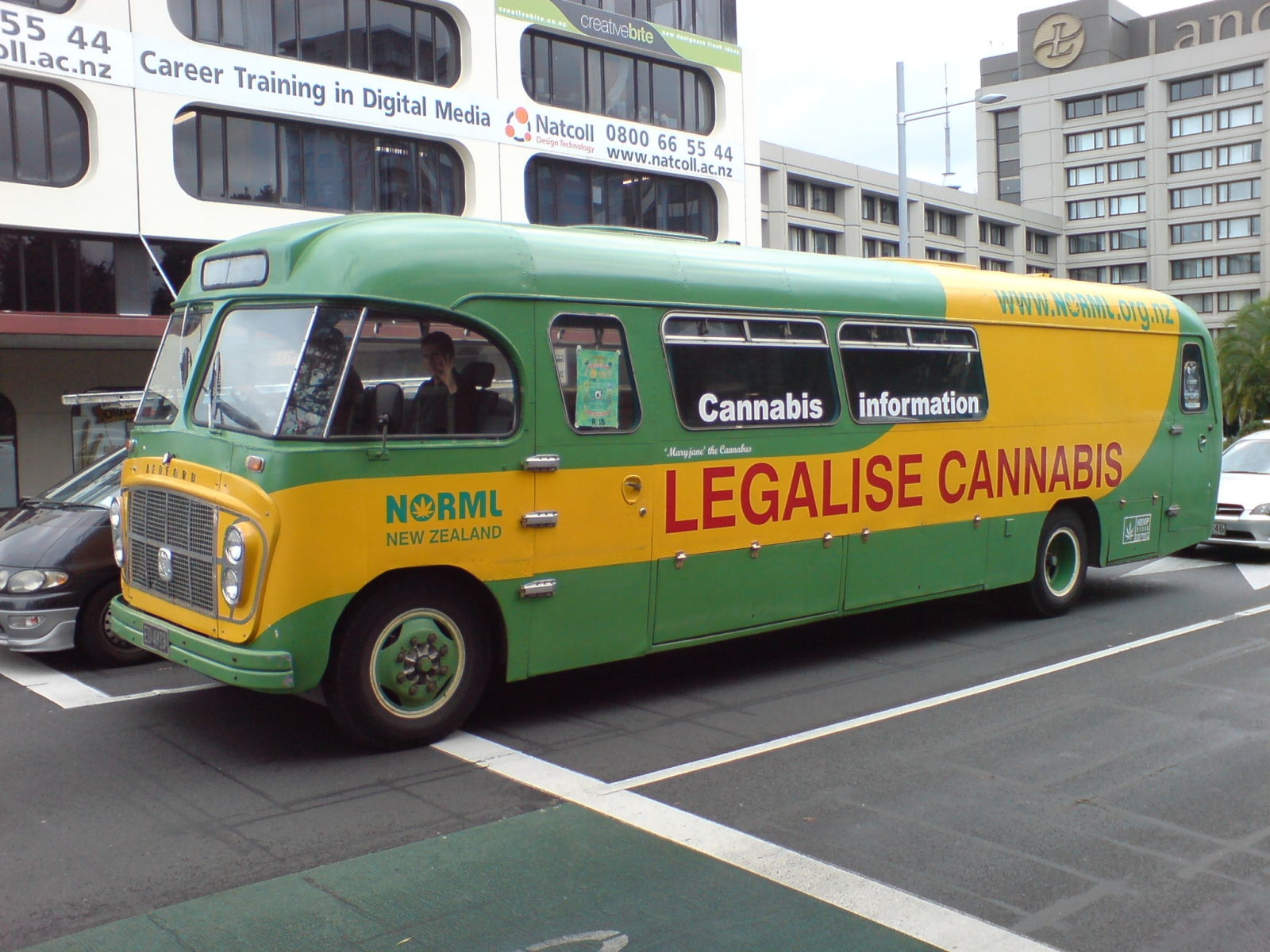
A campaign bus of the NORML New Zealand chapter.

NORML New Zealand is a cannabis law reform organisation in New Zealand. It is a National Chapter of the National Organization for the Reform of Marijuana Laws (NORML).

== Media and activism ==
NORML New Zealand publish the print and electronic quarterly magazine NORML News. Copies of the magazine were submitted to the Chief Censor in May 2010 by the Department of Internal Affairs for guidance on whether it should be censored.

"Mary Jane the Cannabus" is a Bedford bus belonging to NORML New Zealand that serves as a mobile cannabis law reform activism centre. Mary Jane is driven by Dakta Green and resides at The Daktory when not on the road. Mary Jane participated in a nationwide tour of New Zealand promoting cannabis law reform from March to May 2008.

In 2018, NORML New Zealand issued a submission supporting the Labour-led coalition government's Misuse of Drugs (Medicinal Cannabis) Amendment Act. They also advocated allowing a higher 5% tolerance for other cannaboids to improve production and affordability; making medical cannabis more accessible to patients with chronic or debilitating conditions where the doctor has prescribed the use of cannabis; legalizing the cultivation of cannabis; and adopting a herbal remedy approach towards non-pharmaceutical cannabis products. While supportive of the Government's proposed Medicinal Cannabis Access Scheme, it advocated a "patient-focused regime" as opposed to what it termed a "corporate pharmaceutical-style scheme." In response to the Government's upcoming cannabis referendum, NORML is one of the founding members of the Cannabis Referendum Coalition.

== Branches ==
Otago NORML is the group's local branch at the University of Otago in Dunedin.

== Notable members ==
- Abe Gray, founder of the Whakamana Cannabis Museum, high-profile cannabis activist and protester for almost two decades, served as Otago NORML president.

== See also ==
- Abe Gray
- Cannabis in New Zealand
- Otago NORML
