= Dun Mihaka =

New Zealand activist, author, and political candidate (1942–2023)

Te Ringa Mangu Netana "Dun" Mihaka (1942 – 22 August 2023) was a New Zealand Māori activist, author, and political candidate.

== Early life and family ==
Mihaka was born at Te Ahuahu in 1942 and was affiliated with the Ngāpuhi iwi. The son of Te Aroha and Hone Mihaka and a descendant of Ruatara, he attended Te Ahuahu Māori School and Northland College, later working as a labourer and joining the army.

Mihaka was the uncle of Peeni Henare.

== Activism ==
Mihaka was involved in a number of campaigns regarding Māori rights, including the Bastion Point land dispute. His 1979 attempts to use the Māori language in court were appealed to the Court of Appeal and were the trigger for the 1986 Waitangi Tribunal ruling that the government should introduce legislation making it an official language of New Zealand. He wrote two books on Māori issues. He is most known, however, for performing an act of whakapohane (baring his buttocks, a traditional Māori insult) to Diana, Princess of Wales and Charles, Prince of Wales in 1983. Some sources claim this was actually directed at the Queen herself; however, this is likely confused with a later incident in 1986 in which Mihaka was arrested for driving a van with an image of whakapohane in the vicinity of a royal motorcade. On that occasion, he was charged with dangerous driving.

In 2010, Mihaka was sentenced to 28 days in jail for contempt of court for calling a District Court judge an arsehole in open court.

== New Zealand election campaigns ==
Mihaka stood as an independent candidate in the Southern Maori electorate in the 1981, 1984, 1987, and 1990 elections. He either came last or second to last, with Whetu Tirikatene-Sullivan holding the electorate during that time. He then stood as an independent candidate for the Te Tai Tokerau electorate in the 1999 election, winning 1.03% of the vote. In 2004, he stood in the Te Tai Hauauru by-election, challenging the incumbent Tariana Turia. Mihaka stood as the candidate for the Aotearoa Legalise Cannabis Party, the only party other than Turia's Māori Party to contest the by-election. Mihaka claimed that the drugs issue was of greater importance to Māori than the foreshore and seabed controversy, which Turia largely focused on. In the by-election, Mihaka placed a distant second, winning 2.52% of the vote compared to Turia's 92.74%. He did, however, place above the four independent candidates.

== Death ==
Mihaka died on 22 August 2023, at the age of 81. His body was taken from Wellington to Parawhenua Marae, between Ōhaeawai and Lake Ōmāpere in Northland, for his tangihanga.
