= The Helen Clark Foundation =

New Zealand think tank

- Mahi a Rongo
- Formation: 2019
- Type: Public policy think tank
- Headquarters: 55 Wellesley Street East, Auckland CBD
- Location: New Zealand
- Executive Director: Murray Bruges
- Website: helenclark.foundation

The Helen Clark Foundation (Māori: Mahi a Rongo) is a New Zealand-based independent, non-partisan public policy think tank hosted by Auckland University of Technology.

The foundation was formed in 2019 and is named after Helen Clark, the 37th prime minister of New Zealand and former administrator of the United Nations Development Programme who serves as patron. Its mission is to create public policy research which promotes the values demonstrated by Helen Clark across her lengthy public career: inclusion, fairness, and sustainability.

== Board members ==
The founding executive director was Katherine (Kathy) Errington, a former diplomat. Its board currently includes Professor Peter Davis (Chair), Dr Hinemoa Elder, Dr Tamasailau Suaalii-Sauni, Rajen Prasad QSO, Helen Klisser During, Simon Mitchell and Geoff Pownall. Former board members include Dame Cindy Kiro and Joan Caulfield.

== Initiatives ==
=== Research reports ===
The foundation publishes research reports about a range of important public policy issues in New Zealand on its website. Previous reports have covered issues including climate change and decarbonisation, democracy, drug policy, sustainable cities, housing, and a series examining policy challenges emerging from the COVID-19 pandemic.

=== Projects ===
The foundation researched alcohol harm in 2021 in collaboration with Health Coalition Aotearoa. These unique data sets and subsequent media coverage are collated on the foundation's website.

It supports drug law reform, promoting a harm-minimisation approach to drug use that adopts a health-based rather than criminal justice framework. In September 2019, the foundation issued a report analysing the impact of the current laws around cannabis in New Zealand and supporting a legal regulatory framework for the possession and sale of cannabis. In September 2022, the foundation released a report in partnership with the New Zealand Drug Foundation that reviewed the use of methamphetamine in New Zealand, including the illicit market, use patterns, the regulatory environment and the harms caused. This report recommended a range of approaches to minimise the harms from methamphetamine by addressing both supply and demand, including the removal of criminal penalties for possession of small quantities, the expansion of the Te Ara Oranga programme , as well as other improved treatment and rehabilitation options.
