= 2009 Mount Albert by-election =

New Zealand by-election

- 13 June 2009
- Turnout: 20,943 (c. 60.8%)
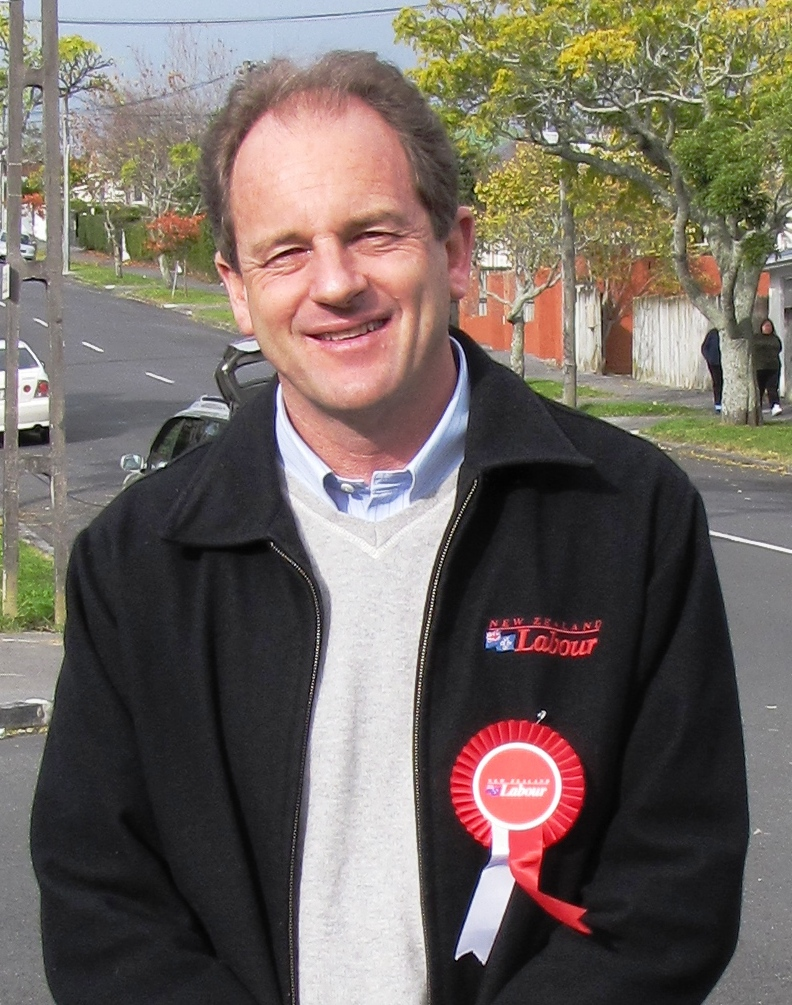

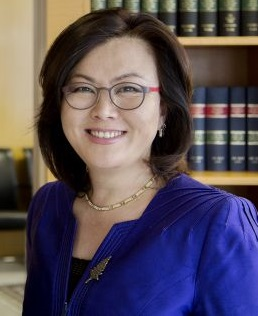

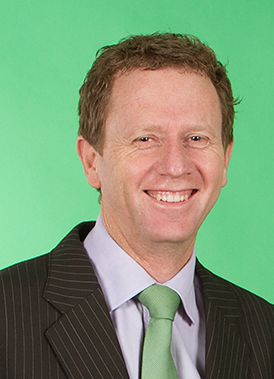

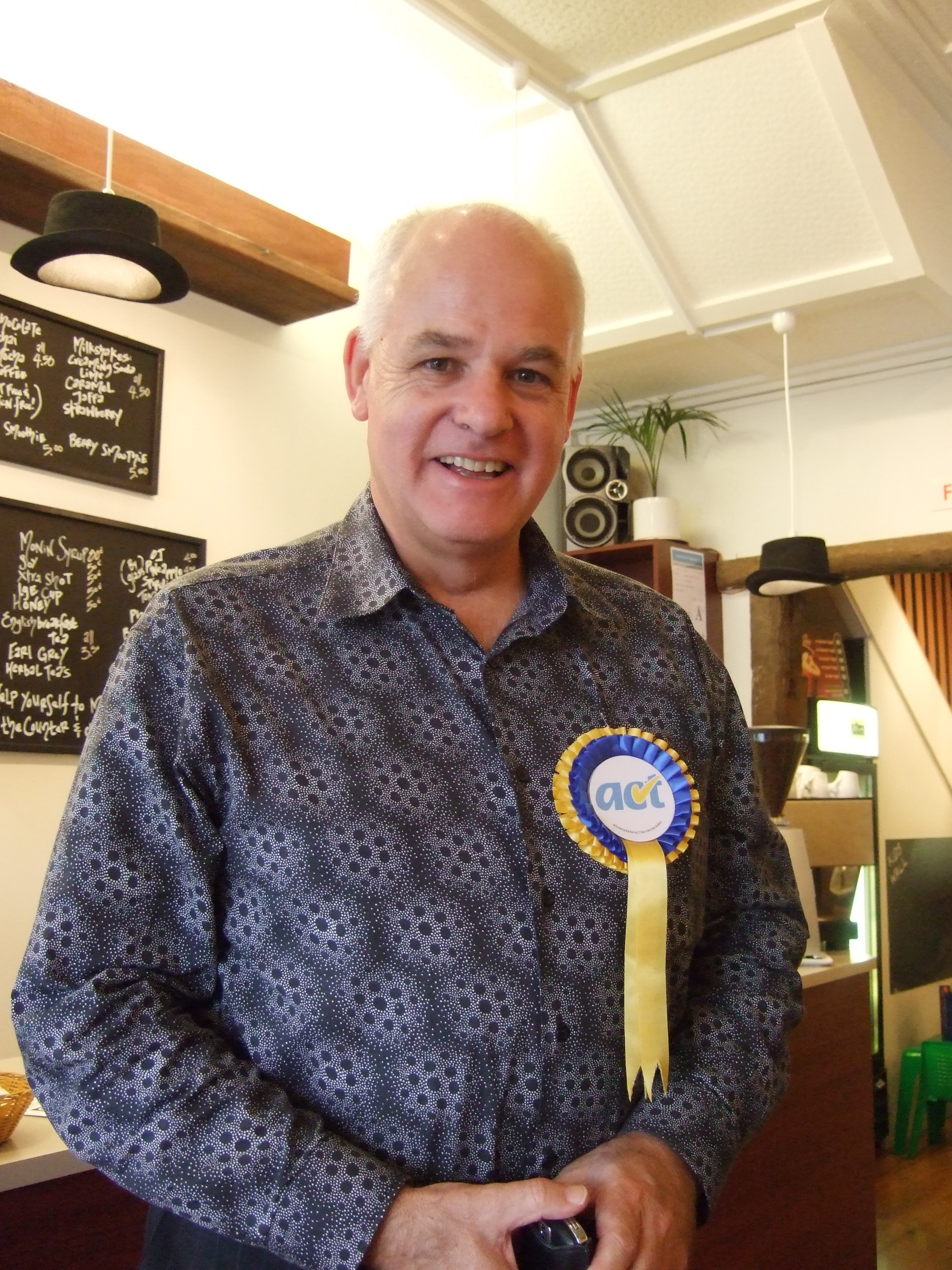
Candidate	David Shearer	Melissa Lee
Party	Labour	National
Popular vote	13,260	3,542
Percentage	63.31%	16.91%
Candidate	Russel Norman	John Boscawen
Party	Green	ACT
Popular vote	2,567	968
Percentage	12.26%	4.62%
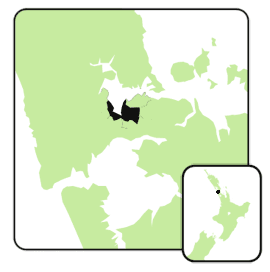
Member before election
Helen Clark
Labour
Elected Member
David Shearer
Labour

The 2009 Mount Albert by-election was held in the New Zealand electorate of Mount Albert on 13 June 2009. There were fifteen candidates in the election. David Shearer of the Labour Party won the election with 63% of the vote. The seat was vacated by former Labour Prime Minister Helen Clark, who resigned from the New Zealand Parliament on 17 April 2009 following her appointment to head the United Nations Development Programme. Main issues surrounding the campaign included the building of the Waterview Connection and the Auckland Region becoming a supercity.

== Background ==
The Mount Albert electorate is based around the neighbourhoods of western and central Auckland City. It includes the suburbs of Point Chevalier, Kingsland, Avondale, Waterview, as well as the eponymous Mount Albert. It has been held by the New Zealand Labour Party since its creation in 1946; Helen Clark was its representative from 1981 until 2009 and enjoyed a large majority in Mt Albert, winning 59% of the electorate vote in the 2008 election while Labour only won 42% of the party vote. Prior to the election, National had 58 seats in the House of Representatives, Labour had 42, Green had 9, ACT had 5, Māori had 5, Progressive had 1, and United Future had 1. Labour had lost one seat since the general election, as a result of the resignation of Clark, which caused the by-election.

== Key dates ==
The key dates for the by-election are as follows:

- Writ Day – Monday 11 May
- Nominations Open – Tuesday 12 May
- Nominations Day – Tuesday 19 May
- Advance Voting start – Wednesday 27 May
- Election – Saturday 13 June
- Official Results – Thursday 25 June
- Returns of Writs – Tuesday 30 June

== Results ==
2009 Mount Albert by-election
Notes: Blue background denotes the winner of the by-election. Pink background denotes a candidate elected from their party list prior to the by-election. Yellow background denotes the winner of the by-election, who was a list MP prior to the by-election. A ✓ or ✗ denotes status of any incumbent, win or lose respectively.
Party	Candidate	Votes	%	±%
Labour	David Shearer	13,260	63.49	+4.20
National	Melissa Lee^{a}	3,542	16.96	-11.88
Green	Russel Norman^{a}	2,567	12.29	+6.35
ACT	John Boscawen^{a}	968	4.63	+0.54
Bill and Ben	Ben Boyce	158	0.76	
Legalise Cannabis	Dakta Green	92	0.44	
Kiwi	Simonne Dyer	91	0.44	
United Future	Judy Turner	89	0.43	
Libertarianz	Julian Pistorius	39	0.19	
Independent	Jim Bagnell	24	0.11	
Independent	Ari Baker	15	0.07	
Human Rights Party	Anthony Van den Heuvel	13	0.06	
People Before Profit	Malcom France	13	0.06	
Independent	Jackson James Wood	9	0.04	
People's Choice	Rusty Kane	5	0.02	
Informal votes		58		
Total Valid votes		20,885		
Labour hold	Majority	9,718	46.40	+4.02

^{a} Three candidates were list MPs elected at the 2008 election.

== Candidates ==
There were fifteen candidates in total.

=== David Shearer (Labour) ===
Former UN Deputy Special Representative and 2002 candidate for Whangarei David Shearer won the Labour nomination from a field of eight candidates including lawyer Helen White and Auckland City councillor Glenda Fryer.

Shortly after his selection, media attention focused on articles he wrote for Foreign Affairs and World Today (in 1998 and 2001 respectively) arguing for the use and regulation of private military companies by Western governments for peacekeeping missions where they are unwilling to contribute troops. This was at odds with the position of Labour Party Leader and former Minister of Foreign Affairs Phil Goff.

National Party Leader and Prime Minister John Key said this was "a hypocritical position" because Labour claimed during 2008's election campaign that National had a secret privatisation agenda.

Media speculation prior to the selection suggested that the Labour Party nomination would go to then-current list MP Phil Twyford. Twyford announced that he would not seek the seat on 21 April. This followed media reports that the Labour Party was unwilling to allow Twyford's list place to be taken by defeated Auckland Central MP Judith Tizard.

=== Melissa Lee (National) ===
First-term list MP Melissa Lee beat 2008 candidate Ravi Masuku for the National Party nomination on 5 May.

Lee faced allegations that her production company Asia Vision had spent New Zealand on Air money making a promotional video for the National Party ahead of the 2008 election. Lee called the allegations "ridiculous", saying that all work on the video was done on a voluntary basis. New Zealand on Air investigated and cleared Lee of any misconduct. The Green Party complained to the Electoral Commission, saying that the video should have been declared as an election expense.

If Lee had won the by-election, the next (58th) person on the National Party list – Conway Powell – would have become a list MP, as Lee was already a list MP.

note: originally Cam Calder would have been the next list MP, but the day before the election (12 June) list MP Dr Richard Worth resigned from parliament over sexual allegations, so Calder became an MP regardless.

=== Russel Norman (Green) ===
Green Party co-leader Russel Norman was the only nomination from his party and was the first candidate from a party then in Parliament to declare his candidacy. In 2008, he stood in Rongotai, finishing third with 15.84% of the vote.

If Norman had won the by-election, the next (10th) person on the Green Party list – David Clendon – would have become a list MP, as Norman was already a list MP.

=== John Boscawen (ACT) ===
ACT selected list MP John Boscawen on 2 May. In the 2008 election, Boscawen ran in the seat of North Shore, coming fourth with 4% of the vote.

If Boscawen had won the by-election, the next (6th) person on the ACT list – Hilary Calvert – would have become a list MP, as Boscawen was already a list MP.

=== Judy Turner (United Future) ===
United Future party president and former MP (2002–2008) Judy Turner was announced as her party's candidate on 14 May. In 2008, Turner stood in the East Coast seat, coming fifth with 3.3 percent of the vote.

=== Other candidates ===
Ben Boyce

Ben Boyce is the second half of the comedy duo Bill and Ben. They stood on a "no policies, no promises, no disappointment" platform in 2008 and out-polled all other minor parties.

Simonne Dyer

Businesswoman Simonne Dyer was selected by The Kiwi Party on 4 May. In 2008 she was her party's candidate for Rodney, where she finished second to last with 1.55% of the vote.

Dakta Green

Former National Party chair of the Pakuranga electorate Dakta Green was selected as the Aotearoa Legalise Cannabis Party candidate on 2 May. Green had been arrested a number of times in the campaign for drugs offences. In response, Green has alleged police harassment and political interference in his campaign.

Julian Pistorius

Julian Pistorius was a 32-year-old computer programmer and former deputy leader of Libertarianz.

Jackson Wood

Jackson Wood was the then-editor of Victoria University student magazine Salient. He announced his independent candidacy on 21 April, being the first person to do so. He campaigned from Wellington, instead of Auckland, save for an open-invite slingshot battle on top of Mount Albert on 6 June, which he invited all other candidates to attend.

Malcolm France

Climaction coordinator. France's policies include:

- Civil disobedience against motorway
- No supercity
- $15 minimum wage.

France smeared a chocolate lamington cake on ACT candidate Boscawen in protest of the supercity.

Rusty Kane

Advocates binding citizens initiated referendums.

Anthony van den Heuvel

Van den Heuvel is of the Human Rights Party.

Jim Bagnall

Bagnall contested the election for the Union of Fathers.

Ari Baker

Independent candidate

== Campaign ==
=== Waterview Connection ===
A main issue in the campaign was the "Waterview Connection" – the connection of the Southwestern motorway at Mount Roskill with the Northwestern motorway at the suburb of Waterview, on the northern edge of the seat.

Transit New Zealand announced in 2008 (during the last year of the Fifth Labour Government) that its preferred option was for a two-lane tunnel costed at NZ$1.97 billion. The final cost of NZ$3.1 billion cited by the National Government included an expansion to a three-lane tunnel, upgrades to connecting roads and financing costs.

In May 2009, National's Transport Minister Steven Joyce announced that he was "not comfortable" with this cost, preferring a surface option costing NZ$1.1 billion. Although this option is over a billion dollars cheaper, the plan will require the demolition of 365 houses along the route in addition to the ones required for the tunnel option.

Labour called the option "second class" and that the decision was dismissive of the wishes of the people of Mount Albert. Green Party candidate Russel Norman described the plan as "better than the worst of all options", but added that the best anti-congestion investment would be public transport. National's candidate Melissa Lee backed the surface option, saying that the decision would bring certainty to the area. She also suggests that the tunnel option was "unaffordable". Meanwhile, Independent candidate Jackson Wood proposed a series of zeppelins to carry cars without the need for any construction.

Melissa Lee was widely criticised for claiming that the SH20 Waterview Connection would stop criminals from South Auckland committing crime in Mt Albert. Her party leader John Key called her comments "stupid" and Lee later apologised.

This happens..... people coming in from South Auckland get to Mount Albert, right?...and the thing it's like, hopefully, we could divert some of that traffic and criminals away from Mount Albert...

— Melissa Lee, TVNZ News

=== Auckland governance ===
The governance of the Auckland Region was another issue that was raised in the by-election campaign. The Royal Commission on Auckland Governance released its report at the end of March and the ruling National Party outlined its plans before campaigning began.

Labour did not support the current legislation relating to the supercity, and filibustered on the weekend of 15–18 May 2009, by proposing about 1000 amendments to the legislation, as the government was not sending it to the select committee process, and that a referendum was not being held for Aucklanders to decide whether a supercity was wanted.

== Debates ==
- Unitec
- Auckland University
- Plunket
- Public Service Association
- Combined Churches (Ecumenical Group) of Mt Albert
- Bfm
- NiuFM/531PI
- Radio Live

=== Q+A ===
David Shearer and Melissa Lee were interviewed by Paul Holmes on TVNZ's show on Sunday, 10 May. On Sunday, 7 June, Russel Norman and John Boscawen were interviewed on the show.

=== Back Benches ===
On Wednesday, 10 June, John Boscawen, Melissa Lee, Russel Norman, David Shearer and Judy Turner (the candidates from five main parties) appeared on the TVNZ show Back Benches. This episode was filmed and aired on 10 June, and was reshown on 12 June, on the channel TVNZ7.

== Polls ==
Party	Candidate	ONE News/Colmar Brunton–released 7 June	TV3/Reid–released 10 June
Labour	David Shearer	59%	61.7%
National	Melissa Lee	21%	20.6%
Green	Russel Norman	15%	13%
ACT	John Boscawen	3.3%	3.6%
Others		1.7%	1.1%
Sample		500	750
Margin of error		4.4%	3.6%

Shearer's huge majority meant that a low turnout was predicted, because voters may have felt that the result was inevitable. Actual turnout was 20,943, a 41% decrease on that of the 2008 general election.

== See also ==
- List of New Zealand by-elections
