= Judy Turner =

New Zealand politician

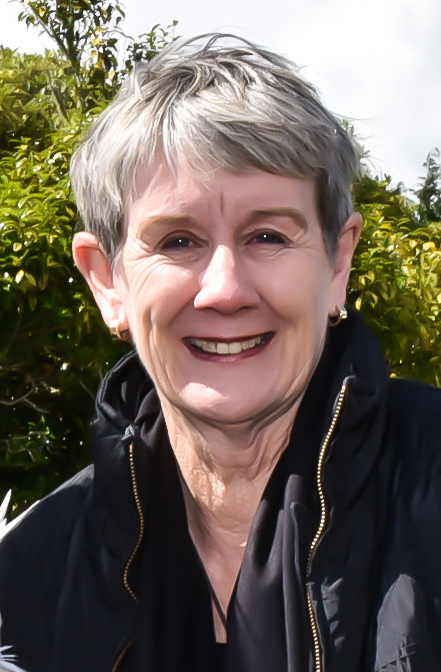
- Turner in 2019

Deputy Leader of United Future
- In office 2004 – 14 November 2017
- Leader: Peter Dunne; Damian Light
- Preceded by: Gordon Copeland

Member of the New Zealand Parliament for United Future list
- In office 2002–2008

9th Mayor of Whakatāne District
- In office 12 October 2019 – 14 October 2022
- Preceded by: Tony Bonne
- Succeeded by: Victor Luca

Personal details
- Born: Judith Anne Turner; 2 August 1956 (age 70)
- Party: United Future (until 2017)

Judith Anne Turner (born 2 August 1956) is a New Zealand politician who was the deputy leader of United Future New Zealand. She was a member of the New Zealand House of Representatives as a list MP from 2002 to 2008, and the mayor of Whakatāne from 2019 to 2022.

== Member of Parliament ==
New Zealand Parliament
Years	Term	Electorate	List	Party
2002–2005	47th	List	8	United Future
2005–2008	48th	List	2	United Future

Turner was first elected as a United Future list MP at the 2002 election.

In December 2004 United Future party members chose her as their deputy leader. In September 2005, Turner and Gordon Copeland became the only two United Future List MPs re-elected alongside Peter Dunne (who won an electorate seat). Although Copeland left the party in 2007, Turner indicated that she would remain within the United Future caucus.

In the 2008 election, Turner stood as a United Future candidate for the East Coast electorate. However, she failed to win the electorate, and United Future did not poll sufficiently well for a second list MP during the 2008 New Zealand general election. As a consequence, Turner did not return to Parliament.

In June 2009, Turner stood as an electorate candidate for United Future in Auckland's Mount Albert, polling eighth at 89 votes. She was outpolled by the Bill and Ben Party co-leader Ben Boyce (158 votes), as well as the Aotearoa Legalise Cannabis Party's Dakta Green (92 votes) and The Kiwi Party's Simmone Dyer (91 votes).

=== Former parliamentary roles ===
- Member, Business Committee
- Member, Finance and Expenditure Committee
- Member, Social Services Committee

=== UFNZ caucus roles ===
- Deputy Leader
- Member, Health select committee 27 August 2002 – 11 August 2005
- Spokesperson, Drugs 2002–2005
- Spokesperson, Family and Children 2002–2005
- Spokesperson, Senior Citizens 2002–2005
- Spokesperson, Social Services 2002–2005
- Spokesperson, Women's Affairs 2002–2005
- Spokesperson, Health 2005–2008
- Spokesperson, Education and Research 2005–2008
- Spokesperson, Family and Social Services 2005–2008
- Spokesperson, Māori and Treaty Issues 2005–2008

== Local political career ==
Turner was elected to Whakatāne District Council in the 2010 local elections and served three terms (i.e. until 2019) as deputy mayor. In the 2019 local elections, she won the mayoral election after the incumbent retired.

== Personal details ==
Born 2 August 1956, Turner is married with three adult children. Before entering politics, she worked simultaneously as an art teacher and as a pastoral and community worker at a local New Life Church.

Party political offices
Preceded by Anthony Walton	Deputy Leader of United Future; 2004–2017	Party dissolved
