= Aotearoa Legalise Cannabis Party =

New Zealand political party

- Abbreviation: ALCP
- Leader: Maki Herbert and Michael Appleby
- President: Christopher Manaia
- Secretary: Irinka Britnell
- Founded: December 1995
- Headquarters: 66 David St, Dunedin
- Ideology: Cannabis legalisation
- Colours: Green, black and white
- House of Representatives: 0 / 120

Website
- alcp.org.nz

Aotearoa Legalise Cannabis Party (ALCP), also known as the Cannabis Party, is a political party in New Zealand. It is dedicated to the legalisation of cannabis for medical, recreational and industrial use. It was founded in 1996 and has stood in every general election since, but has never won representation in Parliament. Several of its members have gone on to political success after leaving the party.

== Background ==
Cannabis is the most widely used illegal drug in New Zealand. Its use today is regulated by the Misuse of Drugs Act 1975, which classes it as either a Class B drug ("Very high risk of harm") or a Class C drug ("moderate risk of harm"), depending on the product or substance. In December 2018, the Misuse of Drugs act was amended allowing for much broader use of medical marijuana, making the drug available to terminally ill patients in the last 12 months of life.

Also in December 2018, the Government announced a non-binding referendum on cannabis for personal use, to be held as part of the 2020 general election, though the final result was against legalisation.

=== Early cannabis parties and precursors ===
There were various pro-cannabis parties or candidates before the Aotearoa Legalise Cannabis Party was founded. The New Zealand Marijuana Party was founded in 1978 and was led by Ashley Grant Bedford. The party announced that they would put forward five candidates in the 1978 election, however, the party only stood one candidate; V. Gavriel in Western Hutt. Bedford later contested the 1993 Tauranga by-election as an 'independent HEMP' candidate.

Michael Finlayson, who would later be the ALCP's spokesman upon its foundation and deputy leader for the 1996 election contested Auckland Central in the 1990 election under the Legalise Marijuana Party banner. The party also stood a candidate, K. Dreaver, in Invercargill.

In the 1994 Selwyn by-election, a candidate, Warren Bryson, stood under the banner of NORML New Zealand, a cannabis law reform organisation.

== History ==
=== 1990s ===
The Aotearoa Legalise Cannabis Party was founded in December 1995, with it being registered by the Electoral Commission on 30 May 1996. In the 1996 election, the party fielded four electorate candidates and stood 19 candidates on the party list, obtaining 1.66% of the party vote; this remains the ALCP's best result today. The party did not win any seats.

The ALCP stood their leader, Michael Appleby, in the 1998 Taranaki-King Country by-election. Appleby received 393 votes, coming eighth out of 20 candidates.

In the 1999 election, the party fielded 11 electorate candidates and stood 17 candidates on the party list, receiving 1.10% of the party vote. The party did not win any seats.

=== 2000s ===
The party contested the 2002 election with seven electorate candidates and a party list of 12, winning 0.64% of the vote; a result that was not enough for the ALCP to secure a seat in Parliament.

The ALCP nominated activist Dun Mihaka for the 2004 Te Tai Hauauru by-election, who subsequently received 197 votes, a distant second to the winner Tariana Turia, who received 7,256. In the 2005 election, the party put forward a party list of 13 and nominated 6 electorate candidates, ultimately winning no electorates and receiving 0.25% of the vote.

In 2008, the party invited outgoing Dunedin South MP David Benson-Pope to join the ALCP, but he declined, saying, "Their judgement has obviously been impaired by their recreational habits". The ALCP fielded eight electorate candidates and 20 on the party list in the 2008 election, winning 0.41% of the vote.

In the 2009 Mount Albert by-election, the party stood activist Dakta Green, who ultimately received 92 votes, coming sixth out of 15 candidates. In the 2010 Mana by-election, the ALCP put forward Julian Crawford as its candidate. Crawford came sixth out of eight candidates with 112 votes. The ALCP selected Leo Biggs for the 2011 Botany by-election, who came sixth out of 10 candidates with 61 votes, and Maki Herbert for the 2011 Te Tai Tokerau by-election, who placed fourth out of six candidates with 135 votes.

=== 2010s ===
In the 2011 election, the party received 0.52% of the party vote after standing 17 electorate and 28 list candidates. In June 2013, the 2013 Ikaroa-Rāwhiti by-election was held, which was contested by ALCP leader Michael Appleby. Appleby finished fourth out of six candidates with 176 votes. In October 2013, Appleby, who had led the party from 1996, stood down and was replaced by Dunedin journalist Julian Crawford. In November, the 2013 Christchurch East by-election was held, in which the ALCP put forward Paula Lambert as their candidate. Lambert received 59 votes, coming sixth out of 10 candidates.

In the 2014 election, the party fielded 10 electorate candidates and 13 on the party list. The ALCP received 0.46% of the vote. In the 2015 Northland by-election, the ALCP nominated Maki Herbert, who subsequently received 94 votes and came fifth out of 11 candidates. The party stood Brandon Stronge as their candidate in the 2016 Mount Roskill by-election. Stronge came fifth out of seven candidates after getting 84 votes. In the 2017 Mount Albert by-election, the party put forward cannabis activist Abe Gray as its candidate. Gray won 97 votes, coming seventh out of 13 candidates.

By April 2017, Alastair Gregory was noted as being leader of the party. In June, the party president, Abe Gray, resigned from the party and defected to the Opportunities Party. Also in June, an updated ALCP leadership team was announced, with Jeff Lye as the new leader and Maki Herbert as his deputy. However, by September, Herbert was noted as a co-leader alongside Lye.

The ALCP unsuccessfully contested the 2017 election, standing six electorate candidates and 14 on the party list. The party received 0.31% of the vote and won no seats in Parliament. By May 2018, Michael Appleby was noted as having returned to the leadership of the party, replacing Jeff Lye as co-leader. The party stood Lye as its candidate for the 2018 Northcote by-election. Lye received 89 votes, coming sixth out of eight candidates.

=== 2020s ===
In the 2020 election, the ALCP fielded nine electorate and 12 list candidates, ultimately winning 0.46% of the party vote. At the same time as the election, a cannabis referendum was held, which would have seen the legalisation of recreational cannabis if passed through the proposed "Cannabis Legalisation and Control Bill". The ALCP registered as a third party promoter for supporting the bill. The referendum failed, with 50.7% opposing the proposed bill compared to 48.4% supporting it.

The party nominated Christopher Coker as its candidate for the 2022 Tauranga by-election. Coker received 117 votes, coming seventh out of 12 candidates. The ALCP also stood recent Christchurch Mayoral candidate, pilot, and non-cannabis user Peter Wakeman for the 2022 Hamilton West by-election. Wakeman came eighth out of 12 candidates after getting 76 votes.

In the 2023 election, the ALCP nominated 14 electorate candidates and 16 on the party list, ultimately winning 0.46% of the party vote.

As of 2026, the ALCP is co-led by Maki Herbert and Michael Appleby, with Christopher Manaia as its president. During the 2026 election, the party put forward a party list of 12 and nominated 10 electorate candidates. Based on preliminary results, the ALCP won 0.19% of the party vote and no seats.

== Policies ==
The ALCP's policies all relate to cannabis, hemp, or drug education. These include legalising possession, growing and use of cannabis for those over 18, creating a 'medpot' card, taxing companies involved in the cannabis industry, removing the need for a licence to grow hemp, and funding drug education and research.

== Members' success outside of ALCP ==
Two ALCP candidates went on to become Members of Parliament for the Green Party. Nándor Tánczos and Metiria Turei were both ALCP list candidates in 1996; Tánczos became a Green MP in 1999 and Turei became a Green MP in 2002. Another ALCP candidate and, at one point, deputy leader, Tim Shadbolt, was elected mayor in two places; prior to running for ALCP in 1996 he was mayor of Waitemata from 1983 to 1989 and mayor of Invercargill from 1993 to 1995, and afterwards he became the mayor of Invercargill from 1998 until 2022.

Former president and deputy leader Abe Gray founded Whakamana Cannabis Museum, New Zealand's first and only cannabis museum, and has been a high-profile cannabis activist and protester for decades. Gray subsequently defected from the ALCP to join The Opportunities Party (TOP). TOP's policy on legalising cannabis has been praised by the president of NORML New Zealand, Chris Fowlie.

== Officeholders ==
=== List of leaders ===
No.	Name	Term of office		No.	Name	Term of office	
1	Michael Appleby	1996	14 October 2013				
2	Julian Crawford	14 October 2013	c. December 2016				
3	Alistair Gregory	fl.April 2017					
4	Jeff Lye	c. June 2017	c. May 2018	5	Maki Herbert	c. September 2017	present
(1)	Michael Appleby	c. May 2018	present	5	Maki Herbert	c. September 2017	present

=== List of deputy leaders ===
No.	Name	Term of office	Leader	
1	Mike Finlayson	1996–?	Appleby	
2	Tim Shadbolt	1997–1998	Appleby	
3	Blair Anderson	1998–1999	Appleby	
4	Allan Webb	1999–c. 2000	Appleby	
5	Jeanette Saxby	2000–c. 2002	Appleby	
6	Michael Britnell	c. 2002–2013	Appleby	
7	Abe Gray	2013–2014	Crawford	
8	Emma-Jane Kingi	2014–c. 2015	Crawford	
9	Alistair Gregory	fl.2016	Crawford	
10	Maki Herbert	2017	Lye	
11	Ritchard Boswell	fl.2019	Herbert	Appleby
12	Jeff Lye	c. 2020–present	Herbert	Appleby

== Electoral results ==
=== General elections ===
General Election	# of candidates nominated		# of seats won	# of party votes	% of party vote
General Election	Electorate	List	# of seats won	# of party votes	% of party vote
1996	4	19	0	34,398	1.66%
1999	11	17	0	22,687	▼1.10%
2002	7	12	0	12,987	▼0.64%
2005	6	13	0	5,748	▼0.25%
2008	8	20	0	9,515	▲0.41%
2011	17	28	0	11,738	▲0.52%
2014	10	13	0	10,961	▼0.46%
2017	6	14	0	8,075	▼0.31%
2020	9	12	0	13,329	▲0.46%
2023	14	16	0	13,025	0.46%
2026	10	12	0	TBD	▼

The ALCP has nominated candidates for electorate seats in each election since its foundation. No ALCP candidate has ever won a seat.

Their best general election result was in the 1996 election, where it won 1.66% of the party vote. It won 1.10% of the party vote in 1999, but since then the ALCP has not received more than 1% of the party vote in any election.

=== By-elections ===
By-election	Year	Candidate	# votes	% of vote	Placing	Result
Taranaki-King Country	1998	Michael Appleby	393	1.94%	8th	National hold
Te Tai Hauauru	2004	Dun Mihaka	197	2.52%	2nd	Māori Party gain
Mount Albert	2009	Dakta Green	92	0.44%	6th	Labour hold
Mana	2010	Julian Crawford	112	0.48%	6th	Labour hold
Botany	2011	Leo Biggs	61	0.40%	6th	National hold
Te Tai Tokerau	2011	Maki Herbert	135	1.10%	4th	Mana gain
Ikaroa-Rāwhiti	2013	Michael Appleby	176	1.57%	5th	Labour hold
Christchurch East	2013	Paula Lambert	59	0.43%	6th	Labour hold
Northland	2015	Maki Herbert	94	0.32%	5th	NZ First gain
Mount Roskill	2016	Brandon Stronge	84	0.48%	5th	Labour hold
Mount Albert	2017	Abe Gray	97	0.71%	7th	Labour hold
Northcote	2018	Jeff Lye	89	0.42%	6th	National hold
Tauranga	2022	Christopher Coker	117	0.56%	7th	National hold
Hamilton West	2022	Peter Wakeman	76	0.50%	8th	National gain

The ALCP has also contested many by-elections. Its most successful result was in the 2004 Te Tai Hauauru by-election. Only the Māori Party, the ALCP, and independents contested this by-election. The ALCP candidate, Dun Mihaka, finished second behind Māori Party leader Tariana Turia, receiving 197 votes (2.52%) to Turia's 7,256 (92.74%).

== See also ==
- Abe Gray
- Cannabis in New Zealand
- Cannabis political parties
- Drug policy reform
- Green Party of Aotearoa New Zealand
- 2020 New Zealand cannabis referendum
