= People's Choice Party =

- Leader: Rusty Kane
- Founded: 1999 by Doug Wilson and Rusty Kane
- Dissolved: 2002 (deregistered but remained active)

The People's Choice Party (also Peoples Choice Party or PCP) was a New Zealand political party. It was a registered party from 1999 to 2002, and its members have contested mayoral, local, and national elections since 1998.

== History ==
The People's Choice Party was formed in 1999 by Rusty Kane and Doug Wilson. Wilson had previously held a protest walk from New Plymouth to Wellington, during which he collected 52,000 signatures for a petition.

Wilson stood for the 1998 Taranaki-King Country by-election as a candidate for People's Choice. The People's Choice Party was officially registered before the 1999 election, which required at least 500 paid members. The party contested the 1999 general election to show opposition to the MMP voting system and received 387 party votes and a total of 154 electorate votes in two electorates. This included Kane standing in the Te Tai Hauāuru Maori electorate, the first non-Maori to stand in that seat.

The party was deregistered after Doug Wilson's retirement in 2002. However, it continued to act as an unregistered party and Rusty Kane remained active in politics. As of 2015, Kane had unsuccessfully stood in six national elections, run for the Stratford mayoralty, the Taranaki District Health Board, twice for a place on the Taranaki Regional Council, and once for the New Plymouth council. He also ran for Bay of Plenty Regional Council in 2016. He has frequently stood for electorates and local councils for areas he does not live and has been described as a "serial campaigner" and as "the man who runs more than a nose during winter". Kane has run sometimes under the People's Choice banner and sometimes as an independent; he also joined the Conservative Party but left in 2012 citing its 'anti-gay stance'.

Kane has described the party as a "ginger group, set up to advocate a political voice on behalf of small groups and individuals". Kane has stated that the party seeks to highlight issues, not to win seats. For example, the party stood in the 2009 Mt Albert by-election to support the binding of Citizens Initiated Referenda.

== Other uses of the name ==
In 2016, The People's Choice began to contest local body elections and won three counselor seats on the Canterbury Regional Council (Environment Canterbury). However, the group's website does not mention Kane, Wilson, or a history of past action and the group appears unconnected to Kane's party.
