= Diane Robertson =

New Zealand community leader

Dame Diane Robertson DNZM
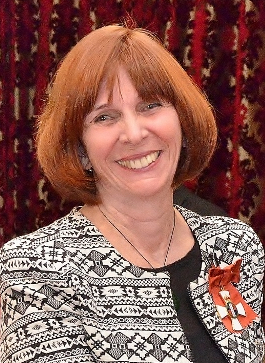
- Robertson in 2015
- Born: Diane Elizabeth Coburn; 11 May 1953 (age 73); Waipukurau, New Zealand
- Education: Tararua College; Palmerston North Teachers' College
- Occupation: Auckland City Missioner
- Spouse: Wilfred Holt (m. 1975)
- Children: Three

Dame Diane Elizabeth Robertson DNZM (née Coburn; born 11 May 1953) is a New Zealand community leader. She was the Auckland City Missioner from 1998 until 2015, and was the first woman to serve in the role.

== Biography ==
Robertson was born in Waipukurau in 1953, the daughter of Joan Lois Coburn and her husband Alexander Lawrence Coburn. She was educated at Tararua College, and then studied at Palmerston North Teachers' College where she gained a Diploma of Teaching. She met her husband, Wilfred Holt, when she was teaching at Waiouru Military Camp and he was serving in the army, and they married in 1975. They would go on to have three children.

In 1998, Robertson was appointed the Auckland City Missioner, having previously been a teacher, counsellor and involved in youth work and a manager of a social services agency. She was the first woman and first non-cleric to hold the role. During her tenure, she designed the Family 100 Research project, which collected and collated information about one hundred families living in poverty over the course of a year. This resulted in the Speaking for Ourselves report, published in July 2014, which highlighted the complex challenges such families face. Robertson also worked with Statistics New Zealand to improve availability of data about people living in poverty through the inclusion of Auckland City Mission data in their data infrastructure.

In September 2015 she announced that she would step down from that post at the end of 2015.

Robertson is executive director of the New Zealand Data Trust, chair of the Goodman Fielder Cares Foundation, and a member of the Vulnerable Children's Board.

== Honours ==
Robertson was awarded the New Zealand 1990 Commemoration Medal in 1990. In the 2015 Queen's Birthday Honours, she was appointed a Dame Companion of the New Zealand Order of Merit, for services to the community.

Robertson is a Paul Harris Fellow.
