= Foundation for a Drug-Free World =

Scientology-affiliated anti-drug organization

- Founded: October 2006
- Type: Non-profit (religious)
- Tax ID no.: 20-5812172
- Purpose: Drug abuse prevention
- Location: 6331 Hollywood Blvd, Suite 710, Los Angeles, California, United States
- Region served: Worldwide
- Method: Anti-drug booklets, public service announcements, drug awareness events
- Key people: Ambra Calzolari; Jessica Hochman; Gail Carroll; Aris Gregorian; Maurithus Meiring; Shaleen Wohrnitz
- Parent organization: Church of Scientology
- Website: www.drugfreeworld.org

Foundation for a Drug-Free World (FDFW) is a nonprofit organization operated by the Church of Scientology with a focus on the elimination of drug and alcohol abuse and its resulting criminality. It was established in October 2006 in Los Angeles, California. There has been controversy about the claims made by FDFW and about its support by public organizations who were not aware of its link to Scientology.

FDFW uses the self-produced Truth About Drugs campaign materials for drug education and has been described as "discredited pseudoscience" and "not accurate" by health care professionals. The program has been accused of scaremongering by health care professionals, for claims such as cocaine withdrawal can cause severe depression which can lead to the addict committing murder.

== Relation to Scientology and Narconon ==
In 2012, the Santa Ana Police Department distributed anti-drug pamphlets provided by FDFW. A reporter called the contact number on the pamphlets and asked where to get help for drug abuse. He was directed to Narconon Arrowhead, the flagship rehab center of Narconon International, which is classified as a Scientology related entity by the Internal Revenue Service. The SAPD withdrew the pamphlets after the reported link.

The "Drug-Free Marshal" program started in November 2008, at Las Cruces, New Mexico. Foundation for a Drug-Free World supplied the pamphlets, at the bottom of which contained a notice of copyright by Foundation for a Drug-Free World, Narconon and Association for Better Living and Education, all programs sponsored by the Church of Scientology. After the city mayor found out that the anti-drug program was created and bankrolled by the Church of Scientology, he apologized and ended the program.

After an investigation by the State of California into the Narconon anti-drug education program, State Superintendent Jack O'Connell urged all California schools to drop the program for its inaccurate and unscientific information in 2005, the year before Foundation for a Drug-Free World was founded.

In 2017 in Santa Monica High School after a pupil's LSD related death, FDFW presented seminars to pupils in the school. But when made aware of the connection to the Church of Scientology, a number of parents complained and the program was halted. The church responded publicly in a press statement and accused Santa Monica High School of bigotry and religious discrimination.
