= Misuse of Drugs (Medicinal Cannabis) Amendment Act 2018 =

Act of Parliament in New Zealand

New Zealand Parliament
- Passed: 11 December 2018
- Royal assent: 17 December 2018
- Commenced: 18 December 2018
- Introduced by: David Clark
- Status: Current legislation

The Misuse of Drugs (Medicinal Cannabis) Amendment Act 2018 (2018 No 54) is an Act of Parliament in New Zealand which amends the Misuse of Drugs Act 1975 to allow terminally-ill people to consume cannabis and to possess a cannabis utensil. The bill passed its third reading on 11 December 2018. It was supported by the centre-left Labour Party and its coalition partners New Zealand First and the Green parties but was opposed by the opposition centre-right National Party. The Act received royal assent on 17 December and came into force on 18 December 2018.

== Legislative features ==
The Misuse of Drugs (Medicinal Cannabis) Amendment Act amends the Misuse of Drugs Act 1975 to:

- introduce an exception and a statutory defence for those requiring palliative care to possess and use illicit cannabis and to possess a cannabis utensil;
- provide a regulation-making power to enable the setting of standards that products manufactured, imported, and supplied under licence must meet; and
- amend Schedule 2 of the Act so that cannabidiol (CBD) and CBD products are no longer classed as controlled drugs.

This Act intends to improve access to both medicinal cannabis and medicinal cannabis products of a quality standard. Cannabis compounds that are still classified as controlled drugs are tetrahydrocannabinols and related psychoactive substances.

Both the populist New Zealand First and the left-wing Green Party secured concessions to the Amendment Act including the inclusion of anyone in palliative care rather than those defined as terminally ill and the establishment of a regulated local market that allows native strains of cannabis rather than imported cannabis products. The Minister of Health David Clark has also confirmed that medicinal cannabis products will be available on prescription.

However, no individual may leave or enter New Zealand with illicit cannabis even if they have been diagnosed by a medical or nurse practitioner as requiring palliation. Individuals can still travel with one month's supply of medicines that are controlled drugs such as Sativex or three months' supply of medicines that are not controlled drugs (CBD products) provided they are able to show that the drugs have been lawfully supplied to them.

== History ==
=== Introduction ===
The Misuse of Drugs (Medicinal Cannabis) Amendment Bill was first introduced on 30 January 2018 by Health Minister David Clark. It passed its first reading and was referred to the parliamentary Health Committee. At that stage, the Bill was supported by both the Labour-led coalition government and the opposition centre-right National Party. This Bill is not to be confused with Green MP Chlöe Swarbrick's similarly named Misuse of Drugs (Medical Cannabis and Other Matters) Amendment Bill, which did not pass its first reading on 31 January.

=== Health Committee report ===
On 24 July 2018, the National Party withdrew its support for the Government's Bill and proposed its own an alternative bill which it claimed would set out a more comprehensive and well-researched regime regulating medicinal cannabis. National MP Shane Reti's bill proposed allowing medicinal cannabis products with the exception of loose leaf cannabis to be regulated the same way as medicine, classifying medicinal cannabis as pharmacist–only medicine, and giving doctors the right to issue identification cards that would allow patients to purchase medicinal cannabis. Health Minister Clark opposed the bill, claiming National was playing politics.

On 25 July, the parliamentary Health Committee released its report to Parliament. Since the Committee was unable to reach an agreement on the Bill, it was unable to recommend the passage of the bill. The Health Committee received 1,786 written submissions on the bill with the vast majority expressing support for legalising medicinal cannabis. Only 1% opposed the intents of the bill. The Health Committee also heard 158 oral submissions, which were largely supportive of the bill. Submitters' concerns included expanding access to those with other medical conditions, the regulation of medicinal cannabis products, lack of a clear definition of terminal illnesses, and calls for a full risk assessment of cannabidioil.

The Ministry of Health also recommended several amendments included providing a legal defence for the terminally ill to possess cannabis; setting regulations to prescribe standards for all stages of cultivation, production, and manufacture of cannabis; to allow the Director-General of Health to communicate information about the availability of medicinal cannabis products; maintaining a prohibition on tetrahydrocannabinols capable of inducing a psychoactive effect on individuals, and allowing CBD products to contain some non-psychoactive cannabinoids that are naturally found in cannabis. The Labour Party expressed support for the bill as a means of decriminalizing medicinal cannabis. While the National Party supported making medicinal cannabis more easily accessible, it expressed concerns about the wording of the bill and the manufacture, distribution, and eligibility of medicinal cannabis products.

The cannabis law reform organization NORML New Zealand issued a submission voicing support for descheduling CBD products but allowing a wider 5% tolerance for other cannaboids to improve production and affordability; broadening the defence to include patients with terminal illnesses, chronic or debilitating medical conditions where the doctor has prescribed the use of cannabis; allowing the cultivation of cannabis; and taking a herbal remedy approach towards non-pharmaceutical cannabis products. While supportive of the Government's proposed Medicinal Cannabis Access Scheme, it advocated a "patient-focused regime" that allowed local cultivation as opposed to what it termed a "corporate pharmaceutical-style scheme."

=== Second Reading ===
Following the Health Committee's report, the Bill passed its second reading on 29 November 2018. The Bill was supported by the ruling coalition parties and National, which had reversed its previous opposition on the condition that some of its own legislation including those pertaining to banning of smoking "loose-leaf" cannabis be incorporated into the final bill. During its second reading, the revised Bill incorporated several changes including extending the use of medicinal cannabis to all needing palliative care; require that regulations for a Medicinal Cannabis Scheme be set up within a year after the law comes into effect; permit the use of cannabis varieties already available in New Zealand to be used for medicinal products; and revising THC thresholds for CBD medicinal products.

The Bill was subsequently referred to the Committee of the whole House on 5 December 2018.

=== Third reading ===
On 11 December, the Misuse of Drugs (Medicinal Cannabis) Bill passed its third reading. The bill was supported by Labour, New Zealand First and the Greens (63) but opposed by National (53). NZ First health spokesperson Jenny Marcroft praised the inclusion of anyone in palliative care under the bill as a compassionate approach that would provide 25,000 people with a defence for using medicinal cannabis. Greens drug reform spokesperson Chloe Swarbrick said the bill would allow the development of a domestic market for regulated cannabis products. Health Minister and bill initiator David Clark stated that the bill would allow medicinal cannabis to be made available on prescription.

By contrast, National claim that the bill amounted to the decriminalisation of cannabis by stealth, "We support medicinal cannabis but strongly oppose the smoking of loose leaf cannabis in public. Smoked loose leaf is not a medicine" said spokesman Shane Reti.

=== Royal Assent ===
On 17 December, the act received royal assent and commenced the following day.

== Referendum on recreational consumption of cannabis ==
Also on 18 December, the Government announced that a nationwide, binding referendum on recreational consumption of cannabis would be held as part of the 2020 general election.
