= Kate Hawkesby =

New Zealand broadcaster

Kate Hawkesby (born 1 April 1973) is a New Zealand radio announcer and television presenter who previously hosted 'Early Edition' (weekdays from 5am) for Newstalk ZB. While working as a reporter, presenter and news reader for TVNZ between 1995 and 2007 she became the youngest person to present a One News at 6 bulletin.

== Career ==
She has worked extensively as a reporter in the field, from reporting live from the Oscars in LA, to flying with the NZ Army in an RNZAF Hercules to Papua New Guinea to report on trouble in Bougainville as it edged towards civil war.

Kate Hawkesby began presenting on TV2 Headline News, then fronted the Breakfast and Midday news, job sharing with Simon Dallow.

In 2002, she became the co-anchor of TV One's Breakfast show with Mike Hosking. Highlights included co-hosting a week-long "road show" of live programmes around the country, and covering the America's Cup races live, as well as interviewing a wide range of newsmakers and politicians.

In 2004, Hawkesby joined Eric Young as host of the late news show Tonight, which she fronted on her own for two years after Young left. She left on maternity leave in late 2006 and has since announced she will not return.

She hosted an impromptu three-hour live breaking news special as Chechen rebels seized a school in Beslan, Russia, and held hundreds of children hostage.

As well as presenting Tonight, Hawkesby has interviewed a range of musicians from Brooke Fraser to Bryan Ferry for the show. She had the only exclusive TV interview with Olympic boxer Soulan Pownceby who was convicted of manslaughter. Hawkesby was also a regular fill-in on One News.

On top of her newsreading duties, Hawkesby has also hosted a raft of TV specials for TV One, including The Lord of the Rings' premiere in Wellington, the World of Wearable Art Awards, and the Young Musician of the Year Awards.

She also hosted the launch of Fashion Week in 2004. Offscreen Hawkesby works as an MC for many corporations and charities, supporting the Starship Foundation, Child Cancer, and the Breast Cancer Research Trust. She also took part in this year's Make Poverty History Campaign.

Hawkesby has been a finalist in the Qantas Television Awards Best Presenter category six times, and was a finalist in the People's Choice Award for Best Female TV Personality 2005.

She also hosted TV ONEs How Normal Are You? in 2005.

== Personal life ==
Hawkesby has a Political Studies degree, and worked overseas on London's Daily Express newspaper before returning to New Zealand to get married. Her marriage to Richard Lyne ended in 2007 after twelve years; they have three children. Her second marriage is with Mike Hosking; he has two children from his previous marriage.

== See also ==
- List of New Zealand television personalities
