= Muriel Newman =

New Zealand politician

Member of the New Zealand Parliament for ACT party list
- In office 12 October 1996 – 17 September 2005

Personal details
- Born: 6 April 1950 (age 75) England
- Party: ACT
- Spouse: Frank Newman

Muriel Newman (born 6 April 1950) is a former New Zealand politician for the ACT New Zealand party. She was a member of the New Zealand Parliament from 1996 until 2005, when she was not re-elected.

== Early years ==
Newman was born in northern England. She arrived in New Zealand at the age of eight and was raised in Whangārei. She gained a BSc in mathematics from the University of Auckland, and then a Ph.D. in mathematics education from Rutgers University in the United States. After working in the education sector for twenty years, she entered the business world with Michael Hill International, eventually becoming the deputy general manager of the New Zealand operation before being elected to Parliament. She has been a president of the Northland Chamber of Commerce, a member of the Northland Health Board, and member of the Northland Conservation Board.

She is married to Frank Newman, an accountant and former member of the Whangarei District Council.

== Member of Parliament ==
New Zealand Parliament
| Years | Term | Electorate | List | Party |
|---|---|---|---|---|
| 1996–1999 | 45th | List | 8 | ACT |
| 1999–2002 | 46th | List | 7 | ACT |
| 2002–2005 | 47th | List | 3 | ACT |

Newman was a founding member of the ACT New Zealand party. She was one of its candidates in the 1996 general election, the first election the party contested, and was elected to Parliament as one of ACT's eight list MPs. She was re-elected in 1999 and 2002 and was party whip.

In 2004, when Richard Prebble stepped down as ACT's leader, Newman stood as a candidate to succeed him; she lost to Rodney Hide, but emerged with the role of deputy leader. She was placed third on ACT's party list in the 2005 election, but lost her seat in Parliament, as ACT's representation was reduced from nine MPs to only two.

== After Parliament ==
After leaving Parliament in 2005, Newman established the New Zealand Centre for Political Debate (since renamed the New Zealand Centre for Political Research), an independent public policy think tank.
