= Misuse of Drugs Act 1975 =

Act of Parliament in New Zealand

New Zealand Parliament
- Long title: An Act to consolidate and amend the Narcotics Act 1965 and to make further provision for the prevention of misuse of drugs

Legislative history
- Passed: 1975
- Status: Amended

The Misuse of Drugs Act 1975 is a New Zealand drug control law that classifies drugs into three classes, or schedules, purportedly based on their projected risk of serious harm. However, in reality, classification of drugs outside of passing laws (such as this one), where the restriction has no legal power, is performed by the governor-general in conjunction with the Minister of Health, neither of whom is actually bound by law to obey this restriction.

In December 2018 it was amended to permit terminally ill patients to use marijuana without risk of prosecution.

== Legislative history ==
The Misuse of Drugs Act was passed by the New Zealand Parliament into law in 1975.

On 11 December 2018, the Labour-led Coalition Government passed the Misuse of Drugs (Medicinal Cannabis) Amendment Act, which amended the existing law to permit terminally ill patients to use marijuana without risk of prosecution.

On 18 December 2018, the Government announced that it would also hold a referendum on legalizing recreational cannabis during the 2020 general election.

In March 2019, the Misuse of Drugs Amendment Bill was introduced. This added AMB-FUBINACA and 5F-ADB as Class A drugs; but most comment was around the phrase "affirm the existing discretion to prosecute", with lawyers and others saying that this would effectively mean an end to prosecution for mere possession of any drug. It was passed and became effective in August 2019.

In December 2020, the Act was amended by the Drug and Substance Checking Legislation Act 2020. This Act temporarily legalised drug checking in New Zealand. In November 2021, this change was made permanent by the Drug and Substance Checking Legislation Act 2021 making New Zealand the first nation to explicitly legalise drug checking.

In April 2024 the Act was amended by the Misuse of Drugs (Pseudoephedrine) Amendment Act 2024. This act reclassified pseudoephedrine as a Class C drug, allowing pharmacy sales.

== Legislative features ==
=== Class A ===
First Schedule: Very high risk of harm and illegal:

- Cocaine
- Crack Cocaine
- Heroin
- LSD
- Mescaline
- Methamphetamine
- Phencyclidine (PCP)
- Psilocin and psilocybin
- DMT

=== Class B ===
Second Schedule: Very high risk of harm and on prescription:

- Amphetamine
- Cannabis (hashish, cannabis oil, or other preparation)
- Ephedrine
- GHB,GBL, and 1,4-Butanediol
- Hydromorphone
- Hydrocodone
- MDMA (ecstasy)
- Methadone
- Methylphenidate
- Morphine
- Opium
- Oxycodone
- Pethidine
- Mephedrone

=== Class C ===
Third Schedule: Moderate risk of harm:

- Barbiturates^{1} (phenobarbital, barbital, etc.)
- Benzodiazepines^{2} (diazepam, alprazolam, lorazepam, nitrazepam, etc.)
- Benzylpiperazine (BZP)
- Cannabis (plant, leaf, fruit or seeds)
- Codeine
- Tramadol
- Zopiclone
- Ketamine
- Zolpidem
- Pseudoephedrine
- Piperazines
- Pyrovalerone
- Flakka

=== Psychoactive Substances Act Of 2013 ===
- Salvia Divinorum

^Note 1: Pentobarbital, secobarbital and amobarbital are subject to more legal restrictions and tougher penalties than are other Class C substances.

^Note 2: Temazepam and flunitrazepam are subject to more legal restrictions and tougher penalties than are other Class C substances.

=== Fourth Schedule ===
Precursor substances.

=== Conventions ===
The Expert Advisory Committee on Drugs (EACD) makes scheduling decisions, based on scientific and medical evidence and/or international treaty obligations. New Zealand is a party to the Single Convention on Narcotic Drugs, the Convention on Psychotropic Substances and the United Nations Convention Against Illicit Traffic in Narcotic Drugs and Psychotropic Substances.

National Drug Policy New Zealand notes, "The Conventions place certain obligations on signatory countries. When the UN classifies (or re-classifies) a substance under one of the above Conventions, it requires signatory countries to amend their domestic legislation to ensure consistency with the UN's amendment. Accordingly, the impetus for some of the drugs to be considered by the EACD will originate from decisions made at the UN".

== Amendments ==
In 2004, the New Zealand Parliament amended the Misuse of Drugs Act 1975 to reclassify cold and flu medicines containing pseudoephedrine as a controlled drug due to concerns that it was being used as a precursor drug in the production of methamphetamine.

In April 2024, the New Zealand Parliament passed new legislation amending the Misuse of Drugs Act 1975 to downgrade pseudoephedrine from a Class B to Class c controlled drug. This allowed 11 flu and cold medicines containing pseudoephedrine to be sold by registered pharmacists without requiring prescriptions.

== See also ==
- Alcohol in New Zealand
- Cannabis in New Zealand
- Presumption of supply in New Zealand
- Psychoactive Substances Act 2013
- Victimless crime
