= Karangahape Road =

Road in Auckland, New Zealand

- K' Road
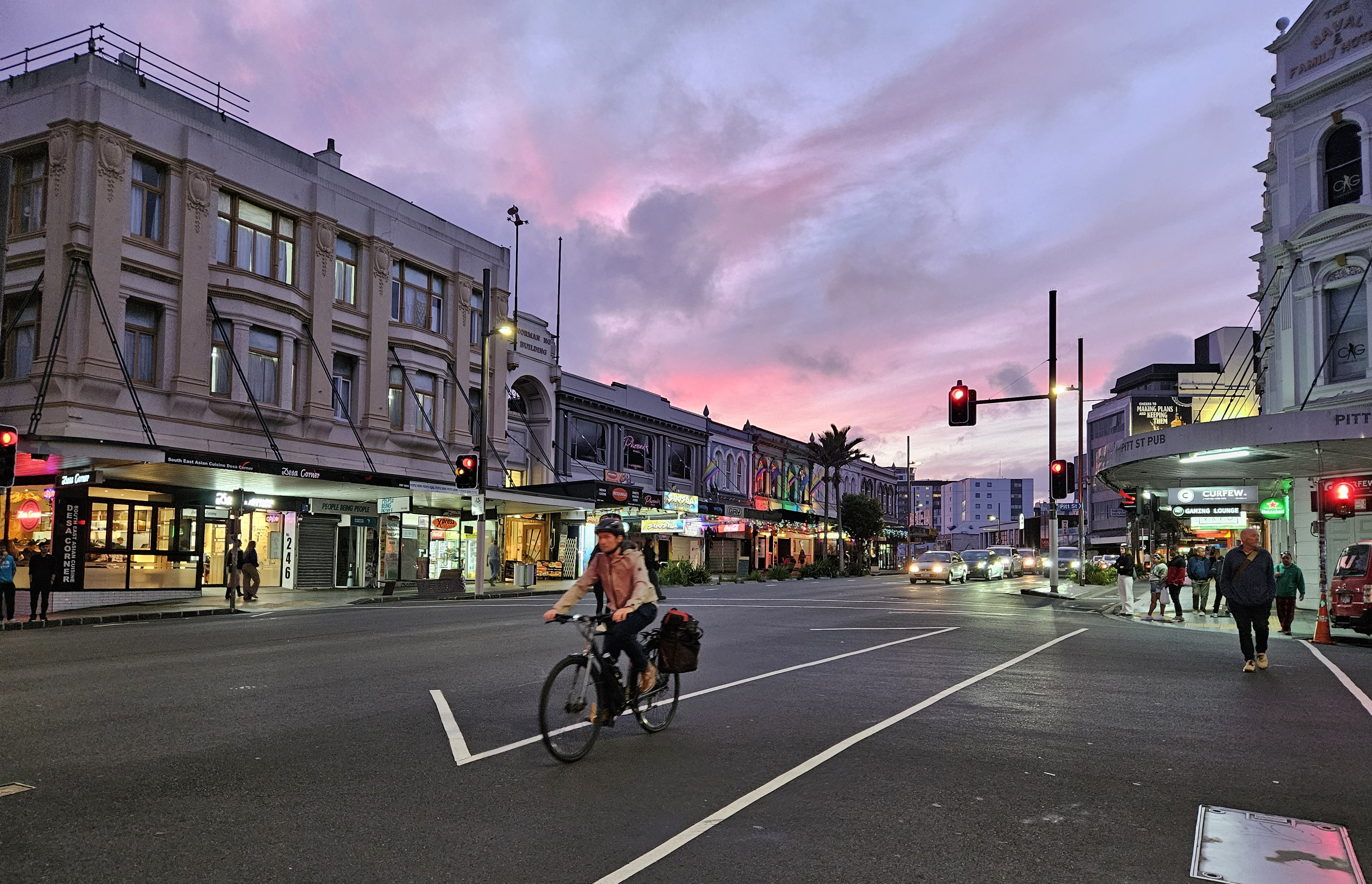
- Karangahape Road from the intersection with Pitt Street, showing the H B Building (left), Naval and Family Hotel (right) and Family Bar (centre background)
- Interactive map of Karangahape Road
- Length: 1 km (0.62 mi)
- Location: Auckland CBD, Auckland, New Zealand
- Coordinates: 36.8577935°S 174.7597039°E
- West end: Ponsonby Road, Great North Road, Newton Road
- East end: Symonds Street, Grafton Bridge

Karangahape Road (commonly known as K' Road) is one of the main streets in the central business district (CBD) of Auckland, New Zealand. The massive expansion of motorways through the nearby inner city area – and subsequent flight of residents and retail into the suburbs from the 1960s onwards – turned it from one of Auckland's premier shopping streets into a marginal area with the reputation of a red-light district. Now considered to be one of the cultural centres of Auckland, since the 1980s–1990s it has been undergoing a slow process of gentrification, and is now known for off-beat cafes and boutique shops.

It runs west–east along a ridge at the southern edge of the Auckland CBD, perpendicular to Queen Street, the city's main street. At its intersection with Ponsonby Road in the west, Karangahape Road becomes Great North Road, at its eastern end it connects to Grafton Bridge.

== Etymology ==
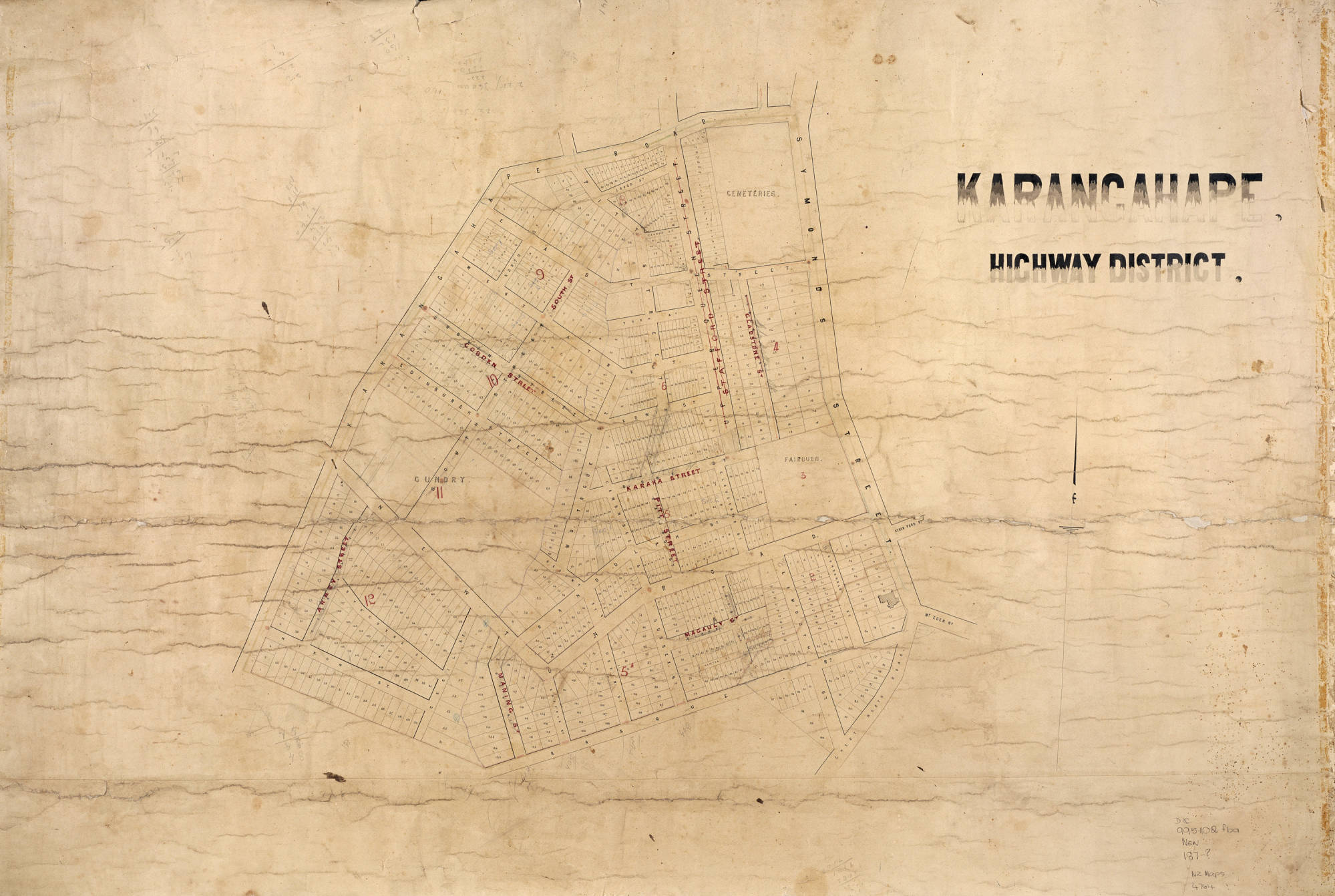
Karangahape Highway District c.1870

Karangahape is a word from the Māori language. Before Europeans appeared Auckland was occupied by several Māori iwi each of whom apparently used the same name for the Karangahape Ridge but with slightly different meanings.

The original meaning and origin of the word is uncertain; there are several interpretations – ranging from "winding ridge of human activity" to "calling on Hape". Hape was the tohunga (priest/navigator) of the Tainui migratory waka who lived around the Manukau Harbour. As the ridge was a walking route and was known as Te Ara o Karangahape – The Path of Karangahape – the name possibly indicates the route that was taken to visit him.

Until the mid 20th century Karangahape Road was the only street in central Auckland with a Māori name, undoubtedly due to its use as a thoroughfare in pre-European times. Its Māori name proved difficult for many European settlers to pronounce and as it was the only major thoroughfare in the central area demarcated as a "road" (as opposed to a street) during the 19th century it was apparently often referred to as "The Road".

In 1908 there was a movement to replace the long Māori name with something more urbane, European and modern. Although there were several public meetings and much discussion in the newspapers at the time, the city council was unmoved and the name survived. The topic re-emerged in 1913 but was again unsuccessful, probably because of the advent of the First World War. Just before the Royal Tour in 1953 there was another push to rename the road; this time as "Elizabeth Street" but again the original name survived. From the early 20th century it has become widely known as "K Road", even outside of Auckland.

== History ==
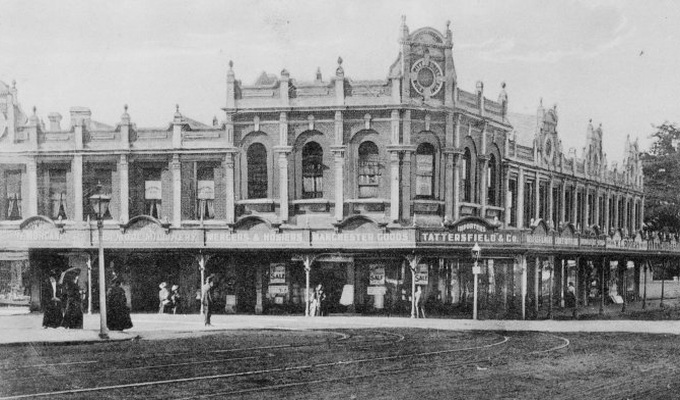
Corner Pitt Street and Karangahape Road in 1909, showing the rich architecture typical of many historic retail buildings constructed on the ridge street.

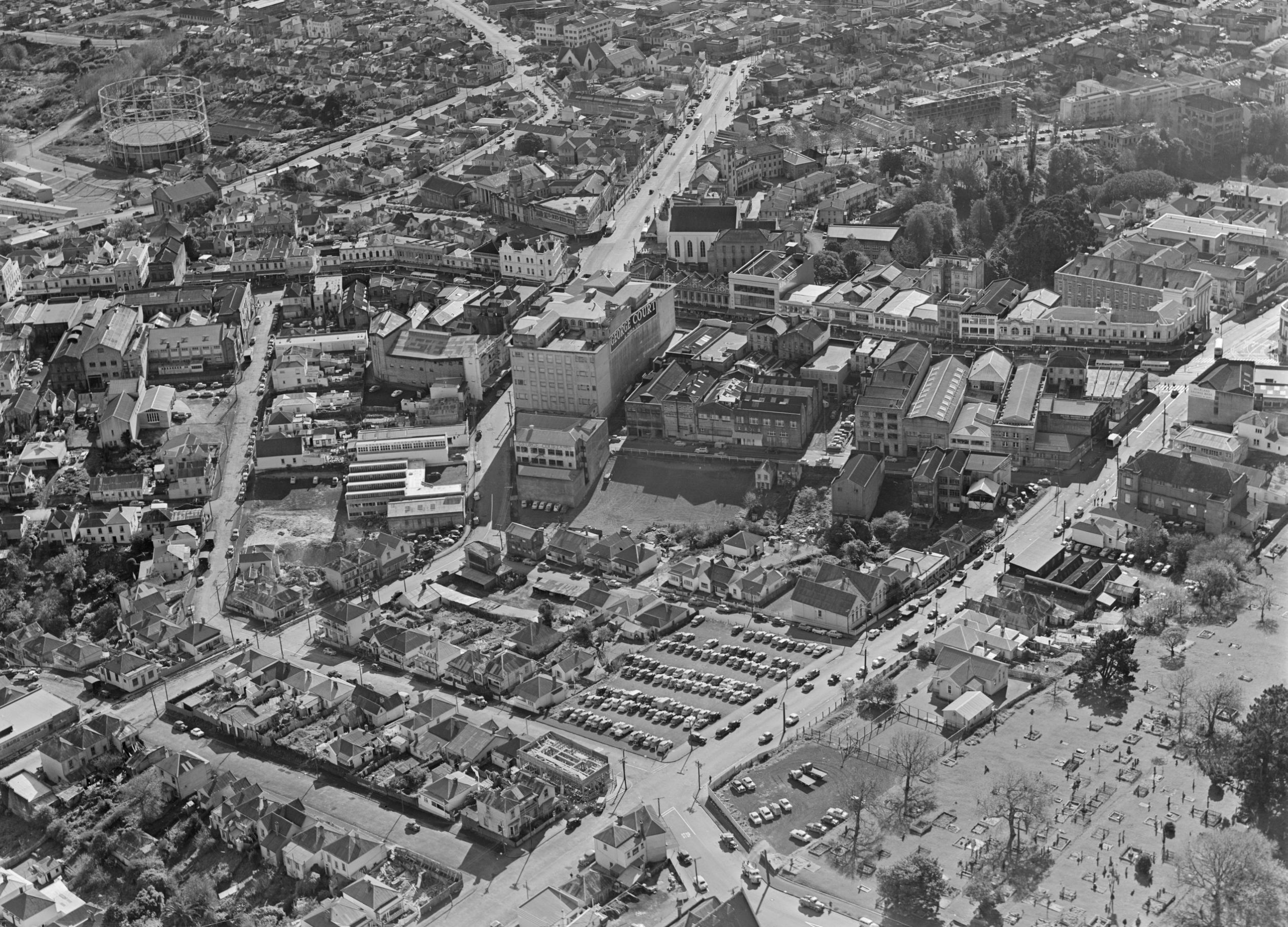
K'Road in 1957, a healthy main street with department stores and many other shops – before the motorways destroyed or degraded much of the surrounding residential areas, starting several decades of decline.

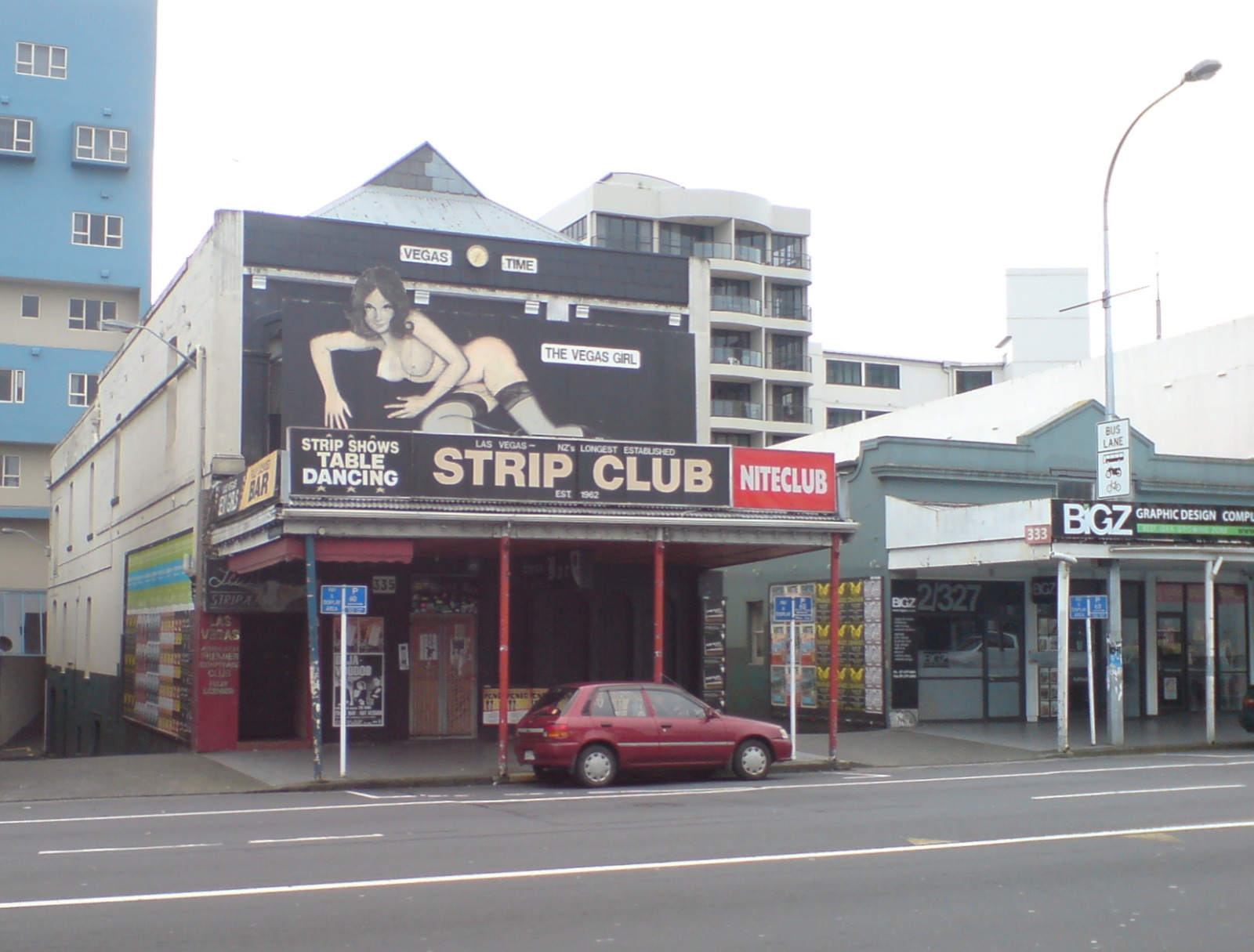
The western portion of the street became run-down and turned into the city's red-light district. The main part of the street remained a shopping hub but in the mind of the general public the reputation of the street as a whole became very disreputable. Now only a small number of obvious remnants of that time, such as the 'Vegas Girl' of the 'Las Vegas' strip club, still exist today.

As it was a travel route used by the pre-European Māori, Karangahape Road is an older thoroughfare than Queen Street, which was only developed by Europeans in the 1840s. The land was part of the parcel of 3000 acres sold by a local Māori to the government in 1841. The Karangahape ridge was the formal southern edge of Auckland City in the 19th century. The Karangahape Road District was formed 5 October 1868 and started operation 2 November 1869. In 1882 the road district amalgamated with the City of Auckland.

From about 1900 to the early 1960s, K' Road was Auckland's busiest shopping street with a large range of clothing and shoe shops and several department stores. Most retail chain stores had branches here, often in preference to Queen Street. During the interwar period most of Auckland's main shops selling furniture, musical instruments, radios and household appliances were located here.

In 1908 the gas street lighting was replaced with electric lamps. In 1935 the whole street was lit by electric lights under the shop awnings to create a "Community Lighting" project, referred to as the "Great White Way". First activated by Mayor Sir Ernest Davis, the chain lit up a mile of shop fronts which added to the glamour of late night shopping. In 1948 the second set of traffic lights in Auckland (and the first lights to have pedestrian phases) were installed at the Pitt Street intersection. In 1949 the street lamps were fitted with the first fluorescent street lights in New Zealand.

The Karangahape Road Business Association (KBA) had begun in 1911 as an informal gathering of businesspeople in the area. It officially dates from 1924 when it was registered as the Karangahape Road Businessmen's Association. Its first president was Mathew James Bennett, who ran a paint, wallpaper and interior decorating firm. Bennett was involved in a number of organisations including the Auckland Electric Power Board.

On 15 April 1932 the Queen Street unemployment riot of the night before, extended to Karangahape Road, with 43 shops having their windows broken.

During the middle of the 20th century the Karangahape Road Area was a destination shopping centre, especially busy at night with family groups travelling in (often on public transport) and traversing the district. A line was painted down the centre of the footpaths to regulate foot traffic, and police were posted at the Pitt Street intersection to stop people being pushed out into traffic. A typical late-night outing included seeing a movie, shopping, a meal, and walking along the street window shopping. At this time the street had five cinemas (The Avon, Vogue, Newton Palace, Playhouse and Tivoli) and probably as many dance halls (The Music Academy, Peter Pan Cabaret), including the Druid's Hall in Galatos Street which is still in operation as a music venue (Galatos).

K Road was the location of many shops aimed at the beauty and fashion trade; fabric, clothing, shoes, accessories and many specialist hair and beauty salons (Kay's Beauty Salon, Winter's Hair Dressing, Miss Hubber, The Powder Puff Salon). There were several photographers' studios located along the ridge since the late Victorian period (Ellerbeck, Andrews, Morton's, Partington, Tadema, Sarony, St John Biggs, Peter Pan Studios). In addition to a collection of some fairly upmarket dress emporiums (Flacksons, LaGonda) and furriers, there were a number of establishments which specialised in bridal fashions and accessories (Tadema Studios was just one of the photographers which specialised in Wedding photography).

As shops were not open on Saturdays or Sundays before the 1980s, the inner city was rather quiet during the day on the weekends. Karangahape Road was an exception, however. Most weddings take place on a Saturday and groups of women would loiter on K Road outside the many photographers' studios to catch a glimpse of wedding parties as they arrived or departed from having their studio portraits taken. Sundays were a social event as well; up until the 1960s people regularly attended church in the area.

The Karangahape Road area was the location of several major places of worship; The Baptist Tabernacle, The Pitt St Methodist Church, St James' Wellington Street, Congregationalist, St Benedicts, The Church of Christ Scientist, The Church of Christ, The Church of the Epiphany, Church of Jesus, The Church of Jesus Christ of Latter-day Saints, Chinese Presbyterian Church, the Salvation Army, Pacific Island Church, two Brethren Halls and after 1968, the Auckland Hebrew Congregation's main campus. There was also the Higher Thought Temple, The Theosophical Society, The Foresters Hall, The Druids Hall, The Scots Hall, The Hibernian Society, The Irish Hall, three Freemasons Halls, several Trade Unions, the Maori Hall and the Old Folks Association. Any of these organisations were likely to be the location of a service, lecture or social event on any given day.

After 1965, K' Road lost most of its local customer base when construction of the inner-city motorway system resulted in over 50,000 people having to move out of the surrounding areas in Eden Terrace, Grafton, and Arch Hill. The downturn in trade led to many shops closing and the relocating of businesses to other areas of Auckland. This accelerated the decline, and by the early 1970s the low rents in the western portion of the street meant it had acquired a rather seedy reputation as Auckland's red-light district, although the adult industry never accounted for more than 4% of the businesses in the area at any time.

Since the early 1990s there has been a move away from this image largely due to newly constructed apartment blocks attracting residents back to the area, as well as a general gentrification of close by areas such as Ponsonby and Grey Lynn. Karangahape Road is probably the most notorious street in the country, as most people imagine it is lined with strip clubs, brothels and adult shops. The reality is different; despite the street's reputation very few enterprises are connected with the adult industry; the proportion of adult establishments to more ordinary businesses has remained fairly constant at about 3% between the early 1960s (when the first red light business appeared) and today. Even at its height of its reputation (between the 1970s and 1990s) as the biggest red light area in the country, there were never more than 12 adult businesses at a time on the street. Today there are 150 shops along the main road, K Road, and around 700 businesses in the general area - in 2010 only 8 were connected with the sex industry - in 2022 there are 6.

K Road currently boasts an eclectic collection of shops, cafés and dealer art galleries. Since the early 1990s it has developed as a focus for nightlife; its restaurants, bars and nightclubs make it a major part of Auckland's social scene. This is largely due to redevelopment of the Queen Street valley in the 1980s as increased rents made many nightclub venues relocate to the K Road ridge. Since the mid 1990s K Road has become a centre for much of Auckland's bohemian scene, with many venues for alternative music and fringe art as well as the LGBT community. In 2007, a museum dedicated to the preservation of sapphic lesbian culture was created and the Charlotte Museum Trust was registered. The organisation became part of the Te Papa National Museum Standards programme and currently occupies space just off of K Road on Howe Street. This area is also known for its trendy op shops, and craft and art collectives.

The street received a major upgrade of its footpaths and street furniture which finished in 2006, at a cost of NZ$3.5 million. As of 2009, approximately 400 businesses were on K Road.

In 2011 the Karangahape Road overbridge had a $2.1 million upgrade as part of the Rugby World Cup Celebration. Designed by Opus Architecture and funded by Auckland Transport, it took 6 weeks to complete. Included in the design were three internally lit perspex pylons which act as entry markers for the bridge designed by the Tongan artist Filipe Tohi. In 2021, a Rainbow Crossing was installed to celebrate the area's history as a refuge for queer people.

== Demographics ==
The statistical areas of Karangahape West and East, which include the streets between Hopetoun Street-Beresford Square to the north, and the northwestern motorway to the south, covers 0.29 km^{2} (0.11 sq mi) and had an estimated population of 2,440 as of June 2025, with a population density of 8,414 people per km^{2}.

Historical population
Year	Pop.	±% p.a.
2006	1,413	—
2013	1,803	+3.54%
2018	2,307	+5.05%
2023	2,334	+0.23%

The Karangahape statistical areas had a population of 2,334 in the 2023 New Zealand census, an increase of 27 people (1.2%) since the 2018 census, and an increase of 531 people (29.5%) since the 2013 census. There were 1,281 males, 1,026 females and 30 people of other genders in 1,278 dwellings. 16.7% of people identified as LGBTIQ+. There were 138 people (5.9%) aged under 15 years, 645 (27.6%) aged 15 to 29, 1,284 (55.0%) aged 30 to 64, and 264 (11.3%) aged 65 or older.

People could identify as more than one ethnicity. The results were 60.5% European (Pākehā); 11.2% Māori; 5.4% Pasifika; 27.4% Asian; 6.7% Middle Eastern, Latin American and African New Zealanders (MELAA); and 2.4% other, which includes people giving their ethnicity as "New Zealander". English was spoken by 95.9%, Māori language by 2.2%, Samoan by 1.0%, and other languages by 32.0%. No language could be spoken by 1.3% (e.g. too young to talk). New Zealand Sign Language was known by 0.4%. The percentage of people born overseas was 50.1, compared with 28.8% nationally.

Religious affiliations were 26.0% Christian, 4.2% Hindu, 2.2% Islam, 0.5% Māori religious beliefs, 2.3% Buddhist, 0.8% New Age, 0.4% Jewish, and 2.3% other religions. People who answered that they had no religion were 56.4%, and 5.3% of people did not answer the census question.

Of those at least 15 years old, 1,020 (46.4%) people had a bachelor's or higher degree, 774 (35.2%) had a post-high school certificate or diploma, and 396 (18.0%) people exclusively held high school qualifications. 456 people (20.8%) earned over $100,000 compared to 12.1% nationally. The employment status of those at least 15 was that 1,386 (63.1%) people were employed full-time, 234 (10.7%) were part-time, and 72 (3.3%) were unemployed.

Individual statistical areas
Name	Area (km^{2})	Population	Density (per km^{2})	Dwellings	Median age	Median income
Karangahape West	0.17	1,089	6,406	597	38.8 years	$61,900
Karangahape East	0.12	1,245	10,375	681	34.7 years	$48,200
New Zealand					38.1 years	$41,500

== Notable buildings and landmarks ==
=== Symonds Street intersection ===
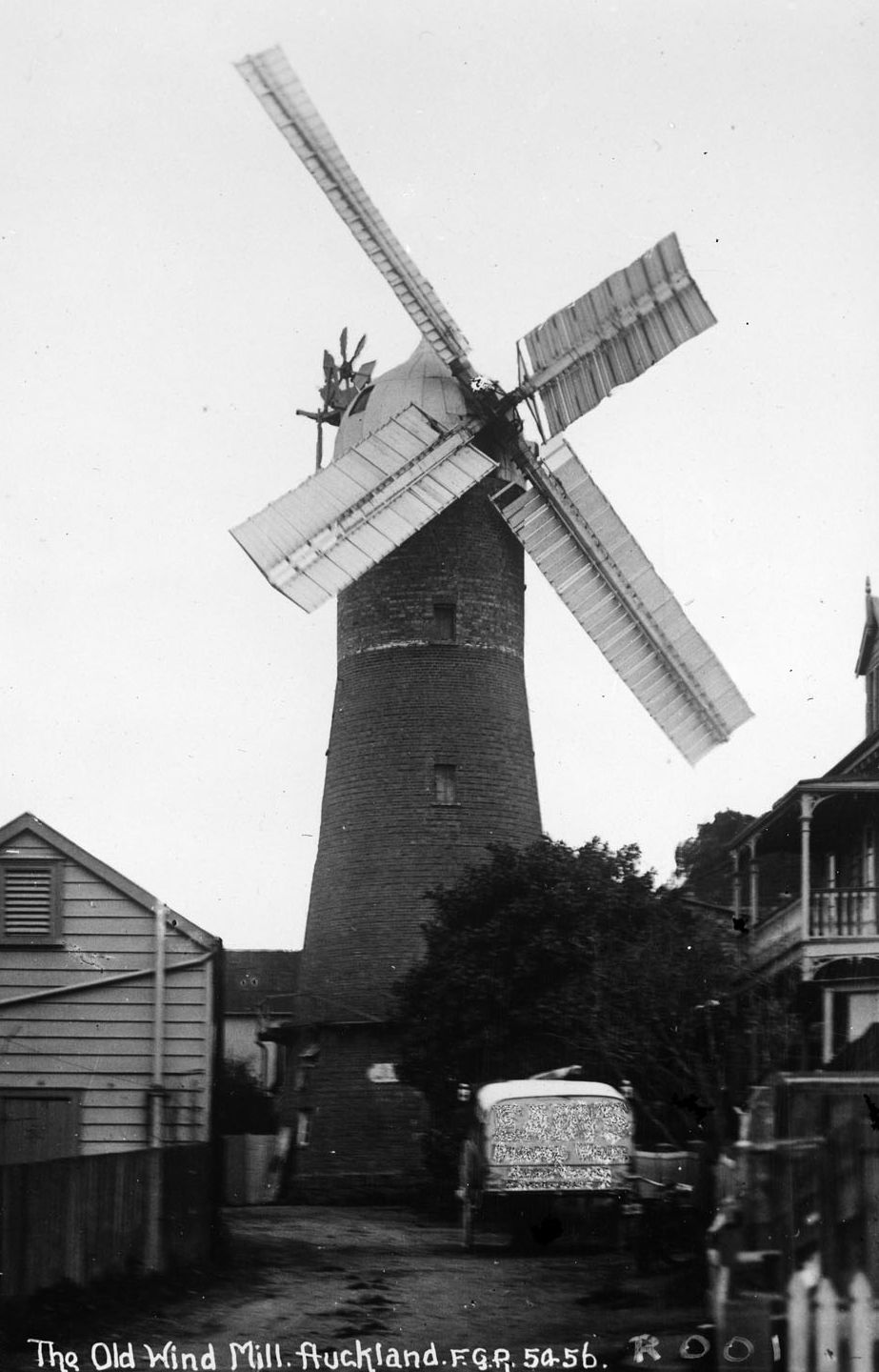
Partington's Windmill

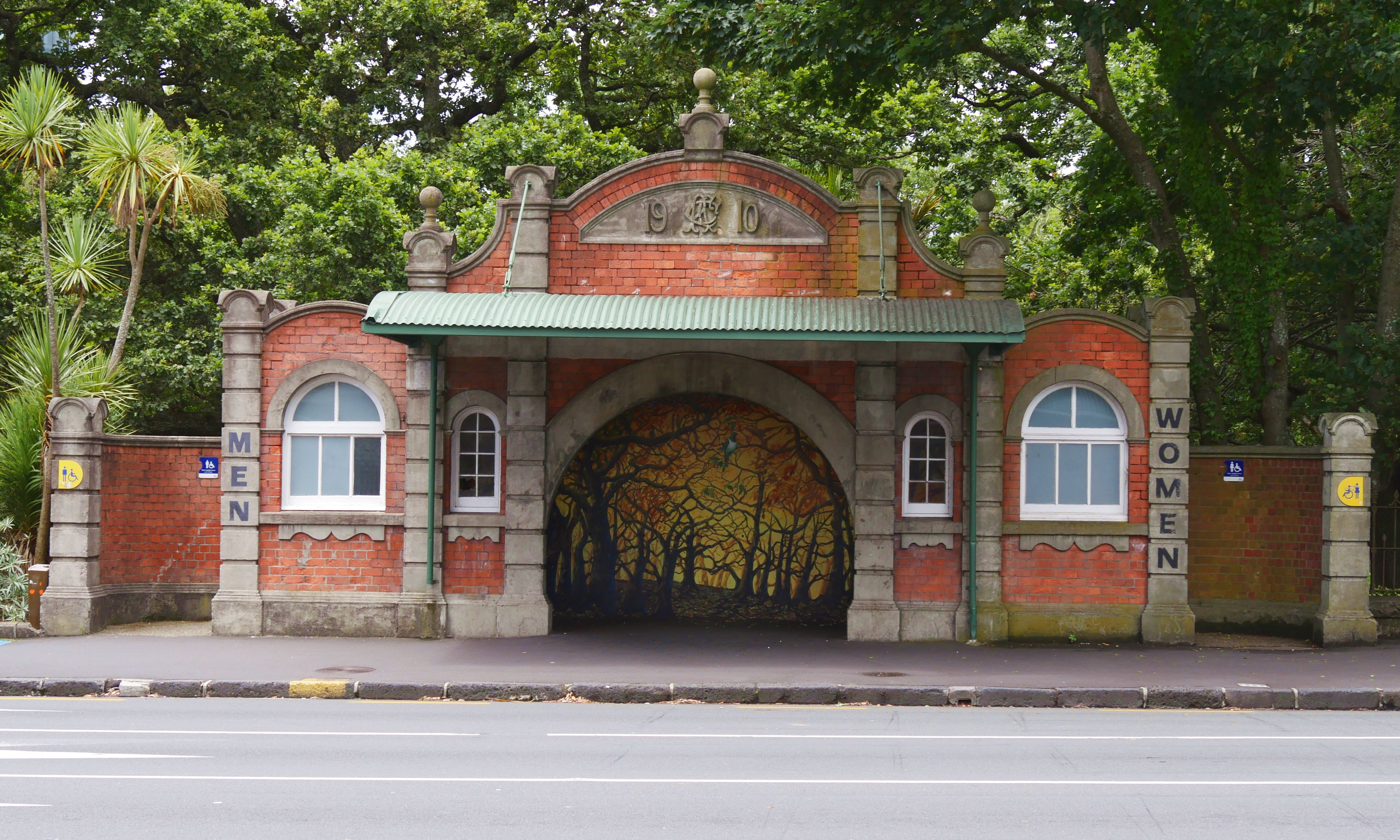
Symonds Street tram shelter

- Cordis Hotel, 77–79 Symonds Street. At the corner of Karangahape Road and Symonds Street. This was a Sheraton Hotel before becoming part of the Langham chain. In 2017, Langham Hotel was renamed the Cordis Hotel. Partington's Windmill stood on the site from 1850 to 1950. The windmill's demolition was controversial and led to laws for heritage protection and the formation of Heritage New Zealand.
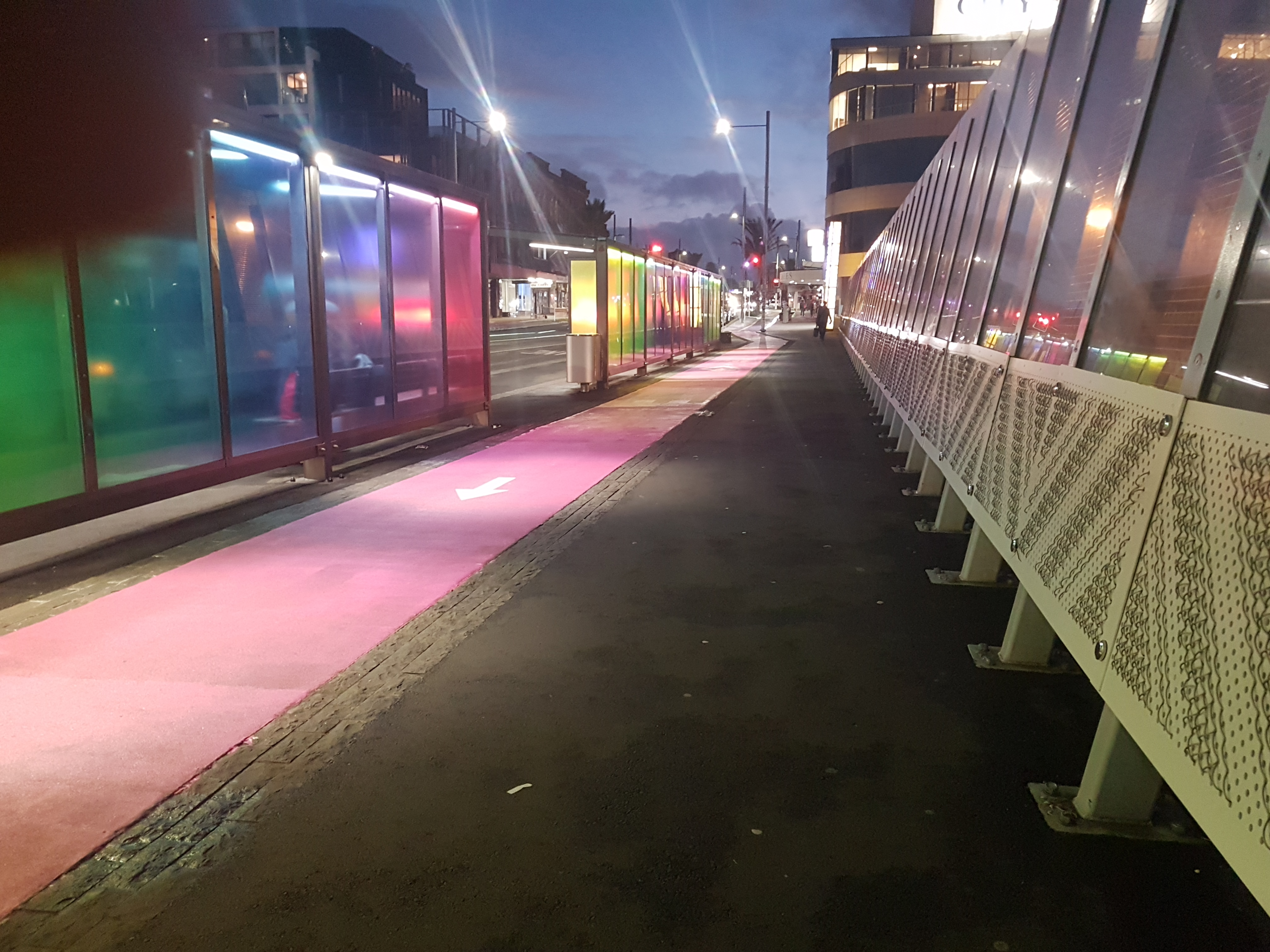
- Karangahape Road Motorway Bridge at night
  Grafton Bridge, 1910. At the eastern end of Karangahape Road, a large concrete structure spanning Grafton Gully. When it was completed in 1910 it was the largest concrete single-span bridge in the world. Its construction required disturbing only eight graves.
- 1910 tram shelter, Symonds Street. Built in 1910 by Auckland City Council to accompany the adjoining bridge this ornate tram shelter includes public toilets. These may have been the first public toilets for women.
- Symonds Street Cemetery, one of the oldest cemeteries in Auckland and the first official burial ground. Here are located the graves of many of Auckland's early settlers including Captain William Hobson, the first Governor of New Zealand who died in 1842. The cemetery was officially closed in 1905 when it was handed over to the Auckland City Council as a park. When the motorway system was constructed in the mid 1960s, it required the moving of over 4100 bodies. These were reinterred in two memorial sites within the cemetery.
- Karangahape Rocks, a 1969 sculpture by Greer Twiss at Pigeon Park, on the corner of Symonds Street and Karangahape Road.
- Jewish Centennial Memorial Hall. Designed by Albert Goldwater and his son John Goldwater this structure is in the International Modernist style. Dating from 1953 this chapel and mortuary replaces an earlier wooden building from the 19th century. It commemorates the first Jewish religious ceremony held in New Zealand in 1853.

=== Queen Street intersection ===
- Former Bank of New South Wales. 111 Karangahape Road. 1926 Neo-Georgian building. During the first half of the 20th century banks so favoured the use of this style that it was even satirised as "Bankers Georgian". This is the first project in New Zealand by the Australian Engineering firm of Stevenson and Turner, who have subsequently been responsible for most of the larger hospitals.
- Baptist Tabernacle, 1884, Edmund Bell architect. 429–431 Queen St. This brick and stucco structure was designed in the Imperial Roman style. Based upon the London Metropolitan Tabernacle located at the Elephant and Castle. The Portico is a quotation from the Pantheon in Rome.
- Ironbank, 150–154 K Road: An award-winning modern (2009) mixed-used development lauded and criticised for looking like "rusting containers".
- J Morris Ltd, 151 Karangahape Road. English Baroque style building by William Holman. J Morris Ltd was a Homewares store which has the record of organising the first Auckland Christmas Parade in 1912, an idea later copied by George Courts and eventually the Farmers Trading Company.
- Melverns, 155 K Road. Neo-Greek building from around 1926 for a Homewares store. Upstairs was located the Savoy Tea Rooms and Reception Hall.
- The Bristol – 161 K Road. Neo-classical building by the prestigious firm of Gummer and Ford. Piano showroom for the Bristol Piano Company. After the closure of the Bristol this became Snedden's Haberdashery Store.
- Verona Buildings 165 K Road. A Neo-Greek style building from 1923 designed by Walter Arthur Cumming. This structure takes its name from the earlier wooden house which occupied this site – a two storied Kauri house built for a Doctor Holloway in 1884.
- St Kevin's Arcade, 1924, extended 1926, Walter Arthur Cumming architect. 183 K Road. A shopping arcade in the 1920s Neo-Greek style. It incorporates the K Road entrance to Myers Park. In the mid-19th century when Auckland was the capital of New Zealand, this was the site of the second Government House in Auckland, while the Old Government House, now part of the University of Auckland was being rebuilt after the 1848 fire. The arcade takes its name from that house, Saint Keven's, which occupied this site until 1922.
- Thief and Twist, two bronze statues by Tanja McMillan (Misery) and John Oz outside St Kevin's Arcade on opposite sides of the Karangahape Road. Twist was previously installed on Beresford Square, Karangahape, but since moved because of City Rail Link construction of the entrance of Karanga-a-Hape Station
- Myers Park. On the slope of the Karangahape ridge facing north towards the Waitematā Harbour is a natural gully now the site of Myers Park, created by the efforts of, and named after Arthur Myers MP. This is, or rather was, the start of the Waihorotiu Stream also known as the "Queen Street River".
- Espano Flats – 20 Poynton Terrace. Spanish Mission style apartment block by A. Sinclair O'Connor.
- Former Rendell's Department Store, 1904, extended 1911, William Alfred Holman architect. 184 K Road. Brick and stucco retail building in the late 19th century Italianate style. Holman was a relative of William Morris.

=== Pitt Street intersection ===
- Pitt Street Buildings – Queen Anne Style block of shops from 1904. Corner of Pitt St and K Road. Distinguished by several gables, this building is regarded by many as a symbol of the area.
- Pitt Street Church – 78 Pitt Street. 1866 Gothic structure by local architect Philip Herapath with sculptural figures and details by Anton Teutonberg, the first European sculptor in New Zealand.
- Body Positive 1/3 Poynton Terrace, a private street off Pitt street. Established in 1980s, Body positive is a peer support organisation providing care and support to all people living with HIV/AIDS in New Zealand, as well as advocating and combat stigma surrounding HIV. They also provide free HIV and STI testing.
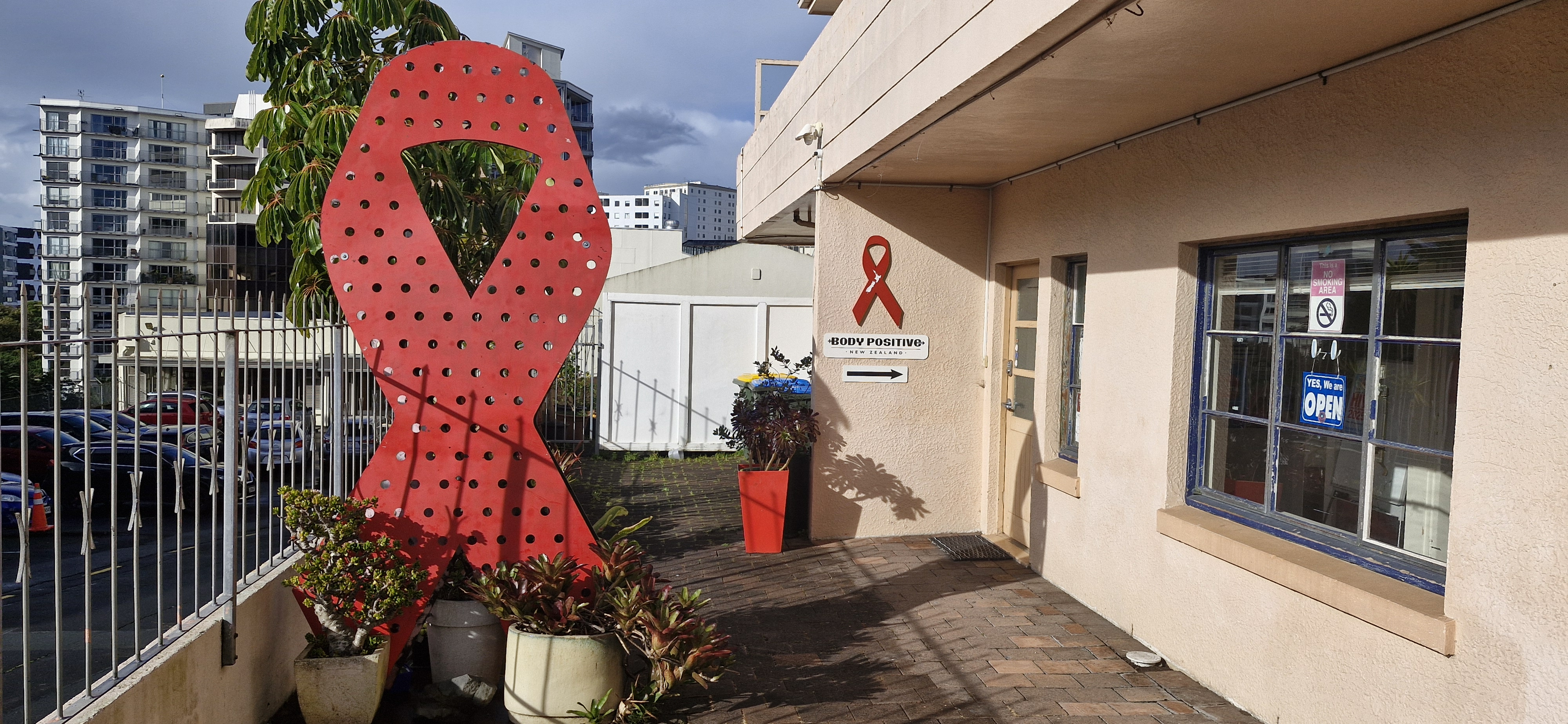
  Body Positive 1/3 Poynton Terrace, Auckland CBD, off Pitt Street near Karangahape Road
- Wesley Bicentennial Hall – 78 Pitt Street. 1940 building By Daniel B Patterson in a mixture of Gothic and Art-Deco styles.
- Central Fire Station – 58 Pitt Street. 1902 Queen Anne style building designed by Goldsboro & Wade architects.
- 1912 Fire Station – One Beresford Square. Designed by Goldsboro & Wade architects. Extension to the earlier 1902 structure.
- Former Beresford Street Congregationalist Church – 19 Beresford Square. 1875 Neo-Greek Style building by Philip Herapath. Possibly the second oldest concrete structure in the country. Now called Hopetoun Alpha.
- Naval & Family Hotel – 1897, Arthur Pollard Wilson architect, who also designed Strand Arcade, Arthur H Nathan Warehouse, Northern Steam Ship Company Building and Isaacs’ Bonded Stores. Corner of Pitt Street and K Road. An ornate three-storey building with Italianate, English Baroque and Queen Anne influences. A veranda was added in the 1940s, the original building being designed without one, in common with many hotels of the colonial period, to discourage intoxicated men from loitering outside. It has an Historic Places Trust B classification, which protects the exterior. A Georgian-style hotel occupied the site from about 1862 until it burnt down in 1894.

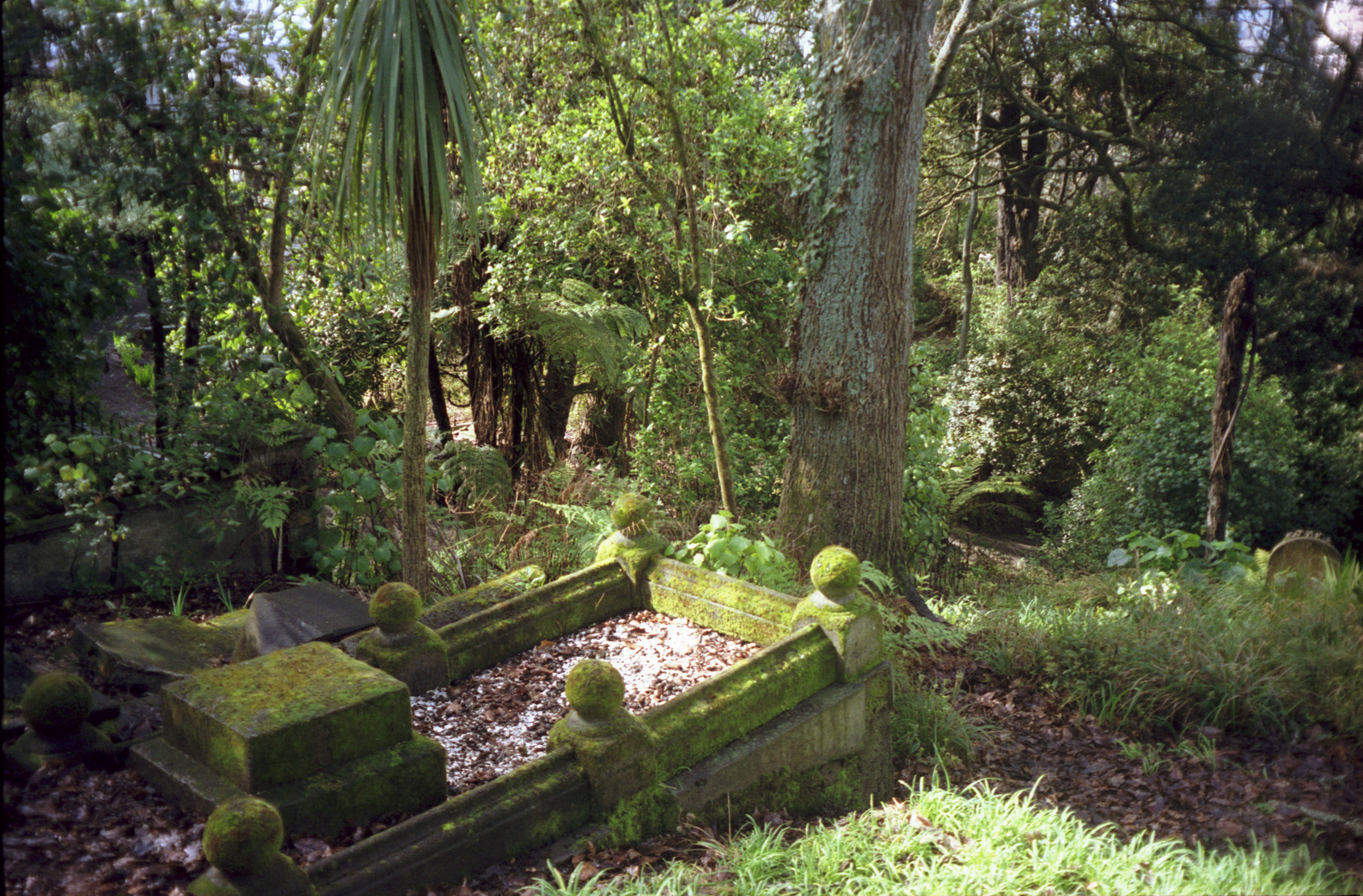
Symonds St Cemetery.

- Former Palace Theatre (also known as Newton Picture Palace until 1915) – 251–253 Karangahape road. Built as a Foresters Hall in 1884 this was turned into a cinema in 1911. In 1926 R&W Hellaby Ltd converted the theatre into shops with the top floor becoming a cabaret and dance floor. The first female City Councillor, Ellen Meville made speeches here.
- Former George Court and Sons Department Store – 1924, Clinton Savage architect, based on Selfridges in Oxford Street, London. 238 K Road; Corner K Road and Mercury Lane. Proto-modern building showing the influence of Frank Lloyd Wright and Otto Wagner. The Court brothers opened their first drapery store on K Road in the 1890s (cnr Liverpool St).
- Mercury Theatre
  Mercury Theatre – 1910, Edward Bartley architect. 9 Mercury Lane. The oldest surviving theatre in Auckland. This English Baroque styled building was constructed in 1910 as the Kings Theatre for Sir Benjamin Fuller. When it was converted into a cinema in 1926 a new entrance on K Road was built (now the Norman Ng building). Between 1962 and 1990 this was the location of the Mercury Theatre Company. The street's name, France Street, was changed to Mercury Lane in the 1990s in memory of the Theatre Company. Currently owned by a church, it is occasionally used as a theatre.
- Norman Ng Building – 256 Karangahape Road. 1926 entrance to the Prince Edward Picture Theatre (previously the King's Theatre) designed by Daniel B Patterson for Sir Benjamin Fuller. After the cinema closed in 1959 this building was sold off and purchased by Norman Ng who ran a fruit & vegetable shop here. A popular café called Brazil was located here for almost two decades from the early 1990s, a succession of cafes has succeeded it. The renovated interior boasts many original Art-Deco features.

=== East Street intersection ===
- Samoa House – 283 Karangahape Road. Modernist building by JASMAD architects (now JASMAX) Location of the Samoan Consulate. Includes the first Fale built outside of Samoa.
- Newton Post Office – 292–300 Karangahape Road. 1973 modernist building by the firm of Mark-Brown, Fairhead and Sang for the Ministry of Works. The Bronze bas-relief on the main facade by Guy Ngan.
- The Las Vegas Girl – 335 Karangahape Road. The most obvious example of the K Rd's reputation as a red-light district of the 1960s–90s. The large sign of a nude woman conceals a building from about 1900, built as Frederick Prime's Hardware Store. Until the late 1980s the ground floor was occupied by a T&T Childrenwear shop.
- Former Le Bon Marche Department Store – Joseph Zahara, who had previously worked at the Bon Marche in Paris and John Lewis in London opened a French Millinery Emporium here before the First War. Zahara's business expanded and eventually occupied three buildings on this site becoming the largest Millinery establishment in the Dominion. He employed the architect A.Sinclair O'Connor to unify the disparate facades with an Art-Deco treatment across all three buildings. In the 1930s Zahara advertised that he had a million hats in stock and as well as tearooms there was an indoor miniature golf course provided for the use of customers.
- Former Vogue Picture Theatre. Former Vogue Cinema – The cinema, designed by the architects A.Sinclair O'Connor and J. Christie was constructed in 1914. Its facade was incorporated into the Bon Marche Chambers next door which was occupied by the theatre's proprietor M.J. Zahara. It went through name changes from the "Arcadia", to the "Star" and finally the "Vogue". In 1939–1940 its interior received a streamline modern-art-deco make over by A.Sinclair O'Connor. The Vogue closed in 1955 and was used as warehouse space and a carpet & lino showroom until the early 1990s. Its interior was extensively renovated around 1991 as DTM, a Gay nightclub. It has continued to be used as a nightclub venue since then. Portions of the 1930s interior survive.
- Wrights Confectionary Factory – 358 K Road. 1917 building which contained a factory above a cake shop & tearooms run by George Wright.
- Former Newton Hotel – 382 Karangahape Road. This building probably dates from around 1866 making it the oldest building in the area. Due to changes in the licensing laws it ceased to be a pub in 1909 and was used as retail shops until it became a Café/bar called Kamo in the early 1990s.

=== Howe Street intersection ===
- the "Chaise Lange" – 461 Karangahape Road. Sculptural seat by New Zealand ceramic artist Peter Lange.
- Hellaby's Corner – Built before 1900 as an independent butchers shop, this became a branch of Hellaby's Butchers around 1913 and remained one into the 1960s. In the 1980s, Clown's restaurant was located here. Currently the Thirsty Dog Pub.
- Garrets Block – Cnr Howe street. 1886 brick retail buildings for the Garrett Brothers who operated a boot manufacturing & retail establishment here. These buildings replaced wooden shops which burnt down in a great fire in 1885 which destroyed this entire block.
- Purchas Block – 444–472 Karangahape Road. Designed by Edward Bartley and built in 1884 for Dr Purchas. Expensive English red brick and Oamaru Stone detailing is used on the facades. The bronze shop window frames and Mintons tile shop fronts date from the 1930s.

=== Edinburgh Street intersection ===
444-472 Karangahape Road, east of the Edinburgh Street intersection

- Pacific Island Church – Edinburgh Street. This is the First Pacific Island Church in New Zealand, founded by the late Susuga a le Toeaina Reverend Leuatea Sio in 1947. The current building dates from 1962 and was used as a location for the wedding scenes in the 2006 film Sione's Wedding and a similar scene in the 2012 sequel film.
- Pacific Island Church Memorial – outside the church is a granite obelisk erected in 1997 to commemorate the 50-year anniversary of the founding of the church in 1947 by the late Susuga a le Toeaina Reverend Leuatea Sio. The obelisk is engraved with Pacific Island images and patterns; the lamp which surmounted it has been recently restored.
- Pacific Island Church Hall – The current building dates from 1979 and was opened by the then Prime Minister Robert Muldoon, it replaces several late Victorian wooden buildings which had been the centre of the Newton Presbyterian Church.
- Maori Hall – 5 Edinburgh Street. 1907 Foresters Hall turned into a Maori community facility in 1931. Currently owned by the PI Church opposite.

=== Hereford Street intersection ===
- George Wallace Building – 510 Karangahape Road. Built in 1913 as a furniture store this was the location of the Pink Pussy Cat Club from 1963 to 2001
- M.J.Bennett Building – 501 Karangahape Rd. Built for M J Bennett Ltd, a firm of decorators, house painters and colour merchants. This building is circa 1902, which is later than the adjacent buildings which are from 1886. The wooden shops which previously occupied this block were burnt down in a great fire in 1885. From 1885 until 1902 the Newton Volunteer Fire Brigade was located on this site prior to the formation of the Auckland Municipal Fire Board in 1902 and the construction of the fire station in nearby Pitt street the same year. Mathew James Bennett was the first president of the Karangahape Road Businessmen's Association in 1924.
- Ambury & English Building – 531 Karangahape Road. Currently Joy Bong Thai restaurant. An early tenant was the Ambury & English Devonshire Dairy. In the 1970s the KG nightclub was located here, one of NZ's first lesbian nightclubs.
- Old Folks Coronation Hall – 8 Gundry Street. Community Hall designed by Henry Kulka, a pupil of Adolf Loos in 1953, partially funded with money to celebrate the Queen's Coronation. Opened by Sir Bill Jordan. The Auckland Old Folks Association was founded in 1945 and still operates the hall as a community facility.

=== Ponsonby Road intersection ===
- Ponsonby Reservoir – The first reservoir on this site was designed by City Engineer William Errington. That structure from the 1880s was rebuilt in the 1950s when the adjoining pumping station and Turncock's house were demolished. This reservoir is gravity fed with water from the Waitākere Ranges.
- Vaana Peace Mural – Visual Artists Against Nuclear Arms. In 1985, eight founding VAANA artists: Pat Hanly, Margaret Lawlor-Bartlett, Jill Carter-Hansen, John Nicol, John Eaden, Claudia Pond Eyley, Nigel Brown and Vanya Lowry each painted large panels in the main gallery at Outreach (now Artstation) with members of the public giving verbal encouragement. Master potters Peter Lange and Lex Dawson worked with Master Builder Matt Stafford to fix the panels to the wall. The mural was recreated in 2006 with extra panels being added.

== Media connections ==
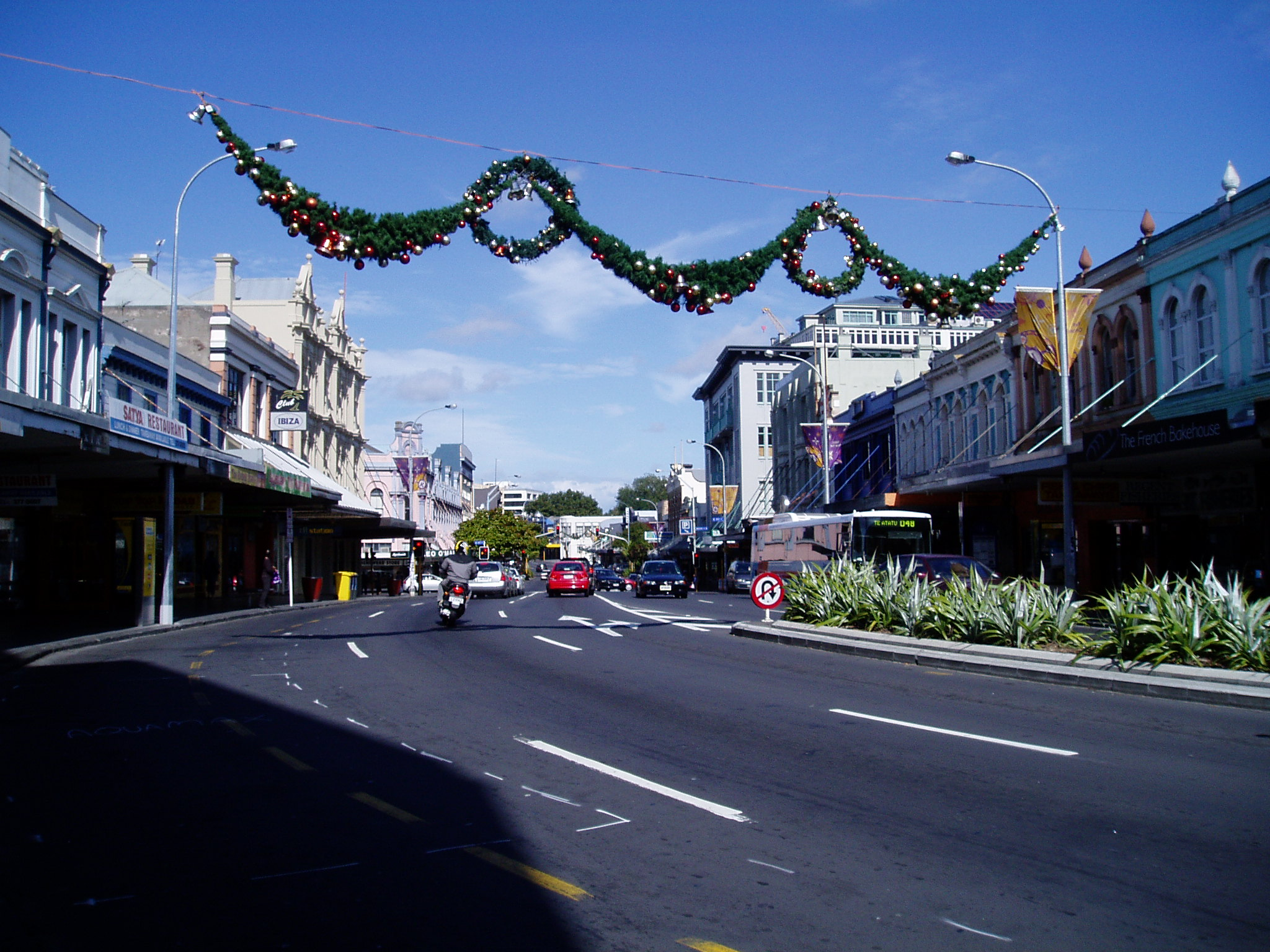
Western part of K' Road, looking east

Two radio stations, K FM Radio and Boosh.FM, operate from the street. K FM Radio broadcasts on the frequency 106.9 to most of the Auckland central business district and some of the inner-city suburbs. It plays reggae, dub, lounge, jazz, blues, funk and hip-hop in an attempt to reflect the diverse and alternative culture of Karangahape Road. Originally broadcasting from St.Kevin's Arcade, it is now based at 208 Karangahape Road.

The Auckland office of the New Zealand Film Archive was located in 300 Karangahape Road until about 2012, where the institute had a reference library and exhibition space.

== In popular culture ==
The song "Verona" by New Zealand rock band Elemeno P, from their album Love & Disrespect, refers to the café/restaurant/bar of the same name at 169 Karangahape Road. The current Verona building dates from 1923 and takes its name from the Victorian house that previously occupied the site, Mrs Bishop's "Verona" Boarding House.

Geddes Dental Renovations was a dental firm located in the K Road area on Queen Street. The company's radio jingle (broadcast from 1949 until the early 1980s) became a defining part of Auckland's culture; it was said it was possible to ascertain the presence of Aucklanders anywhere in the world by singing the Geddes' song.

Sung to the tune 'My Darling Clementine'

Broke my denture, broke my denture. Woe is me, what shall I do?

Take it in to Mr. Geddes, and he'll fix it just like NEW.

What's the address, what's the address? Hurry please, and tell me DO!

Top of Queen Street, on the corner, and the number's Four – Nine – TWO.

== In film & TV ==
- 1987 Walkshort: a short film directed by Bill Toepfer featuring Harry Sinclair and Don McGlashan
- 1987 Jewel's Darl: a short film by Peter Wells starring Georgina Beyer, one of the scenes takes place on K Road.
- 1995 TV interview by Mark Staufer of Jordan Luck as his band The Exponents plays on a rooftop on K Road to promote a new album and tour.
- 1998 "I Can Change" by Trip to the Moon: Music Video showing several scenes on K Road. A collaboration between Tom Ludvigson and Trevor Reekie with Bobbylon of the Hallelujah Picassos on vocals.
- 1999 Ode to K' Rd Music Video by "Peter Stuyvesant Hitlist" – filmed entirely on K Road.
- 2004 1Nite Full-length feature film by Amarbir Singh – centring largely around K Road.
- 2005 The song "Verona" by New Zealand rock band Elemeno P, from their album Love & Disrespect
- 2006 Sione's Wedding: The Wedding scene is filmed in the Pacific Island Church in Edinburgh Street
- 2012 Sione's 2: Unfinished Business: several outdoor scenes were shot on K Road.
- 2017 Queens of Panguru: Parts of the first episode were filmed around K Road.
- 2024 The Boy, The Queen, And Everything In Between: filmed around K Road.

== Famous shops on K Road ==
A number of nationally known shops and brand names either started on Karangahape Road or had a branch there.

=== Victorian to World War I ===
- Partington's Victoria Flour Mill and Steam Biscuit Manufactury. 1850–1950.
- Lewis Eady – 19 (now 75) K Road. Piano importer. Founded in the 1860s, still one of the biggest musical instrument stores but no longer on K Road.
- Wendals Wine Bar – 128 (now 290) Karangahape Road. First wine bar in New Zealand (1876). Now defunct.
- Rendells – 62 (now 184) K Road. Clothing store founded in 1884 at 42 Pitt St (cnr Grey St). First specialist babywear shop in NZ. Closed 2006.
- M.J. Bennett Ltd – 253–255 (now 529) K Road. The city's premier paint shop and interior decorating firm operated by Mathew James Bennett and his wife.
- J. Morris Ltd – 37–41 (now 145) K Road. Housewares store which organised the first Auckland Christmas Parade in 1912.
- George Court & Sons – major department store 1900–1985 founded in 1900 on K road – Closed mid 1980s.
- Hallenstein Brothers – still a national retailer of menswear. Left K Road in the late 1980s.
- Bradstreets – 102–106 (now 258–264) K Road. Men's drapery shop from 1900, became Hugh Wrights in 1931, which closed in 2011.
- Hannahs – major retailer of shoes, located on K Road from 1913 until the 1990s.
- Pascoes – 64 (now 202) K Road. Flagship store of the jewellery chain, now grown into a major retailing empire – no longer on K road.
- The King's Theatre – France Street (now Mercury Lane). Opened in 1910 and converted into a cinema in 1926. Now the Mercury Theatre.
- The Tivoli Theatre (originally the Alhambra), designed by Henry Eli White – 9-11 (now 42) K Road. Opened in 1913 and demolished in 1980.

=== Interwar period ===
- Stevens – china and gift shop, now a large chain of stores – started on K Road in the 1920s; no longer present.
- Levenes – paint and wallpaper. 174–178 K Road. Started on K Road in the 1930s, developing into a national chain of shops in the 1980s, left K Road in the 1990s.
- Winters Hairdressing – famous salon from the 1920s – still operating on K Road in the 1980s, no longer on K Road.
- Flacksons – ladies outfitters and beauty salon from the 1920s. Closed in the 1970s.
- DE Lockhart Ltd (Pen Corner) – stationery and book sellers; also ran a lending library. Established in Ponsonby in the 1920s, before relocating to the corner of K Road and Howe Street. No longer on K Road.
- Kay's Beauty Salon – one of Auckland's best – relocated in the 1970s.
- Tonson Garlick – Auckland's major furnishing company in the late 19th century – went out of business in the 1930s.
- Bristol Piano Company – major national chain of musical instrument dealers based in Dunedin – closed down in 1933 following the death of the owner.
- Colefax Menswear – an establishment which retained the aura of the 1950s until it closed in the first years of the 21st century.
- R B Brown, The Maple Furnishing Company (later to become Smith & Brown and Maple) – closed in the 1970s.
- Selfridges (NZ) Ltd – 1930s–1950s. Woolworths-like emporium – part of a nationwide chain. No connection with the London emporium.
- J.R.McKenzies – 1950s–1970s. Woolworths-like emporium – part of a nationwide chain, now defunct.
- Sneddens Haberdashery – major firm from the 1920s; went out of business in the 1960s.
- Woolworths – part of a nationwide chain. Closed in the 1990s.
- Leo O'Malley's – menswear store – oldest store on K Road – opened on the corner of Pitt Street in 1935, closed 2019.
- Adams Bruce – 177 K Road. Famous bakery from 1929. Owned by Ernest Adams and Hugh Bruce. No longer on K Road.
- Dominion Wine Bar – 177 K Road. Opened in the 1930s, once the only wine bar in the Auckland Province. Closed in the late 1980s.

=== Post World War II ===
- Geddes Dental Renovations (1945) – 492 Queen Street, Cnr City Rd – had a famous radio commercial. Sold to Guardian Dental in 2002. Building demolished.
- Garth Chester – France St (now Mercury Lane). Furniture showroom of the work of Garth Chester – important 1950s NZ modernist designer.
- Beggs Menswear – originally at 61 Pitt Street - relocated to 55 Pitt Street, closed 2019.
- The Mercury Theatre – France Street. Important live theatre operated by the Mercury Theatre Group. 1968–1991.
- The KG Club – Auckland's first lesbian nightclub, opened in 1972 at 200 Karangahape Road, later moved to St Kevin's Arcade.
- Las Vegas Strip Club – oldest such establishment in NZ – opened in 1962 and closed in 2015.
- Pink Pussy Cat Strip Club – 510 K Road. Owned by Rainton Hastie. Closed in 2001, now a dealer art gallery.

=== 1980s onwards ===
- Chaplins – first gay nightclub on K Road – 119 K Road, circa 1988.
- Dick Smith – was one of the earliest stores of the chain in the country, closed 2016.
- Bergman Gallery – cnr Newton Road, closed 2026 – art gallery.
- Okaioceanikart established in 2007, closed in 2013 – art gallery.
- Tautai Pacific Arts Trust – cnr East Street – art gallery.

== Residents ==
- David Nathan (1816–1883) – merchant and Jewish community leader. Buried in the Symonds Street Cemetery.
- Lewis Eady – piano importer and retailer. Residence on Liverpool Street.
- Rev Dr Arthur Guyon Purchas (1821–1906) – Anglican clergyman, surgeon, musician. Residence on Pitt Street, demolished 1970s.
- Ahmed Zaoui ( ) – refugee, resided in the Dominican Priory in St Benedicts Street from 2004–2007.
