= Ironbank =

Ironbank can refer to several places or buildings:

- Ironbank, South Australia, a municipality in South Australia, Australia.
- Ironbank (Auckland), an award-winning mixed-use development in Auckland, New Zealand.
