= Philip Herapath =

English-born New Zealand architect (1823–1892)

- Born: 19 September 1823; Pilton, Devon, England
- Died: 29 June 1892 (aged 70); Auckland, New Zealand
- Occupation: Architect
- Buildings: Pitt Street Church; Auckland Hospital

Philip Herapath (19 September 1823 – 29 June 1892) was an English-born New Zealand architect, active in Auckland for much of the 1860s to 1880s and designer of a number of notable buildings in the city.

== Early life ==
Born in Pilton, Devon, in England, on 19 September 1823, Philip Herapath (Note: Some sources give his surname as Herepath.) was one of two sons of a builder and his wife. He is likely to have worked as a carpenter in Camberwell in Surrey for a time and may have received some training in architecture from his father. In 1857, he and his wife Emma, who he had married earlier in the year, emigrated to New Zealand. They arrived in Auckland on the Harkaway on 31 May and settled there, living on Karangahape Road.

== Professional practice ==
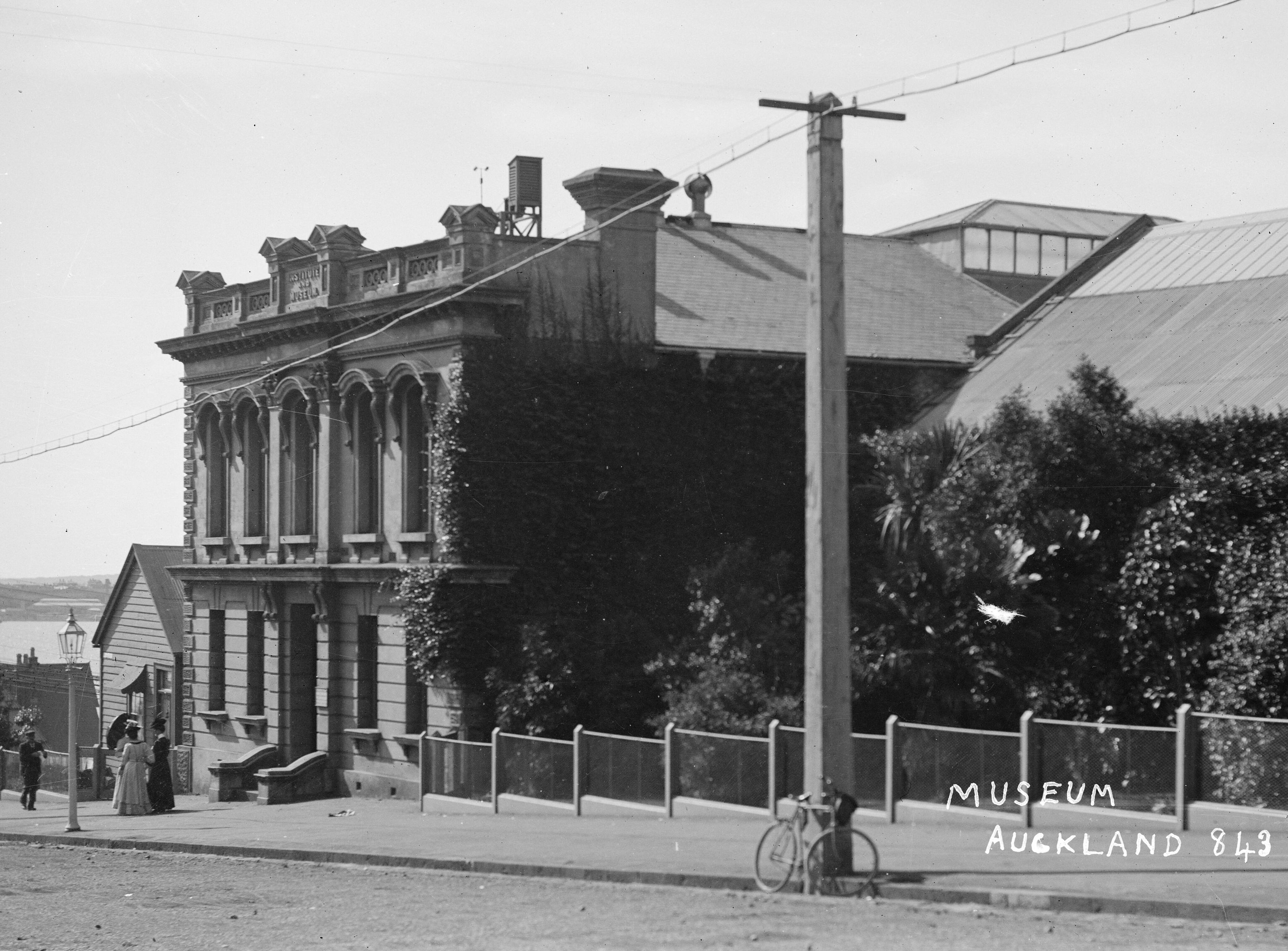
The Auckland Museum on Princes Street was one of Herapath's designs

While Herapath worked as a carpenter during the earlier stages of his life in Auckland, he was advertising his services as an architect by the early 1860s and over the next several years was responsible for the design of around 60 buildings. One of his earliest commissions was an alteration of a Baptist church on Wellesley Street in 1863, and he subsequently became a member of its congregation. He designed the Pitt Street Church for the Wesleyan Methodist Church and this was built in 1865–1866. Despite being part of the temperance movement, he was commissioned to design the Albert Brewery on Elliott Street; this was a plain Victorian design executed in brick. The Auckland Institute and Museum was another of his designs. In 1872 Herapath won a competition for his design for the proposed Auckland Hospital. His entry was Victorian-Italianate in style and the building was completed in 1876.

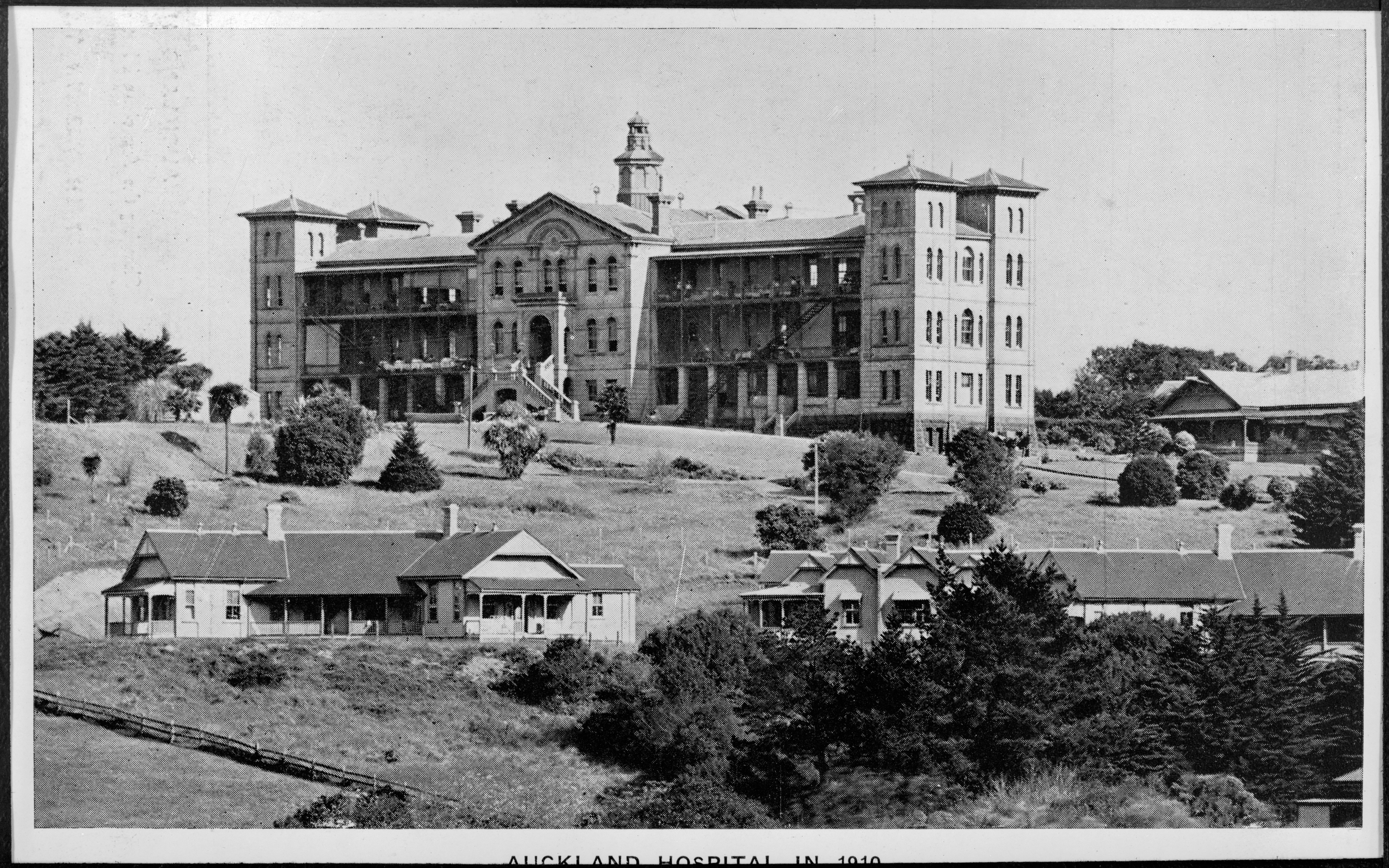
Herapath's Auckland Hospital was completed in 1876 but was demolished in 1963 to make way for new buildings

Herapath played a role in the establishment of the Auckland Institute of Architects in 1881 and became its second president. In this capacity he mediated in a dispute between architects and the Building Association over working conditions. Herapath was joined in his architectural practice by his son Samuel, formalising this by entering into a partnership, Herepath & Son, in around 1883. He was admitted as a fellow of the Royal Institute of British Architects in November 1886.

== Later life ==
Herapath died at his home on Karangahape Road in Auckland on 29 June 1892. Buried in Purewa Cemetery, he was survived by his wife and his sons, Samuel and John.
