= William Alfred Holman =

New Zealand architect

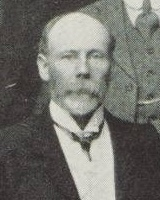
Holman in 1911

William Alfred Holman (18 September 1864 – 1949) was a New Zealand architect and a member of the New Zealand Institute of Architects who designed prominent commercial and residential buildings in Auckland as well as Whangārei, Hamilton, Gisborne and Christchurch.

== Early life ==
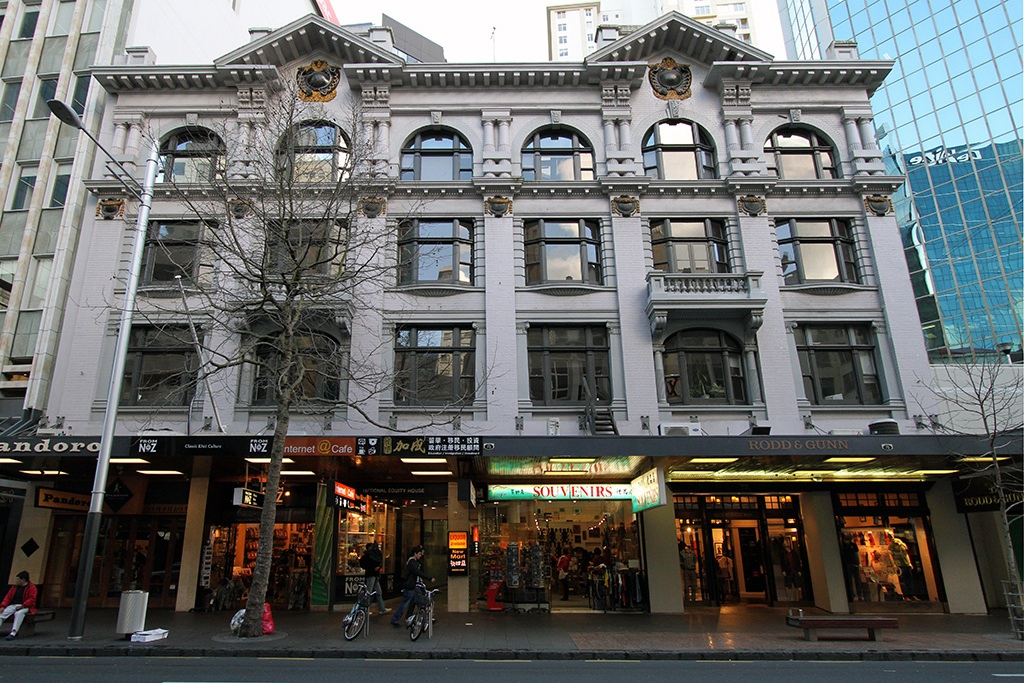
Smeeton's Buildings (now Encom House), designed by Holman in 1910.

Holman was born in Whangārei, the youngest of eight children born to Elizabeth Ann (née Morris, a cousin of the artist William Morris) and Henry Charles Holman. His father moved to New Zealand via Australia from the UK in 1840, married Elizabeth on 16 April 1841, and served as colonial architect and superintendent of public works in the administration of Governor William Hobson. According to his obituary in The Northern Advocate newspaper Henry Holman helped defend the city of Whangārei during the uprising involving Māori leader Hōne Heke. Elizabeth Holman wrote a journal of pioneer life in New Zealand, which has subsequently been published, along with extracts from her letters to Holman.

In 1889 Holman married Rose Gilberd in Sydney.

== Career ==
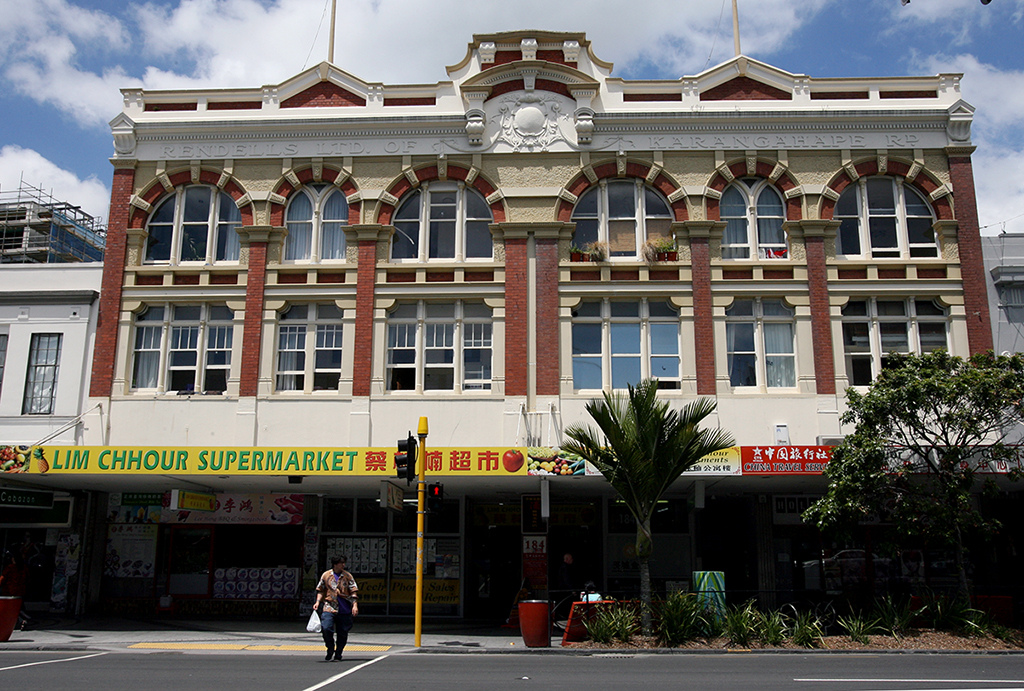
The former Rendells department store, designed by Holman in 1907–11.

Holman trained as an architect under his father, before starting his career in Melbourne. He returned to New Zealand and opened his own practice in Auckland in 1893, later forming the partnership Holman, Moses and Watkin. From 1900 to 1907 his practice articled and trained William Henry Gummer, who would later work under Edwin Lutyens and become one of New Zealand's most influential architects in the 20th century, designing New Zealand's National War Memorial, National Art Gallery and Dominion Museum building.

In 1912 Holman was elected president of the Auckland branch of the New Zealand Institute of Architects. He retired in 1914 from active practice due to ill health, and remained an invalid until his death in 1949, aged 85. The architectural partnership Holman, Moses and Watkin retained his name, and was later responsible for designing the signature Vulcan Buildings on the corner of Queen Street and Vulcan Lane in central Auckland, completed in 1928.

== Buildings ==
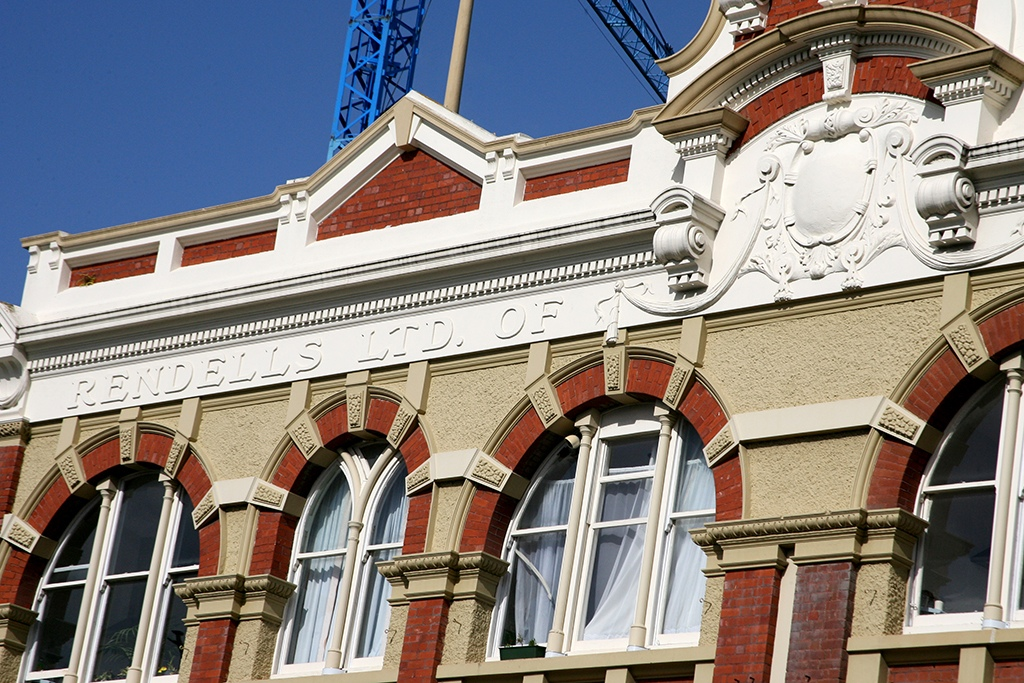
A detail from the facade of the former Rendells department store.

Holman's notable works in Auckland include the former Rendells department store on Karangahape Road, designed in 19th century Edwardian Renaissance style and constructed in two stages, each consisting of a three-storey building, the first in 1907 and the second in 1911. In Auckland's central business district Holman was the architect of the former Smeeton's Buildings at 75 Queen Street, now known as Encom House, built in an Edwardian Baroque style of cement and brick, and completed in 1910. The Smeeton's Buildings was registered as a Historic Place Category II by the New Zealand Historic Places Trust Pouhere Taonga in 1987.

In 1901, Holman also designed a surviving classical Edwardian structure, known as the Commercial Building, at 55 Customs Street, a two-story brick building with an attractive façade topped by an arcaded parapet. Auckland City Council's heritage register notes that "the flamboyance of the building’s façade makes it a significant feature in the streetscape".

Other examples of his successful practice still standing include the former W Lambourne Ltd furniture shop on Auckland's Ponsonby Road.
