= Auckland High Court =

Gothic Revival courthouse in Auckland, New Zealand

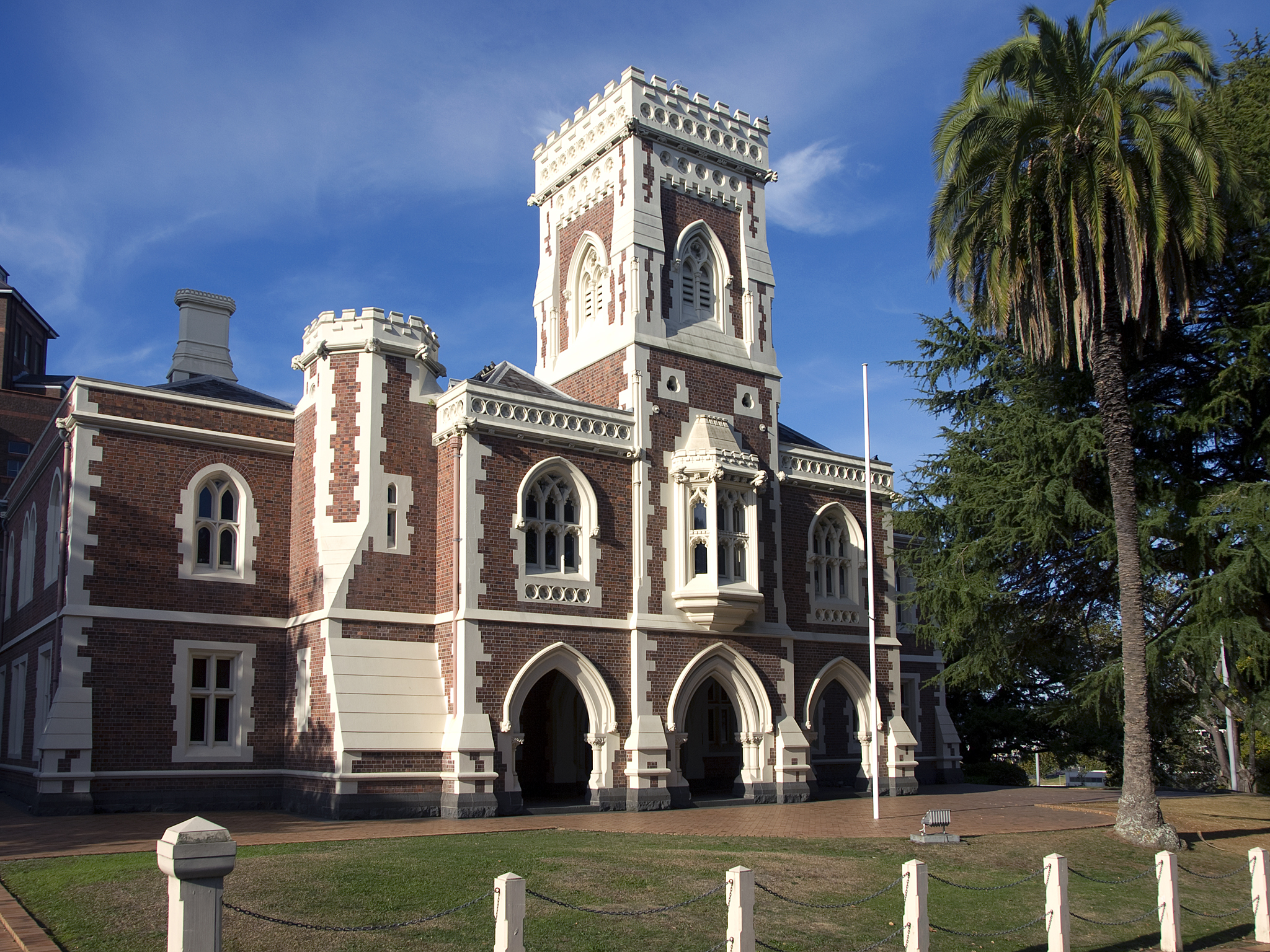
- Interactive map of the Auckland High Court area

General information
- Type: Courthouse
- Architectural style: Gothic Revival
- Location: 22–24 Waterloo Quadrant, Auckland
- Coordinates: 36.849595°S 174.772408°E
- Year built: 1865–1868

Design and construction
- Architect: Edward Rumsey

Heritage New Zealand – Category 1
- Designated: 11 November 1982
- Reference no.: 17

The Auckland High Court is a Gothic Revival courthouse in central Auckland, New Zealand. It is one of three locations nationwide used by the High Court of New Zealand. It is registered as a Category I heritage building by Heritage New Zealand.

== Description ==
The Auckland High Court is a brick Gothic Revival building. It features a crenellated central tower, and pointed-arch arcading. The interior is made of timber and is also Gothic.

== History ==
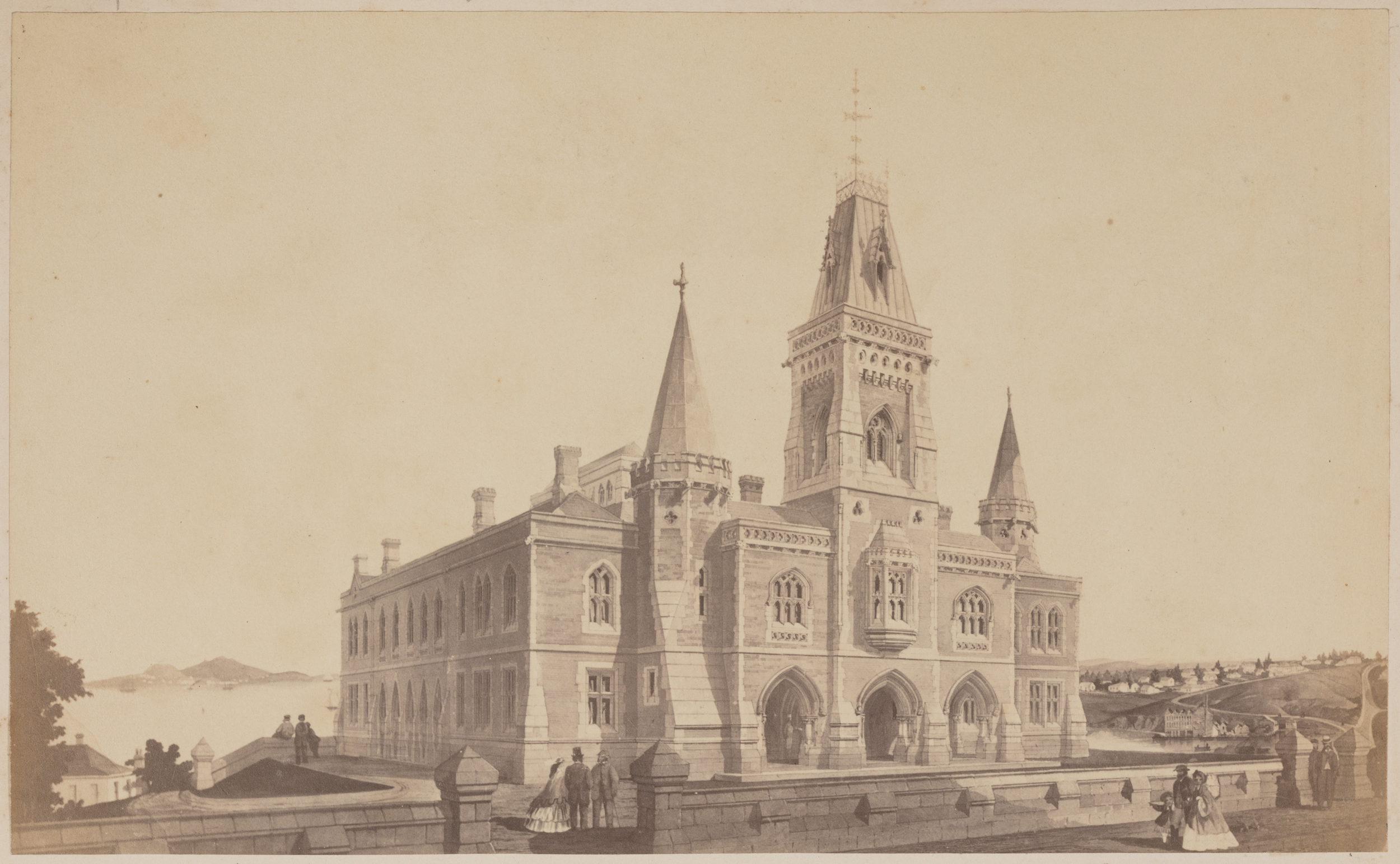
A drawing of the proposed Auckland Supreme Court House made before construction

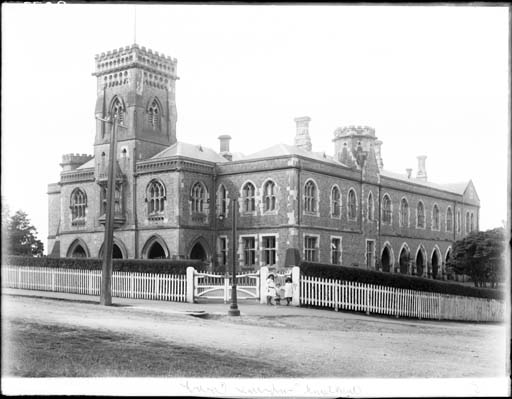
The Auckland Supreme Court c. 1910.

Construction on the courthouse began in 1865, and was halted due to the original builder going bankrupt. Work on the structure was taken up again by Mathews and Bartley, and the building was completed in 1867. The red brick building was designed by Australian architect Edward Rumsey, who was a student of George Gilbert Scott. Rumsey's Gothic Revival design included features such as crenellated towers and gargoyles, which were carved by Prussian ship carpenter Anton Teutenberg, in designs representing judges and major dignitaries of the 1860s. From 1935 to 1936 the building was extended. The courthouse was originally called the Auckland Supreme Court, but the name was changed in 1980 to make way for the naming of an eventual new Supreme Court of New Zealand. In 1988 part of the original building was demolished to expand the courthouse.

Two pōhutukawa trees behind the court mark the location of the General Assembly House, which was used by the New Zealand Parliament when Auckland was the capital of the country.

In the late 20th century, the court was expanded into a new larger complex, in addition to the original courthouse. The courthouse has been restored and earthquake-strengthened, and an additional court building was added to the rear to increase capacity.

== Artworks ==
During the building's construction, Anton Teutenberg added relief sculptures, carvings and gargoyles to the building, many of which depict judges and major dignitaries of the 1860s, including Queen Victoria, Prince Albert, George Grey, Edward Gibbon Wakefield and Hōne Heke. Teutenberg's work is one of the first instances of public sculpture constructed in New Zealand. Teutenberg's carvings of Queen Victoria and Prince Albert face each other on either side of the arch of the central entrance to the court, and these were some of the first works Teutenberg completed for the court. Teutenberg chose to depict Queen Victoria youthfully, similar to how she appeared during her coronation in 1838.

In 1990, a glass and steel sculpture called Waharoa was added to the entranceway of the high court. The work was created by Jacob Manu Scott, who intended the piece to represent the guardianship and partnership of tangata whenua in New Zealand. The entranceway features coloured glass panels, which represent different groups within the area: Ngāti Whātua (purple), green (Tainui), Māori people in general and Māori worldviews (red), and Pākehā (blue).

To the west of the High Court is a sculpture by Fred Graham called Justice, which was added in 1999. The sculpture is formed from three Oamaru limestone pillars, which represents the scales of justice and those involved in court processes. The sculpture also incorporates twelve pieces of wood, and twelve river stones. The wood represents the story of Tāne obtaining the three baskets of knowledge, while the river stones represent the members of a jury.

=== Artwork gallery ===
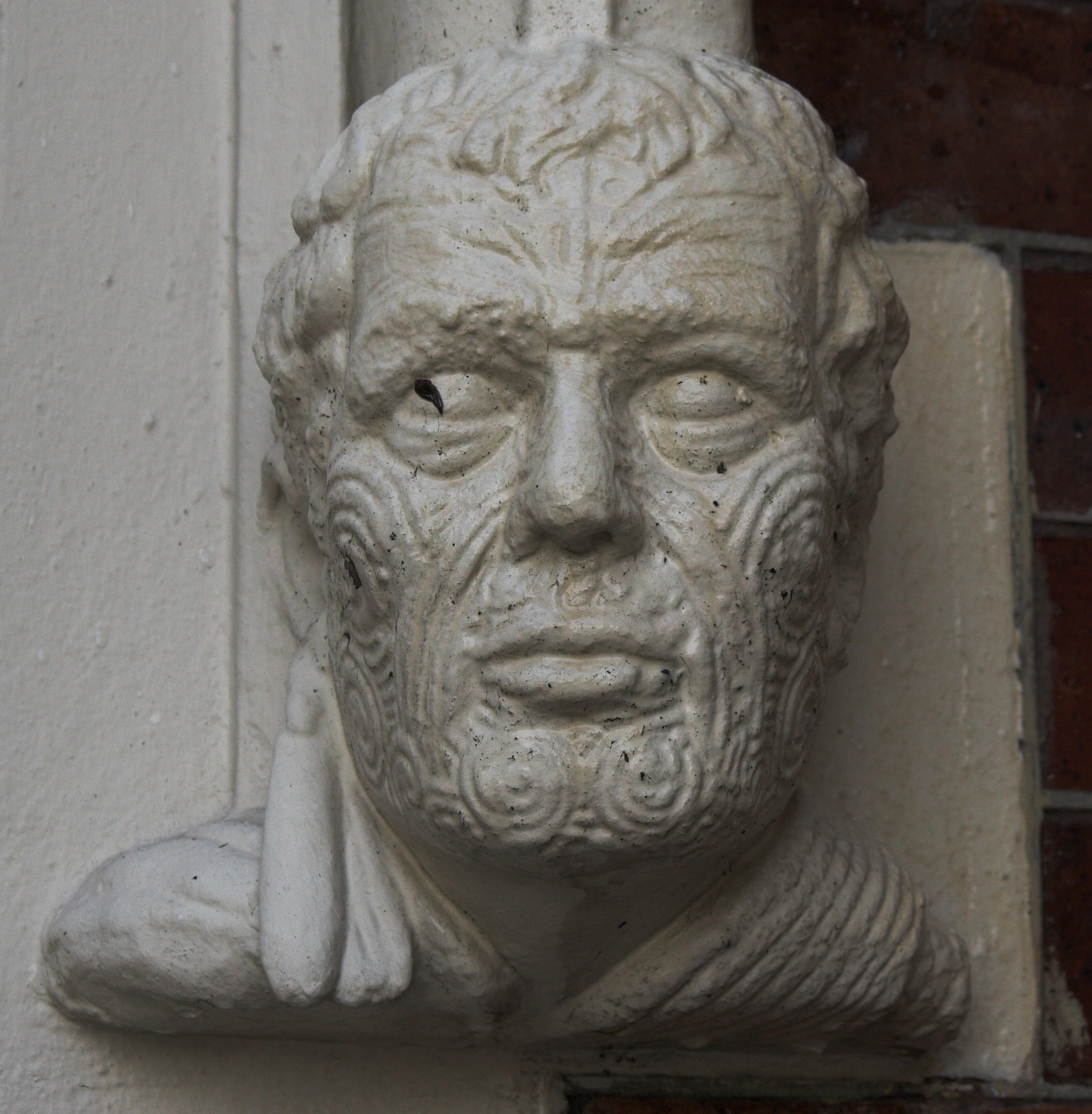
Relief carving by Anton Teutenberg in the 1860s, found along the walls of the High Court

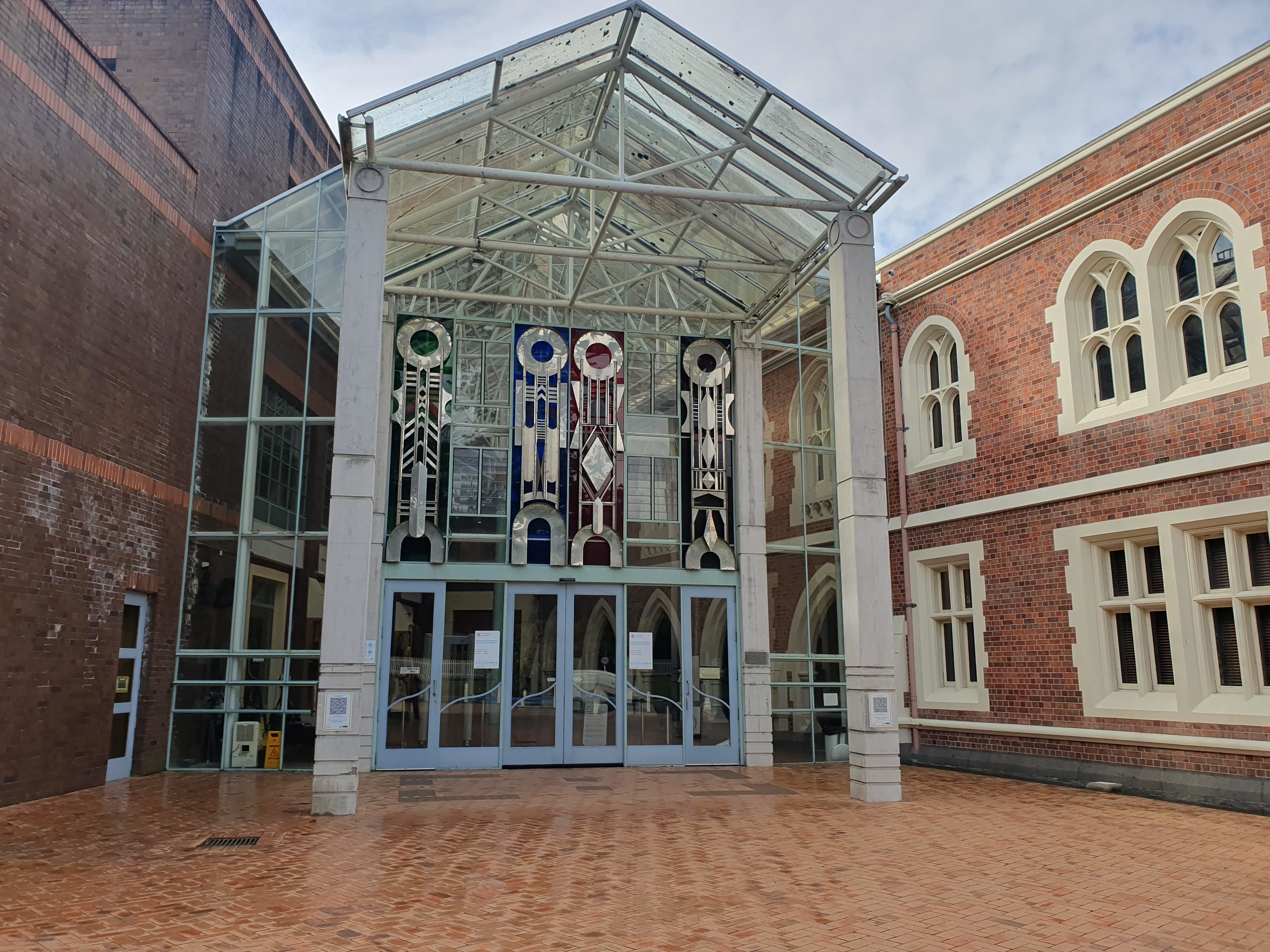
Waharoa (1990) by Jacob Manu Scott

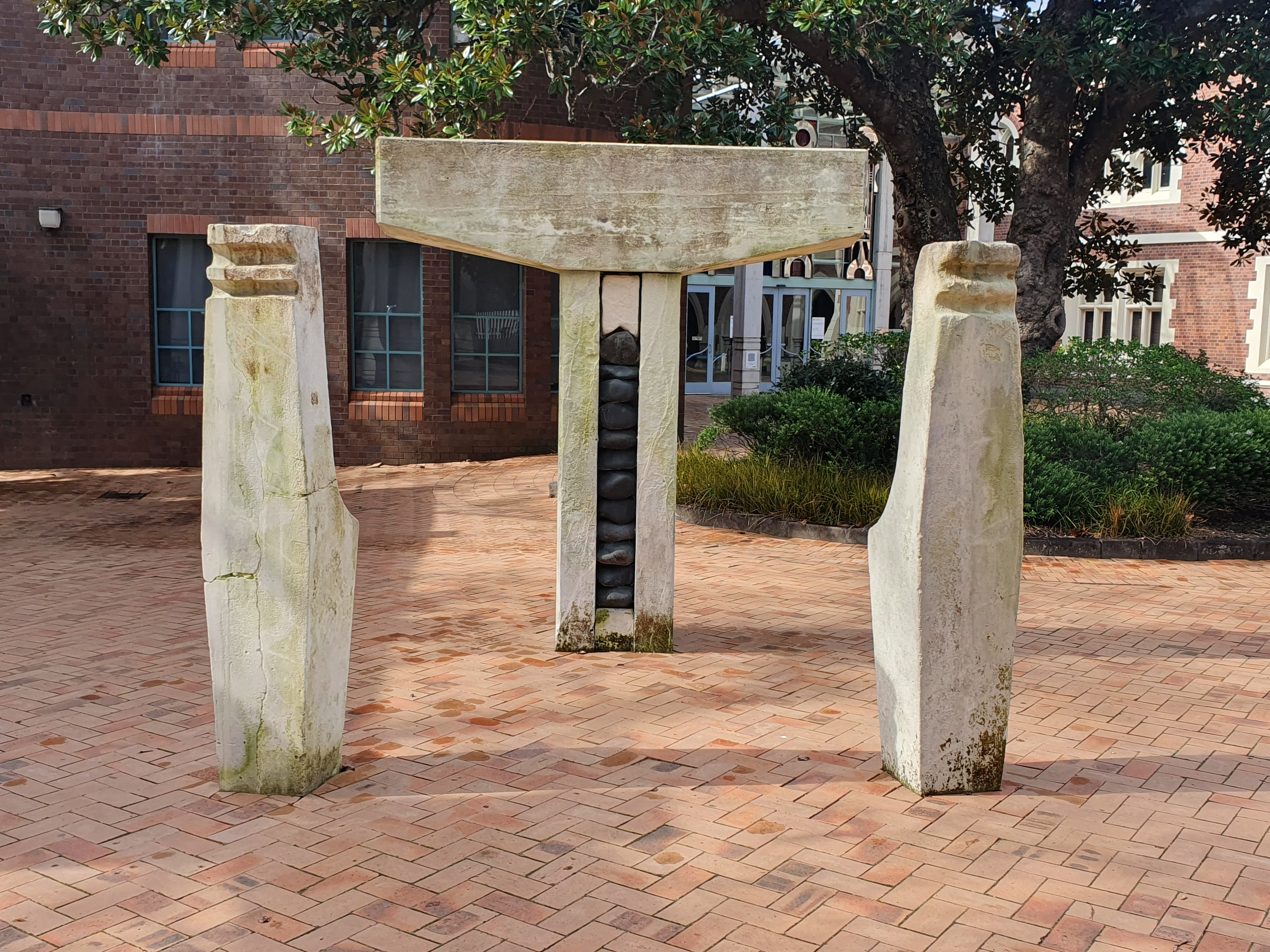
Justice (1999) by Fred Graham

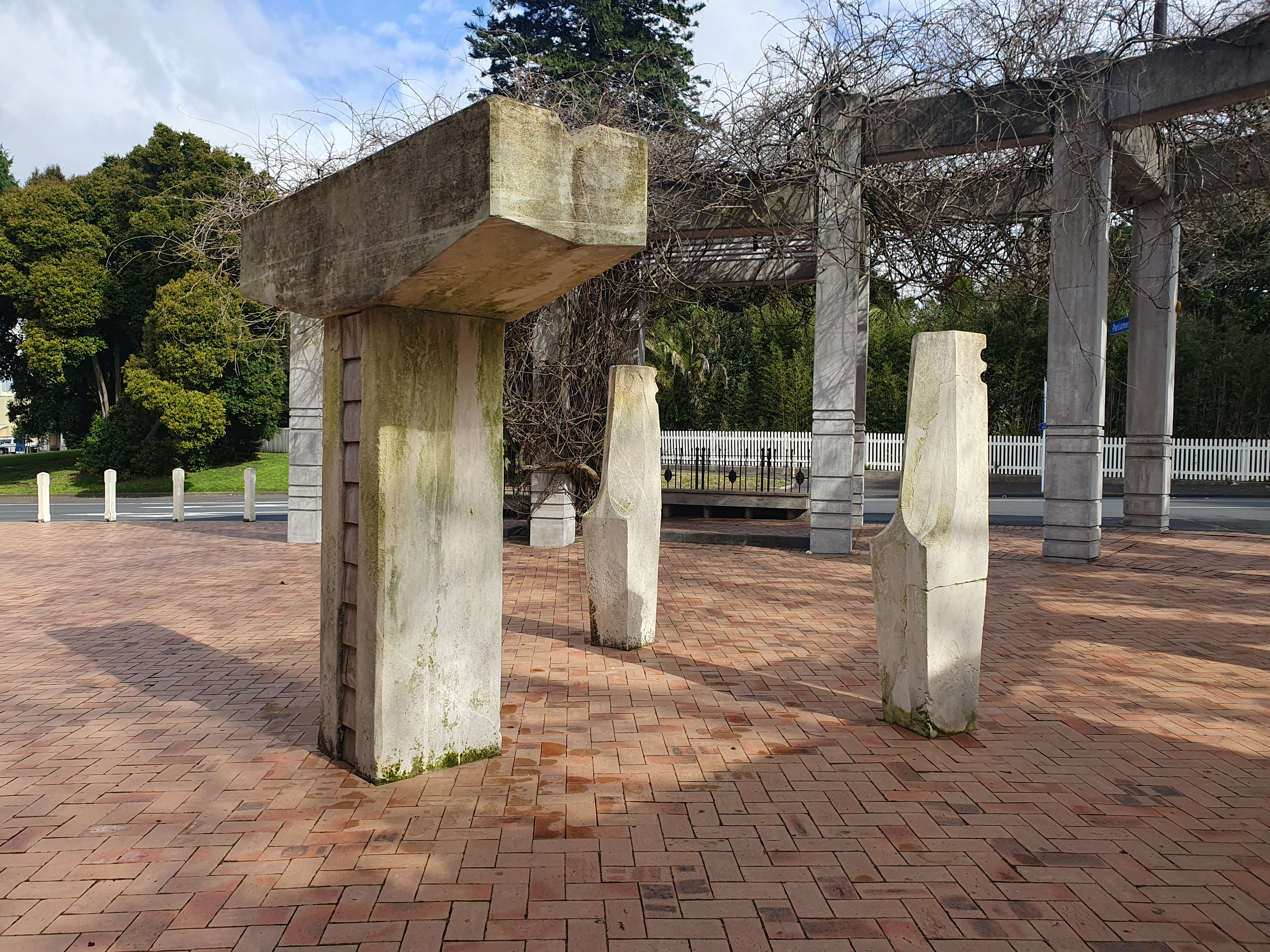
Opposite side view of Justice (1999) by Fred Graham, showing the pieces of wood
