= Anton Teutenberg =

Ferdinand Anton Nicolaus Teutenberg (4 December 1840 – 2 October 1933) was a New Zealand stonemason, carver, engraver, medallist and jeweller. He was born in Hüsten, Germany, in 1840. Teutenberg was the son of a gunsmith, who worked for Frederick William IV of Prussia. Teutenberg was taught masonry and carving techniques by his father.

When Teutenberg visited New Zealand in 1866, he worked on carvings that became part of the Auckland High Court and Pitt Street Church, after a chance meeting with architects Amos and Taylor.
