= Ironbank (Auckland) =

Mixed-use development in Auckland, New Zealand

Coordinates: 36.858283°S 174.760444°E

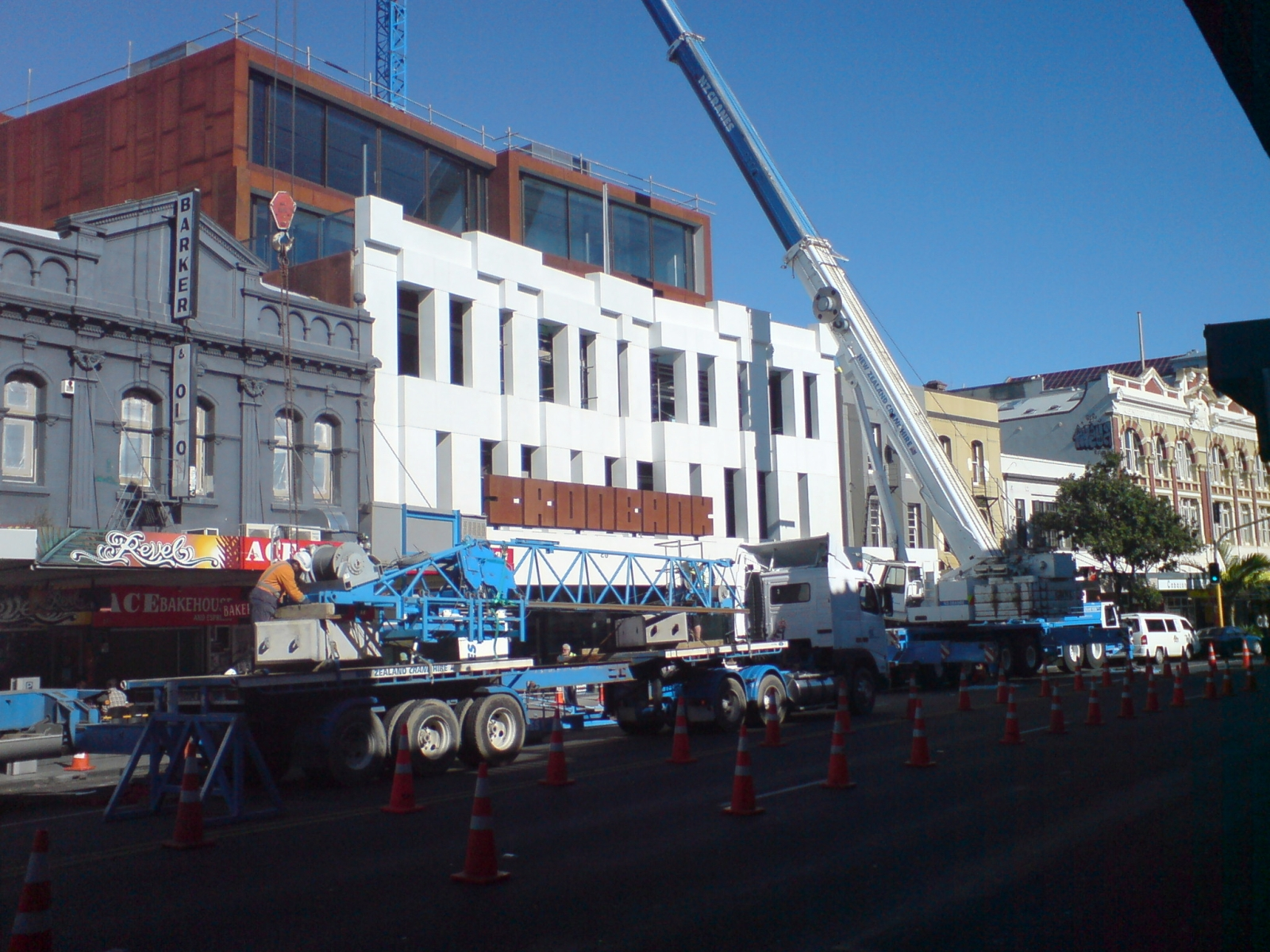
Ironbank mostly complete in mid-2009. The "container" structures are more strikingly visible from Cross Street, a parallel street behind K'Road.

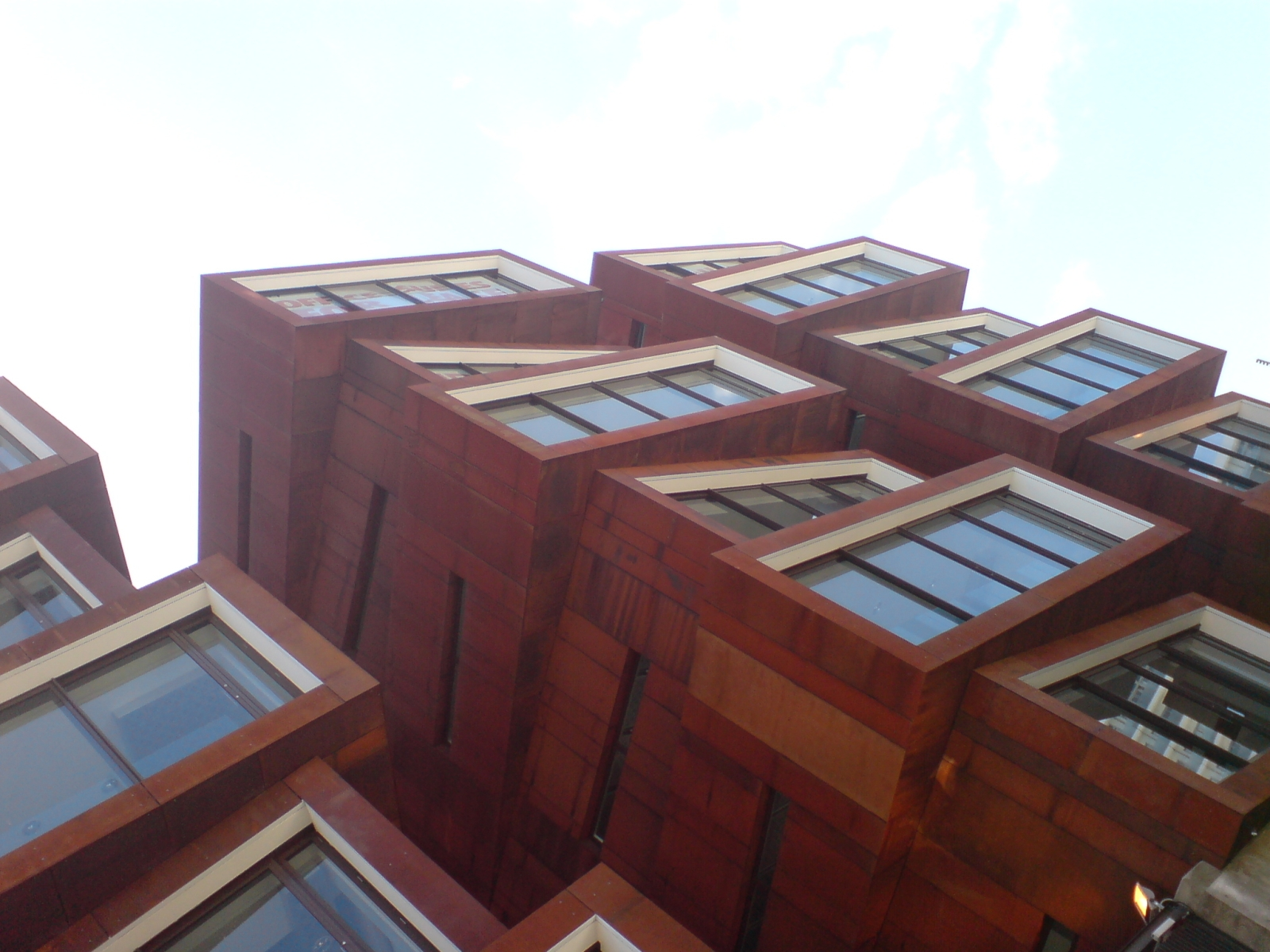
A view of the shipping container design of the south side.

Ironbank is a 4,500-m^{2}, six-level mixed-used (retail and office) development on Karangahape Road, Auckland city centre, New Zealand made of shipping containers. The building also provides a mechanical, automated car stacker for 96 cars, which the robotic system racks in a four-level storage wall. It also used a variety of environmentally friendly building facilities, such as reduced energy demands due to a design that can dispense with air conditioning.

The seven-storey building has both been criticised and lauded for looking like "rusting containers", and an architecture critic noted it reminded him of "kindergarten day in a shipping yard", calling it the "most complex and adventurous building" of RTA Studio (designed for Samson Corporation). The building is hoped to achieve 5-star Green Building certification.

In 2009, it received three architecture awards, in the "commercial", "sustainable" and "urban design" categories of the New Zealand Institute of Architects Auckland awards sponsored by the paint company Resene. It then captured second place at the World Architecture Festival, a European award, making it the best-scoring New Zealand entrant ever at the festival, and being praised for "Its sophisticated attitude to the messy urbanity of south-central Auckland".

It was also mentioned in a The New Zealand Herald series where prominent Aucklanders nominated outstanding Auckland buildings constructed since 2000. Urban designer Ludo Campbell-Reid specifically noted that the building was greater than the sum of its parts, that it would help re-invigorate Karangahape Road and its backstreets, and that unlike most buildings, it looked better from the back than from the front side.

== See also ==
- Green building in New Zealand
