= Cordis, Auckland =

Hotel in Auckland, New Zealand

Coordinates: 36°51′28″S 174°45′46″E

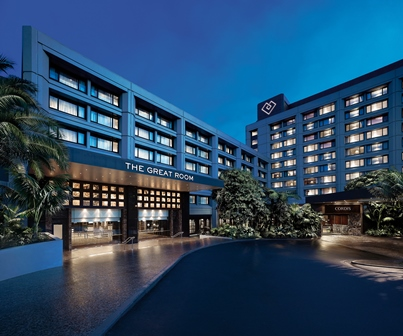
Cordis Hotel, Auckland

The Cordis Hotel, Auckland is a luxury hotel in Auckland, New Zealand. Formerly named The Langham, Auckland, it occupies the historic site of Partington's Windmill, a local landmark until its demolition in 1950.

== History ==
In May 1850, Charles Partington purchased land in Symonds Street for £200 and commenced the construction of “the new Windmill” at a cost of £2000. In August 1851 the first flour was advertised for sale. Partington, an immigrant from Oxfordshire in England, had arrived in 1847. He had previously been in partnership with John Bycroft and together they took over the Epsom Mill that stood in St Andrews Road (part of which has been renamed Windmill Road in memory of that structure which was demolished in the 1920s). The partnership lasted until December 1849.

The Symonds Street windmill was built in 1850 using bricks made on the site from clay dug nearby. In 1856 an important sideline was introduced – the baking of biscuits using equipment specially imported from Reading, Berkshire in the United Kingdom, presumably from Huntley & Palmer's who already baked biscuits there. The business was renamed the Victoria Flour Mills and Steam Biscuit Factory.

During the New Zealand wars (1861 to 1866), four firearms were always kept in the mill which was located in a strategic position on the southern edge of the Town of Auckland. As it happened Auckland was never directly threatened by the Māori at any time during the conflict. During the wars, Charles Partington served with the British cavalry and the mill supplied the troops with food, chiefly biscuits, but also flour and crushed corn.

By 1873 the biscuit-making machinery had been relocated to the Riverhead mill and at least some of the land around the Symonds Street mill had been sold off as building sites. Shops were erected along Symonds Street and houses on the other three boundary roads leaving the windmill in the centre of the block accessed by a lane called at various times Mill lane or Partington street.

Charles Partington died in 1877, apparently leaving his family affairs in disarray. His sons continued in the business and Joseph Partington took over the Symonds Street mill. In 1892 there was a Supreme Court Hearing, and a Mr Evans received title over part of the land, probably through mortgage default. In June 1895, Joseph Partington took out a 10-year lease from Evans. Two years later Evans sold his property to James Wilkinson who served Partington with notice to quit.

What followed was a series of public arguments, including the publication of a libellous pamphlet by Partington and his being declared bankrupt again. Wilkinson apparently ran into financial trouble himself as he obliged to put the property up for sale in 1910. The successful buyer was, surprisingly, Joseph Partington, who purchased the property for £400. Wilkinson was also in ill health, he died two years later.

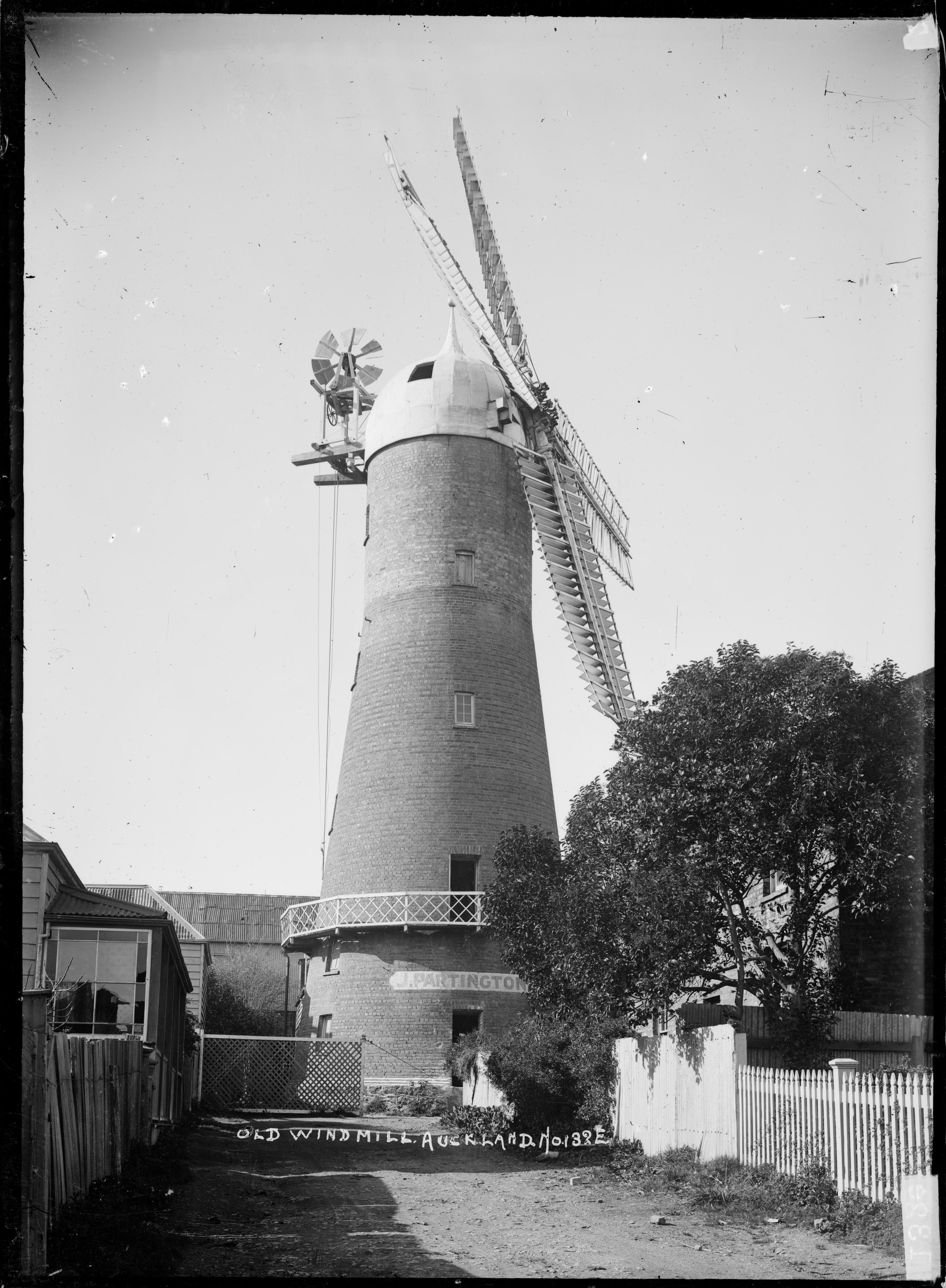
Partington's Mill, Auckland

In 1911 Joseph travelled to England and there purchased a windmill and had the machinery, stones, cap and sails shipped back to Auckland, although it appears the sails were not fitted until around 1914. A gas engine was installed to supplement wind power but by 1916 it was found necessary to add 15 feet to the height of the tower due to the increased height of the buildings now surrounding the mill.

After a turbulent history of commercial ups-and-downs, family arguments and several fires, the mill's life was effectively ended in 1941 when the then owner, Joseph Partington, died leaving no will, although he had, on more than one occasion, made public announcements that he intended to leave the property to the City Council in order to preserve it. An early advocate of health food, Partington had recently been living the life of a recluse but had kept the mill working. Because of the City Council's decision not to press any legal claim or make a deal with the family the estate was eventually sold.

Despite attempts by the Windmill Preservation Society to save the Windmill it was demolished in 1950. Although it had been promised that the 100,000 wedge-shaped bricks were to be kept safe so that the Windmill Tower could be recreated elsewhere, the bricks mysteriously vanished. Most of the machinery and other parts were destroyed; the metal turret cap was apparently melted down for scrap metal. There are Mill Stones at the Howick Historic Village and the Museum of Transport & Technology which are labelled as coming from Partington's Windmill.

In 1980 all the buildings on the block of land bounded by Symonds Street to the east, City Road to the north, Liverpool Street to the west and Karangahape Road to the south were razed. In the next six years five large buildings arose on the site. Most of the northern part of the site was devoted to the multi-story Sheraton Auckland Hotel & Towers, which incorporated a shopping arcade linking with Karangahape Road. This structure was rebranded on 1 January 2005 as the Langham Hotel, Auckland.

== Present operation ==
In 1983 the final public reception for the Royal Tour took place here for Prince Charles and Diana, Princess of Wales.

In 1990 the Auckland Gay Mardi Gras Party was held in the Ballroom – the first such event in New Zealand.

In 2001 the first Interpride Conference held in the Southern Hemisphere was opened by Prime Minister Helen Clark.

The hotel's former restaurant, Partington's, is named after the windmill founder and has won various awards, including Restaurant of the Year in 2006.

== See also ==
- Langham Hotels International
