= Ludo Campbell-Reid =

New Zealand architect

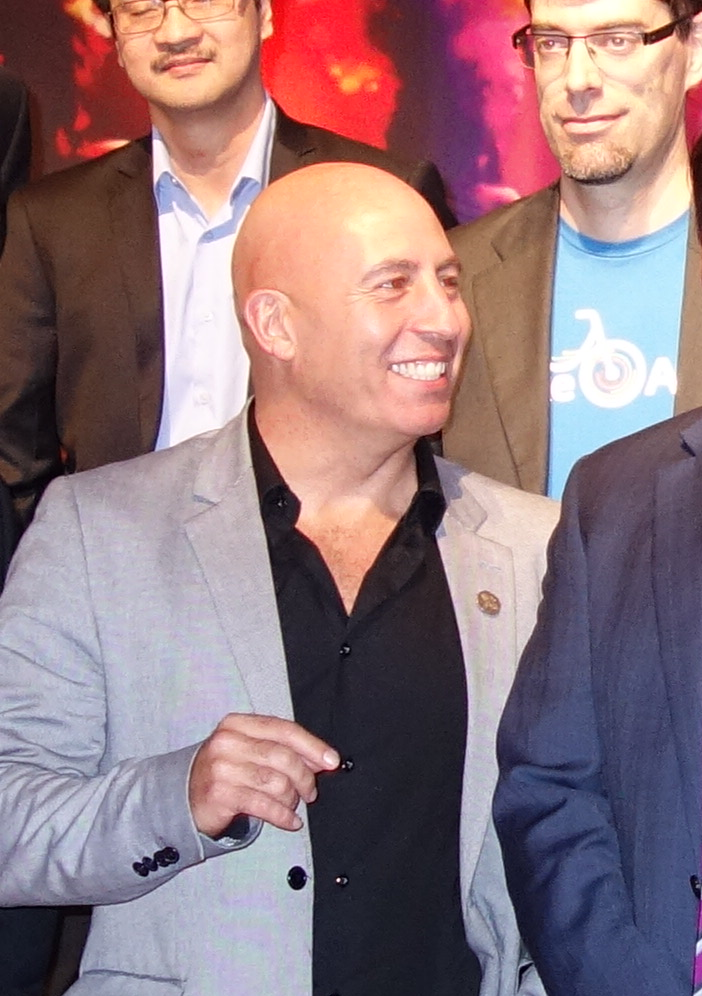
- Campbell-Reid in 2016
- Born: 1968 (age 57–58); Hampton Court, London, England
- Education: Hampton School; University of Westminster (BA); Oxford Brookes University (MA)
- Occupations: Urban designer, planner
- Years active: 1992–present
- Employer(s): City of Melbourne (current); Formerly Auckland Council, City of Wyndham, Suburban Rail Loop Authority
- Known for: Auckland Council Design Champion (2006–2019)

Ludo Campbell-Reid is an urban designer and a former competitive rower. He is most well known for being Auckland City's first "urban design champion."

== Early life ==
Campbell-Reid was born to an English father and a South African mother in Hampton Court, southwest London, in 1968. He was educated at Hampton School. He graduated from the University of Westminster in London with a BA with Honours in urban planning studies, then completed a MA and Diploma in urban design at Oxford Brookes University.

== Rowing ==
Campbell-Reid represented Great Britain at the 1986 World Rowing Junior Championships in Račice, Czechoslovakia. He also designed rowing boats for a short time, including the boat used by Steve Redgrave to win his fifth gold medal at the 2000 Sydney Olympics.

== Career ==
Cambell-Reid has been described as "equal parts planner, preacher and snake oil peddler" and in an interview from 2017 suggests that his main role is as an advisor convincing decision makers that "good design matters."

=== Early career ===
Campbell-Reid's urban design career began working on Cape Town's bid to host the 2004 Olympic Games and South Africa's first ski resort before moving back to London in 1997, working briefly at Tibbalds Planning & Urban Design, Tower Hamlets Borough in east London, and designing yachts.

Campbell-Reid moved to Auckland in 2005, and was appointed the City Council's first ever Design Champion in 2006. Cambell-Reid had several success over a decade while part of the Auckland Council.

=== Notable Auckland projects ===
In 2012, he and his team delivered the council's first City Centre Masterplan in 2012. In his role, Campbell-Reid says his focus was to put "people first" with the creation of shared spaces in the city, including the redevelopment of Wynyard and Britomart, the 2015 redevelopment of Fort Street, and the Lightpath – Te Ara I Whiti project.

In 2018, he was the architect of Auckland Council's "Access for Everyone" plan, from which the council's planning committee unanimously supported a trial to pedestrianize parts of the central city. Some of his projects attracted controversy, including criticism from mayoral candidate John Tamihere in 2019.

=== Post Auckland ===
Ludo Campbell-Reid resigned from Auckland Council in October 2019, and went to the City of Wyndham in early 2020, where he was for two years. Afterwards, he was at the Suburban Rail Loop Authority for two years, before joining the executive leadership team at the City of Melbourne.
