= Pitt Street Church =

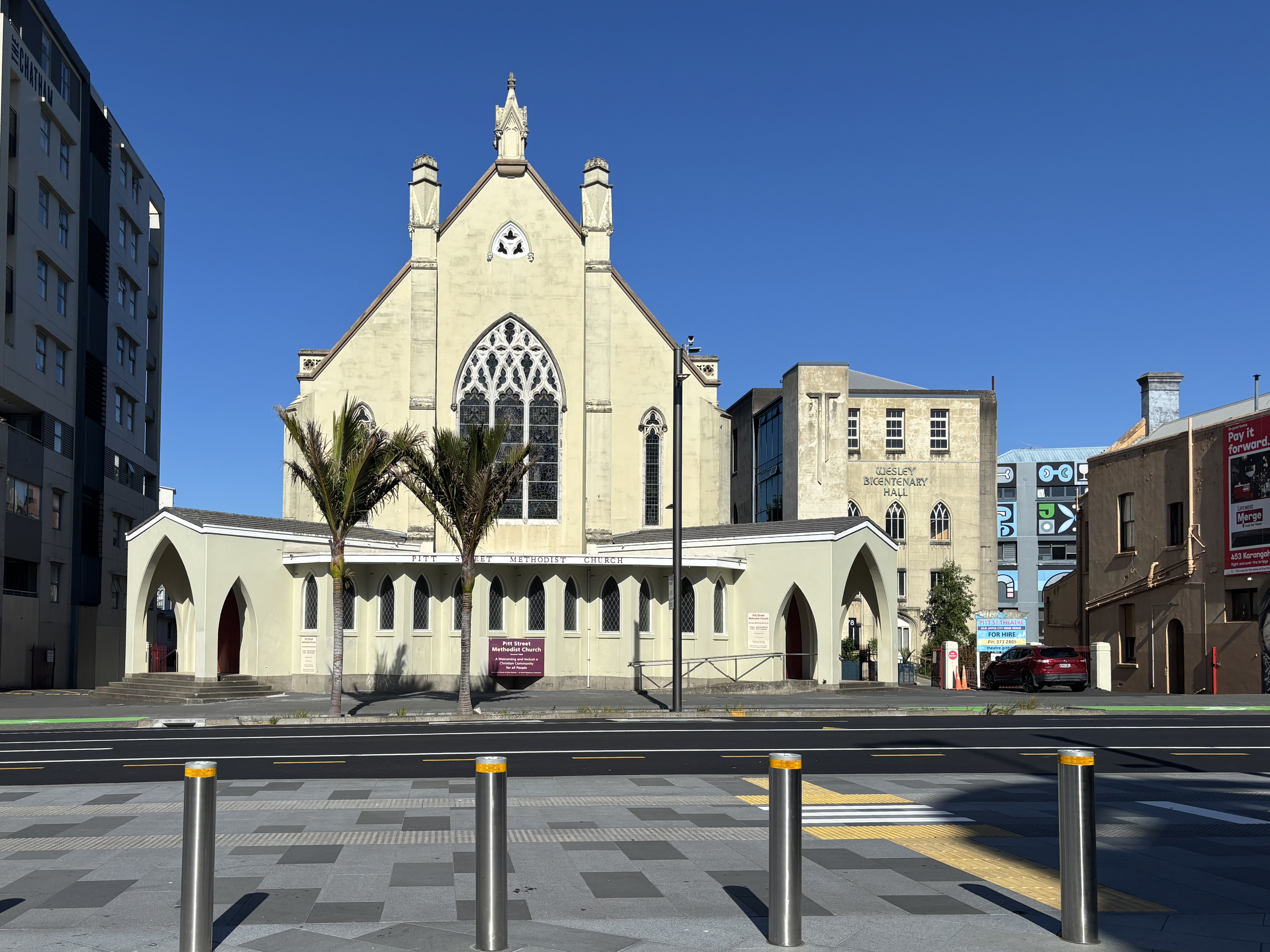
- Pitt Street Church in 2025
- Pitt Street Church
- 36°51′26″S 174°45′34″E
- Location: Pitt Street, Newton, Auckland
- Address: 78 Pitt Street
- Country: New Zealand
- Denomination: Methodist
- Website: www.methodistcentral.org.nz

History
- Founded: 1866

Architecture
- Functional status: Active
- Architect: Philip Herapath
- Architectural type: Church
- Style: Gothic Revival
- Years built: 1865–1866
- Construction cost: £11,000

Heritage New Zealand – Category 2
- Designated: 24 June 2005
- Reference no.: 626

Pitt Street Church is a 19th-century Methodist church located in Newton, Auckland, New Zealand. Built in 1865–1866, it is listed as a Category 2 building by Heritage New Zealand. The church was designed by Philip Herapath and included sculpture work by Anton Teutenberg.

== Description ==
The Pitt Street Church was designed by Philip Herapath, an Englishman who had emigrated to Auckland in 1857 and within six years had established himself in the city as an architect. It was built in the Gothic Revival style with upper walls of brick (since 1911 coated with cement stucco) and its lower walls composed of volcanic basalt derived from local sources. Five bays in length, the building is provided with an angled buttress at each corner. The frontage facing Pitt Street was constructed with two buttresses, topped off with masonry towers, and included ornamental stone carvings by Anton Teutenberg sculpted from sandstone imported from Australia. Roofed with slate, the ceiling is a barrel-vaulted structure of curved timber beams supported on stone corbels (also by Teuteonberg) depicting native foliage and flowers. The building has been expanded since it was first built; it was extended to eight bays in 1886 and a front vestibule added in 1962 to the designs of the architect Milton Annabell who also oversaw the modernisation of the interior.

== History ==
The Wesleyan Methodist Church had a presence in Auckland since 1841, with churches being built in High Street and later in Hobson Street. By the 1860s, a more prominent building was desired. The site of Pitt Street Church was purchased by the Wesleyan Methodist Church in 1864 and the foundation stone laid in November 1865. By the time it was completed the following year, it had cost £11,000, much higher than anticipated. It was first used on 14 October 1866 and within ten years had become the primary church for the Methodists in the northern region of New Zealand. Prominent in its early leadership was a Wesleyan missionary; the first minister of Pitt Street Church was James Buller, who had worked in the Māngungu Mission in the Hokianga. John Hobbs, who had led the Māngungu Mission earlier in his career, was a parishioner before his death in 1883. His funeral service was held in the church.

The congregation of Pitt Street Church expanded as the population in Auckland grew and by the 1880s, included many notable Auckland businessmen such as William Wilson, the owner of the New Zealand Herald newspaper, and George Winstone, who operated a transport company. At this time, the church was leading outreach initiatives and supporting the construction of Wesleyan chapels in the region. Pitt Street Church remains active and in recent years has developed a strong following with the local Samoan, Tongan and Korean communities.

== Legacy ==
Heritage New Zealand listed Pitt Street Church as a Historic Place Category 2 place on 24 June 2005, with a list number of 626. The church is notable for its importance to the history of the Methodist community in Auckland, its role as a place of worship in early Auckland, and its connections to early Wesleyan missionaries. There are a number of memorial plaques in the church to early Weslyan missionaries in New Zealand, including some transferred from earlier Methodist churches in Auckland.
