= Green fairy =

Green fairy may refer to:

- Absinthe, an alcoholic beverage
- The Green Fairy Book (1892) in the series Lang's Fairy Books
- Fern the Green Fairy, one of the Rainbow Fairies in the Rainbow Magic books
- Green fairy (cannabis), a person who supplies medical cannabis illegally in New Zealand
