= The Grampians (New Zealand) =

Suburb and hills of Nelson, New Zealand

- Suburb
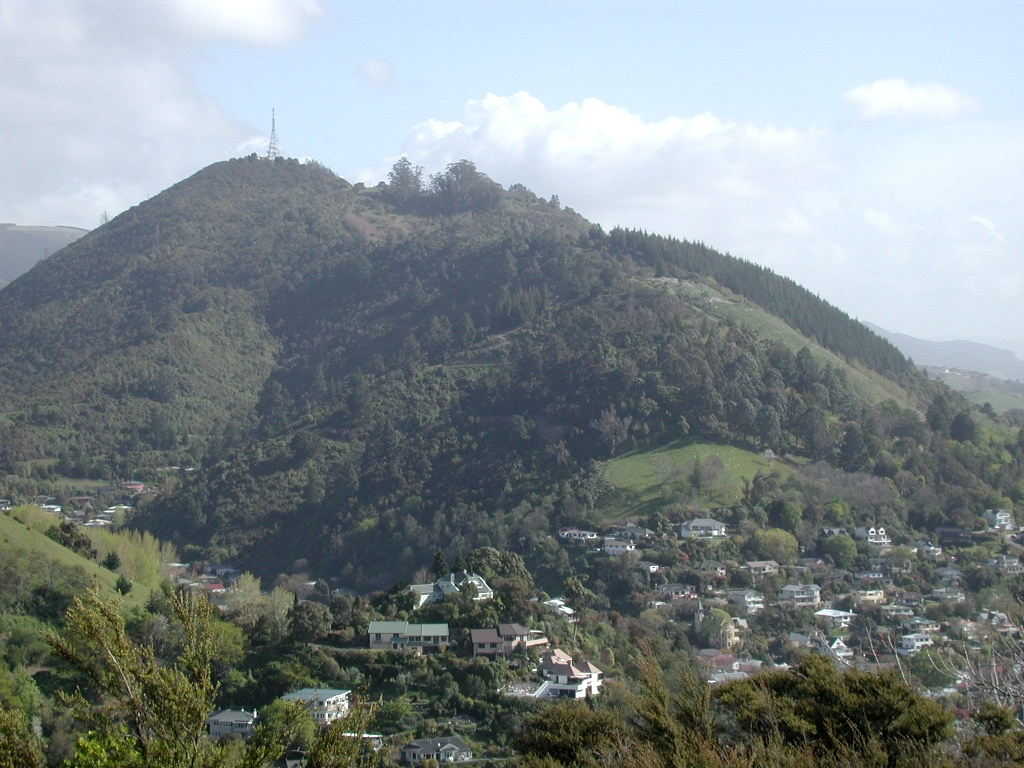
- The Grampians viewed from Botanical Hill
- Interactive map of The Grampians
- Coordinates: 41.2980°S 173.2796°E
- Country: New Zealand
- Region: Nelson
- Ward: Central General Ward; Whakatū Māori Ward
- Electorates: Nelson; Te Tai Tonga (Māori)

Government
  - Territorial Authority: Nelson City Council
  - Nelson City Mayor: Nick Smith
  - Nelson MP: Rachel Boyack
  - Te Tai Tonga MP: Tākuta Ferris

Area
  - Total: 2.95 km^{2} (1.14 sq mi)

Population (June 2025)
  - Total: 2,710
  - Density: 919/km^{2} (2,380/sq mi)
- Time zone: UTC+12 (NZST)
  - Summer (DST): UTC+13 (NZDT)
- Postcode: 7010
- Area code: 03

The Grampians are a set of prominent hills forming the southeast backdrop of Nelson, New Zealand, reaching 390 metres (1,280 ft) high.

Frequented by locals and tourists alike, the Grampians are covered in a myriad of tracks ranging from leisurely strolls to relatively taxing steep inclines.

Entry points to this recreational area are from

- The top of Collingwood Street
- The corner of Van Diemen and Trafalgar streets
- Market Road, Bishopdale

A television and FM radio transmitter sits atop the hills. The transmitter was commissioned in 1971 by the New Zealand Broadcasting Corporation to broadcast NZBC TV (now TVNZ 1), offering improved coverage to Nelson and Tasman compared to the existing private translators relaying the NZBC TV signal from the Mount Kaukau transmitter in Wellington.

Several community and volunteer groups are working towards restoring habitats for native birds on the Grampians by reducing the impact of predators, using pest control methods in conjunction with the Brook Waimarama Sanctuary.

== Areas of interest ==
The main track zigzags up to the ridge of the hills, providing access to good views over most of Nelson. A lookout near the top offers views over much of the Nelson region.

== Demographics ==
Grampians statistical area, which includes Bishopdale, covers 2.95 km^{2} (1.14 sq mi), had an estimated population of 2,710 as of June 2025, with a population density of 919 people per km^{2}.

Historical population
| Year | Pop. | ±% p.a. |
|---|---|---|
| 2006 | 1,941 | — |
| 2013 | 2,235 | +2.04% |
| 2018 | 2,412 | +1.54% |
| 2023 | 2,538 | +1.02% |

Grampians had a population of 2,538 in the 2023 New Zealand census, an increase of 126 people (5.2%) since the 2018 census, and an increase of 303 people (13.6%) since the 2013 census. There were 1,275 males, 1,251 females, and 12 people of other genders in 906 dwellings. 4.0% of people identified as LGBTIQ+. The median age was 39.7 years (compared with 38.1 years nationally). There were 444 people (17.5%) aged under 15 years, 423 (16.7%) aged 15 to 29, 1,281 (50.5%) aged 30 to 64, and 387 (15.2%) aged 65 or older.

People could identify as more than one ethnicity. The results were 74.8% European (Pākehā); 15.6% Māori; 3.3% Pasifika; 13.9% Asian; 2.2% Middle Eastern, Latin American and African New Zealanders (MELAA); and 3.3% other, which includes people giving their ethnicity as "New Zealander". English was spoken by 94.9%, Māori by 4.0%, Samoan by 0.5%, and other languages by 16.4%. No language could be spoken by 2.5% (e.g. too young to talk). New Zealand Sign Language was known by 0.8%. The percentage of people born overseas was 29.1, compared with 28.8% nationally.

Religious affiliations were 28.6% Christian, 1.9% Hindu, 0.9% Islam, 0.1% Māori religious beliefs, 1.4% Buddhist, 1.3% New Age, 0.1% Jewish, and 2.4% other religions. People who answered that they had no religion were 54.3%, and 9.2% of people did not answer the census question.

Of those at least 15 years old, 549 (26.2%) people had a bachelor's or higher degree, 975 (46.6%) had a post-high school certificate or diploma, and 567 (27.1%) people exclusively held high school qualifications. The median income was $37,700, compared with $41,500 nationally. 165 people (7.9%) earned over $100,000 compared to 12.1% nationally. The employment status of those at least 15 was 1,029 (49.1%) full-time, 282 (13.5%) part-time, and 75 (3.6%) unemployed.
