= Sue Grey (lawyer) =

New Zealand lawyer and anti-vaccination conspiracy activist

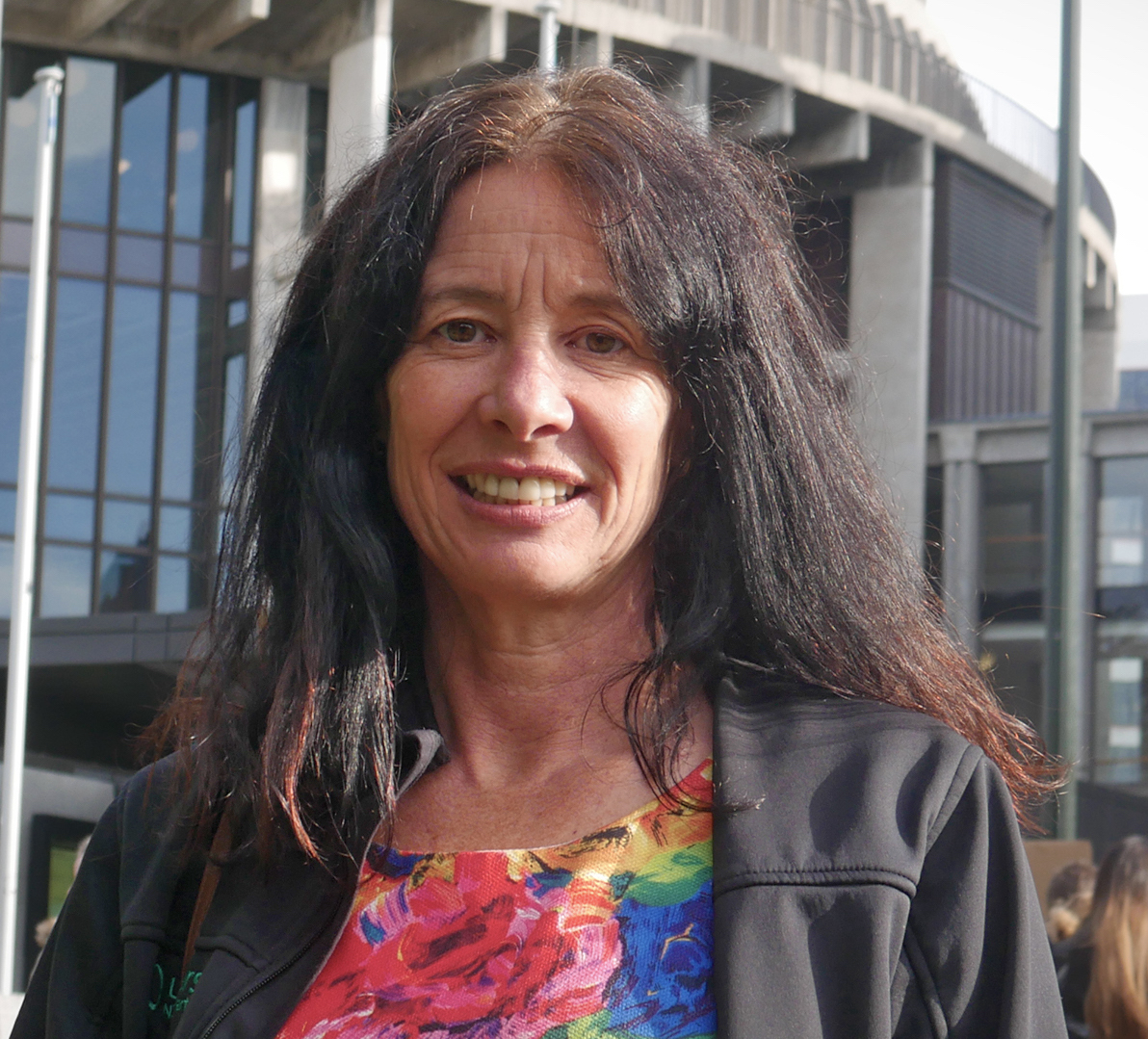

Leader of the NZ Outdoors & Freedom Party
- Incumbent
- Assumed office December 2019 Serving with Donna Pokere-Phillips (2022–2025); Alan Simmons (2015–2022)
- Preceded by: David Haynes

Co-leader of Freedoms New Zealand
- In office c. May 2023 – c. May 2025 Serving with Brian Tamaki

Personal details
- Born: 1962 or 1963 (age 62–63)
- Occupation: Lawyer
- Known for: Anti-1080, cannabis legalisation, anti-vaccination
- Website: suegrey.co.nz

Susan Jane Grey is a political figure, conspiracy theorist, and environmental lawyer in Nelson, New Zealand. She is the leader of the NZ Outdoors & Freedom Party and also served as a co-leader of Freedoms NZ. She is known for promoting medicinal cannabis rights and opposing COVID-19 vaccination, 5G technology, and the use of 1080, frequently sharing misinformation on social media about the effectiveness of COVID vaccination.

== Education and early career ==
Grey has law and science degrees, the latter majoring in microbiology and biochemistry. She also holds a Royal Society of Health Diploma.

Grey was admitted to the bar in Auckland on 1 October 1990. After being a partner in MS Sullivan and Associates, she became a self-employed lawyer based in Nelson.

== Career ==
In a 2003 investigation by the Ministry of Fisheries into corruption in the scampi industry, Grey was appearing before the select committee representing fisheries company Barine Development. Grey began a relationship with Green Party MP Ian Ewen-Street, a member of the select committee, who at that time was separated from his wife. Both Grey and Ewen-Street were obliged to step down from the investigation; ACT leader Richard Prebble claimed that by having an affair they had "made a mockery of the enquiry". The couple had a child named Ysabella together, but later split.

In 2008, Grey represented a group of wool growers in a High Court case against the Wool Board, known as the Saxmere Case. After losing the case on appeal, it was revealed that the Wool Board's counsel was joint owner of a racehorse stud with one of the three judges. Grey argued in the Supreme Court that because of this conflict of interest the judge should have excused himself from the case, or disclosed the relationship in open court. The case grew to involve Attorney-General Michael Cullen, by which time Grey was working as a lawyer for the Department of Conservation. The Director-General of the department, Al Morrison, claimed her role in the Saxmere Case was in conflict with her work for DOC and fired her. In 2010 Justice Bill Wilson resigned over his part in the affair.

== Brook Valley Community Group ==
The Brook Waimārama Sanctuary near Nelson had planned three aerial drops of 26.5 tonnes of brodifacoum-laced bait from July to October 2017 to eliminate all rodents within its predator-proof fence. This action was challenged in June by a group calling themselves the Brook Valley Community Group (BVCG), with Sue Grey as their lawyer and spokesperson, protesting the aerial poison drop near a waterway. Although portraying themselves as a community group, many of the organisers were anti-1080 activists from outside Nelson. The drop was halted while Grey took the case to the High Court on 7 August, and then, two days before the first drop, to the Court of Appeal; in both cases the court ruled against the BVCG. Nelson MP Nick Smith was accosted on 3 September 2017 (the day of the first drop) by two protesters who abused him, rubbed rat poison in his face, and threatened to poison his family. That same day, a hole was drilled in a fuel tank for helicopters performing the drop, several protesters attempted to block access, and three were arrested. Also on the day of the drop, several BVCG activists claimed on Facebook that they were being poisoned; Grey stated that her "exposed skin was red and burning", and asked her supporters "If my health suddenly deteriorates please can someone make sure that I get an urgent injection of Vitamin K."

The three poison drops subsequently went ahead, and no bait was dropped outside the sanctuary boundaries, nor was any trace of brodifacoum detected in the stream water. Grey defended the protestors who abused Nick Smith in court, but they were found guilty of offensive behaviour and fined.

Grey attempted to take the BVCG's appeal to the Supreme Court, but was denied – a decision Grey called "unbelievable" – and the group ordered to pay over $70,000 in legal costs to the Nelson City Council, the Minister for the Environment, and the Brook Waimārama Sanctuary Trust. The BVCG considered disbanding as an incorporated society to avoid having to pay the costs and "starting again somewhere else". After attempting to recover some of the $100,000 it had spent responding to the BVCG's legal action, the Nelson City Council applied in 2020 for the group to be liquidated.

== Anti-1080 activism ==
In October 2017, at an anti-1080 planning meeting near Nelson, Grey gave a presentation outlining a new strategy for protesting the use of 1080. She suggested activists flood the comments section of news stories and blogs with objections to 1080, even stories that had nothing to do with the poison. In the months following, this strategy was implemented in the live streams of every major NZ news organisation, where news stories on any subject were spammed and overwhelmed by "Ban 1080" messages coordinated by the Facebook group Operation Ban 1080.

In September 2018, Grey represented the community conservation organisation Friends of Sherwood Trust and took the Department of Conservation and Auckland Council to the Environment Court, in an attempt to stop the dropping of 1080 poison over 30,000 ha of the Hunua Ranges. This was a follow-up to a successful drop in 2015, intended to reduce numbers of predators and protect an endangered kōkako population. Grey argued that dropping 1080 onto the ranges would threaten Auckland's water supply and was in breach of the Resource Management Act. On 14 September she won a temporary injunction to stop the drop, but lost the case, with the court stating "We are not persuaded that there is likely to be serious harm to the environment if the proposed application proceeds." She did not appeal the decision, and the drop went ahead in September and October. The Trust then in December put forward an application to prevent the drop, even though it had already occurred, and later withdrew it. DOC and Auckland Council claimed Grey's arguments were "without substance" and the Trust's case was "poorly presented". They were ordered by the court to pay over $40,000 in legal fees, a portion of the costs incurred by the Council and DOC, and an additional $5000 to each of them for the withdrawn application. The Council attempted several times to claim its portion of the amount owed, nearly $28,000, and in February 2021 put the Trust into liquidation. After the poison drop, pest numbers were reported to be at their "lowest ever" levels and the number of breeding pairs of kōkako doubled from 55 to 116 breeding pairs.

Journalist Dave Hansford who followed Grey's efforts to oppose 1080 has labelled her "an opportunistic lawyer with an elastic understanding of science." He wrote:

"Since 1080, she has branched out into every conceivable conspiracy theory there is, but she tends to specialise in the most lucrative. This seems to be the essence of her business model."

== Medicinal cannabis ==
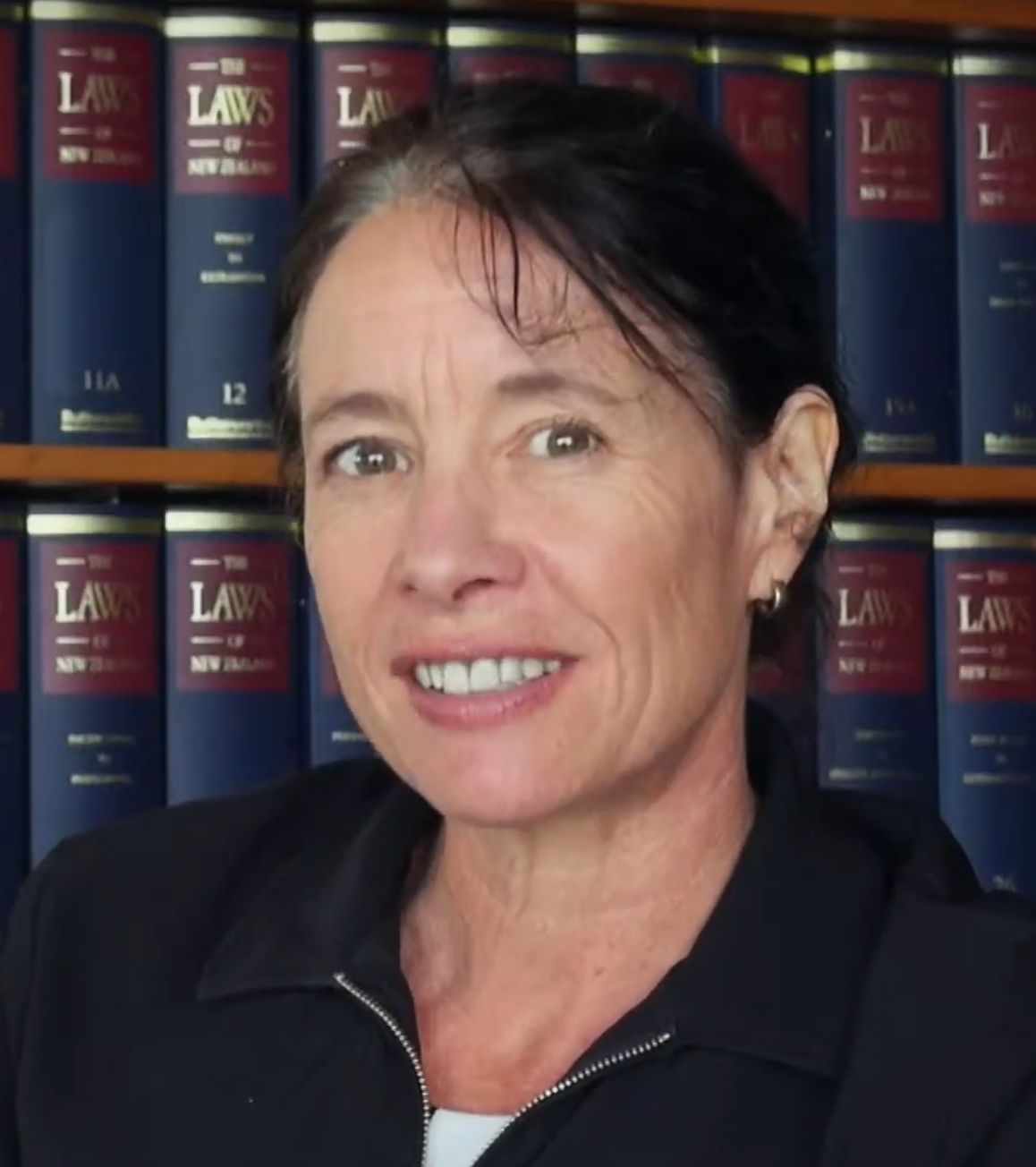
Grey in the 2019 cannabis documentary DRUGLAWED 2

Rose Renton was one of the two protestors who had accosted Nick Smith on the day of the Brook Waimārama poison drop and rubbed rat poison in his face. When police visited her house afterwards they noticed her cannabis plants, which she cultivated to provide CBD for local patients. Renton had become an advocate for medicinal cannabis after cannabis oil was used to treat her son, who died in 2015 after experiencing three months of seizures. Grey represented Renton, who had initially pleaded guilty in November 2018 on charges of cultivating, possessing, processing and supplying cannabis. In February 2019 she was discharged without conviction; the judge said her offending was "altruistic" in nature. Grey continued to represent "green fairies" – people growing medicinal cannabis for themselves or their friends and family – and many of her clients were discharged without conviction.

== 5G views ==
Grey is an opponent of 5G technology, and during 2020 embarked on a tour of New Zealand to raise awareness of what she claims are its dangers, saying the mobile technology is both a human rights and health issue. She maintains that telecommunications companies are responsible for releasing radiation into the community without adequate consultation, and encouraged people to petition their local MPs and councils. Grey, who has a Bachelor of Science degree, claims that some people are hypersensitive to the effects of 5G and even if "it's a psychological or nocebo effect – that's still an effect…that needs to be protected against."

== COVID-19 views ==
Grey became associated with the resistance to COVID vaccination and elimination in New Zealand. She has criticised the government response to the COVID-19 pandemic, claiming that New Zealand's work eliminating community transmission of the virus for over a year was "over-vigorous", "increasingly draconian", and "out of control". She did not observe some lockdown rules, going paddle-boarding during alert level 4, saying "let's break out of the fear and cotton wool mentality where we are locked inside buildings like frightened mice." Grey describes her opposition to vaccination as "pro-choice", but has compared it to "rape and murder" on her social media, and described the extension of vaccination to 12–17-year-olds as "government-mandated genocide". She regularly shares misinformation about COVID-19 and inflates the number of deaths linked to vaccination. Grey has been assisted in her anti-vaccination organisation by former white supremacist Kyle Chapman, who distributed 5000 anti-vax leaflets around Christchurch; she later advised Chapman when he was arrested on firearms and ammunition charges.

Grey spread COVID-related disinformation on social media which triggered complaints to the New Zealand Law Society and a series of bans from Facebook. Those bans were for three days in September 2021, then in November another seven days after Grey linked a death to the COVID vaccine. In February 2022, she was banned for a further 30 days.

=== Opposition to COVID-19 vaccination ===
Grey was part of a legal action by the group Ngā Kaitiaki Tuku Iho Inc against Prime Minister Jacinda Ardern, the Minister of Health, the director-general of health and others in the High Court. In May 2021 they challenged the legality of the New Zealand vaccination programme, claiming it was not justified by Section 23 of the Medicines Act, a commonly-invoked provision enabling the Minister of Health to approve medicines for a "limited number of patients". The group claimed there was no need for a vaccine rollout, as New Zealand's lockdown had been so successful at reducing spread of the virus. Grey claimed people had not been informed of the "risks" of vaccination, saying, "there's no evidence that they've been given any other alternatives – it's all 'vaccine, vaccine, vaccine'." The judge called Section 23 into question, saying it was an "arguable point" whether a "limited number of patients" could include all New Zealanders aged 16 or over. The Government agreed to reform this part of the law through the Therapeutic Products Bill to be introduced later in 2021, and introduced immediate legislation to allow the vaccination programme to continue.

In October 2021, about 100 lockdown protestors in 50 vehicles calling themselves the "Sovereign Hīkoi of Truth" attempted to breach Auckland's border restrictions en route to Waitangi, where they were to be addressed by Sue Grey. The convoy was stopped by police at Mercer, south of Auckland. The group was labelled "Pākehā anti-vaxxers" by Hone Harawira, and told they were not welcome on the Waitangi Treaty Grounds. Grey was already at Waitangi, having flown to nearby Kerikeri the day before in a private plane. She said it seemed "so unfair that if you could afford to fly on a plane from Wellington you could get there, but there was no route for those who wanted to drive."

At the time, Grey was representing four Christchurch airport security officers in the High Court, who had lost their jobs after refusing the vaccination mandated for border workers. In court, Grey claimed, "We've got people that test positive that don't have symptoms. It seems to be an art more than a science, perhaps you could say it like that." The judge retorted, "I think I can safely assume COVID exists, can't I?" Grey lost the case, with the court rejecting her argument that the order was unlawful, and reiterating that the vaccine was safe and effective and the rights of the workers was not being infringed.

Disinformation researcher Kate Hannah claimed Grey is "a key figure in New Zealand's disinformation network" in relation to COVID-19. Hannah stated:

''[Grey] has status as a lawyer; people expect her to be rigorous, thoughtful, trustworthy, clever. When she speaks about something she has a higher predictable impact than when Joe Bloggs speaks.…What motivates Sue Grey to tell you these things? Is she asking you to donate? Yes."

=== Baby W case ===
In late November 2022, Grey represented two parents who objected to the use of blood from COVID-19 vaccinated people in their infant son's ("Baby W") heart surgery. Health New Zealand has sought legal guardianship of "Baby W". The initial hearing was heard on 30 November with the full urgent hearing scheduled for 6 December 2022. In two radio interviews about the case, Grey falsely claimed blood from vaccinated donors contained "inflammatory factors" and was unsafe. Doctors and the national blood bank New Zealand Blood Service pointed out this was incorrect, and that a COVID-19 vaccination is broken down quickly after injection, with all donor blood being filtered before use. A group called "Liveblood" stated in response to the ruling that they were "working tirelessly" for New Zealanders to have the "safest, freshest, best directed donor blood".

On 7 December, Justice Ian Gault of the Auckland High Court placed Baby W under the guardianship of the court. He appointed two doctors as agents of the court to provide consent for surgery, allowing the surgery to go ahead, while Baby W's parents retained guardianship on non-medical matters. On 8 December, Grey initially confirmed that the parents would not be appealing the Judge's decision to hand over guardianship of Baby W, citing the urgent medical needs of the baby. After the parents obstructed medical personnel trying to prepare Baby W for heart surgery, Gault issued an emergency allowing Police to use "reasonable force" to enforce the Court's ruling. On 9 December, Grey confirmed that Baby W had undergone a successful heart surgery operation and was recovering well. The following day, Grey and the parents stated that they would continue challenging the Court's decision through the legal system.

In two 2022 interviews about the case Grey used the baby's name, which was suppressed, a total of six times. One interview was livestreamed by Liz Gunn, who also named the parents. In a decision released in 2025 the New Zealand Lawyers and Conveyancers Disciplinary Tribunal found that although Grey's mistake wasn't deliberate it still amounted to unsatisfactory (but not disgraceful or dishonourable) conduct. She was ordered to pay $14,190 in costs.

== Political career ==
In December 2019, Grey was elected co-leader of the New Zealand Outdoors Party (now known as the NZ Outdoors & Freedom Party). She found support among new party members who had come from the recently deregistered Ban 1080 Party, which had received around 0.1% of the party vote in 2014 and 2017.

=== 2020 general election ===
Throughout 2020, including during the general election, Grey and her party were staunch opponents of the Government's response to the COVID-19 pandemic (see COVID-19 views above) and become part of a loose, fractious "freedom" movement which often staged protests across the country. Grey claimed that in April 2020 she had been approached by prominent conspiracy theorist Billy Te Kahika, who wanted to "take over" the Outdoors Party, leaving Grey as deputy leader but firing the board and candidates and rebranding as what Grey called "Billy's People's Party". Instead, Te Kahika founded the New Zealand Public Party in June and merged it with Jami-Lee Ross's Advance New Zealand party in July. Grey and Outdoors Party co-leader Alan Simmons met Te Kahika and Ross in Auckland that month, but turned down another offer to cooperate. As a result of their refusal, Grey claimed that she and Simmons were the subject of a "nasty social media and email campaign" by supporters of Te Kahika, who in turn claimed "the worst and the filthiest behaviour has actually come from Outdoors Party supporters towards us."

As a Nelson electorate candidate in 2020 Grey received 679 votes, finishing 6th. Labour's Rachel Boyack won, unseating incumbent National MP Nick Smith. Grey had said that it was "time for a change" after Smith's two decades as Nelson's MP. Nationally, the Outdoors Party won 3,256 party votes, slightly over twice its 2017 result and around 0.1% of the total.

=== 2022 and 2023 elections ===
Grey contested the 2022 Tauranga by-election for the renamed NZ Outdoors & Freedom Party. She moved to Tauranga for the election. During the campaign Grey attempted to join the three main candidates onstage at a debate at the University of Waikato, but was prevented by security. She attempted to live-stream the closed event until she was asked to leave. A supporter of Grey's said he would burn his New Zealand flag. With 1030 of 20,784 votes (4.7%) Grey came fourth, losing to Sam Uffindell.

In May 2023 Sue Grey's party joined the Freedoms NZ umbrella party and she became a co-leader alongside Brian Tamaki. She was counted as a "list only candidate" (ranked #2) for Freedoms NZ, which received 0.33% of the party vote, and finished seventh in the West Coast-Tasman as the Outdoors & Freedom Party candidate.

=== 2026 general election ===
During the 2026 New Zealand general election, Grey stood as leader of the Outdoors & Freedom Party, ranking first on the party list. She also contested the West Coast-Tasman electorate.

On 7 November, Grey came sixth place in the West Coast-Tasman race, gaining 1,341 votes based on preliminary results. The Outdoors & Freedom Party won 2,685 votes or 0.11% of the party vote based on preliminary results; below the five percent threshold needed to enter Parliament.

== Investigation by Law Society ==
In 2021 the New Zealand Law Society received multiple formal complaints against Grey. One, laid in May by a member of the public, referred to Grey's use of social media to share disinformation, call for hangings, and refer to PM Jacinda Ardern as "the poisoner". Other similar complaints were made at the time. In September, Grey claimed via social media that the death of an Auckland teenager from a heart condition was the vaccine's first "teen death", a claim denied by the Chief Coroner and the Prime Minister. The next month another complaint to the Law Society claimed she breached the Lawyers and Conveyancers Act 2008 by "promotion of misinformation as a tool for the self-promotion of her firm and political party" and bringing her profession into disrepute.

In November the Law Society announced they would "investigate general concerns raised around Ms Grey's activities" rather than pursue any specific complaint. The Nelson Standards Committee conducted an investigation, and referred the matter to the Lawyers and Conveyancers Disciplinary Tribunal. Grey requested a review of that decision, but this was resolved and in December 2022 it was determined that "charges can now be filed with the Tribunal." A preliminary hearing with the Lawyers and Conveyancers Disciplinary Tribunal was held on 24 July, with Grey having tried and failed to have the matter thrown out. She argued that she should not be held to "the standards that a lawyer is held to" when she acts as a politician or while wearing other "hats". The tribunal reserved its decision, and on 4 August 2023 found her comments did not amount to misconduct because they were made by her as a private citizen.

== Contempt of court ==
On 13 December 2022, Grey was briefly placed in custody by the judge trying the case of Mad Café owner Kelvin McKenney, also known as Nganga. McKenney, whose Collingwood café is known as an "anti-vax" business, was representing himself in the judge-only trial, charged with selling alcohol without a licence. He said that Grey was there "on behalf of the courts" to present "legal facts". The judge had Grey removed for contempt and she spent time in a cell. Later the same day, Grey appeared in front of the judge. She apologised and said that she had intended to act as a McKenzie friend of the defendant, assisting the court. Judge Zohrab described her behaviour as disruptive, having the effect of inciting people in the back of the court to the degree there was a “virtual riot”. The Law Society will review Grey's conduct in court.
