= Bill Wilson (judge) =

New Zealand lawyer and judge (1946–2026)

Bill Wilson KC

Justice of the Supreme Court
- In office 1 February 2008 – 5 November 2010

Judge of the Court of Appeal
- In office 1 February 2007 – 1 February 2008

Personal details
- Born: William McLeod Wilson; 17 May 1946 Auckland, New Zealand
- Died: 12 September 2025 (aged 79)

William McLeod Wilson KC (17 May 1946 – 12 September 2025) was a New Zealand lawyer and judge. He was appointed to the Court of Appeal in 2007 and the Supreme Court the following year. In 2010, he became the first New Zealand judge to resign after being accused of judicial misconduct. Wilson was subjected to the first report by the Judicial Conduct Commissioner, which recommended a Judicial Conduct Panel be formed. This report of the Commissioner was prematurely released to the press and subsequent media attention forced Wilson's resignation from the Supreme Court.

== Early life and family ==
Wilson was born in Auckland on 17 May 1946. Both of his parents were schoolteachers, and the family moved to New Plymouth, where his father was principal of Welbourn School. Wilson was educated at New Plymouth Boys' High School, and went on the study law at Victoria University of Wellington, where he earned LLB and LLM degrees.

== Legal career ==
After graduating, Wilson worked with law firm Bell Gully and became a partner of the firm in 1971. He was a member of the Waitangi Tribunal from 1986 to 1995 and became a Queen's Counsel in 1996.

Wilson was appointed as a judge on the Court of Appeal of New Zealand in early 2007.

After serving less than a year on the Court of Appeal, Wilson was appointed to the Supreme Court of New Zealand in December 2007 to replace the retiring Sir Kenneth Keith.

=== Misconduct allegation and resignation ===
In 2010, three complaints were made to the Judicial Conduct Commissioner Sir David Gascoigne. It was alleged that Wilson had sat as a member of the Court of Appeal in which Alan Galbraith QC was representing one of the parties. The complaints alleged that Wilson had failed to disclose the extent to which he could be seen as beholden to Galbraith. The complaints stated that while Galbraith and Wilson both equally owned an equestrian business, Galbraith had put in approximately $200,000 more into the business than Wilson had. Galbraith was also a contractual guarantor on a loan Wilson had received from the bank. Wilson opposed the view that there was a logical connection behind these arrangements and a conflict of interest; however the legal threshold for recusal is "the appearance of bias", not bias itself.

On the basis of the complaints, a preliminary investigation by the Judicial Conduct Commissioner recommended that Attorney-General Chris Finlayson establish a Judicial Conduct Panel. The Judicial Conduct Commissioner publicly released the content of his recommendation before a Judicial Conduct Panel was appointed to investigate, effectively ending Wilson's ability to continue as a judge. The Judicial Conduct Commissioner's findings were subject to a successful judicial review by Wilson in the full High Court, which found the Judicial Conduct Commissioner had made several errors in law. The Court was also troubled that Wilson had been subject to the release of the report, which is envisaged to be confidential. The Court noted that Wilson had been the subject of "inaccurate publicity, apparently designed to hound him from office".

Wilson announced in October 2010 that he would resign from the Supreme Court, effective 5 November. The Ministry of Justice gave him one year's salary and per the JCC and JCP Act, his legal fees were met. It was reported that the government had rejected an earlier offer of Wilson to resign because the terms were unacceptable to the government. Wilson was the first New Zealand judge to resign after being accused of judicial misconduct.

As with other judges, Wilson ceased being able to use the title The Honourable after leaving the bench. While the convention is that former judges have the right to use that title by notice in the New Zealand Gazette, that did not occur in Wilson's case.

Lawyer Sue Grey from the original case who had originally argued Wilson had a conflict of interest, was fired from her job at Department of Conservation over her role in the case.

== Later life ==
Wilson lived in retirement at Kaiteretere, and was affected by Parkinson's Disease in the last 15 years of his life. He died on 12 September 2025, at the age of 79.
