= Gandalf the Green Fairy =

New Zealand cannabis advocate

- Born: Paul Fraser Smith; 1958 or 1959 (age 67–68)
- Other name: Gandalf
- Occupations: Cannabis grower and advocate

Paul Fraser Smith (born 1958 or 1959), known as "Gandalf the Green Fairy", is a New Zealand cannabis grower and advocate who gained national prominence for supplying black-market medicinal cannabis to patients unable to afford or access legal alternatives. Operating from Northland, New Zealand, Smith supported hundreds of patients through his illicit operation until a police raid in early 2025 dismantled his greenhouses. His actions have fuelled debate about medicinal cannabis accessibility in New Zealand, earning him both praise and criticism.

== Early life ==
Smith was born in 1958 or 1959. He settled in Northland, New Zealand, where he later established his cannabis-growing operation. Smith became a vegetarian as a teenager in Sydney, Australia, after reading health food literature, which sparked his interest in organic growing. He worked in a quarry driving heavy machinery for six years and later ran his own business before turning to wood-turning, crafting bowls sold in Auckland galleries. His shift to cannabis cultivation began around age 19, a practice he pursued intermittently for over 40 years.

== Cannabis advocacy and operation ==
Smith adopted the alias "Gandalf, the Green Fairy", a nod to The Lord of the Rings character, reflecting his long, silver-grey hair and barefoot lifestyle. He began producing cannabis oils and balms for medicinal use, supplying hundreds of patients – many elderly, with conditions like cancer or chronic pain – across New Zealand. Smith argued his work filled a gap left by New Zealand's Medicinal Cannabis Scheme, launched in 2020, which he and others criticised for its high costs and limited access.

Operating from greenhouses on his Northland property, Smith cultivated specific strains tailored for medicinal purposes. His network expanded after meeting Pearl Schomburg, a medicinal cannabis advocate, who connected him with patients and figures like Green Party MP Chlöe Swarbrick. Smith's operation gained wider attention through journalist Patrick Gower's 2019 documentary series Patrick Gower: On Weed, where he was featured as a "green fairy" supplying over 1,000 people.

In early 2025, New Zealand police raided Smith's Northland property, destroying multiple greenhouses and seizing his cannabis plants. The raid, executed 10 kilometres down an unsealed road and up a long driveway, disrupted supply for hundreds of patients, many of whom relied on Smith's affordable alternatives to legal products costing hundreds of dollars monthly. At age 66, Smith faced legal repercussions, though specific charges and outcomes remained unreported as of February, 2025. This was not his first encounter with law enforcement; a prior arrest about five years earlier led to community service, during which he built connections that bolstered his operation. Smith had assumed that the police had, up until the raid, turned a blind eye to his operation due to the nature of his customers. In later interviews with Patrick Gower, Smith expressed devastation not for himself but for the patients left without relief.

On the 3rd March, Smith appeared in Whangārei District Court, pleading not guilty to three charges of supplying cannabis illegally. He is due to return to court on April 29th. The court appearance attracted the support of protesters, dressed in green, chanting "free the green fairies". Smith's daughter, Tami Ludlow, set up a fundraiser to pay for legal costs.

== Public reception ==
Smith's work has divided public opinion. Supporters, including patients and advocates like Schomburg, view him as a folk hero who provided relief where the legal system failed, with some on social media calling him a "national treasure" after the 2025 raid. Critics, including authorities, argue his unregulated operation posed risks and undermined the Medicinal Cannabis Scheme, citing potential inconsistencies in product safety. His case has amplified calls for reform, spotlighting the gap between legal availability and patient need. The raid has also renewed debates about decriminalising home cultivation of cannabis for medical use, a proposal previously rejected in Parliament.

== Personal life ==
Smith identifies as a vegan and organic grower. His nonconformist ethos is reflected in quirky habits, such as eschewing underwear for over 46 years, a detail noted in interviews with Patrick Gower. He views his cannabis work as a calling, once stating, "I believe this is why I was put here on earth, to help my fellow man," despite the legal risks.
