= Green fairy (cannabis) =

Supplier of illicit medicinal cannabis

A green fairy is a person who provides cannabis or cannabis-based products intended for medicinal use, irrespective of the law. The term is thought to have originated in New Zealand, popularised in the 2010s in New Zealand media, and is associated with a subculture of New Zealand medicinal cannabis suppliers who operate illicitly.

Green fairies operate semi-publicly and claim to be motivated by altruistic and political reasons, as opposed to personal financial gain. Unlike ordinary black market dealers, green fairies primarily work with those who suffer from chronic conditions, and provide products better suited for medicinal applications, such as topical balms and CBD oils. Green fairies also to pay attention to the needs of medicinal users, such as offering advice, helping old and sick clients access cannabis safely, and using privately grown or sourced cannabis to reduce the risk of contaminants.

The political and cultural aspects of the green fairy movement in New Zealand have been the subject of various media pieces and academic articles, particularly in reference to the debate around drug laws. Due to the relative transparency around their activities, some green fairies have been subject to public legal issues, including criminal charges, home detention, and loss of access to banking services.

Since the legalisation of medicinal cannabis in New Zealand, green fairies continue to operate, providing products that are not available under the medicinal scheme and assisting those who cannot afford prescription medicines. A study by Massey University published in 2025 found that many medicinal cannabis users in New Zealand still accessed the black market, however the number has dropped sharply year-on-year since 2023.

== History ==
The earliest example of a green fairy in New Zealand history is thought to be Sister Mary Joseph Aubert, who is believed to have been the first person to grow cannabis in New Zealand in the late 1800s. It is claimed that Aubert grew cannabis and sold medicinal products to fundraise for welfare projects. However, some religious organisations have written opinion pieces disputing the source of the claim, arguing the evidence is anecdotal.

The term 'green fairy' became popular in mainstream media in the late 2010s, particularly in connection to political efforts to legalise medicinal cannabis in New Zealand. (Note: See Google Trends for the term "green fairy" in New Zealand) Cannabis campaigner Rose Renton was referred to as a green fairy for her medicinal cannabis operation, a label which she embraced. Renton was subsequently charged with cultivation of cannabidiol plants but avoided conviction.

In the mid-2020s, Paul Smith, who had been a green fairy for decades and was widely known by his alias of "Gandalf", made headlines after being named and arrested at age 66. Green MP Chloe Swarbrick, and a former police officer who had once worked Smith's case, both voiced support for Smith and spoke out against his arrest. Smith plead not guilty to the charges. Small protests were held at his court appearances in early 2025, organised by fellow green fairy Maki Herbert.

In 2022, an estimated 266,700 New Zealanders used cannabis for medicinal purposes, with just 6% of that figure accessing cannabis through a prescription. By 2024, this figure had increased to an estimated 37%. Despite medicinal cannabis law reform, green fairy operations are thought to account for a significant amount of non-prescription medicinal cannabis use, and green fairies often report high demand for their services.

== Public opinion ==
Green fairies are controversial due to the debate around legality and drug cultivation. In published articles, there are varying degrees of support voiced by some politicians, former police officers, and academics, who view green fairy activities as an act of compassion addressing a healthcare gap. Because of the perceived altruistic nature of green fairy operations, some high-profile cases have ended without charges. However, green fairies also report personal struggles, legal issues, and persecution for their activities, including sting operations by journalists.

Some experts and businesses in the medicinal cannabis industry have criticised green fairy products, claiming they are inconsistent in quality and cannabinoid content and are incorrectly labelled. A 2021 study in the Australian Journal of Chemistry backed the claim that CBD content in green fairy products can be inaccurate and may fail to provide effective doses.

== Notable green fairies ==
- Suzanne Aubert — Religious sister who started two hospitals and founded the Congregation of the Holy Family, and is widely believed to have been among the first people to grow cannabis in New Zealand
- Rose Renton — Medicinal cannabis campaigner, whose late son was the first person in New Zealand to be legally treated with cannabis oil
- Paul "Gandalf" Smith — Northland-based green fairy who was arrested in a high-profile operation
- Maki Herbert — co-leader of the Aotearoa Legalise Cannabis Party and candidate for the Te Tai Tokerau electorate

== See also ==
- Cannabis culture
- Illegal drug trade
