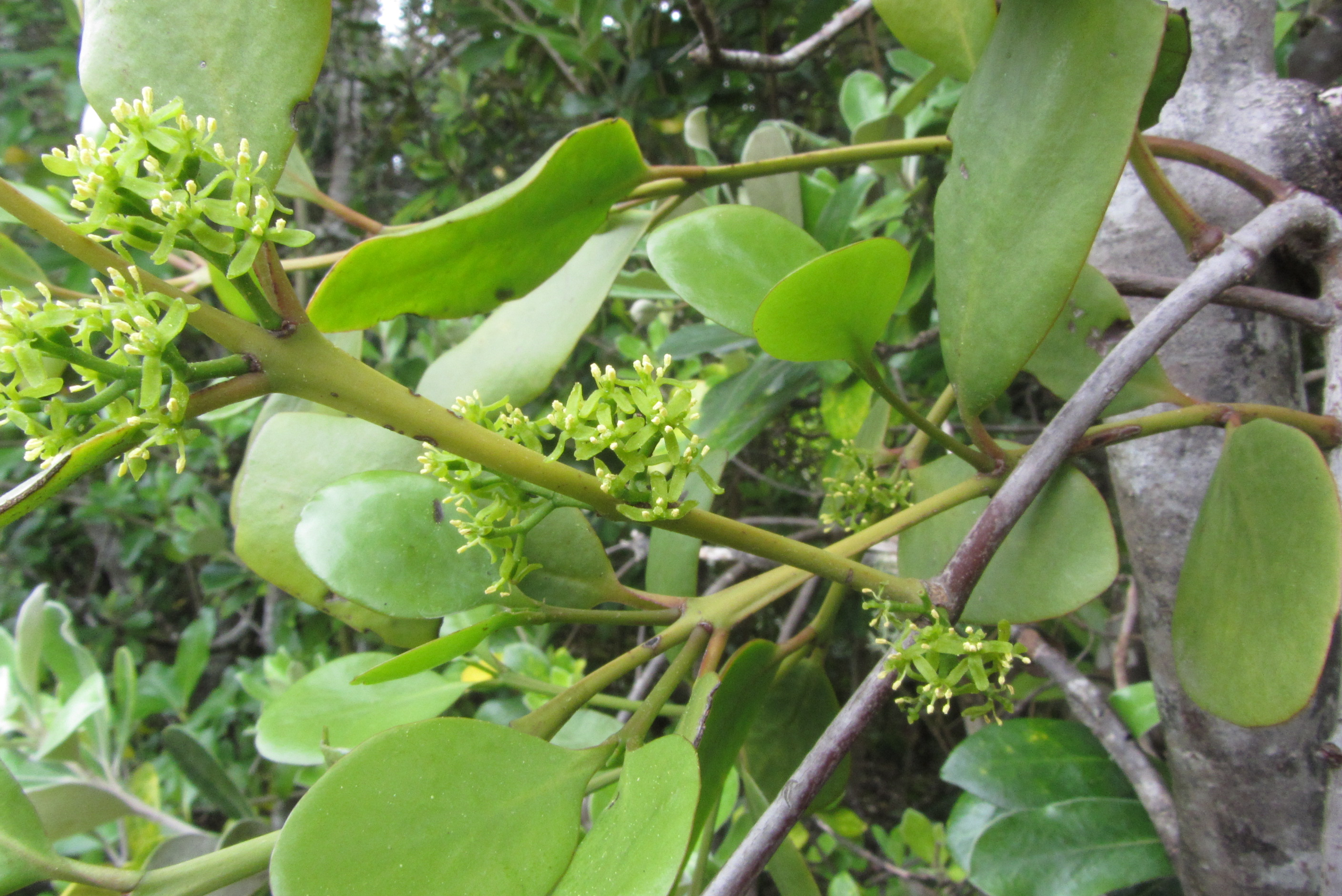

Scientific classification
- Kingdom: Plantae
- Clade: Embryophytes
- Clade: Tracheophytes
- Clade: Angiosperms
- Clade: Eudicots
- Order: Santalales
- Family: Loranthaceae
- Genus: Ileostylus
- Species: I. micranthus

Binomial name
- Ileostylus micranthus (Hook.f.) Tiegh. (1894)

= Ileostylus micranthus =

Species of mistletoe

Ileostylus micranthus, commonly known as green mistletoe pikirangi; pirinoa; pirirangi; pirita; small-flowered mistletoe, is a species of mistletoe in the family Loranthaceae.

== Description ==
Ileostylus micranthus is a mistletoe native to New Zealand and the Norfolk Islands. In New Zealand it is also known by its Māori name Pirita.

Mistletoes are stem hemiparasites that live on the limbs of a host tree or shrub and consume water, nutrients transported by water, and organic solutes. The Loranthaceae and Viscaceae are the two main groups of mistletoe. Loranthaceae contains 50 to 80 genera, which are primarily Southern Hemisphere-based. There are six endemic Loranthaceae species in New Zealand. Since European settlement, all have decreased in abundance. Loss of territory and the introduction of herbivores, particularly the Australian brushtail possum, have caused the decline.

Ileostylus micranthus grows in clusters on their host plant with a diameter of at least 2 m. It has opposite pairs of thick, leathery leaves with a leaf length between 2 cm and 8 cm and a width of 1 to 3 cm.

The leaves have smooth edges, no visible veining, and a rounded shape. Young branchlets are curved and green. The flowers are tiny (3–5 mm in diameter), greenish-yellow, and lightly scented. When the yellow fruit has matured, it is rounded with about a 6-mm diameter. The ripe fruit has green interior flesh and one sticky seed.

== Distribution ==
Ileostylus micranthus occurs on Norfolk Island with a status of vulnerability under The Environment Protection and Biodiversity Conservation Act 1999. Ileostylus micranthus arrived on Norfolk Island from New Zealand in the 1930s, apparently unaided. There are few records of Ileostylus on Norfolk Island but a larger abundance in New Zealand, where it can be found throughout the North Island, South Island and Stewart Island.

Ileostylus micranthus can be found in New Zealand in locations that include the Northland Podocarpus totara forests, the Rotorua/Taupō area of the Taupō Volcanic Zone's regenerating scrub and forest, as well as the grey-scrub communities of Marlborough-Kaikōura, Banks Peninsula, Central Otago (the Lake District), and Dunedin. Ileostylus is also frequently connected to Cook Strait's coastal forests, saline marches, and portions of Nelson and Westland.

== Habitat ==
Ileostylus micranthus occurs mostly in the lowland districts in the North Island, South Island and Stewart Island. The distribution of this species indicates that it prefers lowland environments and that there is no clear national correlation between it and any host.

Ileostylus micranthus compared to other parasitizing mistletoes within New Zealand is newly introduced. The variability of spatial and temporal host availability since its arrival has appeared to have the most favored host generalization. There are two modes of important evolutionary variety for parasites which are co-speciation and host-switching. Ileostylus micranthus appears to have no host specialization due to having records of parasitizing taxa over 209 species including 92 exotic species and three species that are restricted to Norfolk Island.

== Ecology ==
Ileostylus micranthus has unique physiological characteristics and morphological structures that assist them to develop connections with its host plants. Water, organic acids, ions, sugars, minerals and amino acids can be easily transported through the connections made by the vascular connection points. The nutrients required for attachment and the growth of the first photosynthetic structures are supplied by maternal reserves when an Ileostylus micranthus seed is dispersed by birds to the host branch. Ileostylus micranthus has viscous seeds meaning that it has a thick residue surrounding the exterior of the seed. This is an adaptation to adhere to the host species and the parasite then needs to establish a connection with the host in order to continue functioning. Once the parasite has become established, the hypocotyl straightens and pulls the two cotyledons out of the endosperm. The first pair of true leaves usually develop around four weeks after the initial pair of small green cotyledons, which function as leaves.

Fully developed Ileostylus micranthus plants have a high use of water and nutrients (N and P), wide stomata and low stomatal density. Low stomatal density impacts and influences the plant's characteristics for plant growth which can be calculated by the stomata number per unit leaf area. Ileostylus micranthus accumulates the host plant species’ nutrients (C, K, N, P, Ca, and Mg) into their own tissues by making them soluble. This process takes the host plant species’ reserves of non-structural carbohydrates, negatively impacting the efficiency of the host plant processes.

Silvereyes, bellbirds, and tui are the three most significant avian dispersers of the Ileostylus micranthu seeds. The fruits are swallowed whole, and the seeds later became defecated in a germinal state. These birds tend to frequent plants for only 1–2 minutes, eating a few mistletoe fruits each time. Seeds fail to germinate unless the fruit exterior, or exocarp, is removed, either manually or by passing through the gut of a bird. The only method of exocarp removal that is successful in the field is bird dispersal, even though hand removal of the exocarp can result in a germination rate that was equal to or higher than that of bird removal.

If the fruit of the Ileostylus micranthus has not been consumed by avian dispersers, the fruit will overripen and fall off the fruit stalk and rot, negatively impacting the germination and success of the seed. Ileostylus micranthus have unspecialized flowers which means that native and or introduced insect species can pollinate. Flowering occurs between September and December and fruiting occurs between the months of April and June.

=== Predators, parasites, and diseases ===
Native Loranthaceae are less prevalent than they were a century ago in many parts of New Zealand. The traditional explanation for this decline is that habitat destruction and, more recently, possum browsing is to blame. Native avian species (and the self-introduced silvereye) almost entirely carry out dispersal. Introduced frugivorous birds, like blackbirds and thrushes, eat scant amounts of mistletoe fruit and cannot make up for the decline in native bird populations brought on by the arrival of mammalian predators.

Fruit production is partially limited to the dispersal of the amount of bird availability. This could be related to a number of factors such as the competitive interactions being increased by the introduction of new insect species which are using resources such as honeydew for the intention of food supply. As well as the overall densities of avian dispersers to fulfil the mutual relationship that the Ileostylus micranthus creates with birds (Tui, bellbird, Silvereye and introduced birds).

Predators can impact the Ileostylus micranthus indirectly and directly. Indirectly, mammalian introduced species can negatively impact the population of seed dispersers (native and introduced birds). Ileostylus micranthus relies heavily on the seed dispersers to reach their host species and to be able to attach to the host species (removal of the exocarp).

Tui and other native bird species fluctuate in population densities, which the change in population can be a strong influence on Ileostylus micranthus success. Due to impacting the rate of reproduction and survival for Ileostylus micranthus. Avian seedvdispersers are facing an increase in habitat loss and non-native mammalian predators including the Norway rat (Rattus norvegicus), Polynesian rat (Rattus exulans) and the Ship rat (Rattus). Other species that are predators include the Brushtail possums (Trichosurus vulpecula), Cats (Felis catus), Mustlelids and Mice (Mus musculus) which all prey on the dependable Ileostylus micranthus seed dispersers.

The direct effect of these mammalian introduced species is the predation of the Ileostylus micranthus flowers and seeds, These predators impact the reproduction and survival rate due to the disturbance of the germination process (avian dispersers are unable to digest the seeds to remove the exocarp for germination). To be able to conserve and maintain the Ileostylus micranthus population, measures need to be implemented to ensure that the avian seed dispersers maintain or increase population densities to increase the survival and reproductive rate of Ileostylus micranthus.
