= Abe Gray =

Cannabis activist from New Zealand

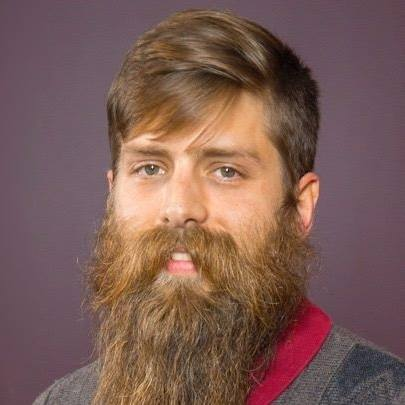
- Gray in 2017
- Born: Abraham Gabriel Gray; 16 March 1982 (age 44); Minneapolis, Minnesota, United States
- Education: University of Minnesota; University of Otago
- Known for: Whakamana Cannabis Museum
- Political party: The Opportunities Party (formerly) Aotearoa Legalise Cannabis Party (formerly)

Abraham Gabriel Gray (born 16 March 1982) is an American-born New Zealand cannabis activist, former politician and founder of the Whakamana Cannabis Museum, New Zealand's first and only cannabis museum. Gray was a University of Otago lecturer and tutor for over a decade before founding the museum.

Gray has been a high-profile cannabis activist and protester for almost two decades, and is known as New Zealand's "Gandalf of Weed".

== Biography ==
=== Early life ===
Gray grew up in Minneapolis, Minnesota and attended South High School. Gray ran for student president of his high school on a stoner ticket, unsuccessfully, but blames low turnout and students skipping assembly for it. As a teenager, Gray attempted to find new connections to get access to cannabis, so Gray started working at a local head shop. This soon inspired Gray's passion for cannabis, as he would spend his time at the store consuming books on the history and cultivation of cannabis.

Gray started growing weed in his closet, taking classes on plant propagation, learning to clone and tell the difference between strains.

Gray said following the enactment of the US Patriot Act: "cannabis-smoking hippies were as legitimate a target for the Patriot Act police state as minorities".

Gray read several articles, in the magazines High Times and Cannabis Culture, about New Zealand's newly elected Green MP Nándor Tánczos and how New Zealand was on the precipice of legalising cannabis. Gray told himself "I'm gonna go to NZ, enrol in a uni that teaches botany, and I'm gonna learn to grow the dankest weed."

=== Moving to New Zealand and university days ===
Gray arrived in New Zealand five days after the 2002 New Zealand general election, where the Green Party were no longer in government, meaning cannabis legislation was not an option for the foreseeable future. After the Green's failure to make advances in cannabis policy at the 2002 election, Gray joined the Legalise Cannabis Party.

Gray earned a master's degree in Botany from the University of Otago, but was too paranoid about his immigration status to grow or sell any cannabis during his first three years in New Zealand. Despite this, Gray did smoke cannabis and take part in cannabis protests, including two occasions where he led a group who hot-boxed the Dunedin police station at the annual J Day protest march in 2003 and 2004. These experiences helped him realise the strength in numbers and the power of protest.

Abe was involved in a University of Otago club of cannabis enthusiasts, Otago NORML, and was its president for many years. Otago NORML started gathering on the University of Otago Union Lawn at 4:20pm every Friday to smoke together. The club soon became one of the largest on campus, but the university was displeased. Campus security guards tried to forcefully move the group away, causing a backlash among members that made local headlines. The weekly smoke sessions became twice-weekly. The club held lectures, debates, and an entire cannabis awareness week on campus. This caused Gray to become the target of a six-month investigation by the police Special Tactics Group.

Gray was arrested in 2008 by a group of uniformed officers while giving a presentation about cannabis at the university's annual clubs day. Gray was warned police officers were heading his way, but was confident they were not after him so he kept a bag of cannabis in his pocket. But it was for him. Gray was dragged to a police car. An angry crowd followed them and laid down in front of the police cars, and five additional undercover police officers came out to attempt to control the situation.

Green MP Metiria Turei was at another stall and yelled at the officers, demanding identification, and said the police response was over the top. Gray was charged with possession of a pipe, one gram of cannabis and resisting arrest, but was discharged without conviction. The court disclosure documents showed all of his text messages and bank records covering the last six months.

These protests and encounters with the police are covered in 2015 New Zealand documentary Druglawed, which documents the history of cannabis prohibition in the US and New Zealand, outlining political and economic reasons for its prohibition. It argues New Zealand mirrors the USA's war on drugs, and prohibition is failing.

=== Political life ===
Gray stood as a list candidate for the Aotearoa Legalise Cannabis Party in the 2011 New Zealand general election, and served as their deputy leader. Though inspired by Nándor Tánczos, Gray became disillusioned by what he saw as the Green Party's "political posturing" on cannabis law reform. He stuck with the Aotearoa Legalise Cannabis Party.

Gray participated in the 2011 "Occupy Dunedin" protest, as part of a worldwide movement supporting Occupy Wall Street. There were more than 100 protesters and 30 tents at the Octagon.

In 2014, Gray contested Dunedin North for the Aotearoa Legalise Cannabis Party, coming fifth.

In 2016, Gray ran in the 2016 Dunedin mayoral election, coming tenth with 734 votes.

Gray ran for the Aotearoa Legalise Cannabis Party in the 2017 Mount Albert by-election, running against Jacinda Ardern, Julie Anne Genter and Geoff Simmons.

Later in 2017, Gray left his role as president of the Aotearoa Legalise Cannabis Party and ran for The Opportunities Party (TOP) in Dunedin North, partly due to a dissatisfied member base which wanted him gone, and partly because he was impressed by TOP's drug reform policy. Gray called on other ACLP members to transition to TOP. Late in the 2017 election, the Greens went all-in promoting their cannabis legalisation policy, ultimately leading to the 2020 New Zealand cannabis referendum, which Gray is convinced would not have happened without TOP's presence.

Gray ran for The Opportunities Party in Wellington Central in the 2020 New Zealand general election, coming fourth with 1,031 votes, and led the Yes We Cannabis campaign as a spinoff of Start The Conversation. Gray also served as The Opportunities Party's 2020 cannabis spokesperson, and was on a mission to be "the first Minister of Cannabis". Gray says he supported the Cannabis Legalisation and Control Bill, and believes it was important to include edibles in the legislation to give people an alternative to smoking or vaping. Gray believes a regionalised model to cannabis is worth exploring.

In August 2023, Abe Gray was selected by The Opportunities Party as their candidate for the North Shore in the 2023 New Zealand general election. He ranked tenth on the party list. On 14 October, Gray came fifth place, with 1,229 votes.

TOP received 2.22% of the party vote, below the five percent threshold needed to enter Parliament.

=== Cannabis Museum and activism ===
In 2013, Gray opened the Whakamana Cannabis Museum from a Dunedin flat. Gray and other activists hoped to turn Dunedin into a 'cannabis capital'. The museum tells the history of cannabis laws and protests, the biology of the plant, and different ways to consume it. The museum was listed as a guest room on Airbnb, with "awesome queen bed with reading lamps, a bit of closet space, plenty of electricity outlets and a few houseplants," listed on the promotional blurb.

In 2014, the Whakamana Cannabis Museum hosted the Aotearoa Legalise Cannabis Party AGM and Gray was elected president of the party. Gray wanted to demonstrate cannabis was a political winner and entice major parties into stealing the policy.

In 2018, the museum moved to a new location in Dunedin's main street, Princes Street, and the museum then included a cafe and VIP facilities, with Gray as the Curator and lead researcher. Members could pay a fee of $4.20 a week to access a clubroom to smoke in, complete with comfy couches, lava lamps and retro video game consoles. Club members at the museum could bring cannabis to smoke, and could exchange and sell to each other, but Gray was never involved in any sales. While the museum sold cannabis-related paraphernalia, there was no cannabis for sale. The museum had a cafe, High Tide, which sold coffees for $4.20 – a nod to cannabis culture. Comedian Guy Williams visited the museum and documented his visit for a segment on the comedy show Jono and Ben. A cannabis-keen Bitcoin millionaire donated $5000 to provide half-price drinks and food to pensioners. It was later revealed that the person who claimed to be the landlord of the museum's building did not actually own it, but Gray then managed to lease the building himself off the true owner.

Gray co-founded pro-cannabis group Start The Conversation in 2013, ultimately attracting the support of Helen Kelly (in 2016), Marc Willers, and Lucy Lawless (in 2018). Start The Conversation received a notice from Facebook saying its ad account status had been disabled. Gray alleges the group is a victim of Facebook's strict anti-cannabis stance, and said informed discussion was crucial in the lead-up to a referendum on cannabis.

From 2015 to 2018 Gray appeared weekly on the Radio Hauraki Breakfast Show with Matt Heath and Jeremy Wells under the nickname "Abe from Whakamana".

In 2018, when flying from Sydney to Christchurch, airport customs questioned Gray on wearing a cannabis T-shirt promoting the museum. The official probed him about the shirt and told him he should not wear it – especially when travelling to New Zealand. Gray said "I felt violated ... to have a pimple-faced Customs kid grilling me about my f...ing T-shirt, it was like a slap in the face coming back to the country."

After University of Otago proctor Dave Scott, a former police officer, entered at least four student flats and removed drug-taking equipment, Gray sought legal advice for a possible private prosecution. Hundreds signed a petition for Scott to resign. Gray said a cannabis supporter known to him had pledged $25,000 to take a private prosecution. The Whakamana Cannabis Museum also offered to sponsor brand new water pipes for the flats.

In 2019, Whakamana Cannabis Museum moved to a spot in Christchurch's Manchester St. The museum's Christchurch location was in Shand's Emporium, Christchurch's oldest commercial building.

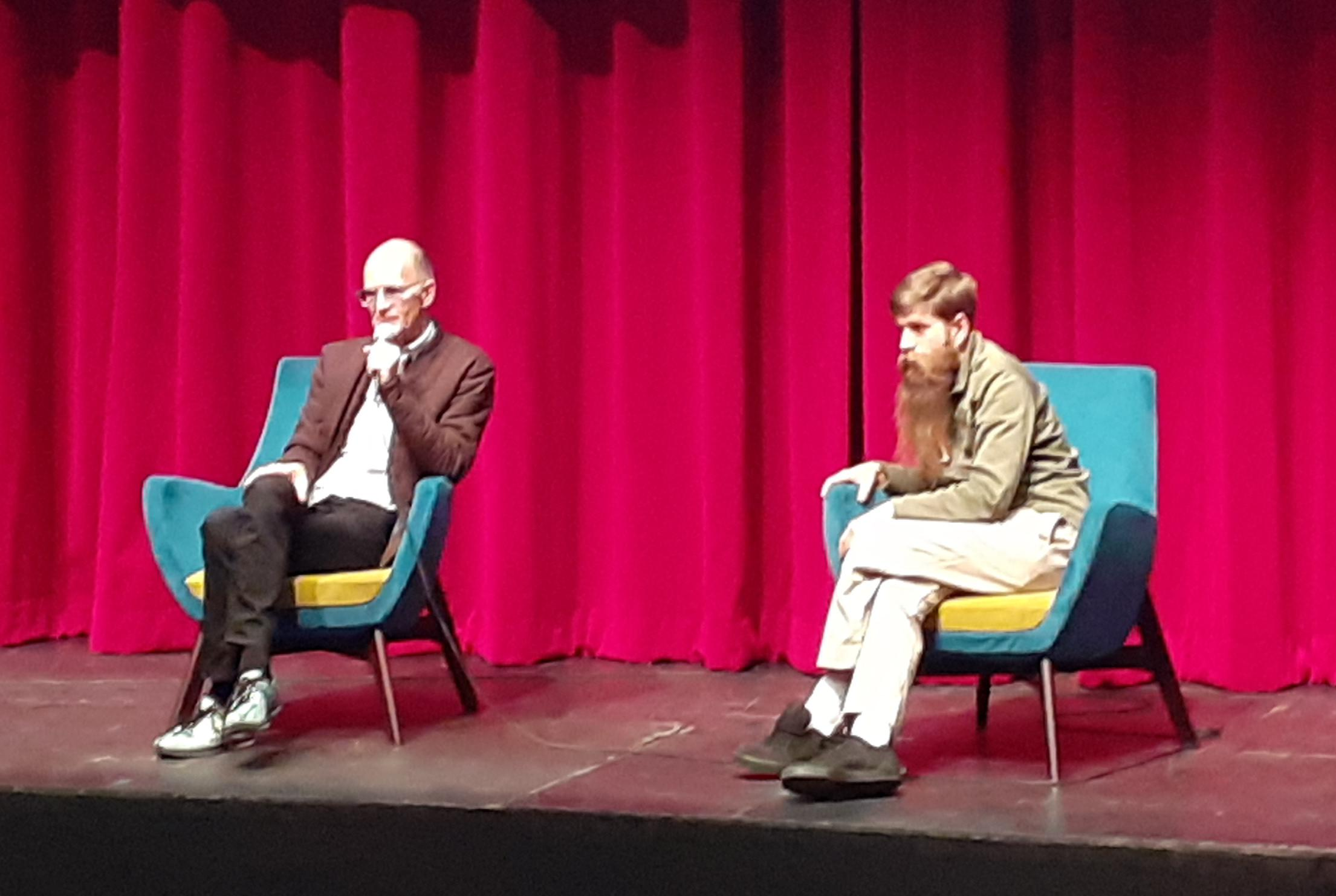
Mayell (left) and Gray speaking at the University of Canterbury, October 2019.

In 2019, Gray and Cookie Time founder Michael Mayell launched a PledgeMe crowdfunder, hoping to raise $2 million to publicly fund an expansion of the cannabis museum in Christchurch. They raised $214,616 from 299 donations. They were planning on calling it Whakamana, the New Zealand Institute of Cannabis Education, Research and Development with plans of an expanded version of Gray's Dunedin museum, including a hemp food cafe and restaurant, hemp emporium and an alcohol-free plant shot bar. Gray said recent scaremongering from the "anti-cannabis brigade" in response to those plans made it clearer that having somewhere like Whakamana presenting facts was even more critical in the lead up to the 2020 referendum and beyond.

The Christchurch location closed down in 2020, after Gray had to move to Wellington for his wife's job. A planned pop-up in Wellington timed to coincide with the 2020 referendum never materialised due to the COVID-19 pandemic.

The 2020 New Zealand cannabis referendum did not pass, but in 2021, Gray moved to Auckland, and began looking for a retail space to open the fourth iteration of the museum. In 2023 Gray held a fundraiser for reopening the museum in the iconic Hopetoun Alpha heritage building in Central Auckland, with a view to reopening the museum permanently at that location. In 2024 Gray started weekly social club meet ups at an Auckland waterfront bar and announced that the Museum would re-open permanently in Hopetoun Alpha in mid-2024. On August 9th 2024 the Museum was officially re-opened by Auckland Central Member of Parliament and Green Party Co-Leader Chloe Swarbrick in a ribbon cutting ceremony.

== Views ==
Gray said he believes what stops marijuana law reform is that it's a direct challenge to existing power structures. Drug companies are reluctant, on financial grounds, to have laws that allow people to grow "medicine" in their back yards and police would be hesitant to water down laws that give them the power to search and prosecute hundreds of thousands of Kiwis, he says. "All of these barriers exist to change. Even if it seems obvious it should be done for the good of human rights." Gray believes public pressure for change will become more vocal as other countries, particularly Australia, adopt laws allowing marijuana for medical reasons.

In 2016, following Rebecca Reider being allowed to travel through the customs at Auckland Airport with medicinal cannabis, Gray said Reider's success would open the way for others to bring in cannabis.

Gray was skeptical that CBD gel being tested on patients in New Zealand with a specific form of epilepsy would change the mind of the Minister of Health. "The current approach of the NZ Ministry of Health tends to ignore the evidence from people who have successfully used various cannabis products." He added, "My experience indicates that the real problem is not the lack of evidence, but the lack of resources to collect, assess and circulate that evidence in a transparent way and a lack of education of doctors and other medical experts on how and why cannabinoids work and how they can most effectively be used."

In 2018, Gray said New Zealand risks being "completely left behind" if it continues to "drag its heels" regarding ending prohibition of cannabis. He says New Zealand could benefit from an annual $1 billion medicinal cannabis market and an annual $5 billion recreational market if cannabis is legalised. New Zealand is "already missing the boat on getting involved at the ground level with this globally important agricultural commodity". University of Otago's Dr Joseph Boden agrees, saying the data coming out of the American states where cannabis has been legalised has shown that there's a "huge tax take".

Gray stated he agrees that CBD-only products are not terribly effective. "CBD on its own without any THC is the most ineffective form of medicinal cannabis but the most politically accepted, because it's a single compound that can be easily synthesised and has no psychoactive components. When it comes to medicinal use you need the full spectrum of components to work effectively."

Gray predicted by 2030 that cannabis will "be as common as it is now, but it won't be as hidden away". Gray expects some cities to push back on cannabis legislation, but believed Christchurch would embrace it. Cannabis cafes would be around, Gray added, but he did not think they would be as common as bars.

In 2020, following at least 10 incidents of gang members robbing and assaulting people using Discord to buy drugs, Gray says the issue is an example of harm caused by prohibition of cannabis. "No-one is going to meet someone in an alleyway to buy anything if it is available on the legal market... For young people, they are going to find a way, so we really have to decouple cannabis from the black market to keep them safe."

== Personal life ==
Gray has lived in New Zealand since 2002 and now lives in Auckland. Gray has a Masters in Botany from University of Otago. Gray has two children and his wife is a surgeon.

== Electoral history ==
=== 2014 general election: Dunedin North ===
2014 general election: Dunedin North
Notes:	Blue background denotes the winner of the electorate vote. Pink background denotes a candidate elected from their party list. Yellow background denotes an electorate win by a list member, or other incumbent. A ✓ or ✗ denotes status of any incumbent, win or lose respectively.						
Party	Candidate	Votes	%	±%	Party votes	%	±%
Labour	✓ David Clark	16,315	47.40	+3.15	11,147	31.82	−1.98
National	Michael Woodhouse	10,398	30.21	−2.14	11,302	32.26	−0.13
Green	Metiria Turei	5,978	17.37	−2.14	8,035	22.94	−0.45
Conservative	Jonathan Daley	621	1.80	+1.80	956	2.73	+1.38
Legalise Cannabis	Abe Gray	580	1.69	+0.33	172	0.49	−0.08
Internet	Rob Stewart	255	0.74	+0.74			
Independent	Adrian Daegal Graamans	106	0.31	+0.31			
Democrats	Miriam Mowat	159	0.31	−0.36	37	0.11	−0.10
Independent	Stan Lusby	62	0.18	+0.18			
NZ First					2,364	6.75	+1.06
Internet Mana					603	1.72	+1.12 (Note: 2014 Internet Mana swing is relative to the votes for Mana in 2011; it shared a party list with Internet in the 2014 election.)
Māori Party					124	0.35	−0.07
ACT					111	0.32	−0.41
United Future New Zealand					86	0.25	−0.29
Ban 1080					60	0.17	+0.17
Civilian					27	0.08	+0.08
Independent Coalition					7	0.02	+0.02
Focus					1	0.00	+0.00
Informal votes		216			99		
Total valid votes		34,636			35,131		
Turnout		35,230	79.88	+11.50			
Labour hold	Majority	5,917	17.19	+5.29			

=== 2016 Dunedin mayoral election ===
Candidate	Affiliation	First Preference			Last Iteration	
Candidate	Affiliation	Votes	%	+/-	Votes	%
Dave Cull	Independent	10,816	27.1	−22.2	17,441	59.4
Lee Vandervis	Independent	7,063	17.7	+2.5	11,938	40.6
Barry Timmings		5,613	14.0			
Andrew Whiley		4,647	11.6	+4.4		
Aaron Hawkins	Green Dunedin	3,108	7.7	+0.2		
Jim O'Malley		2,501	6.2			
Conrad Stedman	Independent	2,086	5.2			
Rachel Elder		1,734	4.3			
Scout Barbour-Evans		945	2.3			
Abe Gray		734	1.8			
Athold Bayne	Stand up for Dunedin	612	1.5			
Informal votes		N/A				
Turnout		39,859				

=== 2017 Mount Albert by-election ===
The following table shows the final results:

2017 Mount Albert by-election
Notes: Blue background denotes the winner of the by-election. Pink background denotes a candidate elected from their party list prior to the by-election. Yellow background denotes the winner of the by-election, who was a list MP prior to the by-election. A ✓ or ✗ denotes status of any incumbent, win or lose respectively.
Party	Candidate	Votes	%	±%
Labour	Jacinda Ardern	10,495	76.89	
Green	Julie Anne Genter	1,564	11.45	
Opportunities	Geoff Simmons	623	4.56	
People's Party	Vin Tomar	218	1.59	
Socialist Aotearoa	Joe Carolan	189	1.38	
Independent	Penny Bright	139	1.01	
Legalise Cannabis	Abe Gray	97	0.71	
Independent	Adam Amos	81	0.59	
Independent	Dale Arthur	54	0.39	
Human Rights Party	Anthony Van den Heuvel	34	0.24	
Independent	Peter Wakeman	30	0.21	
Not A Party	Simon Smythe	19	0.13	
Communist League	Patrick Brown	16	0.11	
Informal votes		90	0.65	
Total Valid votes		13,649	30.00	
Labour hold	Majority	8,931	65.43	

=== 2017 general election: Dunedin North ===
2017 general election: Dunedin North
Notes:	Blue background denotes the winner of the electorate vote. Pink background denotes a candidate elected from their party list. Yellow background denotes an electorate win by a list member, or other incumbent. A ✓ or ✗ denotes status of any incumbent, win or lose respectively.						
Party	Candidate	Votes	%	±%	Party votes	%	±%
Labour	✓ David Clark	21,259	57.48	+10.08	17,808	47.63	+15.81
National	Michael Woodhouse	9,505	25.70	−4.51	10,382	27.77	−4.49
Green	Niki Bould	3,053	8.25	−9.12	5,110	13.67	−9.27
Opportunities	Abe Gray	1,645	4.45	—	1,535	4.11	—
NZ First	Warren Voight	1,069	2.89	—	1,899	5.08	+1.67
ACT	Sam Purchas	150	0.40	—	157	0.41	+0.09
Independent	Adrian Daegal Graamans	71	0.19	−0.12			
Independent	Stan Lusby	38	0.01	−0.17			
Māori Party					108	0.29	−0.06
Legalise Cannabis					89	0.24	−0.25
Conservative					60	0.16	−2.57
Ban 1080					55	0.15	−0.02
United Future New Zealand					20	0.08	−0.17
People's Party					17	0.05	—
Democrats					15	0.04	−0.07
Outdoors					14	0.04	—
Mana Party					11	0.03	—
Internet					10	0.03	—
Informal votes		195			86		
Total valid votes		36,985			37,385		
Labour hold	Majority	11,754	31.78	+11.92			

=== 2020 general election: Wellington Central ===
2020 general election: Wellington Central
Notes:	Blue background denotes the winner of the electorate vote. Pink background denotes a candidate elected from their party list. Yellow background denotes an electorate win by a list member, or other incumbent. A ✓ or ✗ denotes status of any incumbent, win or lose respectively.						
Party	Candidate	Votes	%	±%	Party votes	%	±%
Labour	✓ Grant Robertson	27,366	57.26	+8	20,876	43.4	+5.11
National	Nicola Willis	8,488	17.76	−7.99	6,937	14.43	−16.1
Green	James Shaw	8,381	17.54	+2.15	14,587	30.33	+8.99
Opportunities	Abe Gray	1,031	2.16	−4.66	1,790	3.72	−2.17
ACT	Brooke van Velden	865	1.81	+1.5	2,339	4.86	+4.09
Legalise Cannabis	Michael Appleby	401	0.84	—	132	0.27	+0.7
Independent	Jesse Richardson	385	0.81				
New Conservative	Liam Richfield	401	0.45		204	0.42	+0.35
Advance NZ	Rose Greally	108	0.23		103	0.21	
ONE	Gina Sunderland	84	0.18		56	0.12	
Outdoors	Bruce Robert	76	0.16		27	0.06	+0.03
NZ First					537	1.11	—1.15
Māori Party					255	0.53	−0.01
Sustainable NZ					32	0.07	
Social Credit					18	0.04	
TEA					12	0.02	
Vision NZ					8	0.01	
Heartland					1	0.00	
Informal votes		47,401			47,914		
Total valid votes		47,787			48,090		
Turnout		48,090	88.97	+2.41			
Labour hold	Majority	18,878	39.5	+15.99			

=== 2023 general election: North Shore ===
2023 general election: North Shore
Notes:	Blue background denotes the winner of the electorate vote. Pink background denotes a candidate elected from their party list. Yellow background denotes an electorate win by a list member, or other incumbent. A ✓ or ✗ denotes status of any incumbent, win or lose respectively.						
Party	Candidate	Votes	%	±%	Party votes	%	±%
National	✓ Simon Watts	24,892	60.76	+14.57	21,050	50.79	+16.74
Labour	George Hampton	8,562	20.90		7,318	17.65	−23.70
Green	Pat Baskett	3,663	8.94		4,851	11.70	+3.36
ACT	Anna Yallop	2,061	5.03		4,540	10.95	+1.09
Opportunities	Abe Gray	1,229	3.00		1,604	3.87	+1.97
NZ First					1,055	2.54	+0.64
Te Pāti Māori					209	0.50	+0.25
NZ Loyal					207	0.49	
NewZeal					133	0.32	+0.24
Legalise Cannabis					111	0.26	+0.10
Freedoms NZ					53	0.12	
New Conservatives					53	0.12	−1.09
Animal Justice					48	0.11	
Women's Rights					42	0.10	
DemocracyNZ					35	0.08	
New Nation					24	0.05	
Leighton Baker Party					7	0.01	
Informal votes		559			100		
Total valid votes		40,966			41,440		
National hold	Majority	16,330	39.86				

== See also ==
- Aotearoa Legalise Cannabis Party
- Cannabis in New Zealand
- NORML New Zealand
- Otago NORML
- The Opportunities Party
- Whakamana Cannabis Museum
