= Whakamana Cannabis Museum =

Museum in Auckland, New Zealand

Whakamana Cannabis Museum of Aotearoa
- Established: 2013
- Location: 19 Beresford Square, Auckland Central
- Coordinates: 36.85639°S 174.75833°E
- Type: Science, Social History
- Accreditation: Museums Aotearoa
- Director: Abe Gray
- Website: cannabismuseum.nz

Whakamana Cannabis Museum is a museum dedicated to cannabis history and culture, based in Auckland. It is the first cannabis museum in New Zealand, designed to be a national information centre on aspects of the science, history, and legislation surrounding cannabis, with an aim to educate the public and destigmatise adult use of cannabis. Whakamana operates within New Zealand's laws and does not sell cannabis to the public. However, the museum operates in a shared space in conjunction with Calyx Clinic, a legal medicinal dispensary. The museum also hosts community events for patients, and utilises its premises for community functions.

Whakamana was first opened in October 2013 in Dunedin by Abe Gray and Julian Crawford, who were the former deputy leader and the former spokesperson of the Aotearoa Legalise Cannabis Party (ALCP), respectively. The museum was a joint effort between the ALCP and Otago NORML. In 2018, the museum relocated to the Eldon Chambers Building in Princes Street, but closed down several months later after Gray moved to Christchurch and struggled to find volunteers to keep the Dunedin branch open.

In 2019, Gray went into partnership with Cookie Time founder Michael Mayell, who saw the project as a vessel for his interest in hemp foods and sustainability. The museum reopened in the renovated Shand's Emporium in Christchurch. Gray and Mayell began promoting the project in the lead up to the 2020 New Zealand cannabis referendum, with plans to develop Whakamana into a social club, alcohol-free venue and dispensary depending on the outcome. In late 2019, a fundraiser was launched on PledgeMe to crowdfund for the completion of their new site. The campaign failed to raise its minimum target of $1 million NZD, therefore voiding the campaign, with the money returned to investors. Following revenue issues and a failure to find suitable investors, the Christchurch location was closed. Gray relocated to Wellington the following year and attempted to relaunch the project, however the plan was scuppered due to the COVID-19 pandemic.

In 2023, Gray moved to Auckland and began a new fundraiser to reopen the museum in the Hopetoun Alpha heritage building, intending it to be a permanent location. The project received NZ$500,000 in financial support from an unnamed wealthy donor, allowing the museum to remain at the property, which has since been dubbed the "Green House". On 9 August 2024, Whakamana was officially opened by Auckland Central Member of Parliament and Green Party Co-Leader Chloe Swarbrick in a ribbon cutting ceremony.

== History ==
=== 2013–2018: Formation in Dunedin ===
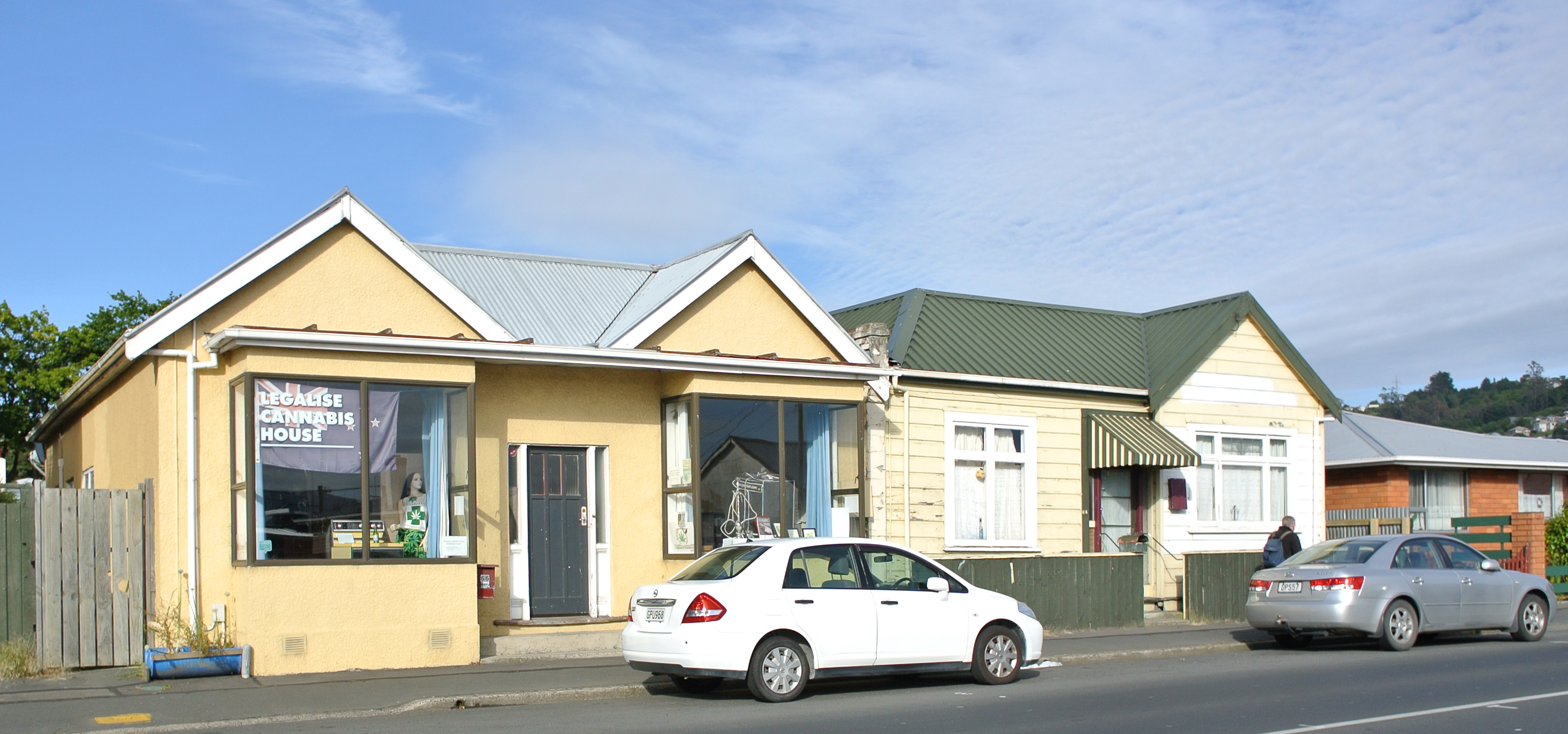
The original museum was created in the Legalise Cannabis House, pictured in late 2016

Originally located in Dunedin, the museum was first operated in the Legalise Cannabis House on David Street. The museum served as an information service to educate the public about all aspects of cannabis, including books that are unavailable at other libraries. In addition to acting as a museum and serving as a centre for drug law reform advocacy, the museum promoted open-source computer software. It also featured meeting rooms and a digital multimedia studio.

The museum was opened in 2013 by Gray, known for his cannabis activism as the former deputy leader of the Aotearoa Legalise Cannabis Party and leader of cannabis lobby group Otago NORML, and Crawford, the former ALCP regional spokesperson. It was reportedly a venture between the ALCP and Otago NORML. Dunedin has had a long history of advocacy for marijuana law reform largely through the latter organisation.

Gray, who is originally from the United States of America, has a Masters in Botany. He has spoken out about the discrimination of cannabis users and has been described as a lobbyist and an activist for cannabis. Gray publicly left his role as the president of the ALCP to support The Opportunities Party (TOP) in 2017, believing the organisation to be the most viable political platform to help effect cannabis law change at the time. Gray hoped that support from former ALCP voters would help TOP to enter parliament without requiring an electorate seat. Gareth Morgan, then the party leader, praised Gray for supporting the party's Real Deal Cannabis reform.

In 2018 the museum left its original home in South Dunedin to occupy a new central city premises in the Eldon Chambers Building in Princes Street. During this time, comedian Guy Williams documented the museum in a segment for the comedy programme Jono and Ben. Gray stated that the presence of the museum in Dunedin would put it in the ideal position to become a centre for cannabis tourism should the drug ever be legalised in New Zealand, referencing the city's history of support for law change relating to drug use and possession. However, the museum moved again in 2019, this time to Christchurch; Gray had hoped to keep a branch of the museum running in Dunedin, but found the idea unsustainable due to a reliance on volunteers.

=== 2019–2022: Christchurch project ===
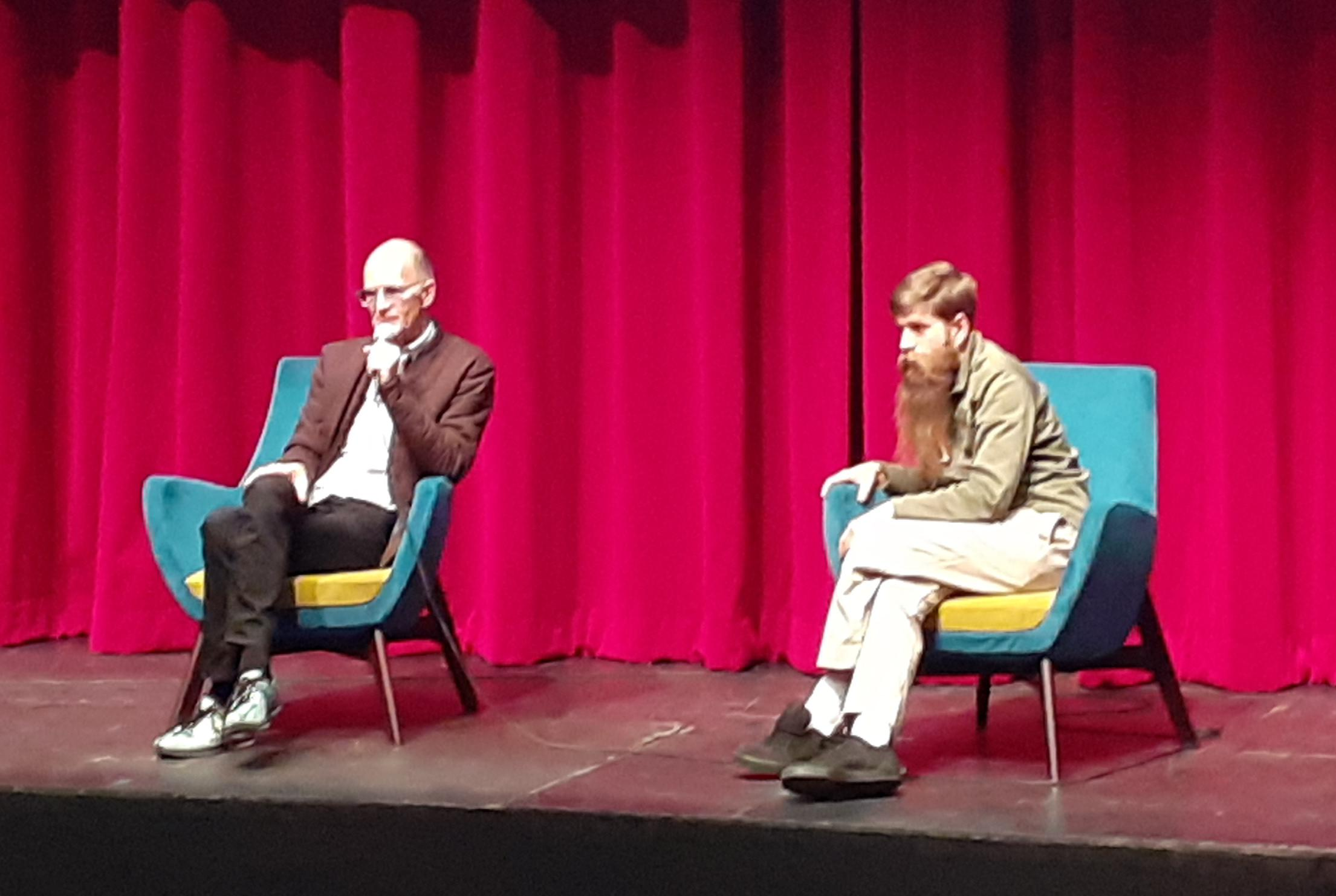
Mayell (left) and Gray taking questions on Whakamana at the University of Canterbury, October 2019

In mid-2019 the museum left Dunedin and relocated to Christchurch. Gray teamed with Michael Mayell, a social entrepreneur and environmentalist known for founding the snack company Cookie Time. Mayell has an interest in the emerging hemp economy and argues that it could allow New Zealand to reduce its reliance on dairy farming.

The museum was housed in Shand's Emporium building on Manchester Street in Christchurch, having been relocated from its original site in Hereford Street and adjoined to the neighbouring Trinity Church, with plans to restore the church as the central space for the museum. Both buildings are among the oldest in Christchurch and had required restoration following the 2011 Christchurch Earthquake. The museum briefly hosted and operated a Cannabis Social Club, which was New Zealand's only functioning club in 2019.

Whakamana positioned itself as a venue for the public to access resources on cannabis and hemp. During this time, the museum hosted talks by some cannabis specialists, including activists and green fairies such as Rose Renton.

==== Crowdfunding campaign ====
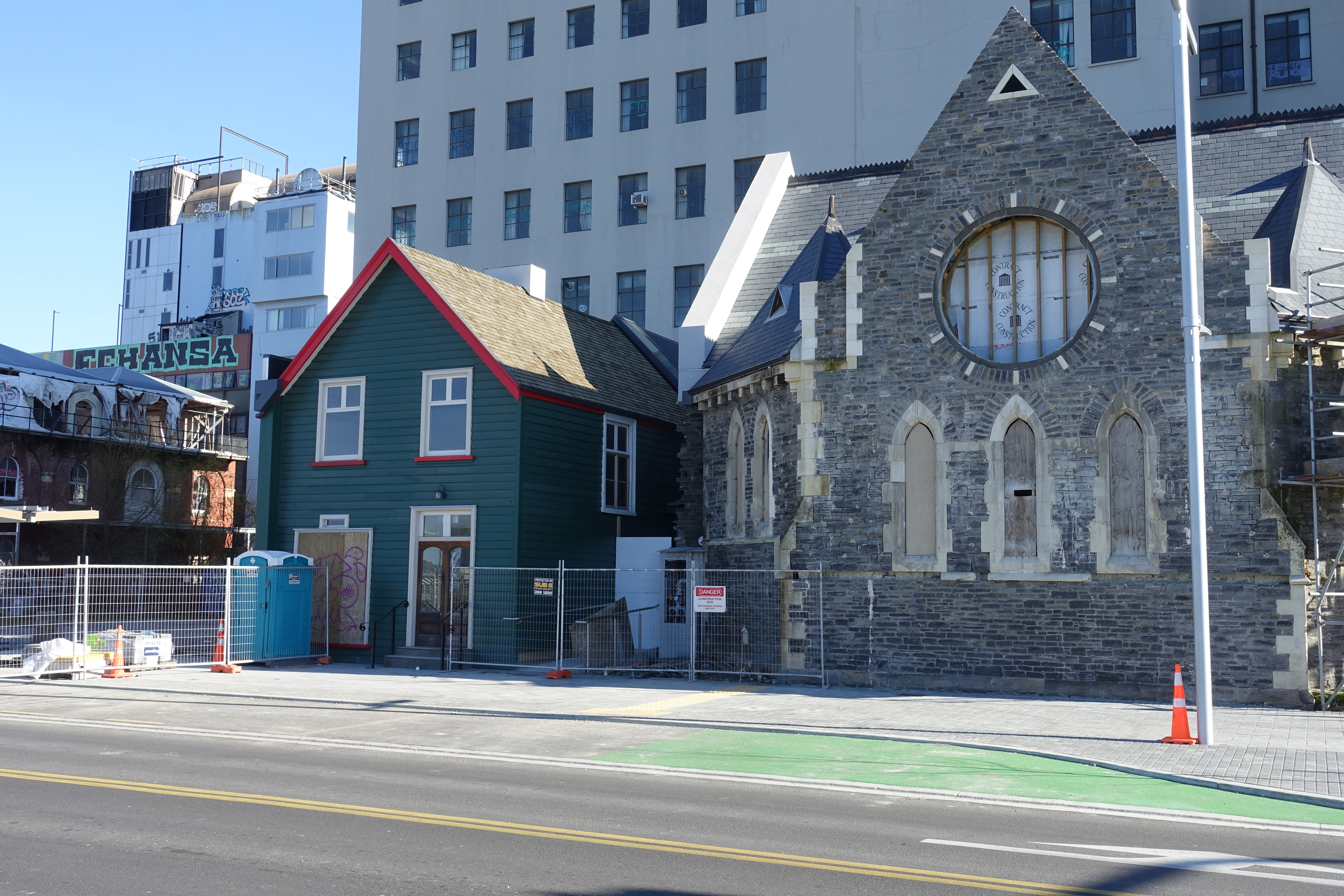
Shand's Emporium being restored next to Trinity Church in 2018

In a press release, Gray and Mayell announced plans to raise $1 million NZD via the crowdfunding platform PledgeMe to complete the Trinity Church restoration and expand their services and resources, offering one share per dollar at a minimum of fifty shares. The campaign went live in late 2019.

By the end of the fundraising period the campaign had raised $214,616 (NZD) from 299 people. However, the campaign had failed to raise its minimum target of $1 million NZD, therefore the total amount was returned to investors in accordance with the terms of PledgeMe. Gray initially attributed the failure of the campaign to a lack of awareness about the project among the local cannabis community, but argued in a later interview that prevailing cannabis stigma had played a role.

Following the failure of the campaign, Gray and Mayell said they were approaching investors and seeking alternative means of funding, and would seek overseas investors if suitable New Zealand investors could not be found. After deciding it was untenable to continuing leasing the Manchester Street premises, and with continued revenue issues, Whakamana announced they would close their Christchurch premises permanently. In 2020, Gray had intended to revive the project in Wellington, but the project failed to launch due to the emerging COVID-19 pandemic, forcing the museum into storage in an indefinite hiatus.

=== 2023–present: Auckland revival ===
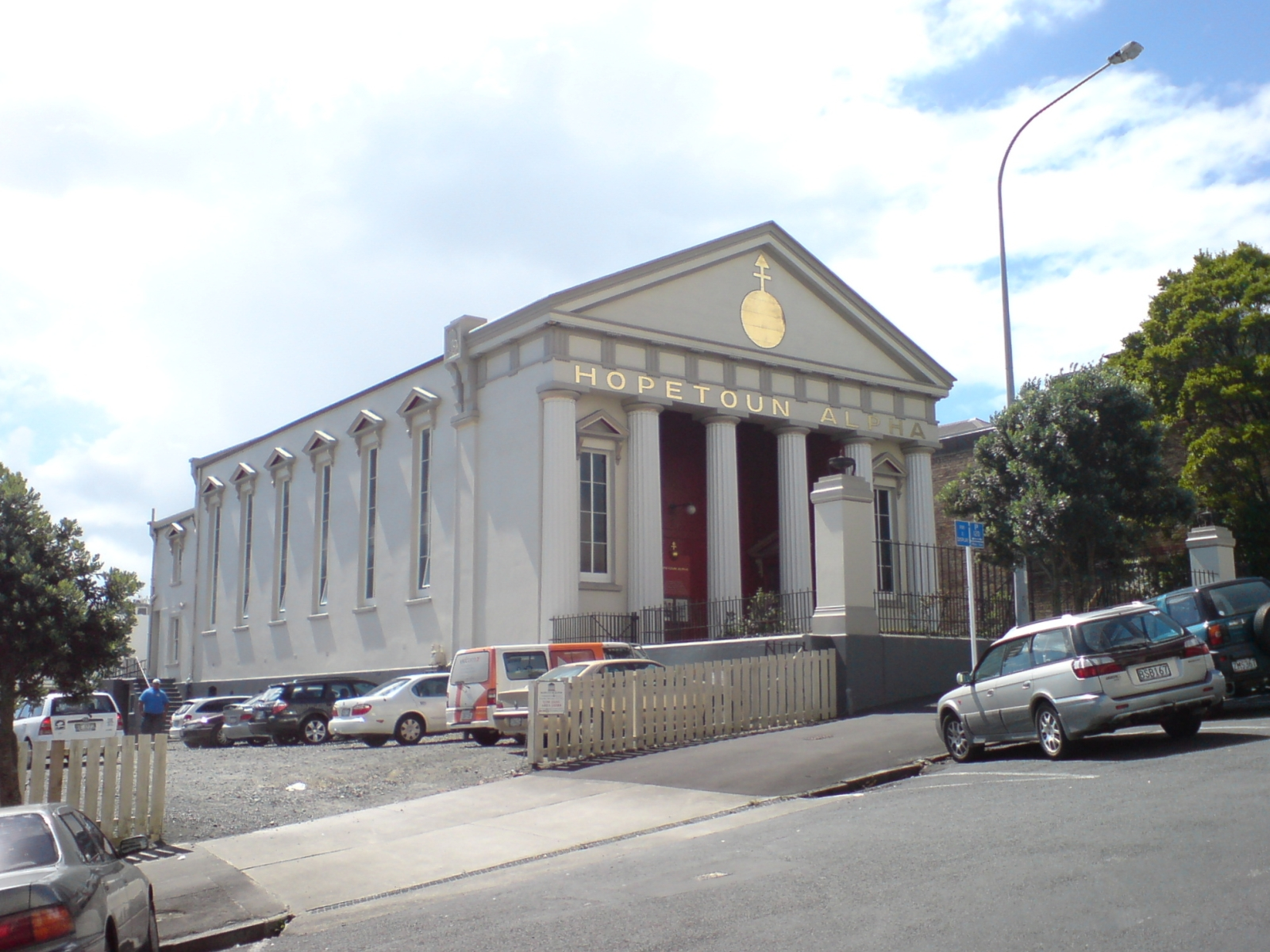
The Hopetoun Alpha building in 2008, where Whakamana opened in 2024

In 2023, Gray launched a fundraiser to revive the museum in Auckland, intending to find a permanent home for the project in the Hopetoun Alpha heritage building. The event was held on 12 August and described as a "VIP gala", attended by cannabis activists, experts and media figures, including Russell Brown who played a DJ set. A wealthy donor reportedly gave the museum NZ$500,000 to support the project, allowing the museum to remain at the site.

On 9 August 2024, Whakamana was officially re-opened by Chloe Swarbrick in a ribbon cutting ceremony. The building was nicknamed the "Green House" and also includes Calyx Clinic, a legal medicinal dispensary which operates from the site, as well as a "patient's social club."

== See more ==
- Cannabis in New Zealand
- List of museums in New Zealand
- Cannabis Museums
