= Michael Mayell =

Entrepreneur from New Zealand

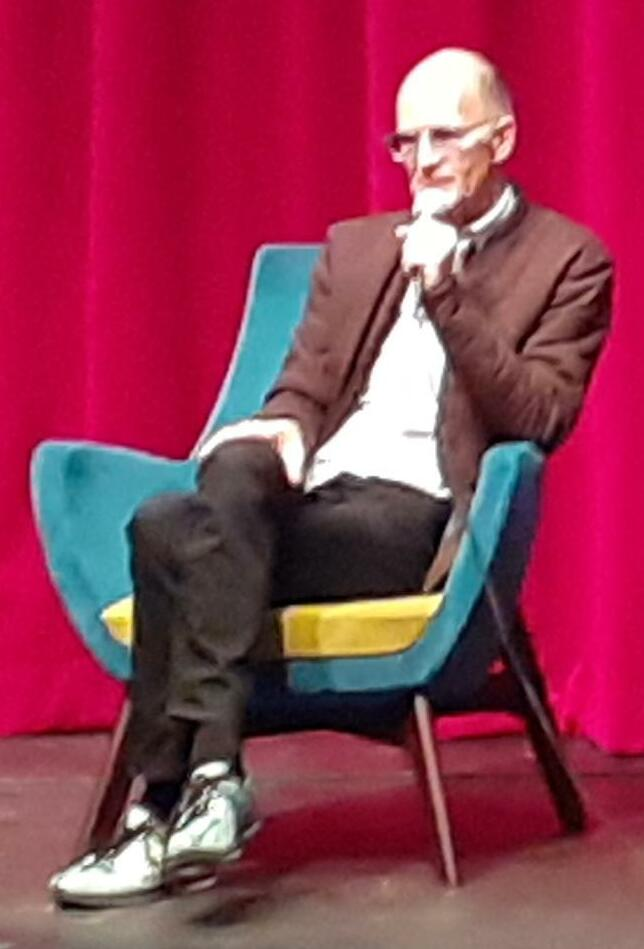
- Mayell speaking at the University of Canterbury in 2019
- Born: Michael Edward John Mayell; 9 May 1961 (age 64); Dunedin, New Zealand
- Education: Lincoln College (dropped out)
- Occupation: Social entrepreneur
- Known for: Cookie Time
- Website: michaelmayell.com

Michael Edward John Mayell (born 9 May 1961) is a New Zealand entrepreneur and environmentalist, best known for founding Cookie Time, a company he started in Christchurch in 1983 after dropping out of tertiary education. The company went on to become one of New Zealand's most recognised snack food brands. Mayell has founded several other businesses and projects since the 1980s, mainly in the software and health food industries, and has been connected to over 31 companies. Most of Mayell's later projects are social enterprises concerned with sustainable practices in agriculture and building, particularly hemp-based products, as a solution to the damaging effects of dairy farming.

In the 2000s, Mayell co-founded Springdoo and several other related software companies based on voice and messaging solutions for businesses, before selling it to UK-based Cityblock PLC, a company linked to former mobile content company Monstermob. In 2012, Mayell's tech projects ceased operations. Later that year, Mayell suffered a transient ischemic attack (a form of minor stroke) which he attributed to stress and lifestyle habits, prompting him to change his outlook.

Mayell's shift into social enterprise began in the late 2010s. In 2016, Mayell co-founded and launched Drinkable Rivers, a science-based campaign to monitor and improve the quality of New Zealand waterways, with the ultimate goal of making them safe to drink. The following year, he founded Nutrient Enterprise, a company which produces nutrient powder sachets using ingredients sourced from local growers. In 2019, Mayell partnered with cannabis activist Abe Gray in an unsuccessful effort to reestablish the Whakamana Cannabis Museum in Christchurch, which Mayell saw as a vessel to promote sustainable hemp foods.

Since the 2010s, Mayell has become known for his alternative lifestyle and environmental views. In 2022, Mayell moved to Golden Bay, pursuing a project to establish a communal ecovillage. The concept, dubbed NeighbourGood, was described in a manifesto which outlines a vision for a sociocratic community to be established in Takaka for up to 150 people. The project is ongoing.

== Early life ==
Michael Edward John Mayell was born on 9 May 1961 in Dunedin to Ted and Heather Mayell, and was raised in Christchurch. His father was a property investor and a general practitioner, and his mother was a social worker. He has a younger brother, Guy Pope-Mayell, with whom he started his first business in 1978 creating and selling garden refuse bags with a friend.

Mayell attended Christchurch Boys Highschool, then briefly attended Lincoln College pursuing a property management degree, but quit after 6 months because he didn't enjoy the course material. Mayell then studied a business diploma at a Christchurch polytechnic, but dropped out before graduating.

== Cookie Time ==
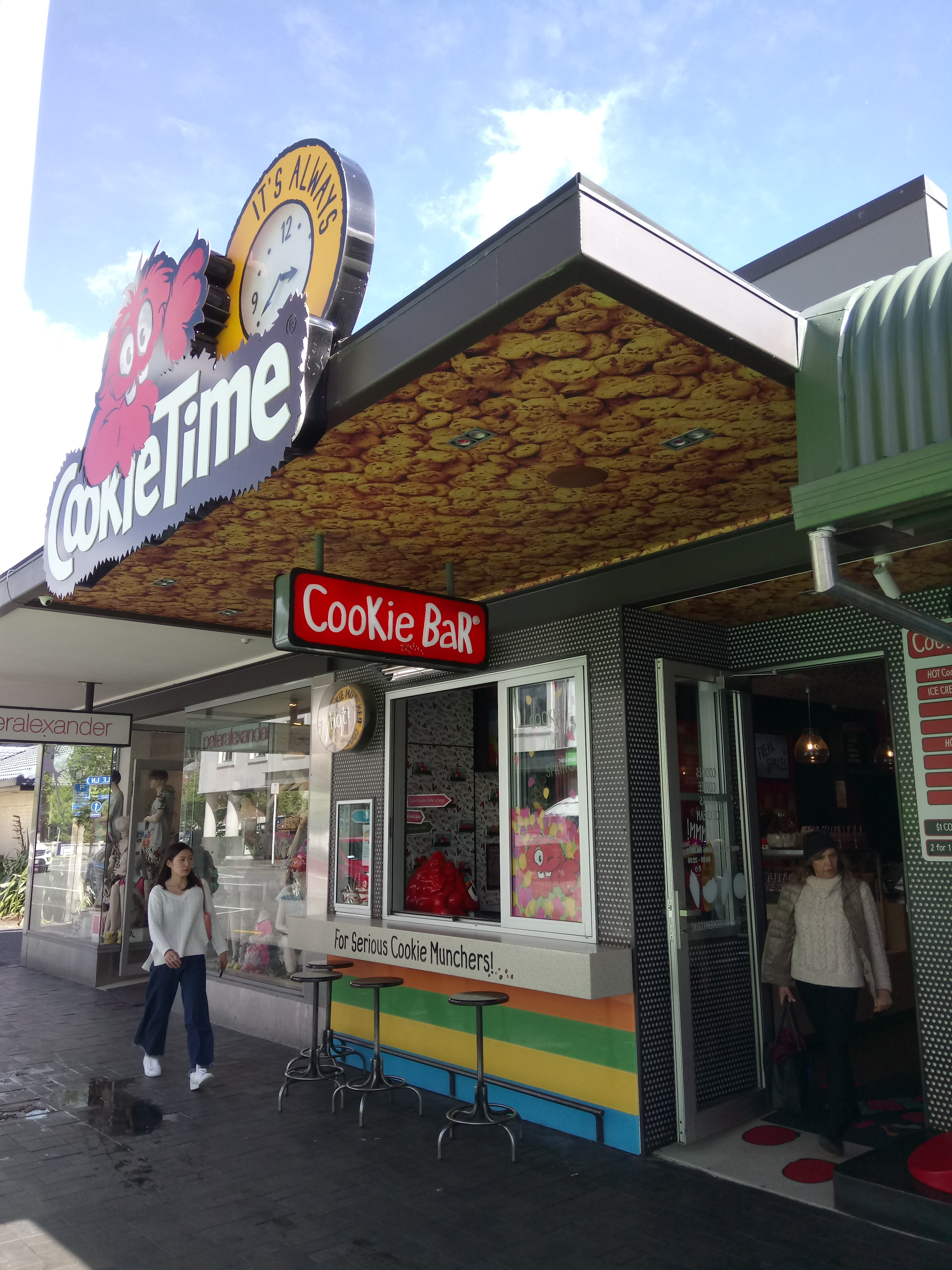
Cookie Time "cookie bar" store in Queenstown

In 1983 at the age of 21, Mayell dropped out of his business diploma at a Christchurch polytechnic, and started a cookie company venture out of his flat in Christchurch. His family helped bake the cookies, which were soon made available in 70 dairies around the city, with 5000 reportedly sold in the first week. Mayell is said to have driven around the city, persuading dairies to sell the cookies in large glass jars. His younger brother, Guy, helped co-found the business and would go on to become managing director.

Mayell has said he was inspired to start Cookie Time after trying Mrs. Fields cookies during a trip to Marin County. He described the idea as "nothing special," believing the success of the company was (in part) due to his ability to sell directly to small stores, cutting out costs and complications in the supply chain.

In 2003, Mayell and Guy started the Cookie Time Charitable Trust, aiming to help children with their passions and talents.

Cookie Time has subsequently become one of New Zealand's most well-known brands, opening physical "cookie bar" stores and entering the international market. The company exports to over 10 countries globally, and opened its first international store in Tokyo in 2013. As of 2025, the business remains owned by Mayell and his brother, Guy.

== Social enterprise ==
In 2016, Mayell co-founded and launched Drinkable Rivers, a campaign to improve and monitor water quality, with the aim of making some public waterways safe to drink from. Mayell has remained a supporter of the project since its inception.

In 2017, Mayell launched Nutrient Rescue, which produces nutrient powder sachets for creating healthy drinks, intended to be taken as shots. The ingredients are sourced from local growers.

In 2019, Mayell partnered with cannabis activist Abe Gray to relaunch the Whakamana Cannabis Museum in Christchurch. The project failed to raise enough funds through crowdfunding, however a smaller museum was opened in the former Shand's Emporium building. Mayell advocated for growing hemp as a way to help clean New Zealand waterways, and was interested in the project in terms of education and promoting hemp-based foods, particularly as it coincided with the 2020 cannabis referendum. The project was unable to find investors and create a revenue stream, and closed following the disruption caused by the COVID-19 pandemic.

In 2024, Mayell partnered with Igor Botelho to launch what they claim is New Zealand's first "regenerative food", a product which uses ingredients that have environmental benefits during the growth process. The product is named Help, a portmanteau of its two ingredients, kelp and hemp. It is primarily made from crushed hemp seeds, but uses 4% kelp grown in Akaroa Harbour.

== Other notable ventures ==
=== Business software (2003–2010) ===
In the 2000s, Mayell launched several software products and companies in the messaging and voice analysis space, including Telemessenger, Springdoo, SantaCall, and Aristotle; the underlying software cost between NZ$2M – 3M to develop. With the exception of SantaCall (a Santa Claus phone service aimed at children), these products were intended for business use, providing tools for phone calls, email, and "personal mentoring" using voice recognition and messaging technology.

Springdoo, which Mayell co-founded with Jason Kerr, was sold to Cityblock PLC, a UK-based company linked to Monstermob. Mayell claimed he rejected offers worth millions on his other companies in 2008. Telemessenger ceased operations in 2012, and Mayell has since described his foray into software as a learning experience.

=== One Square Meal ===
In 2005, Mayell helped launch a meal replacement bar, One Square Meal (OSM), in connection with Cookie Time. The product received a patent and is marketed as having a third of the recommended daily nutrients a person needs, hence its name.

=== NeighbourGood ===
Mayell revealed in 2024 that he was working on a concept for a regenerative ecovillage. The project is named NeighbourGood and was described in a "living manifesto", which outlines a vision for a communal sociocracy. In an interview with The Press, Mayell described himself as the "initiator" of the project, which aims to establish itself in Golden Bay outside of Tākaka and support up to 150 people. Mayell moved to Golden Bay in 2022 to help realise the project.

== Personal life ==
Mayell has three children and is also a stepfather. He has been married twice. He is an environmentalist and a proponent of eco housing, hemp-based products, and renewables. In particular, he has advocated for efforts to address water pollution in New Zealand rivers and beaches and is critical of the environment impact caused by dairy farming. He is a co-founder and supporter of Drinkable Rivers, a campaign to make some waterways in New Zealand drinkable again.

In 2012, Mayell suffered a form of minor stroke known as a transient ischemic attack. He attributed it to alcohol consumption and interpersonal stress, and described it as a "wake-up call" to change his life. Mayell has been "spiritual" for much of his life, and began living an alternative lifestyle in the 2010s, which has been well-documented in interviews. He adheres to a vegan diet, practices meditation and chooses to not wear shoes where possible. He claims to witness the sunrise every morning, and has been described as a "minimalist monk".

Mayell lives modestly, and moved into a small camper van in 2021. Subsequently, he has built a single-room hempcrete caravan that he resides in. Having lived most of his life in Christchurch, Mayell moved to Golden Bay / Mohua in 2022 as part of his plans to live off-grid and develop an ecovillage.

Throughout the 1990s and 2000s, Mayell was a fan of gadgets and an early adopter of new technologies. He has a small collection of portable devices, which includes the first iPod, a Psion Organiser, and an Apple Newton, among others.
