= Antony Gough =

New Zealand businessperson (born 1949)

Anthony Thomas Gough
- Born: 1949 (age 76–77); Christchurch New Zealand
- Occupation: Property Developer

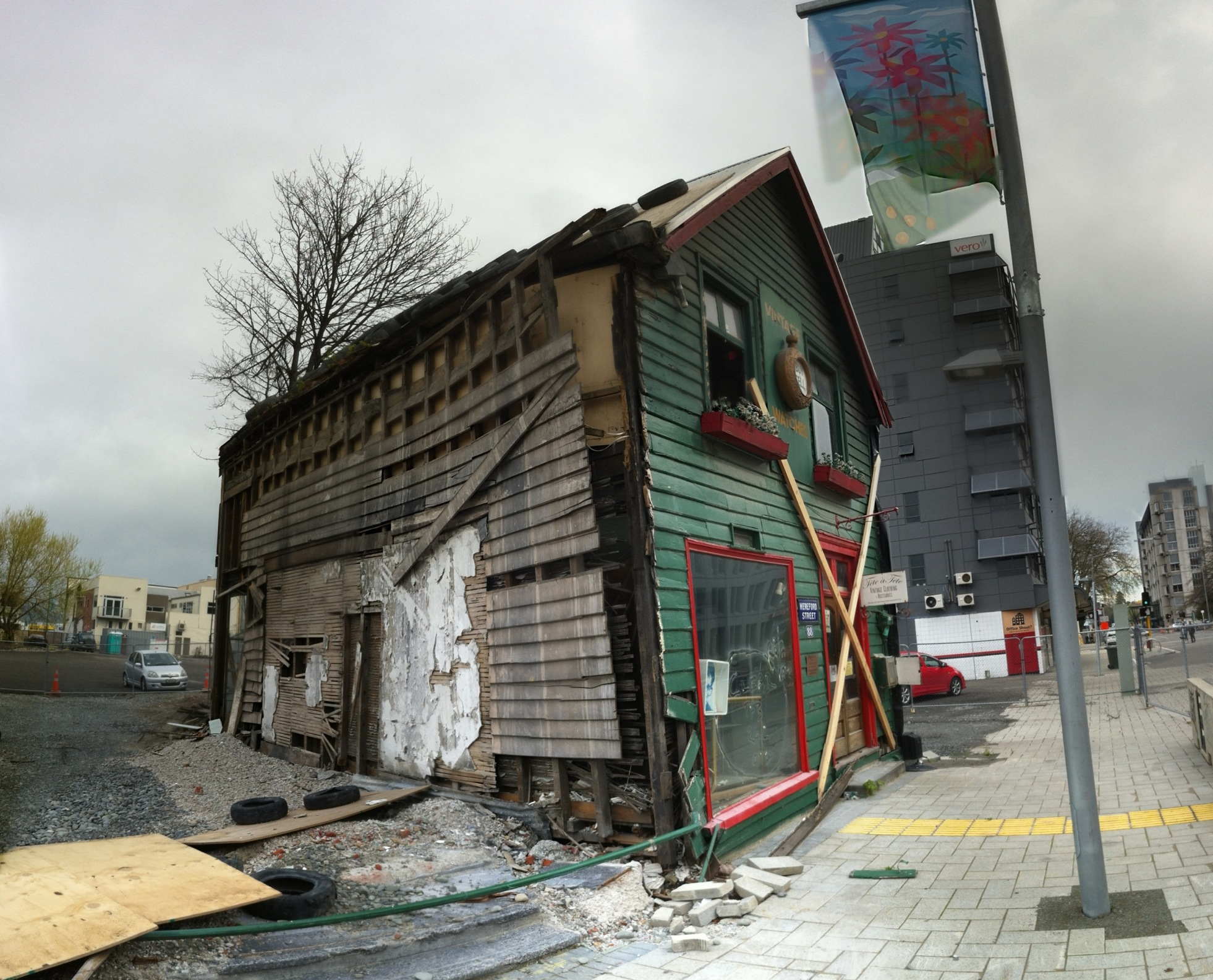
Gough gave Shand's Emporium, the oldest commercial building in the Christchurch Central City, to a Christchurch heritage trust and it was relocated to Manchester Street

Antony Thomas Gough (born 1949) is a New Zealand businessman and property developer based in Christchurch. The grandson of Tracy Thomas Gough, who founded Gough, Gough and Hamer, Gough is considered to be one of the city's most influential businessmen. He is the developer of The Terrace, a major commercial development in Christchurch's retail district and part of the city's reconstruction programme following the 2011 earthquake.

== Biography ==
Gough was born in Christchurch on 8 April 1949. He was educated at Christ's College from 1962 to 1966. He graduated from the University of Canterbury with a Bachelor of Science in 1970 with honours in nuclear science, and was awarded an honorary doctorate in commerce in April 2014 from the same institution.

Gough, his brothers Tracy Gough and Harcourt Gough, and his twin sister Avenal McKinnon were part-owners of Gough Holdings Ltd, previously known as Gough, Gough and Hamer. The company supplied heavy equipment for the mining, forestry, transport and power industries in Australasia and employed 950 staff.

In 2013, an attempt of the B T Gough Trust to obtain a controlling stake of Gough Holdings Ltd through gaining shareholding of the O T Gough Trust went to the High Court. The National Business Review estimates the value of the Gough family at NZ$300m.

The Gough family owned Shand's Emporium in Hereford Street, the oldest commercial building in the Christchurch Central City, from circa 1940. Gough sold the Category I heritage building for $1 as it was in the way of The Terrace development, and it was transported to a new site in Manchester Street.
