= Avenal McKinnon =

New Zealand art historian (1949–2021)

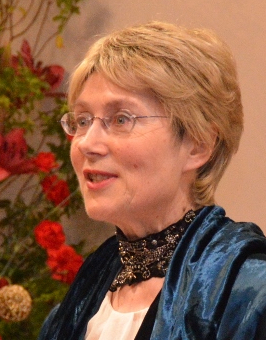
McKinnon in 2013

Avenal Beryl Elizabeth McKinnon MNZM (née Gough; 8 April 1949 – 12 March 2021) was a New Zealand art historian and writer. She was the founding director of the New Zealand Portrait Gallery Te Pūkena Whakaata.

== Biography ==
McKinnon was born and raised in Christchurch and attended Woodford House in Havelock North, in the North Island, from 1962 to 1966. She completed a degree in English literature at the University of Canterbury followed by a post-graduate art history course at London's Courtauld Institute of Art. In the 1970s, she worked at the Tate, cataloguing the modern British collection.

She was appointed the first director of the New Zealand Portrait Gallery in 2005, retiring in 2014. During her tenure, the gallery expanded its permanent collection from six works to more than 200. It also moved into dedicated premises in Shed 11 on Queen's Wharf.

McKinnon is considered an expert on the work of New Zealand artist Frances Hodgkins and wrote articles and exhibition catalogues on her work.

McKinnon died in Wellington on 12 March 2021, aged 71 years.

== Personal life ==
McKinnon was the daughter of property developer Owen Gough, and granddaughter of industrialist Tracy "T.T." Gough. She had a twin brother, Antony Gough, and two older brothers, Tracy and Harcourt. She was married to New Zealand diplomat John McKinnon.

== Honours and awards ==
In the 2015 New Year Honours, McKinnon was appointed a Member of the New Zealand Order of Merit, for services to the arts. In 2018, Woodford House awarded her the Tempus Award for outstanding achievement by a former student in her field.

== Publications ==
- Hodgkins, F., McKinnon, A., & Whitford and Hughes. (1990). Frances Hodgkins, 1869–1947: 17 July – 14 August 1990, held at Whitford and Hughes, London. London: Whitford and Hughes.
- Hodgkins, F., McKinnon, A., Trim, P., & Mahara Gallery. (2000). Frances Hodgkins: The link with Kapiti : the Field Collection. Waikanae: Mahara Gallery.
- Welch, S. M., Alley, E., McKinnon, A., & New Zealand Portrait Gallery. (2008). Stephen Martyn Welch: 'the sitting' : 18 December 2008 to 21 January 2009. Wellington, N.Z: New Zealand Portrait Gallery.
