= Lolly cake =

New Zealand cake

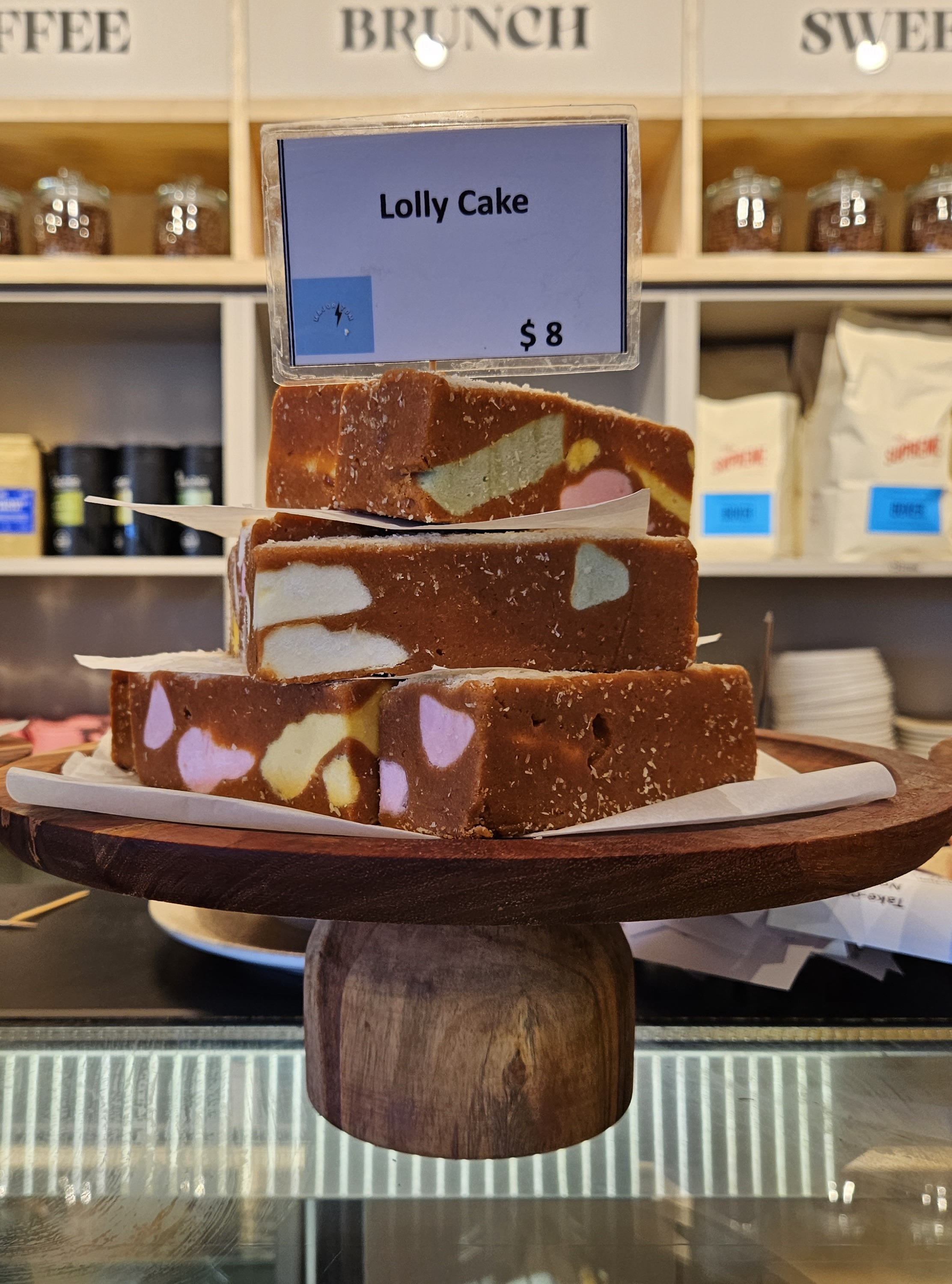
- Lolly cake slices for sale at Westfield Albany, Auckland
- Alternative names: Lolly log
- Type: Cake or confection
- Place of origin: New Zealand
- Created by: 1940s
- Main ingredients: Malt biscuits, butter, sweetened condensed milk, fruit puff sweets (usually Explorer lollies)

A lolly cake or lolly log is an unbaked New Zealand sweet dish that features malt, butter, and lollies (typically explorer candy or fruit puff sweets) as key ingredients.

== Origins ==
The exact origins of lolly cake are unknown. Lolly cakes are known to have been consumed in the 1940s, but were not commonly available until the 1960s in supermarkets. Lolly cake is similar to chocolate salami and fifteens.

== Recipe ==
Traditionally, explorer lollies (known as eskimo lollies before 2021) or fruit puffs are used, which are like firm, but soft and chewy, marshmallows. They are added to the base mixture, which consists of crushed plain malt biscuits combined with melted butter and sweetened condensed milk. The mixture is usually pressed into a log shape and rolled in desiccated coconut, and then refrigerated until set and sliced. Other ingredients can be added or substituted.

== Availability ==
Lolly cakes can be found in most New Zealand supermarkets, bakeries and some dairies and petrol stations. In July 2021, Canterbury cookie company Cookie Time introduced a lolly cake biscuit in supermarkets and other retailers. Night 'n Day was the first retailer to sell it.

== Gallery ==
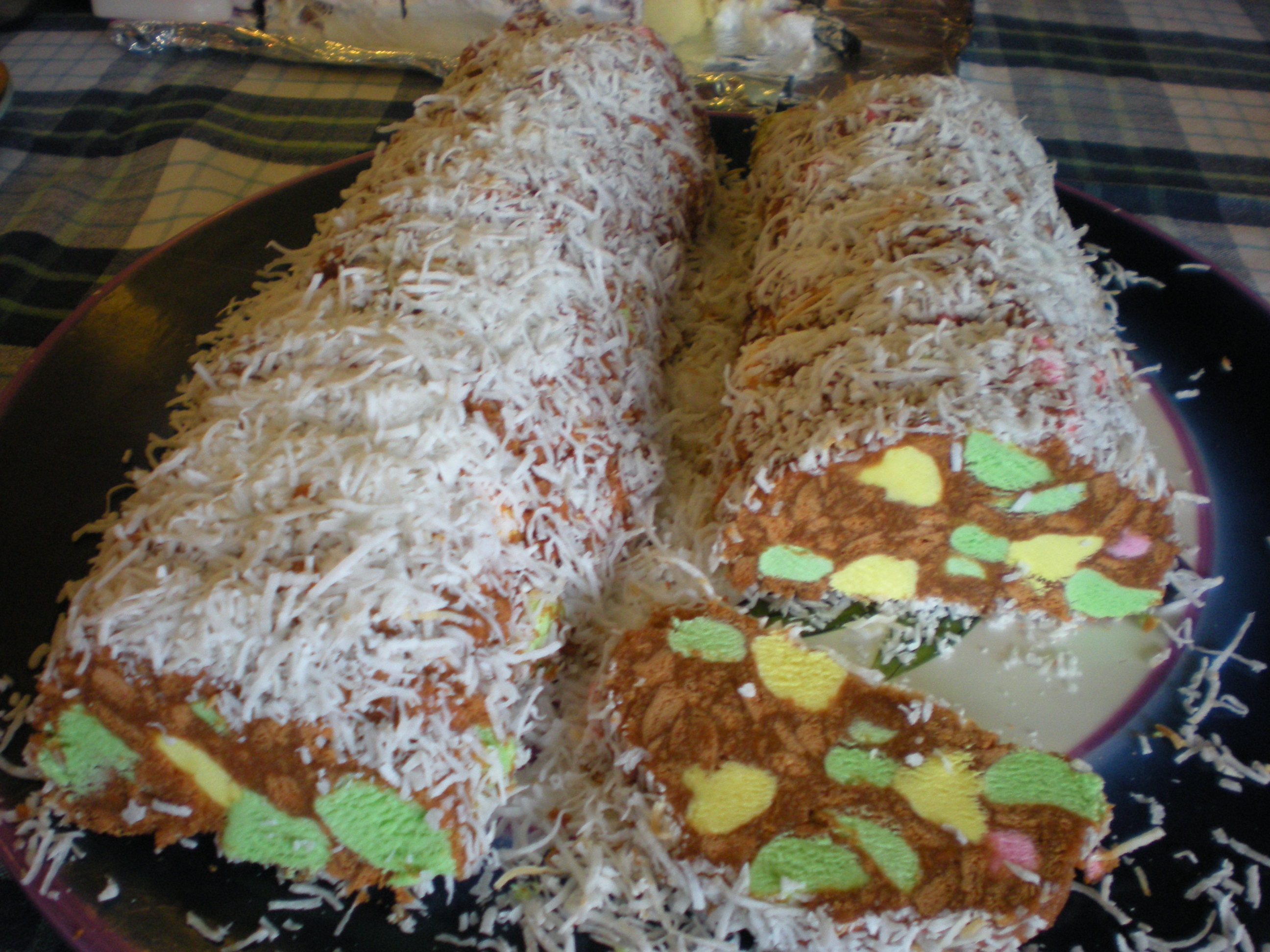
Sliced lolly cake, with a coconut coating

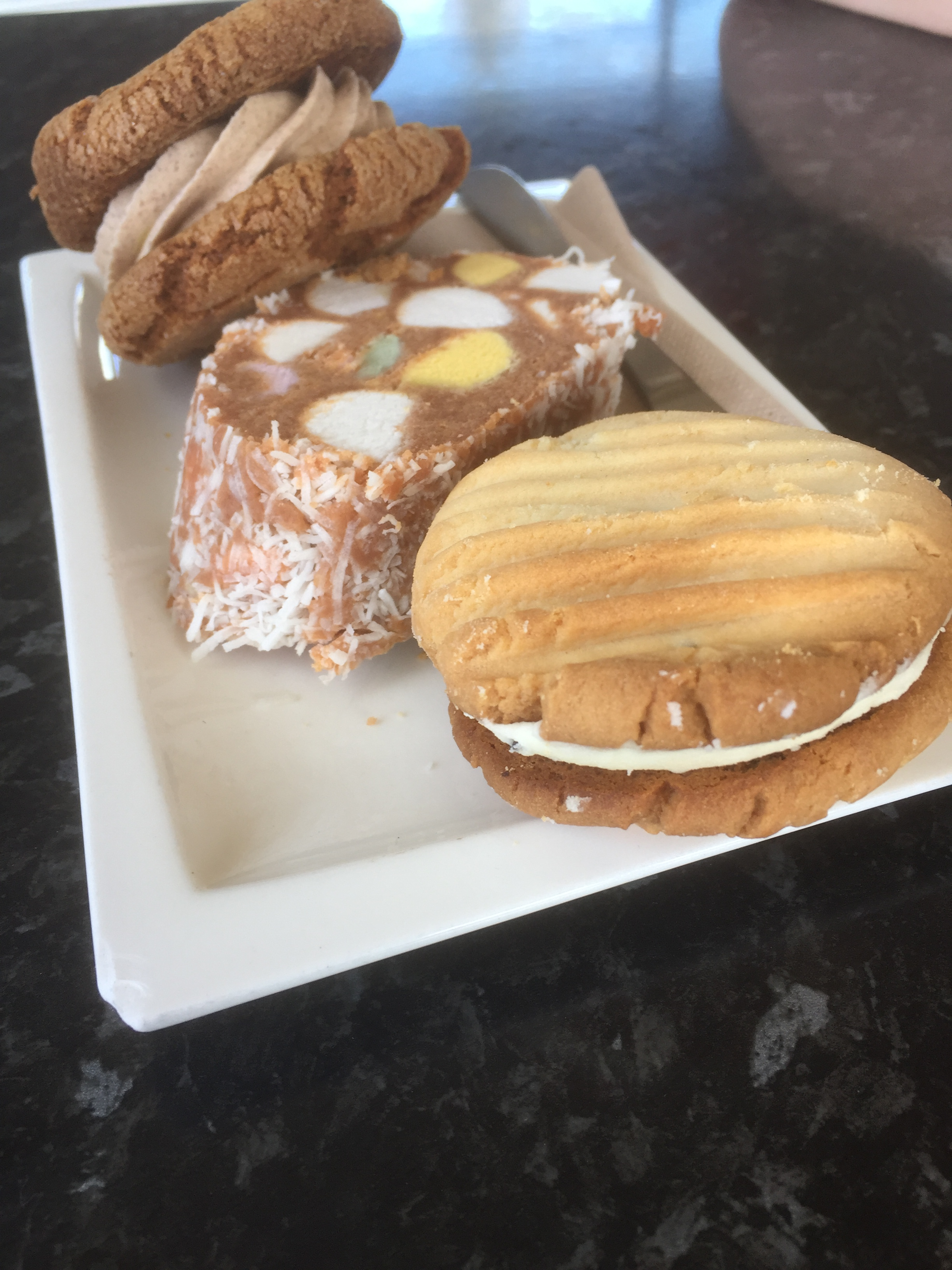
A selection of café cakes including lolly cake from Waimate
