= Otago NORML =

The Otago NORML logo uses an alternative Otago University shield, with cannabis leaves and the Zig-Zag logo substituted for the usual stars. The motto, "Cannabis Maximus" translates roughly to "the greatest cannabis".

Otago University NORML (also known as simply Otago NORML or NORML Dunedin) is a pro-cannabis law reform student club at the University of Otago, affiliated to the Otago University Students Association. It is not affiliated to the national New Zealand cannabis law reform organisation NORML New Zealand, an affiliate of the National Organization for the Reform of Marijuana Laws (NORML).

Most members are students or recent graduates of the University of Otago in Dunedin, New Zealand.

== History ==
The history of Otago NORML is covered in the 2015 feature documentary Druglawed.

=== 1970s ===
Sally Caswell investigates the effects of cannabis intoxication on subjects volunteered from among the ranks of Otago NORML.

=== 1980s ===
Radio One begins broadcasting including in the schedule a NORML radio show run by members of the Otago University branch.

=== 2000s ===
In 2000 Otago University Students Association (OUSA) passed a motion at an SGM that the association would officially support cannabis law reform in New Zealand.

In 2003 members of Otago NORML marched to the Dunedin Central Police Station and hot-boxed the main foyer as part of the annual 'J-Day' protest. Around 50 people smoked cannabis inside the police station, resulting in no arrests. Cannabis plants were also planted in the front garden of the station. When asked about their inaction in the Otago Daily Times, Inspector Dave Campbell of the Dunedin Police said they 'had better things to do'.

In 2004 the Dunedin Police Station was again hotboxed, this time by around 100 people, again resulting in no arrests. Weekly cannabis smoking sessions were then initiated on the Otago University campus.

In 2006 more motions were passed through OUSA at a Students General Meeting '...that OUSA declares the University campus a 'Prohibition Free Zone' where prohibition of cannabis shall not apply', and 'that OUSA condones the public smoking of cannabis on University grounds as a protest against cannabis prohibition'.

In 2007 the University's Campus Watch security were called to remove the group. However, the protesters stood their ground. In the same year, the OUSA passed a motion to 'recognise and publicise the knowledge that alcohol use is more harmful than cannabis use'.

In 2008 the first annual Cannabis Awareness Week was held and Otago NORML stated they had unofficially renamed Dunedin 'Dunsterdam'. As a result, the University invited undercover police on to campus to surveil and attempt to disrupt Otago NORML's activities.

In September 2008 the group were the focus of campus wide attention over their initiative to instate a Cannabis Law Reform Representative on Otago University Students Association executive and to have the Association build an elevated 'smokers balcony' as part of the redevelopment of their Clubs and Societies Centre. There was considerable backlash against these initiatives and the final agenda for the Student General Meeting, held on 25 September, saw numerous motions seeking to remove official OUSA support for the group. The meeting was over 2 hours long and over 270 Association members were in attendance, one of the largest turnouts for an SGM in the association's history. In the end no motions were passed and the status quo was maintained, except for that the motion to 'recognise and publicise the knowledge that alcohol use is more harmful than cannabis use' was rescinded.

=== 2010s ===
In 2013, Otago NORML's former president Abe Gray founded the Whakamana Cannabis Museum, New Zealand's first and only cannabis museum.

== Cannabis protests ==
The group meets every Monday, Wednesday and Friday at 4:20pm to smoke cannabis as an act of protest against 'New Zealand's unjust cannabis prohibition laws'. It began as Friday only in 2004. Wednesday was added in 2008 and Monday was added in 2013. Over the last 14 years this practise has continued for, no arrests have occurred at the event. However members of the group have been targeted by police and arrested at other times. The group was placed under surveillance by the Dunedin Police Tactical Response Group sometime prior to May 2008. The fifth anniversary of the '420' protests was held on 11 September 2009 and was briefly attended by Police, but no arrests were made. This interaction is captured in the 2015 feature documentary Druglawed.

=== 2008 ===
After considerable media and police interest, several trespass notices were issued to non-student members and the group leader was charged for cannabis offences at a market day. The leader initially pleaded not-guilty to all charges, but later pleaded guilty to possessing cannabis and resisting and obstructing police in February 2009, leading him to be discharged without conviction on all charges in December 2009.

==== Initial confrontations with authorities ====
Members of Otago University NORML (Otago NORML) came to the attention of the New Zealand Police after a series of incidents involving the Otago University private security service Campus Watch. The Campus Watch had attempted to prevent club members from congregating on the Otago University Union Lawn and smoking cannabis on Fridays throughout late 2007. As a result, the group began smoking cannabis on Wednesdays as well. When students continued smoking cannabis on University property, Otago University administrative authorities called in the Police.

==== Beginning of undercover surveillance ====
Otago NORML members had suspected police surveillance of their twice weekly '420 smoke-up protest' group from as early as February 2008. This suspicion was officially confirmed in June 2008 when a Police visited the 420 protest for the first time. During this June incident several non-students were trespassed from the University campus. When one of the people who had been trespassed attempted to re-enter the campus, three plainclothes police officers attempted to enforce the trespass order. This was met by outrage from the wider protest group, who photographed the police officers.

==== Arrests ====
In July 2008, the leader of Otago NORML was arrested for smoking cannabis at a Market Day on the University Union Lawn. The search powers of the officers was contested at the time by the arrestee, and the ensuing verbal altercation attracted considerable attention from the Market Day crowd. Several students attempted to physically prevent the officers from conducting the arrest. Plainclothes officers emerged from the student crowd and began to assist with the arrest and crowd control as they waited for additional police units to arrive. The arrest was covered on the front page of the local newspaper, the Otago Daily Times. The arrest and its backstory are presented in the 2015 New Zealand documentary Druglawed.

==== Posters ====
The 'Narkiology' Tui billboard

Several weeks later, posters titled "Narkiology 101 – How To Spot a Nark" began to appear around the Otago University campus showing the pictures, names and badge identification numbers of the five plainclothes police officers dressed up as students that had so far been identified. In late 2008 the popular Tui beer brand ran one of their famous 'Yeah Right!' billboards in the Dunedin student quarter that referred to ‘Narkiology.'

== Notable members ==
- Abe Gray, founder of the Whakamana Cannabis Museum, high-profile cannabis activist and protester for almost two decades, served as Otago NORML president.

== See also ==
- Cannabis in New Zealand
- Student activism
