= Night 'n Day =

New Zealand grocery store chain

- Type: Convenience store chain
- Industry: Groceries
- Founded: 1984; 42 years ago in Dunedin, New Zealand
- Founder: Denise and Andrew Lane
- Headquarters: Dunedin, New Zealand
- Area served: New Zealand
- Owner: Night 'n Day Foodstores Limited
- Parent: Two Four Holdings Limited

Night 'n Day is a chain of New Zealand convenience stores. The stores operate long hours, and sell a range of ready-to-eat products.

Night 'n Day is the third largest grocery retailer in New Zealand. Since 2011, it has rapidly expanded its network of stores and focused more on coffee and takeaway food. During the 2010s, it was one of the fastest-growing companies in New Zealand by revenue. As of 2024 there are 54 Night 'n Day stores around New Zealand.

== History ==
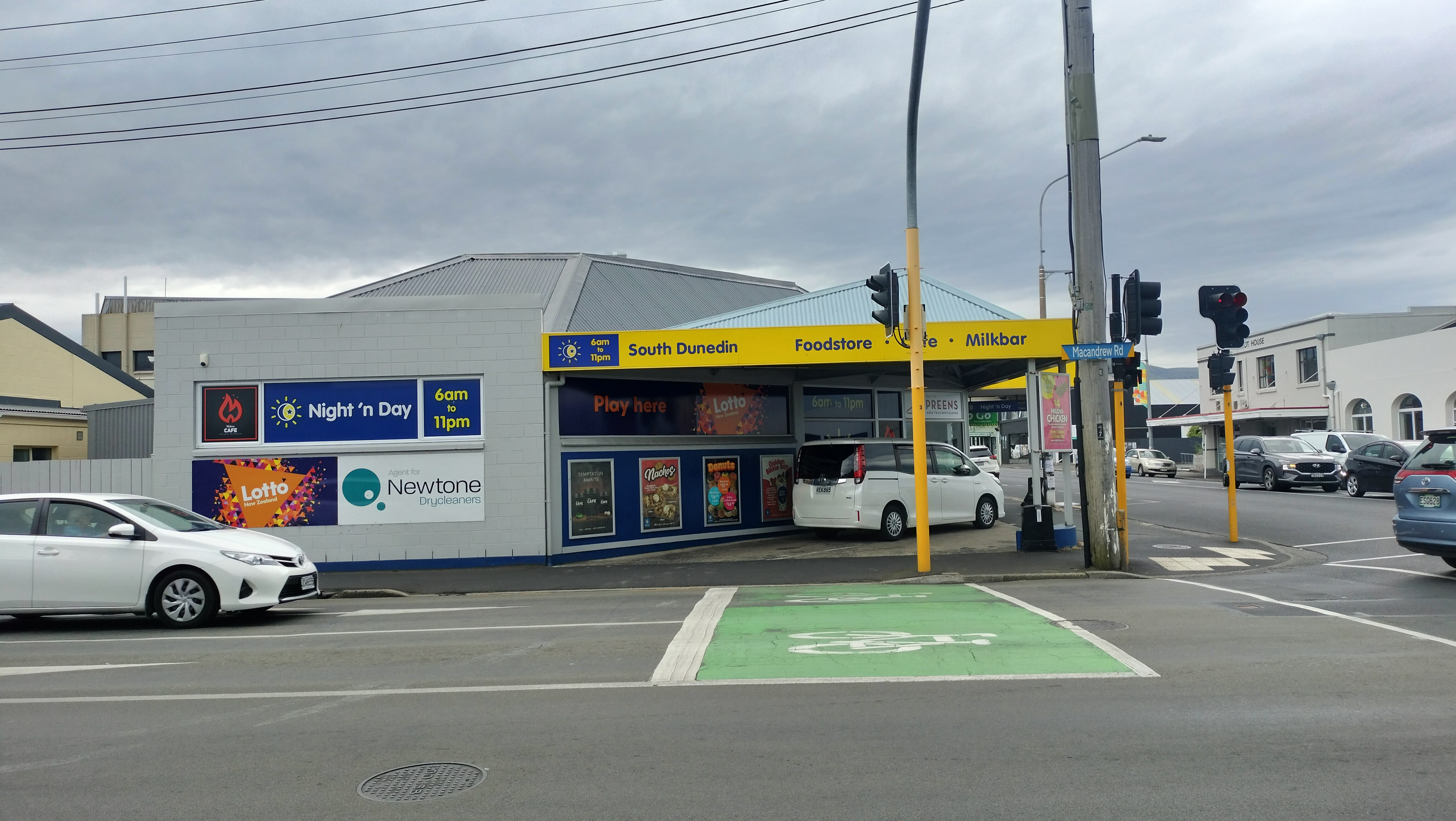
Night 'N Day grocery store in South Dunedin

=== Denise and Andrew Lane era (1984–2011) ===
Denise and Andrew Lane opened the Regent Foodstore on Regent Street, in the University of Otago in Dunedin North, in 1984. After hearing a BP across the road was planning to operate 24 hours a day, the Lanes decided to do the same, becoming the first New Zealand shop to open 24 hours a day. Business started to pick up after six months, and local students and motel residents came to call the store "The Two Four".

The store became the first Night 'n Day store. Additional 24-hour Night 'n Day stores were opened in Hagley Park, Christchurch and in Georgetown, Invercargill in 1985, and Sumner, Christchurch in 1986. An Arrowtown store was added in 1990.

The Lanes choose to franchise the brand in 1990, on the advice of NightOwl Convenience Stores brand owner Rod Craig. The move led to a growth in the chain's store numbers and revenue.

By 2011, Night 'n Day had 46 stores.

Three Night 'n Day stores were affected by the 2011 Canterbury earthquake. One relocated, while the other two closed permanently. Night 'n Day has never restored its previous presence in Christchurch CBD.

In late 2011, Night 'n Day took over the 21 Woolworths at Gull stores at Gull New Zealand service stations around the upper North Island, adding 21 North Island sites to its existing network of 25 South Island stores. Foodstuffs South Island ended its supply agreement with Night 'n Day as a result, leading Night 'n Day to shift its focus to hot food and coffee.

=== Tony Allison era (2012–2019) ===
Tony Allison, nephew of founders Denise and Andrew Lane, became the company's first chief executive in February 2012.

By 2013, the chain had 46 stores around the country, including five company-owned stores. It had about 750 staff and was one of the fastest growing "mature" business in the lower South Island in 2013.

One of the chain's stores on George Street, Dunedin closed in 2013. However, the chain continued to grow to 50 stores in 2016, following the opening of stores in Lawrence, Wānaka and Nelson Central.

Five former Star Mart stores in Wellington CBD were converted to Night 'n Day stores in 2017, becoming the chain's first standalone stores in the North Island. These stores had high turnover, boosting the chain's national revenue.

By the late 2010s, the company was regularly achieving high rankings in Deloitte's annual list of the fastest growing New Zealand companies by revenue. The Lane family owned eight of the chain's 56 stores. Two to four new stores were being opened each year. Andrew Lane still hoped to open stores in 20 other locations in the South Island.

=== Matthew Lane era (April 2019–) ===
Allison left the company in April 2019, and Denise and Andrew's son Matthew Lane took over as general manager. By 2020, Night 'n Day was still being run by the Lane family. It had 26 support staff, 36 franchisees, 52 sites and about 600 staff across its national network.

The COVID-19 pandemic had a significant impact on many Night 'n Day stores. Under Alert Level Four, they were not allowed to sell major products like coffee, milkshakes and heated food.

In late 2021, Night 'n Day was the third largest grocery retailer in New Zealand after Woolworths and Foodstuffs. The company submitted to a Commerce Commission inquiry into the two companies' duopoly, calling for a separation between retailers and wholesalers. Night 'n Day, along with The Warehouse and other retailers, expressed an interest in taking a greater role in the grocery market if the duopoly was broken up.

As of 2022, Denise and Andrew Lane's three children were all still heavily involved in the business.

== Products ==
While Night 'n Day is a grocery chain, it has shifted its focus to ready-to-eat products since 2011. The chain introduced its own coffee and food brand, Helova Coffee, in 2010, and began selling its own Helova branded frozen yoghurt, cream freeze, slushies, fudge and tea in 2015. General manager Matthew Lane identifies three pillars to the business in 2019: milk bar products, fresh food and deli foods, and coffee.

The chain offers a range of products via UberEats and other delivery apps, including meal combos, snack food, pizza, pies, milkshakes, coffees, ice creams, deserts, drinks, and basic groceries like milk and bread.

In 2017, Queenstown's Church Street store lost its alcohol license, after the district licensing committee deemed that it was not a "grocery store". It considered the Wikipedia article on "groceries" and dictionary definitions of "grocery" in its decision. It also considered the lack of fresh meat and potatoes during its two visits, the 24-hour nature of the shop, and the dominance of convenience food and confectionery.

In the same year, the company also withdrew an application to renew its liquor license for its flagship store on Dunedin's Regent Street due to opposition from the University of Otago and the Dunedin City Council Licensing Office for reasons including the inability to provide key documents such as certified annual sales data. In that case, the district licensing committee was unable to consider whether Night 'n Day was actually a grocery store or a convenience store, as listed on the company’s website for its stores nationwide and thus able to sell alcohol.

Pre-packaged salads sold at Night 'n Day and other grocery retailers were recalled due to potential listeria contamination in January 2021.

The chain was excluded from a 2021 nutrition study of New Zealand fast food chains, as no nutritional information of its products was available in-store or online.

In July 2021, Night 'n Day was the first retailer to start selling Cookie Time's lolly cake biscuit.

Some Night 'n Day stores have Lotto New Zealand counters. The Richmond store has the second highest number of winners, making it a popular place to buy tickets for a $38 million draw in August 2020.

According to the owner of the Blenheim store, tobacco and vaping products continue to be lucrative, despite falling sales and minors regularly attempting to buy the products.

== Opening hours ==
The first group of Night 'n Day stores opened 24 hours a day, including on public holidays. Many stores are now open from early morning until late, seven days a week.

Night 'n Day stores open on Christmas Day, as they aren't bound by the laws governing supermarkets and other businesses. Timaru's Park store has used a range of approaches to cover Christmas Day, including giving each staff member a short shift on that day.
