= Hopetoun Alpha =

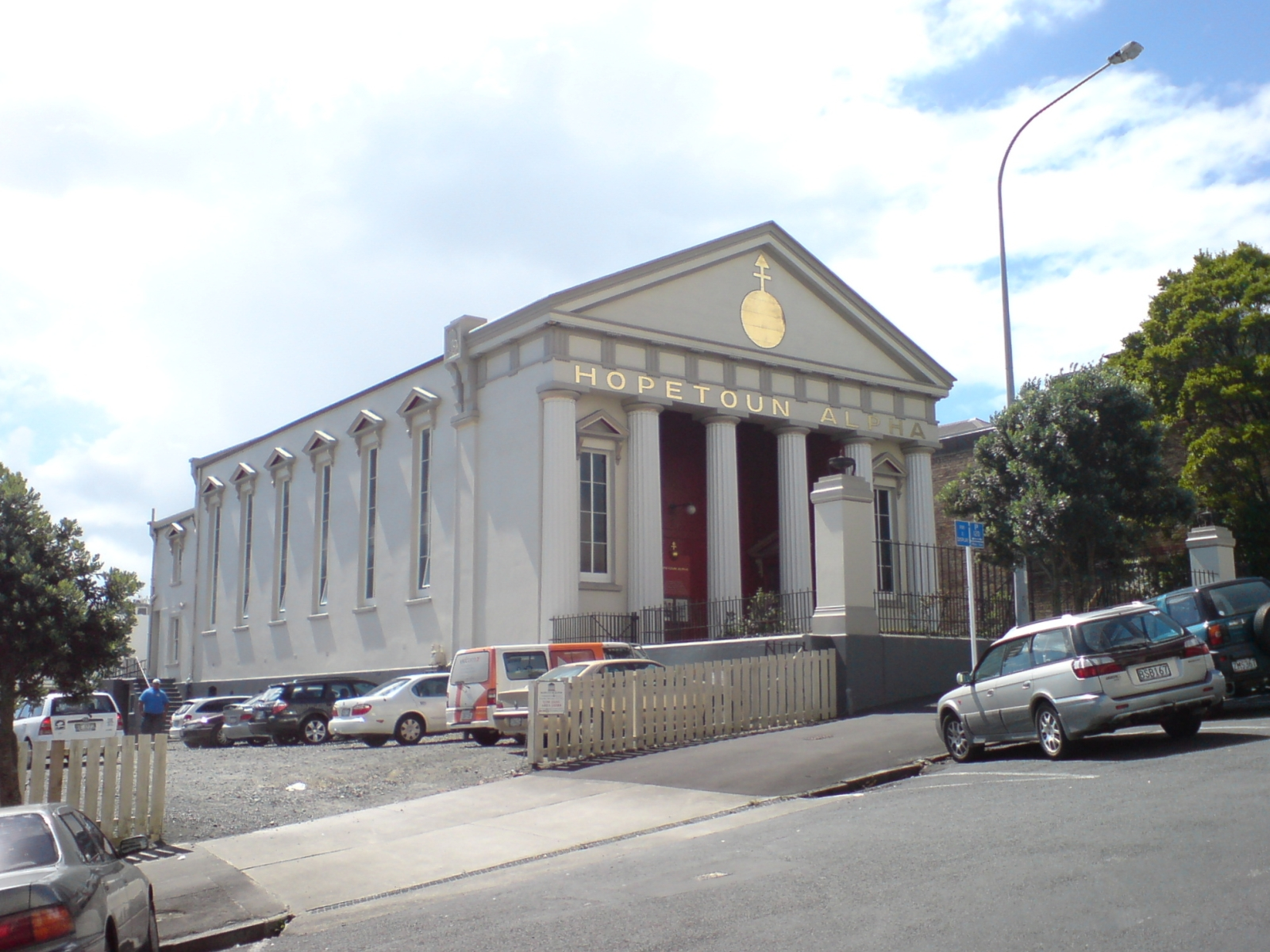
- Hopetoun Alpha
- Former names: Beresford Street Congregational Church, St James Church

General information
- Type: Church
- Architectural style: Neo-classical
- Location: 1 Beresford Street, Auckland
- Completed: 1876
- Inaugurated: 20 February 1876
- Cost: approx.₤4,000
- Affiliation: Congregational Union of New Zealand (pre-1964) Presbyterian Church of New Zealand (post 1964)

Design and construction
- Architect: Philip Herapath

Heritage New Zealand – Category 1
- Designated: 9 September 1989
- Reference no.: 642

Hopetoun Alpha, also known as Beresford Street Congregational Church and St James Church, is a historic neo-classical former church located on Beresford Street, Auckland, New Zealand. Originally constructed as a Congregational church, it was designed by Philip Herapath. It served the Congregational community until 1964 when the congregation merged with St James Presbyterian Church and adopted its name.

== History ==
Beresford Street Congregational Church and hall with St James Presbyterian Church visible in background at left

The first Congregational church in Auckland was founded in 1852 and operated out of Shamrock Cottage at the corner of Albert and Victoria Streets. By 1872 the congregation had outgrown the property and purchased a site on Beresford Street for ₤870. Construction of the new church cost approximately ₤4,000. Inauguration was held on the 20 February 1876 with Sir George Grey involved in the ceremony. Initial plans were for a masonry building but this proved too expensive, instead poured concrete was used due to the influence of parishioner Josiah Firth — a novel invention at the time, it had only been used in two homes in Auckland before. A hall was added onto the back in the 1880s. The building was controversial upon completion with one editor arguing for Italian or French style as more appropriate for the climate of Auckland. The Reverend J. T. Warlow Davies defended the design to his parishioners and stated the building was to be permanent.

A neighbouring structure was built in the 1880s to house ministers and from c.1907 was let to private tenants. This building was demolished by the 1990s.

In 1925 the church broadcast a live service to the rest of the country, the first time this had occurred in New Zealand. In 1928 a Sunday school hall was opened by Governor-General Sir Charles Fergusson.

In September 1964 Beresford Street Congregational Church and St James Church merged. This was the first Congregational Union of New Zealand church to merge with a Presbyterian Church of New Zealand church. The Presbyterian church on Wellington Street was demolished and the Beresford Street church adopted the name St James. After this the two churches established a community centre to help those in need. The community centre, which was located on the church's site has since been demolished.

The construction of the Auckland Motorway resulted in a drop in the population in Freemans Bay, this combined with a nationwide drop in church attendance following the Second World War led to the eventual decision to relocate in the 1990s and sell the property.

The roll of honour was moved to St Andrew's Church, Auckland following the closure of St James Church.

In 1994 it was purchased by Ashton Wylie who sought to preserve the building. It was renamed Hopetoun Alpha after purchase. Since Wylie's death in 1999 it has been managed by the Ashton Wylie Charitable Trust up until 2018 when the property was listed for sale. The building is as of 2023 the Hopetoun Alpha function centre.

== Description ==
The Beresford Street Congregational Church was constructed from poured concrete, the oldest example in Auckland, and was designed by Philip Herapath as a neo-classical church with Greek Doric styled design. Six fluted columns support the portico, where the entrance is. Six large windows line each side of the church hall. It had a capacity to seat 420 worshippers. The building sits above the Auckland Motorway, on a 3,114 m^{2} (3,724 sq yd) site. The interior walls are curved. The front facade is inspired by the Jupiter Panhellenius, with modifications for the climate and weather of Auckland. Herapath likely got the design from Joseph Gwilt's Encyclopædia of Architecture. The building differs more dramatically from Gwilt's design around the sides, with tall windows with a pediment instead of the architraves and fluted columns. Compared with similar neo-classical structures the Beresford Street Church is much more plain and simple.

The building has a category 1 registration with Heritage New Zealand and category A with Auckland Council. The Southern Cross newspaper described the church as "one of the most suitable and handsome of its kind in the city."
