= Shand's Emporium =

New Zealand historic building

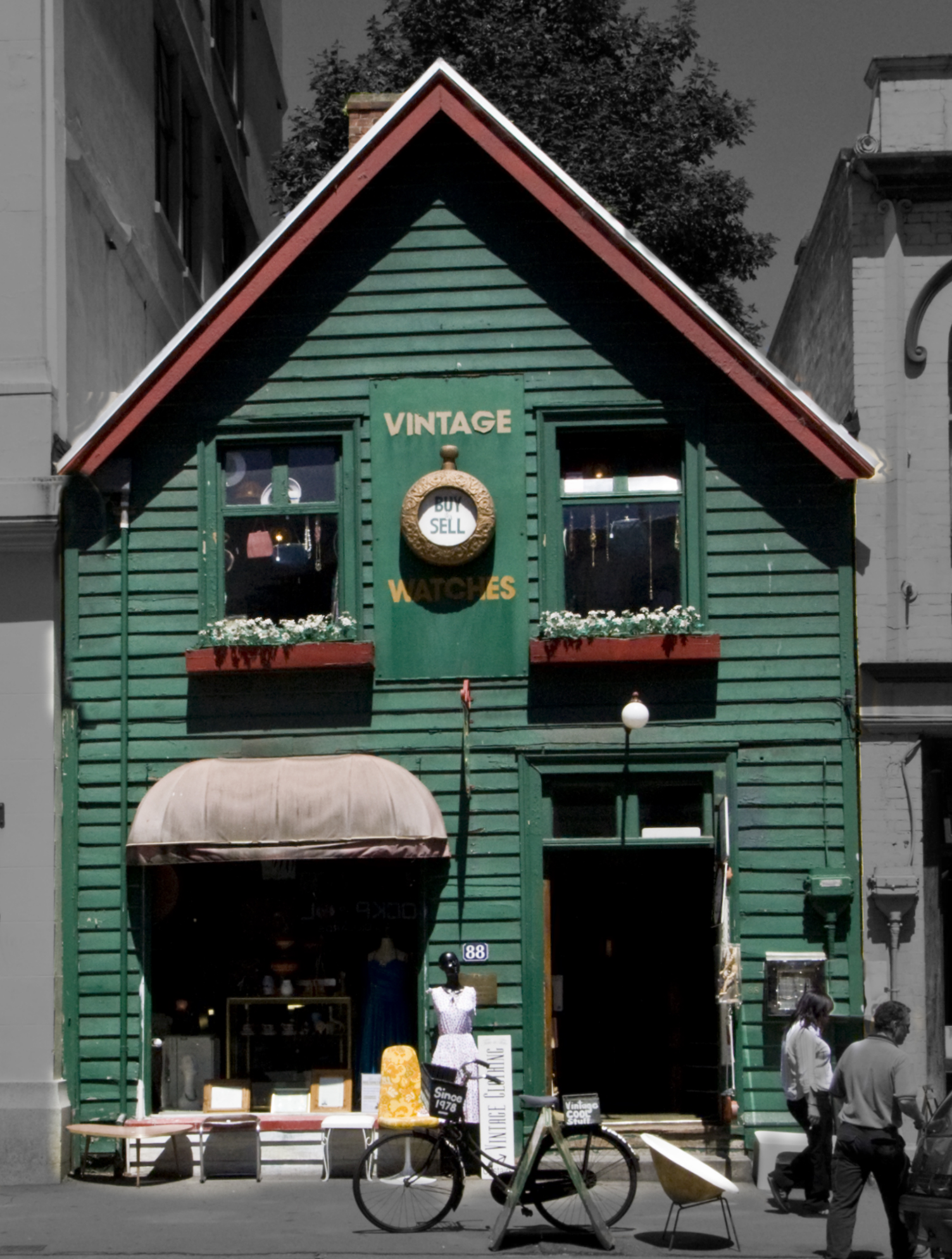
- Shand's Emporium in its original location in Hereford Street

General information
- Type: Commercial
- Location: Christchurch Central City, 217 Manchester Street, Christchurch, New Zealand
- Coordinates: 43.53132°S 172.63937°E
- Construction started: 1852

Technical details
- Floor count: two

Heritage New Zealand – Category 1
- Official name: Shand's
- Designated: 2 April 1985
- Reference no.: 307

Shand's Emporium, previously known as Gee's, is a historic building in the central city of Christchurch, New Zealand. One of the oldest commercial buildings to remain from the time Christchurch was founded, it was relocated in June 2015 from its original location in Hereford Street to Manchester Street, where it is placed adjacent to another heritage building, The Octagon.

== History ==
=== Hereford Street ===
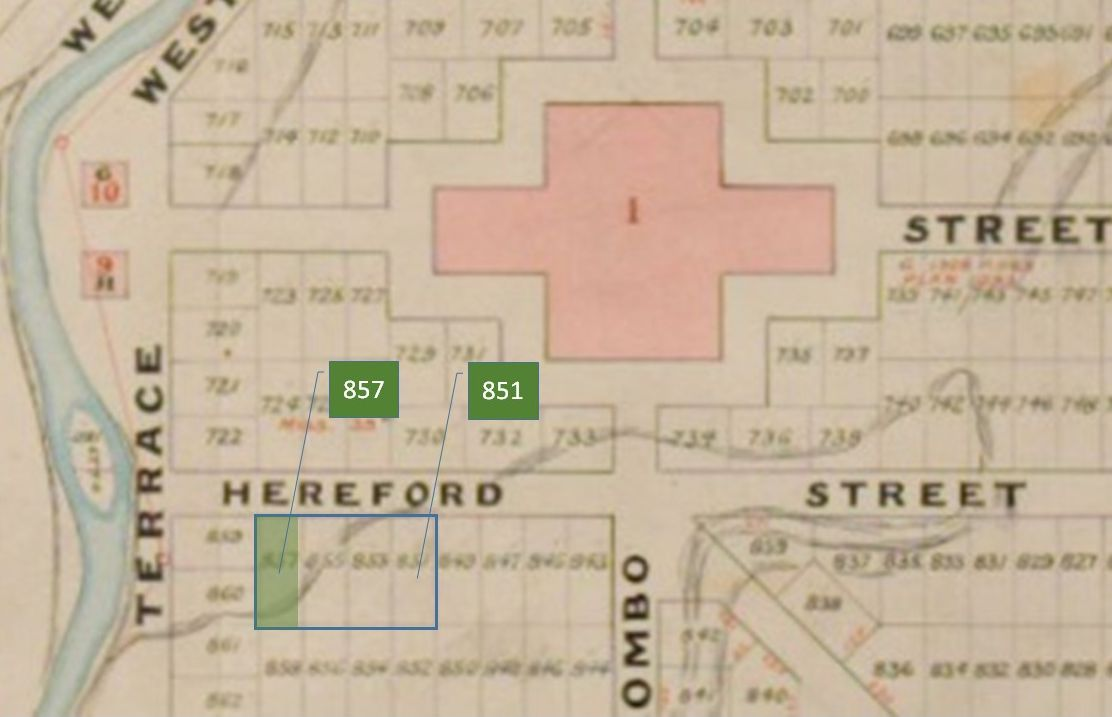
John Shand's town sections on Hereford Street, near Cathedral Square

John Shand was the original owner of the land in Hereford Street. A widower, he emigrated with his two sons to New Zealand on the Isabella Hercus and arrived in Lyttelton on 1 March 1851. His daughter would join them in 1857. Shand bought 100 acres (40 ha) of farmland in Riccarton (Shand Crescent is located on his former land) and this purchase from the Canterbury Association allowed him to choose four town sections as well. Shand chose the adjacent sections 851, 853, 855, and 857 in Hereford Street. Shand leased his town sections to William Sefton Moorhouse who at the time was the Superintendent of Canterbury Province. Moorhouse in turn leased part of town section 857 in August 1860 to the solicitor Harry Bell Johnstone, and the remainder of that section to Johnstone's business partner, Henry Wynn-Williams. Johnstone's lease agreement stipulated that he had to build a house, and a photo by Dr Alfred Barker from September 1860 shows what is now known as Shand's Emporium having been erected.

Initially, there were two offices downstairs, and three offices upstairs, each with their own window. Whilst some alterations were carried out over the years, the small footprint of the two-storey building did not give scope to substantial changes. In circa 1940, the building came into ownership of the Gough family. In 1977, the building was extensively renovated and converted for retail; at the same time, the name "Shand's Emporium" was given to it. In the late 1970s, the building was threatened with demolition when Telecom New Zealand planned to build a telephone exchange on the land; they already had a major phone exchange directly opposite on the north side of Hereford Street. The land was designated, which gave the government the option of compulsory purchase, but the designation was lifted in 1981. On 2 April 1985, the New Zealand Historic Places Trust (now known as Heritage New Zealand) placed a Category I heritage protection on the building, with registration number 307. The building had, over time, become almost unique, as few other commercial buildings from the initial European period of Christchurch were left, and the two-storey wooden building was dwarfed by its neighbours, many of them taller, and all of them made from permanent materials.

The 2010 and 2011 earthquakes caused much damage to Shand's Emporium. Its owner, Antony Gough, wanted to comprehensively redevelop his land holdings and tried to give Shand's Emporium away for relocation. Gough offered the building in 2013 free of charge, and even wanted to pay the cost of its relocation. There were plans to relocate the building to Redcliffs but this fell through. A new owner could not be found soon enough, and the building was relocated on Gough's land so that redevelopment could start. Christchurch Heritage Ltd, a heritage trust chaired by former Christchurch City Councillor Anna Crighton, bought the building for $1 in June 2015.

=== Manchester Street ===
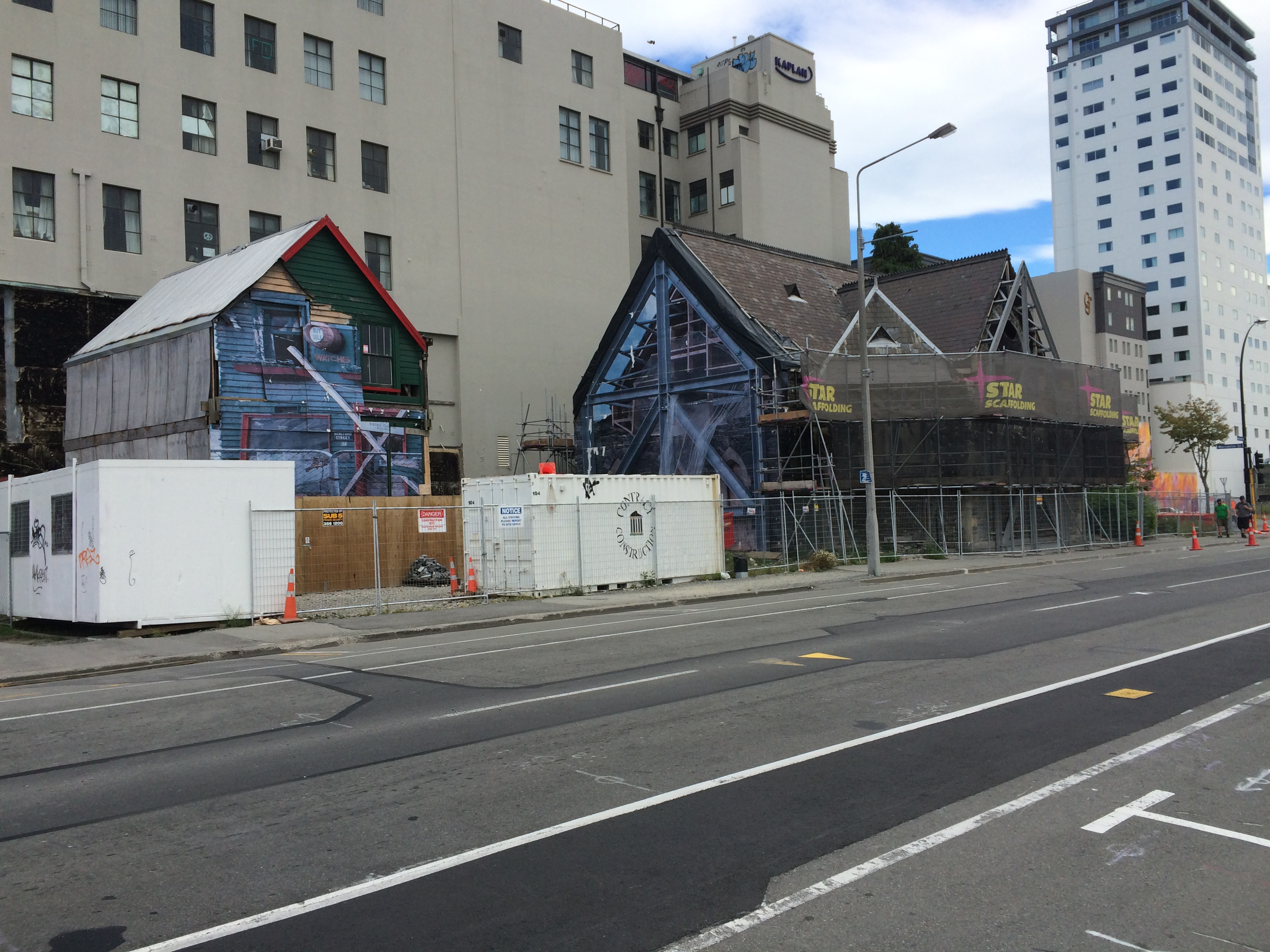
Shand's Emporium in Manchester Street next to The Octagon

On 27 June 2015, the building was relocated to nearby Manchester Street. At Colombo Street, the building was lifted over the wires of the Christchurch tram; this was seen as easier than removing the tram wires. The building was placed just south of the former Trinity Congregational Church, known for many years as the Octagon, and also registered as a Category I heritage structure. In mid-2019 the building became the home of the Whakamana Cannabis Museum. After the museum closed, the building was occupied by Paddy McNaughton's Irish Pub. The pub is operated by Nick Inkster, who also operates The Church pub next door.

== See also ==
- List of oldest buildings in Christchurch
