= Cookie Time =

New Zealand snack food company

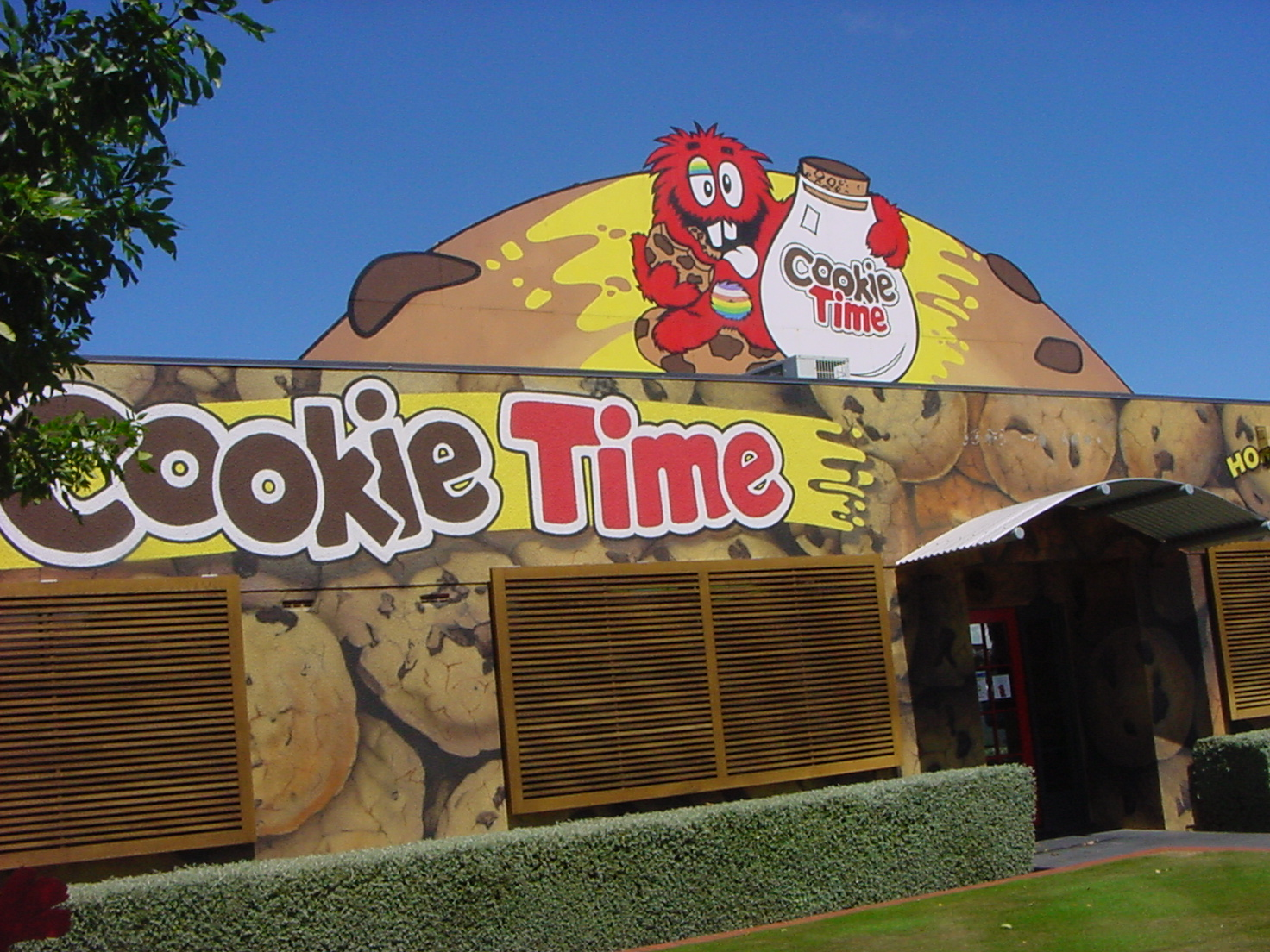
- Cookie Time building in Templeton, 2005
- Industry: Food
- Founded: 1983; 43 years ago
- Founder: Michael Mayell; Guy Pope-Mayell
- Headquarters: New Zealand
- Area served: New Zealand, Japan
- Products: Cookies, One Square Meal

Cookie Time Ltd is a New Zealand company based in Christchurch, New Zealand, which has been manufacturing snack foods since 1983.

It is fronted by a mascot known as the Cookie Muncher. The company's factory, with a shop for members of the public to buy cookies and other products, is at 789 Main South Road, in the settlement of Templeton, on the outskirts of Christchurch.

== History ==
Cookie Time was founded in Christchurch by 21-year-old Michael Mayell. Mayell was inspired by Mrs Field's Cookies in the United States. He baked cookies in a rented bakery and delivered 70 individual batches to 70 different dairies. Then starting on 7 February 1983, he and his mother delivered them to dairies across Christchurch, where they were sold individually from large glass jars. Mayell sold 5,000 cookies in the first week, and in the first year of operation sold $240,000 worth of cookies. Mayell's brother Guy Pope-Mayell joined the company shortly after its formation. In 1987 the company started packaging the cookies individually to prolong their shelf life and enable them to be sold in petrol stations.

On 2 April 1996 the company broke the Guinness World Record for the world's largest cookie by baking a 487 m^{2} (5241.5 sq. ft) cookie in a field behind their factory. The cookie had a diameter of 24.9 m (81 ft 8 in).

In May 2010 Cookie Time opened its first Cookie Bar in Queenstown. This is a retail store where customers can order various cookie-related food and drinks and buy souvenir merchandise. Following the success of the Queenstown operation, the company opened a Cookie Bar in Harajuku, Tokyo, in December 2013, in partnership with a Japanese food distribution business. Cookie dough for the shop in Japan was supplied from New Zealand. In November of 2022, Cookie Time opened a Cookie Bar in Dunedin, New Zealand.

Cookie Time began supplying Air New Zealand with snacks for passengers on domestic flights in 2012. In 2021 a passenger on an Air New Zealand flight jokingly complained to police that the airline had shifted from handing out Cookie Time chocolate chunk cookies to a shortbread variety. Air New Zealand advised that it periodically swaps to different cookie varieties.

In 2018 McDonald's Cookie Time McFlurry became available through Uber Eats.

== Products ==
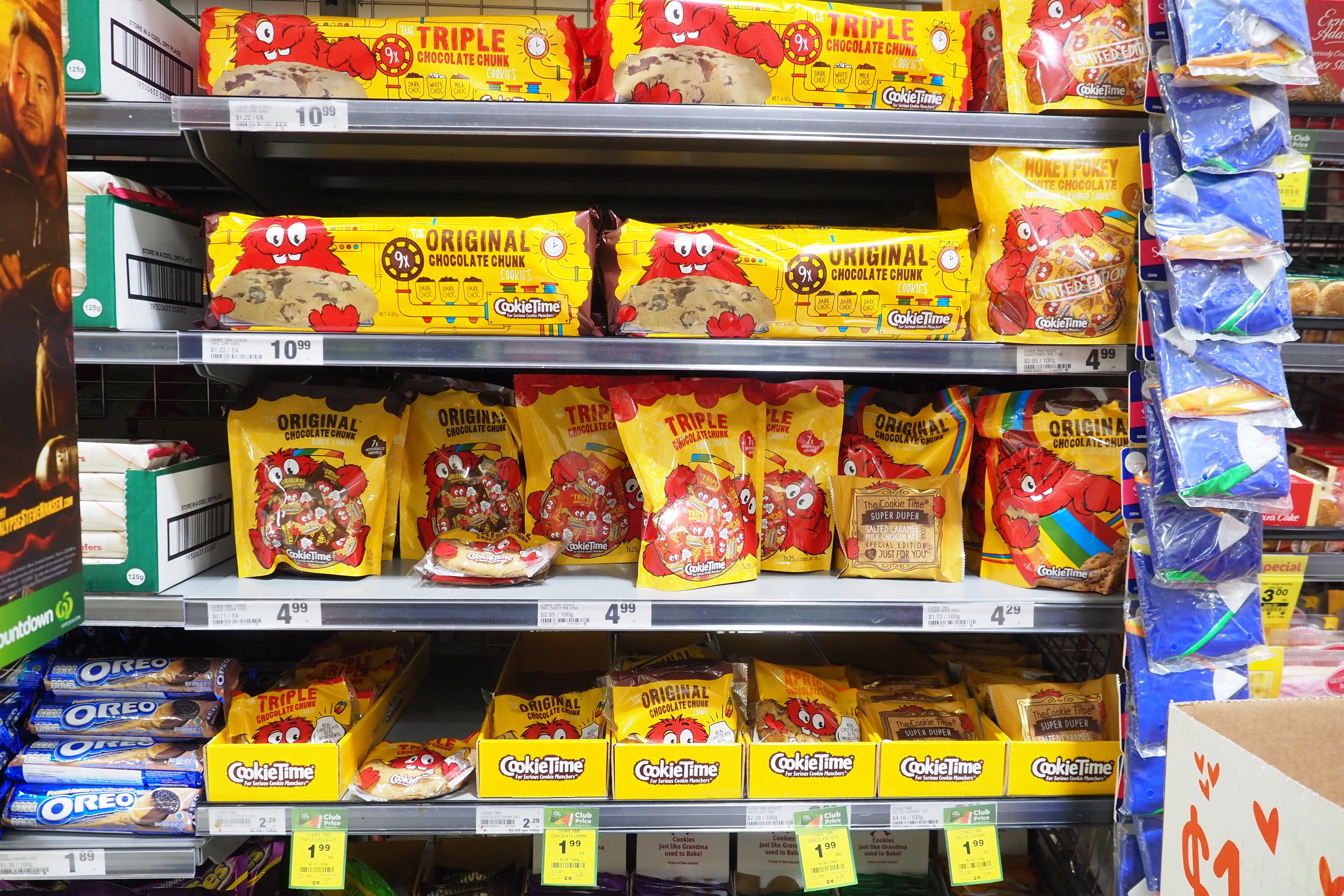
Cookie Time products for sale in a Countdown supermarket in 2017

The company's first and most recognisable product is the Original Chocolate Chunk Cookie, a large, individually wrapped cookie with oversized chocolate pieces. The recipe for this cookie has remained unchanged since 1983, a sign of its success in the New Zealand market. Other versions of individually wrapped cookies have been released, such as Triple Chocolate, Apricot Chocolate, and Chocolate Chunk Afghan. Other products include Christmas Cookies, Bumper Bars, Bumper Slice, One Square Meal and Smart Cookies. In 2020 there was a collaboration with Tip Top ice cream to create 'cookie caramel crush' flavoured ice cream. In July 2021, Cookie Time introduced a lolly cake biscuit in supermarkets and other retailers. Night 'n Day appeared to sell it before its official release date.

At seasonal times of the year the company takes on temporary staff on evening and night shifts to meet demand. In the weeks leading up to Christmas, university students sell buckets of small cookies door-to-door in city shops and offices and street stalls. Some of the profits from the Christmas cookies go to the Cookie Time Charitable Trust, which was set up in 2003 (as Cookie Munchers Charitable Trust) to support New Zealand children.

== Controversies ==
- 2000: Cookie Time alleged that Griffin's was breaching the Fair Trading Act by selling cookies in a plastic bucket very similar to Cookie Time's Christmas bucket. Cookie Time pointed out that the Griffins product only held 375g of biscuits whereas Cookie Time buckets of the same size held 650g of cookies. Griffin's was required to withdraw 10,000 buckets of cookies from sale.
- 2007: The company was fined $40,000 for breaching industrial safety regulations after a worker got trapped in a machine and broke her arm.
- 2011: Cookie Time filed a case against Qingdao Chengze Trade, who applied to use the Cookie Time logo in China. Qingdao Chengze's application to the State Intellectual Property Office (SIPO) used artwork that is identical to the Cookie Time logo.
- 2015: Cookie Time asked Auckland café Moustache Milk and Cookie Bar to change its name, stating that 'Cookie Bar' was a potential trademark infringement of Cookie Time's Cookie Bar shop in Queenstown. As of 2021 Moustache has not changed its name, though it advertises as just 'Moustache'.
