= PledgeMe =

Logo

PledgeMe is a Wellington, New Zealand–based crowdfunding platform which offers project and equity crowdfunding.

The company was founded as a rewards-based platform by Anna Guenther in 2011 and later became one of the first platforms to receive its equity crowdfunding license from the Financial Markets Authority in 2014. As of August 2015 over NZ$7.5 million has been raised on the platform from over 900 successful campaigns.
