= Electoral history of Christopher Luxon =

Elections featuring Prime Minister of New Zealand

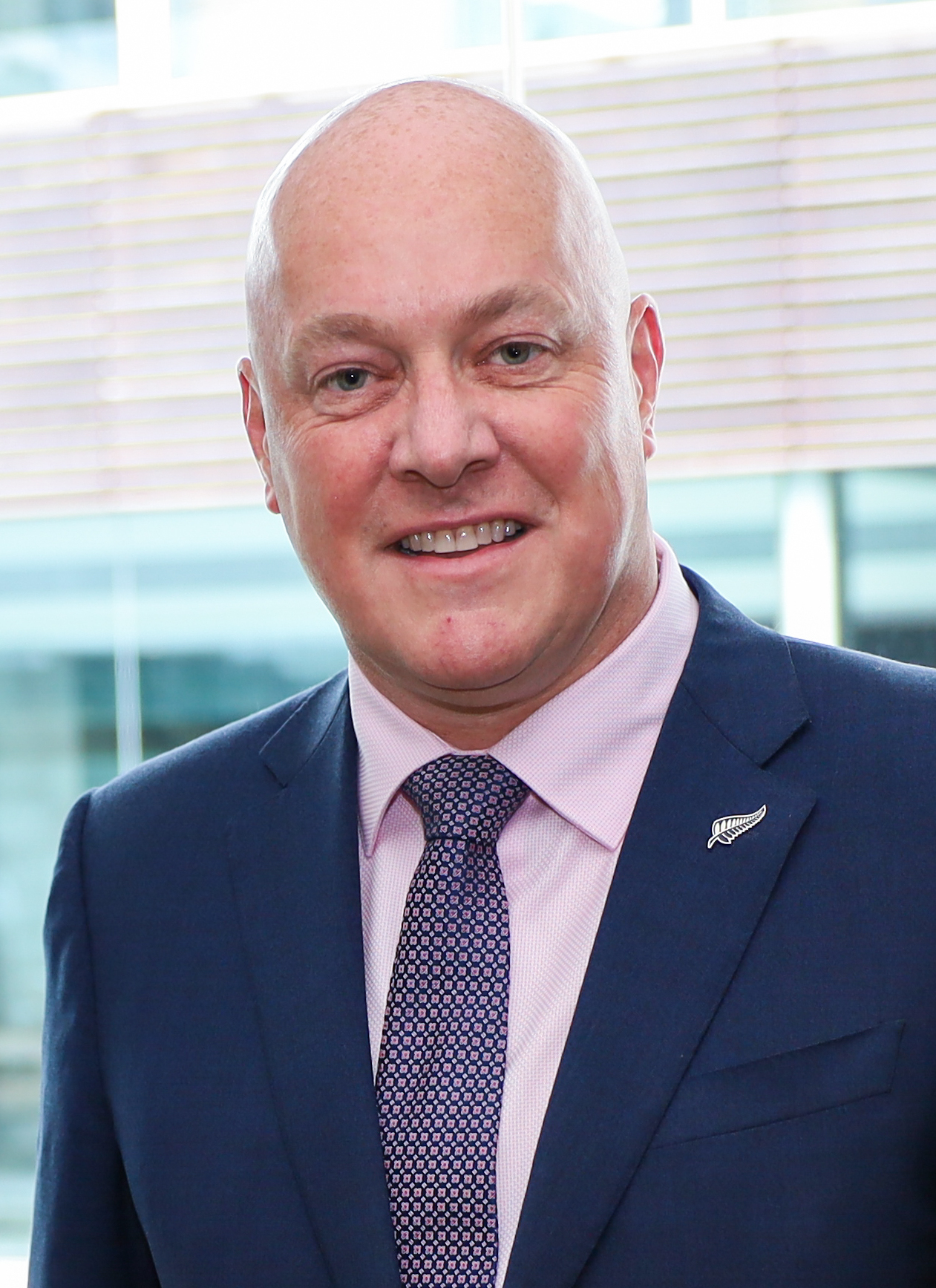
Luxon in 2022

This is a summary of the electoral history of Christopher Luxon, Prime Minister of New Zealand (2023–present), Leader of the National Party (2021–present), and Member of Parliament for Botany (2020–present).

== Parliamentary elections ==
=== 2020 election ===
2020 general election: Botany
Notes:	Blue background denotes the winner of the electorate vote. Pink background denotes a candidate elected from their party list. Yellow background denotes an electorate win by a list member, or other incumbent. A ✓ or ✗ denotes status of any incumbent, win or lose respectively.						
Party	Candidate	Votes	%	±%	Party votes	%	±%
National	Christopher Luxon	19,017	52.46	–9.17	13,970	37.05	−23.78
Labour	Naisi Chen	15,018	41.43	+16.81	17,900	47.48	+18.30
ACT	Damien Smith	1,236	3.41	+2.46	2,563	6.80	+6.20
New Conservative	Dieuwe De Boer	624	1.72	—	624	1.66	+1.40
Sustainable NZ	Peter Fleming	358	0.99	—	26	0.07	–
Green					1,236	3.28	+0.89
NZ First					541	1.43	−3.14
Opportunities					237	0.63	−0.19
Advance NZ					159	0.42	–
TEA					152	0.40	–
ONE					85	0.23	–
Legalise Cannabis					76	0.20	+0.05
Māori Party					70	0.19	−0.37
Vision NZ					40	0.11	–
Outdoors					15	0.04	±0.00
Heartland					5	0.01	–
Social Credit					4	0.01	±0.00
Informal votes		1,264			261		
Total valid votes		36,253			37,703		
Turnout		37,964	73.83	+1.20			
National hold	Majority	3,999	10.53	−26.48			

=== 2023 election ===
2023 general election: Botany
Notes:	Blue background denotes the winner of the electorate vote. Pink background denotes a candidate elected from their party list. Yellow background denotes an electorate win by a list member, or other incumbent. A ✓ or ✗ denotes status of any incumbent, win or lose respectively.						
Party	Candidate	Votes	%	±%	Party votes	%	±%
National	✓ Christopher Luxon	24,769	66.57	+14.11	22,239	58.74	+21.69
Labour	Kharag Singh	8,432	22.66	-18.77	7,708	22.27	-25.21
ACT	Bo Burns	1,959	5.26	+1.85	2,788	7.36	+0.56
NZ Loyal	John Armstrong	624	1.67	—	280	0.73	—
Animal Justice	Robert McNeil	428	1.15	—	98	0.25	–
New Conservative	Dieuwe de Boer	300	0.80	-0.92	86	0.22	-1.44
Green					2,212	5.84	+2.56
NZ First					1,136	3.00	+1.57
Opportunities					439	1.15	+0.33
Te Pāti Māori					188	0.49	+0.30
NewZeal					156	0.41	+0.18
Freedoms NZ					127	0.33	–
Legalise Cannabis					106	0.28	+0.08
New Nation					37	0.09	–
DemocracyNZ					29	0.07	–
Women's Rights					27	0.07	–
Leighton Baker Party					12	0.03	–
Informal votes		692			189		
Total valid votes		37,204			37,857		
National hold	Majority	16,337	43.91	+33.38			

== Leadership elections ==
Luxon was elected leader of the National Party unopposed on 30 November 2021 after Simon Bridges withdrew from the race and endorsed him.
