= Judith Collins (disambiguation) =

Judith Collins (born 1959) is a New Zealand politician who served as Leader of the Opposition.

Judith Collins may also refer to:

- Judith Collins (professor) (died 2014), an English university lecturer and researcher
- Judy Collins (born Judith Marjorie Collins, 1939), an American folk singer and songwriter
