= 2020 New Zealand National Party leadership election =

There were three elections for the leadership of the New Zealand National Party in 2020:

- the May 2020 New Zealand National Party leadership election, in which Simon Bridges was replaced by Todd Muller
- the July 2020 New Zealand National Party leadership election, in which Muller was replaced by Judith Collins
- the November 2020 New Zealand National Party deputy leadership election, in which Collins retained leadership but Gerry Brownlee was replaced as deputy by Shane Reti.
