= Judith Collins =

New Zealand politician (born 1959)

The Honourable Judith Collins KC
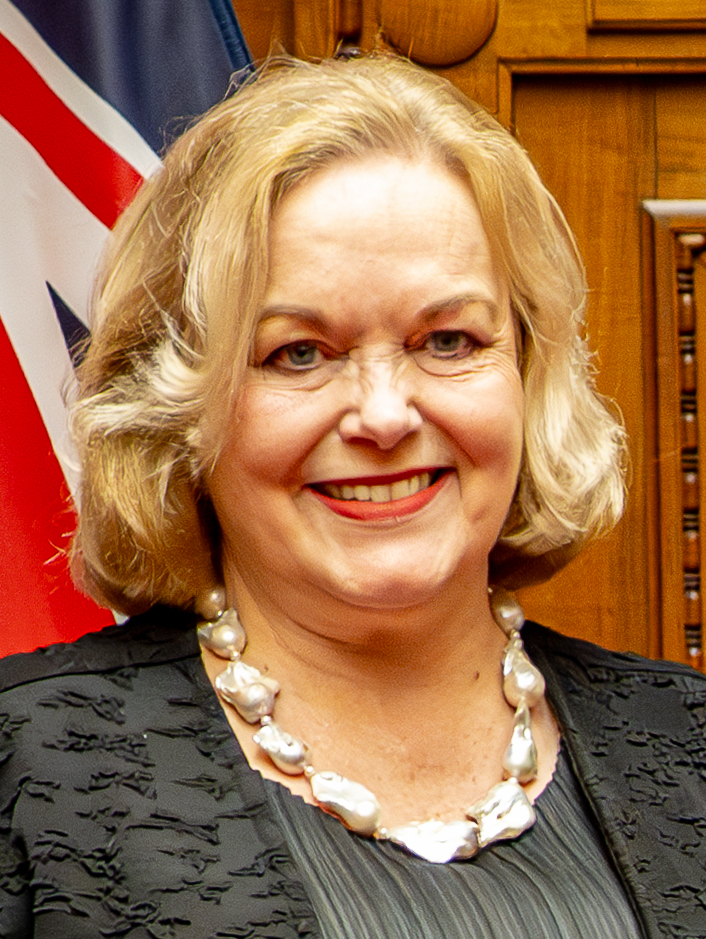
- Collins in 2025

34th Attorney-General of New Zealand
- In office 27 November 2023 – 2 April 2026
- Prime Minister: Christopher Luxon
- Preceded by: David Parker
- Succeeded by: Chris Bishop

43rd Minister of Defence
- In office 27 November 2023 – 7 April 2026
- Prime Minister: Christopher Luxon
- Preceded by: Andrew Little
- Succeeded by: Chris Penk

Minister Responsible for the Government Communications Security Bureau
- In office 27 November 2023 – 2 April 2026
- Prime Minister: Christopher Luxon
- Preceded by: Andrew Little
- Succeeded by: Chris Penk

Minister Responsible for the New Zealand Security Intelligence Service
- In office 27 November 2023 – 2 April 2026
- Prime Minister: Christopher Luxon
- Preceded by: Andrew Little
- Succeeded by: Chris Penk

5th Minister for Digitising Government
- In office 27 November 2023 – 2 April 2026
- Prime Minister: Christopher Luxon
- Preceded by: Ginny Andersen
- Succeeded by: Paul Goldsmith

1st Minister for Space
- In office 27 November 2023 – 2 April 2026
- Prime Minister: Christopher Luxon
- Preceded by: Office established

22nd Minister for the Public Service
- In office 24 January 2025 – 2 April 2026
- Prime Minister: Christopher Luxon
- Preceded by: Nicola Willis

28th Minister of Science, Innovation and Technology
- In office 27 November 2023 – 24 January 2025
- Prime Minister: Christopher Luxon
- Preceded by: Ayesha Verrall
- Succeeded by: Shane Reti
Offices held in Opposition 2020–2021
39th Leader of the Opposition
In office 14 July 2020 – 25 November 2021
| Prime Minister | Jacinda Ardern |
| Deputy | Gerry Brownlee; Shane Reti |
| Preceded by | Todd Muller |
| Succeeded by | Christopher Luxon |
14th Leader of the National Party
In office 14 July 2020 – 25 November 2021
| Deputy | Gerry Brownlee; Shane Reti |
| Preceded by | Todd Muller |
| Succeeded by | Christopher Luxon |
Ministerial Offices 2008–2017
29th Minister of Revenue
In office 20 December 2016 – 26 October 2017
| Prime Minister | Bill English |
| Preceded by | Michael Woodhouse |
| Succeeded by | Stuart Nash |
16th Minister of Energy and Resources
In office 20 December 2016 – 26 October 2017
| Prime Minister | Bill English |
| Preceded by | Simon Bridges |
| Succeeded by | Megan Woods |
Minister for Ethnic Affairs
In office 20 December 2016 – 26 October 2017
| Prime Minister | Bill English |
| Preceded by | Sam Lotu-Iiga |
| Succeeded by | Jenny Salesa |
In office 14 December 2011 – 30 August 2014
| Prime Minister | John Key |
| Preceded by | Hekia Parata |
| Succeeded by | Sam Lotu-Iiga |
35th Minister of Police
In office 14 December 2015 – 20 December 2016
| Prime Minister | John Key; Bill English |
| Preceded by | Michael Woodhouse |
| Succeeded by | Paula Bennett |
In office 19 November 2008 – 12 December 2011
| Prime Minister | John Key |
| Preceded by | Annette King |
| Succeeded by | Anne Tolley |
10th Minister of Corrections
In office 14 December 2015 – 20 December 2016
| Prime Minister | John Key; Bill English |
| Preceded by | Sam Lotu-Iiga |
| Succeeded by | Louise Upston |
In office 19 November 2008 – 12 December 2011
| Prime Minister | John Key |
| Preceded by | Phil Goff |
| Succeeded by | Anne Tolley |
47th Minister of Justice
In office 12 December 2011 – 30 August 2014
| Prime Minister | John Key |
| Preceded by | Simon Power |
| Succeeded by | Amy Adams |

Member of the New Zealand Parliament for Papakura
- In office 8 November 2008 – 14 May 2026
- Preceded by: John Robertson (1996)
- Majority: 13,519

Member of the New Zealand Parliament for Clevedon
- In office 27 July 2002 – 8 November 2008
- Preceded by: Warren Kyd (1996)
- Succeeded by: Constituency abolished
- Majority: 12,871 (34.9%)

Personal details
- Born: Judith Anne Collins; 24 February 1959 (age 67) Hamilton, New Zealand
- Party: National Party
- Spouse: David Wong-Tung
- Children: 1
- Education: University of Canterbury (LLB); University of Auckland; (LLM) (MTaxS)

Judith Anne Collins KC (born 24 February 1959) is a New Zealand politician who served as the attorney-general and minister of defence from 27 November 2023 to 7 April 2026. She served as the leader of the Opposition and leader of the New Zealand National Party from 14 July 2020 to 25 November 2021. Collins served as the member of Parliament (MP) for Papakura from 2008 to 2026 and was MP for Clevedon from 2002 to 2008.

Born in Hamilton, Collins studied at Matamata College, the University of Canterbury and University of Auckland. Before entering politics, she worked as a commercial lawyer and was President of the Auckland District Law Society and Vice-President of the New Zealand Law Society. She was a solicitor for four different firms from 1981 and 1990, before running her own practice for a decade. She was a director of Housing New Zealand from 1999 to 2001 and worked as special counsel for Minter Ellison Rudd Watts from 2000 to 2002 before she entered Parliament at the 2002 election.

Collins was appointed to the Cabinet by Prime Minister John Key when the National Party entered government at the 2008 election. She was ranked fifth in the Cabinet and the highest-ranked woman. Collins served as minister of police and minister of corrections from 2008 to 2011 and 2015 to 2016. After the 2011 election, she was appointed minister of justice and minister for the ACC. In August 2014 Collins was compelled to resign following email leaks alleging she had undermined the head of the Serious Fraud Office whilst she was police minister. While she was not cleared of wrongdoing related to that incident, she returned to the Cabinet in 2015. Collins served under Prime Minister Bill English as minister of revenue and minister of energy and resources from 2016 to 2017.

After the National Party left government in the 2017 election, Collins served in several shadow portfolios. She was elected to succeed Todd Muller as National Party leader by the parliamentary caucus on 14 July 2020, becoming leader of the Opposition. She was the second female leader of the National Party, after Jenny Shipley. She led the party to its second-worst defeat in the party's history at the 2020 election, losing 23 seats. Collins was removed as leader of the National Party by its caucus on 25 November 2021, the day after she suddenly demoted Simon Bridges, a political rival, for allegations of making a since-resolved inappropriate comment in 2017.

Following National's victory in the 2023 election, Prime Minister Christopher Luxon appointed Collins to Cabinet; she held seven ministerial posts. Collins was then the longest continuously serving female MP, and considered the Mother of the House. In January 2026 Collins announced she had been appointed as president of the New Zealand Law Commission, and she retired from politics on 14 May 2026.

== Early life and career ==
Collins was born in Hamilton. Her parents were dairy farmers Percy and Jessie Collins of Walton in the Waikato and she was the youngest of six children. She was educated at Walton School, Matamata Intermediate and Matamata College. In 1977 and 1978, she studied at the University of Canterbury. In 1979, she switched to the University of Auckland, and obtained first a Bachelor of Laws degree and then Master of Laws (Hons) and later Master of Taxation Studies (MTaxS) degrees. In 2020, she graduated with a Graduate Diploma in Occupational Health and Safety from Massey University. She met her husband, Chinese-Samoan David Wong-Tung, at university. He was then a police officer and had migrated from Samoa as a child. They have one son. Collins has described herself as a liberal Anglican.

Collins was a Labour Party supporter from childhood, but by 2002 had been a member of the National Party for three years. She has been a member of Zonta International and of Rotary International.

== Professional career ==
After leaving university, she worked as a lawyer, specialising in employment, property, commercial, and tax law. She worked as a solicitor for four different firms between 1981 and 1990 and then became principal of her own firm, Judith Collins & Associates (1990–2000). In the last two years before the election to Parliament, she worked as special counsel for Minter Ellison Rudd Watts (2000–2002).

She was active in legal associations, and was President of the Auckland District Law Society (1998–1999) and Vice-President of the New Zealand Law Society (1999–2000). She served as chairperson of the Casino Control Authority (1999–2002) and was a director of Housing New Zealand Limited (1999–2001).

== Early parliamentary career (2002–2008) ==
New Zealand Parliament
| Years | Term | Electorate | List | Party |
|---|---|---|---|---|
| 2002–2005 | 47th | Clevedon | 48 | National |
| 2005–2008 | 48th | Clevedon | 12 | National |
| 2008–2011 | 49th | Papakura | 7 | National |
| 2011–2014 | 50th | Papakura | 7 | National |
| 2014–2017 | 51st | Papakura | 6 | National |
| 2017–2020 | 52nd | Papakura | 16 | National |
| 2020–2023 | 53rd | Papakura | 1 | National |
| 2023–2026 | 54th | Papakura | 10 | National |

Collins was elected to Parliament in the 2002 election as the National MP for Clevedon. Although technically a new electorate, Clevedon was largely based on the old Hunua electorate, held by National's Warren Kyd.

In Parliament, Collins became National's Associate Spokesperson on Health and Spokesperson on Internal Affairs. In 2003, these responsibilities were changed for those of Associate Spokesperson on Justice and Spokesperson on Tourism. She was generally regarded as having performed well and when Katherine Rich refused to give full support to the controversial Orewa Speech by then-party leader Don Brash, Rich was demoted in February 2005 and Collins became National's spokesperson on Social Welfare instead. Collins then served as spokesperson on Family and spokesperson on Pacific Island Affairs.

In 2003, while in opposition, Collins campaigned for an inquiry to find out whether New Zealand troops were exposed to Agent Orange during the Vietnam War and if so any effect this subsequently had. Despite previous inquiries stating otherwise, the committee established that troops were exposed to defoliant chemicals during their service in Vietnam, and therefore operated in a toxic environment. This resulted in an apology in 2004 from the Labour-led Government to Veterans and the establishment of a Memorandum of Understanding (MoU) to support veterans. In 2004 Collins was awarded the Ex-Vietnam Services Association Pin for campaigning for the inquiry.

Collins's Clevedon electorate disappeared under boundary changes for the 2008 election. She originally announced her intention to seek the National Party nomination for Howick, which comprises the urban part of her former Clevedon electorate. However, following objections made to the Electoral Commission over draft changes to the boundaries that saw a major redrawing of the adjacent constituency Pakuranga, the draft Howick was redrawn and renamed Botany. Collins then sought and won the nomination for Papakura (which comprises the other half of her former Clevedon electorate) and allowed her colleague National Party MP Pansy Wong to seek nomination for Botany. Collins won Papakura with a majority of more than 10,000 votes.

== Fifth National Government (2008–2017) ==
The National Party formed a government after the 2008 election, and Collins entered Cabinet with the portfolios of Police, Corrections and Veterans' Affairs. Early in 2009, she was created Minister Responsible for the Serious Fraud Office.

After the 2011 election she was appointed Minister of Justice, Minister of Accident Compensation Corporation (ACC) and Minister of Ethnic Affairs and, with a Cabinet ranking of five, was the highest ranked woman.

=== Minister of Corrections ===
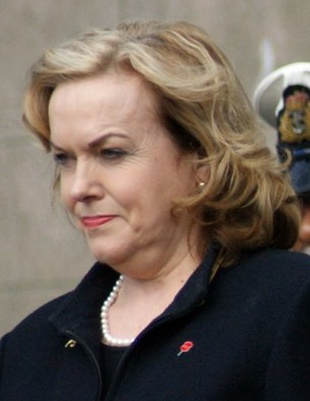
Collins at the National War Memorial, 2010

In 2009, Collins questioned the leadership of, and later refused to express confidence in, Department of Corrections chief executive Barry Matthews, after a spate of bad publicity. However, after an enquiry by the State Services Commissioner Iain Rennie, Matthews kept his job because Corrections had made efforts to improve and had warned the government of the day and the previous government that under-resourcing was putting public safety at risk.

Collins increased the availability of work programmes in prison, and increased funding to widen the availability of alcohol and drug treatment programmes. Corrections built three new Drug Treatment Units and introducing condensed treatment programmes for prisoners serving shorter sentences. Collins oversaw completion of a new prison in Mount Eden, Auckland, and instigated the private management contract for the new prison to British company Serco, on the recommendation of the Department of Corrections. This was the first prison since 2005 to be managed by a private sector contractor.

In June 2010, Collins announced that from 1 July 2011 tobacco smoking and possessing lighters in prison would be banned, to reduce the health risk that smoking and fire presented to prison guards and prisoners. This ban was subsequently successfully challenged in court on two occasions, resulting in a law change to maintain it.

=== Minister of Police ===
Following a police trial of tasers in 2006–07, Collins supported their introduction by then Police Commissioner Howard Broad. In the 2009 budget she announced NZ$10 million worth of funding to complete a nationwide taser roll-out to all police districts, and since then has advocated that the police be given further discretion about when they can equip themselves with tasers. She has also supported increased access to firearms for frontline officers, by equipping all front-line police vehicles with lock boxes for firearms, but does not support the full-time general arming of police officers.

During her early years in parliament, Collins developed a reputation for tough talking and in 2009 was nicknamed "Crusher Collins" when she proposed legislation to 'crush' the cars of persistent boy racers. Collins described herself as the minister "who brought back deterrence".

=== Minister of Justice ===
In 2012, Collins moderated the cuts-back to legal aid begun by her predecessor, Simon Power. She reduced the charges for family and civil cases, delayed the period before interest is charged on outstanding legal aid debt and dropped a proposal to make it harder to get legal aid for less serious crimes such as theft, assault or careless driving. She did however retain fixed fees for criminal work and the rotation of the legal aid to lawyers in all but the most serious cases, which attracted criticism from some lawyers.

After a two-year investigation the Law Commission produced a report for government with 153 recommendations to reform New Zealand's alcohol laws. While some legislative changes were passed in December 2012, the Opposition and health sector lobbyists said the evidence-based advice from the Commission was disregarded by Collins and her predecessor Simon Power with the result that the final legislation "was a pale imitation of the landmark Law Commission report it was based on." Examples include Collins originally announcing a ban in May 2012 of ready-to-drink (RTD) beverages with 6 per cent alcohol or more from off-licenses. However, in the face of criticism from the liquor industry, she back-tracked on this ban, and three months later announced that the industry would develop its own voluntary code "to limit the harm to young people caused by RTDs". The Commission also recommended a 50 per cent tax increase on alcohol (which was dismissed immediately by the Government) and an increase in the purchase age, which was also dismissed after a conscience vote in September 2012. Collins herself voted to raise the purchase age. Overall Collins said "the reforms struck a sensible balance by reducing the serious harm caused by alcohol without penalising people who drank responsibly." The Labour Party and Professor Doug Sellman said that the changes were weak and would do little to reduce the harm caused by binge drinking. Sellman said: "It's called the Alcohol Reform Bill but it has no reforms in it".

In December 2012, Collins revealed she had concerns about the robustness of a report authored by retired Canadian Supreme Court judge Ian Binnie, which recommended that David Bain should be paid compensation for the 13 years he spent in prison before being acquitted at retrial in 2009. The report had been presented to Collins on 31 August 2012, but the dispute only became public after Binnie threatened to release the report on his own. Collins had provided a copy of the report to the police and the Solicitor-General and ordered a peer review by former New Zealand High Court judge Robert Fisher, sending a "34-point list of issues attacking the case" along with her letter of instruction. She did not provide a copy of Binnie's report to Bain's legal team. This fact, combined with the circumstances around the peer review by Fisher, led to accusations from Bain's team and from Justice Binnie that Collins was not following an "even handed process". Collins subsequently released the reports publicly. A month later, Bain filed a claim in the High Court seeking a review of Collins's actions. The claim alleged Collins breached natural justice and the Bill of Rights Act in her treatment of him and that she "acted in bad faith, abused her power, and acted in a biased, unreasonable and predetermined manner".

=== Minister for ACC ===
In August 2011, a significant privacy breach occurred at the Accident Compensation Corporation (ACC) following the accidental release of 6700 claimants' details to ACC claimant, Bronwyn Pullar. Following the breach, Collins wanted a change in the culture at ACC to make "privacy and information security" the most important focus. As part of these changes the board chair, John Judge, did not have his tenure on the board renewed, and the chief executive Ralph Stewart resigned the next day. In May 2012, Collins sued Labour MPs Trevor Mallard and Andrew Little for defamation over comments they made on Radio New Zealand linking her to the leak of an e-mail from Michelle Boag about Pullar's case. The case was settled after a High Court hearing in November 2012.

=== Controversies ===
In March 2014, Collins was accused of a conflict of interest after an overseas trip where she 'dropped in' and endorsed the milk produced by Oravida – a New Zealand company which exports to China – of which her husband is a director. After being admonished by the Prime Minister, Collins apologised and stated that she and a Chinese executive were 'very close personal friends'. Over the following weeks the Labour Party continued asking who the Chinese official was. Collins did not provide his name, which House speaker David Carter described as "very unsatisfactory". Prime Minister John Key stated publicly that Judith Collins was on her final warning over this incident.

In August 2014 the book Dirty Politics, written by Nicky Hager, revealed that Collins was friends with right-wing blogger Cameron Slater and had passed on private information to him about Simon Pleasants, a public servant at Internal Affairs. Collins believed Pleasants had leaked information about Deputy Prime Minister Bill English misusing his housing allowance. Slater published Mr Pleasant's name and details on his blog. A 3News-Reid Research poll taken at the time revealed that 63% of voters believed Prime Minister John Key should have stood Collins down over this incident. Key said Collins had been 'unwise' and placed on her second final warning.

New Zealand First leader Winston Peters claimed he was approached to do a post–2014 election deal with National with Collins as the leader. Peters went on to say he would swear an affidavit that he had been approached. Collins denied this claim. On 29 August 2014 Key backed Collins up by stating "I accept Judith 100 per cent at her word."

On 30 August 2014 Collins resigned her Cabinet positions following the leak of another e-mail written by Slater in 2011, which suggested she had also attempted to undermine another public servant, Adam Feeley. Feeley was Director of the Serious Fraud Office (SFO) and Collins was the Minister responsible for the SFO at the time. Collins says she resigned because she believed the attacks on her had become a distraction for the National Party leading up to the election. She called for an inquiry so she could clear her name.

After the 2014 election, John Key left Collins off the "Roll of the Honourables" due to the ongoing inquiry into her role with Adam Feeley. This made her ineligible to use the title 'The Honourable'. Collins expressed surprise about having found out about the decision through the media, and Key admitted that his decision should have been explained to Collins. On 25 November 2014 the Chisholm report was released, clearing Collins of the allegations into her dealings with former SFO director Adam Feeley, so on 4 December 2014 Collins was granted the right to retain the title of 'The Honourable' for life.

Collins was cleared of involvement in the Adam Feeley smear. On 7 December 2015, Key announced Collins would return to Cabinet, to hold her former portfolios of Corrections and Police again. She was sworn in again on 14 December 2015.

=== 2016 leadership campaign and aftermath ===
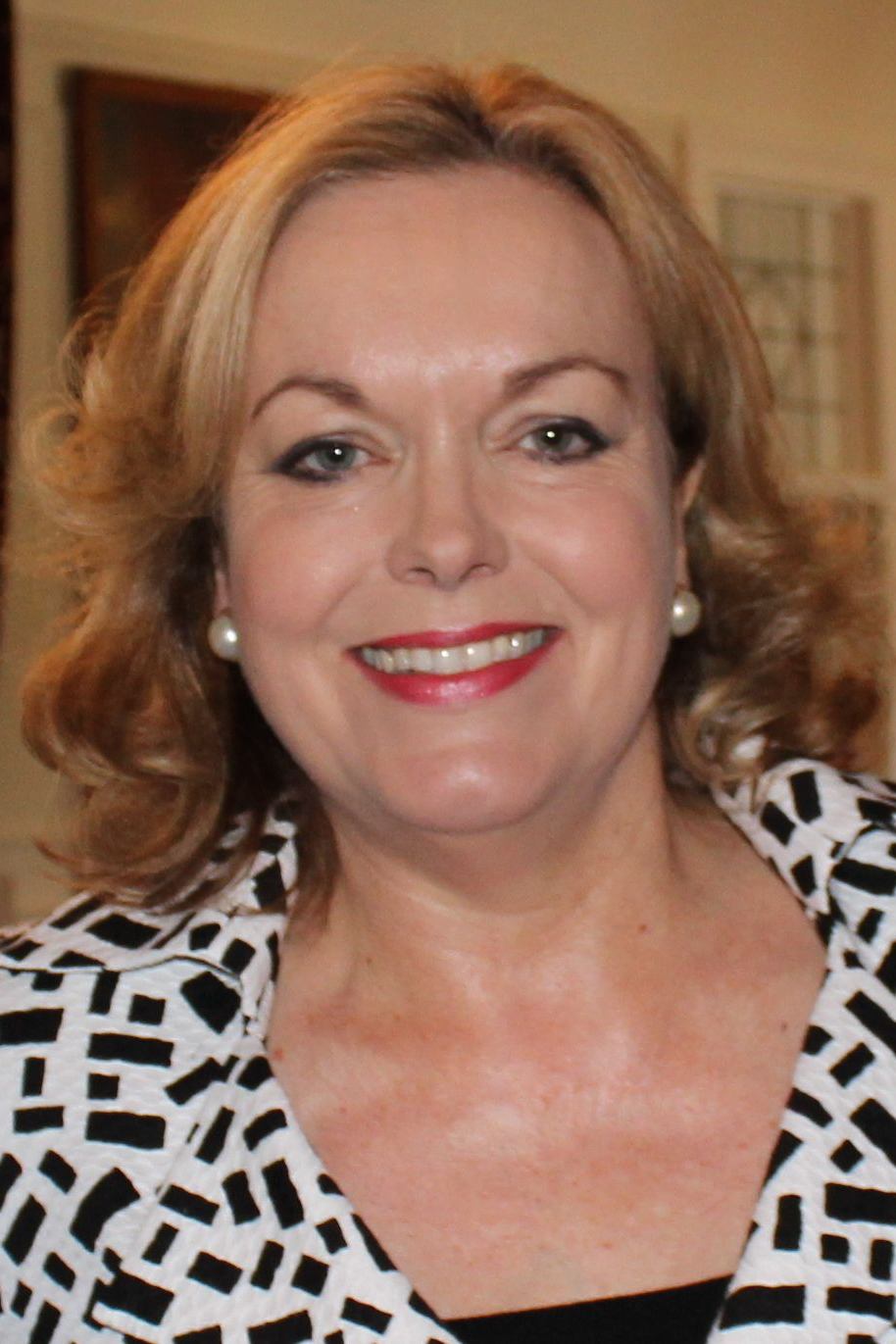
Collins in 2016

John Key announced his resignation as leader of the National Party on 5 December 2016. The following day, Collins announced her intention to stand as his replacement, which would have elevated her to the prime ministership. The other candidates were Bill English and Jonathan Coleman. On 8 December, both Collins and Coleman withdrew as candidates, allowing English to be elected unopposed.

On 20 December 2016, she was officially sworn in as a minister with new portfolios in the new Bill English cabinet. She dropped in cabinet rank but was made Minister of Revenue, Minister of Energy and Resources, and Minister for Ethnic Communities. The corrections and police portfolios were given to Louise Upston and Paula Bennett, respectively.

== Opposition (2017–2023) ==
=== 2018 leadership campaign ===
Bill English announced his resignation as leader of the National Party on 13 February 2018. The following day, Collins became the first person to announce their intention to stand as his replacement; she was later joined by Amy Adams and Simon Bridges. She cited the need for "strong and decisive leadership". Collins was endorsed by former National leader Don Brash, and political commentators Duncan Garner, Mike Hosking, Cameron Slater, and Chris Trotter. Hosking later retracted his endorsement when Steven Joyce announced his candidacy. Bridges went on to win the leadership role.

In late May 2018, Collins, in her capacity as Opposition Transport spokesperson, raised the matter that Transport Minister Phil Twyford had made an unauthorised phone call while his flight had taken off; a violation of national civil aviation laws. In response, Twyford offered to resign as Transport Minister. Prime Minister Jacinda Ardern stripped Twyford of his civil aviation portfolio but retained him as Transport Minister.

=== 2020 leadership campaign ===
On 14 July 2020, three months before the 2020 general election, Collins became leader of the National Party in a leadership election held after the abrupt resignation of Todd Muller earlier that day. Gerry Brownlee was elected deputy leader. Collins was the second woman to be leader of the National Party.

Collins faced criticism during her campaign for being out of touch with ordinary New Zealanders after she grossly underestimated the price of a block of cheese when asked in an interview how much it cost.

=== Leader of the Opposition (2020–2021) ===
Collins led the party to the 2020 election as significant underdogs, with opinion polls suggesting historically large swings to the Labour Party, reflecting its well-received response to the COVID-19 pandemic. Collins, although more popular than her predecessors, Todd Muller and Simon Bridges, still significantly lagged behind Jacinda Ardern as preferred prime minister by 30 to 40 points.

Ultimately, the 2020 election saw a massive Labour landslide, with the party winning 65 seats, enough to form a majority government in its own right. The Collins-led National Party had a crushing defeat, suffering a 18.9% swing against them, and a 23 seat drop, finishing with 33 seats. It was the second-worst defeat the National Party had ever suffered, edged out by the 2002 disaster, where the party won an even grimmer number of 27 seats. The election even saw the party's Deputy Leader Gerry Brownlee lose his own seat of Ilam, which was considered National heartland. With the result beyond doubt, a near-tearful Collins announced on election night that she had telephoned Ardern and conceded defeat, but vowed that the party would bounce back stronger in the next election. Despite the poor result, Collins retained her electorate seat in Papakura by a final margin of 5,583 votes.

In early February 2021, Collins confirmed that the National Party would be standing candidates in the Māori electorates, reversing the party's policy of not contesting those seats. As Leader of the Opposition, Collins has opposed alleged policies of "racist separatism" towards the Māori community, including race-based affirmative action policies and the creation of separate Māori governance authorities, including the Māori Health Authority, and the introduction of Māori wards and constituencies in local government. Collins's stance on these issues drew accusations of racism from the Māori Party, which Collins rejected.

In mid-June 2021, Collins supported the Labour Government's apology for the Dawn Raids of the 1970s and early 1980s, which disproportionately targeted the Pasifika communities. She stated that "this historic act of discrimination against our Pasifika communities caused anguish that reverberated across decades, and it is right that we acknowledge this".

In early September 2021, Collins drew controversy when she described immunologist and science communicator Siouxsie Wiles as a "big, fat hypocrite" during a virtual conversation with a Pasifika group aligned with the party. Collins's remarks came after right-wing blogger Cameron Slater posted a video of Wiles socialising with a friend at an Auckland beach during an Alert Level 4 lockdown in the Auckland Region, in response to the August 2021 Delta variant community outbreak. Slater had alleged that Wiles and her friend flouted lockdown restrictions in his blog BFD. In response, Wiles clarified that her friend was part of the same bubble as her, and that the pair had cycled 5 km from her house to the beach. In response to Collins's criticism of Wiles, Director-General of Health Ashley Bloomfield defended Wiles from allegations that she breached lockdown restrictions.

Collins was removed as leader of the National Party in a caucus vote of no confidence on 25 November 2021. That was the day after she sacked rival Simon Bridges over a crude comment he made to fellow MP Jacqui Dean five years prior, though the incident had been quickly resolved, with no hard feelings remaining between them. National MPs and the media therefore saw Collins's action as being to neutralise Bridges as an opponent by smearing him. Shane Reti was acting leader until the subsequent leadership election on 30 November, when Christopher Luxon was elected party leader.

=== Shadow Cabinet of Christopher Luxon (2021–2023) ===
On 19 January 2023, Collins was promoted from 19th to 10th place on Luxon's shadow cabinet. She also assumed the new roles of "Foreign Direct Investment" and "Digitising Government" spokesperson.

== Sixth National Government (2023–2026) ==
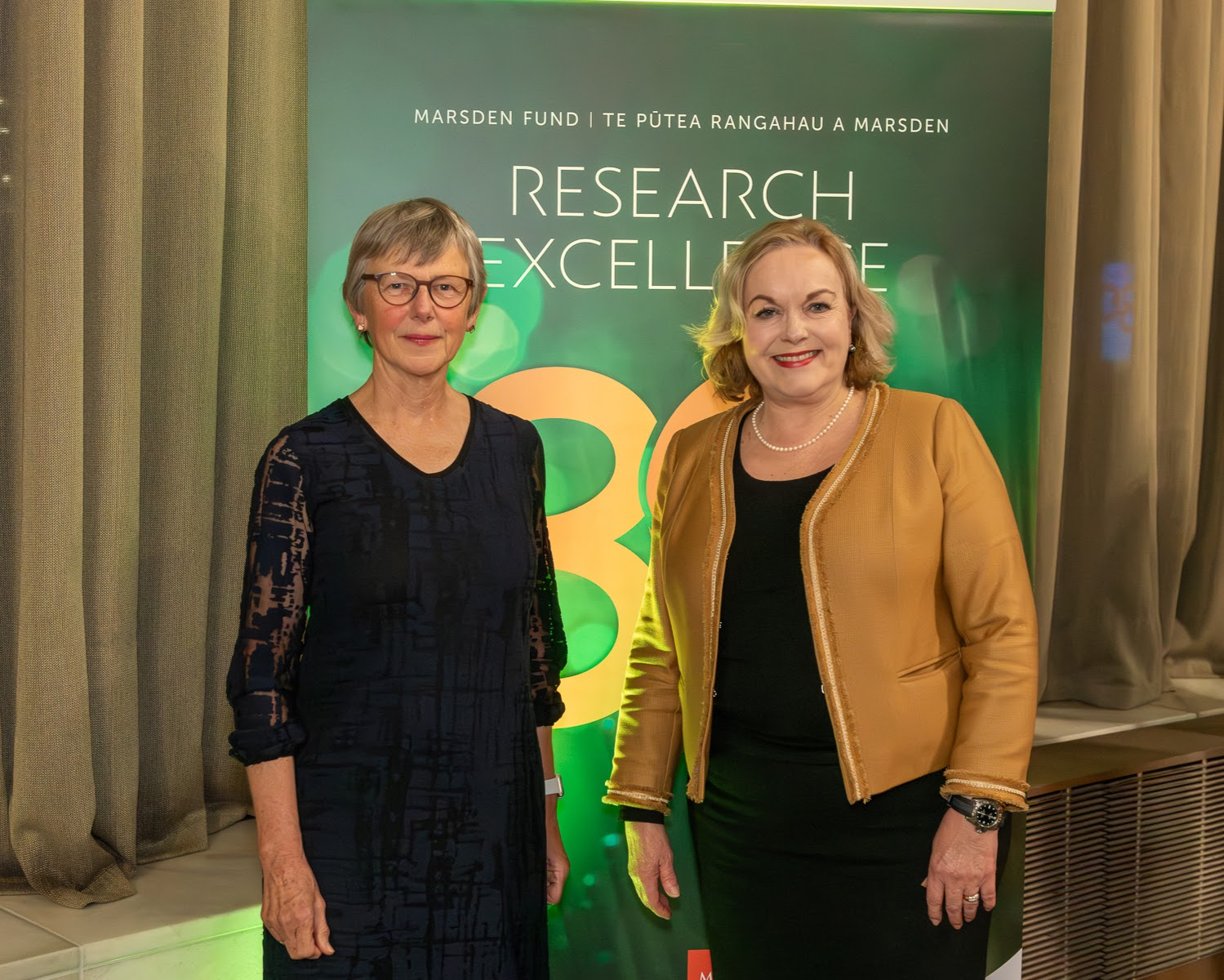
Collins (right) and Marsden Fund Council Chair Gillian Dobbie at an event to commemorate the thirtieth anniversary of the Marsden Fund

In the 2023 election held on 14 October, Collins retained her Papakura electorate seat by a margin of 13,519 votes over Labour candidate Anahila Kanongata'a-Suisuiki.

On 27 November 2023, Collins assumed seven ministerial portfolios in the National-led coalition government, namely: Attorney-General, Minister of Defence, Minister for Digitising Government, Minister Responsible for the GCSB, Minister Responsible for the NZSIS, Minister of Science, Innovation and Technology, and Minister for Space. Collins is the first woman to serve as Defence minister. She holds the largest number of portfolios among ministers in the government. On 15 December, Collins was appointed King's Counsel by Christopher Luxon in recognition of "her career achievements and the responsibility she holds on behalf of the Crown".

During a cabinet reshuffle that occurred on 19 January 2025, Collins assumed the public services portfolio from Nicola Willis. In addition, Shane Reti assumed Collins's science, innovation and technology ministerial portfolio.

=== Minister for the GCSB ===
On 8 December 2023 Collins, in her capacity as GCSB Minister, joined New Zealand's Five Eyes allies in condemning the Russian Federal Security Service (FSB) for conducting a series of cyber attacks on British politicians, civil servants, journalists, think tanks, academics, and other public figures.

=== Attorney-General ===
On 20 December Collins, in her capacity as Attorney-General, confirmed six judicial appointments: Supreme Court Judge Forrest Miller, Court of Appeal justices Susan Thomas, Rebecca Ellis and Francis Cooke, High Court Chief Judge Sally Fitzgerald, and High Court justice Karen Grau.

Collins delivered a keynote address on constitutional and rule of law challenges in the current global environment to Western Sydney University on 29 October 2024. After her presentation she was named an adjunct professor in the university's school of law.

In late June 2025, lawyer Tudor Clee sued Collins, in her capacity as Attorney-General, and former Speaker Trevor Mallard on behalf of a child who participated in the 2022 Wellington protest on Parliament's grounds. The plaintiff has sought a declaration that their rights were breached when Mallard played repetitive "bad" music over loudspeakers as well as NZ$40,000 in damages for three separate breaches. These breaches included two breaches of the Bill of Rights' right not to be subject to torture or cruel treatment, the right to freedom of association, and a third tort claim alleging that a public official abused their power. The case is expected to be heard at the Wellington High Court on 7 July. In response, a spokesperson for the Crown Law Office confirmed that Collins was seeking legal advice on how to respond to the claim.

In late July 2025, Collins expressed concern that the Government's proposed electoral law changes banning voter enrolment in the 13 days leading up to election day could breach the New Zealand Bill of Rights Act 1990. Collins's report said that these proposed changes could adversely affect young people along with Māori, Pasifika and Asian voters. Earlier, Justice Minister Paul Goldsmith had announced that the Government would amend electoral legislation to restrict voter enrolment, ban free food, drink or entertainment within 100 metres of a voting place. In addition, the Government will ban all prisoners from voting.

=== Minister of Defence ===
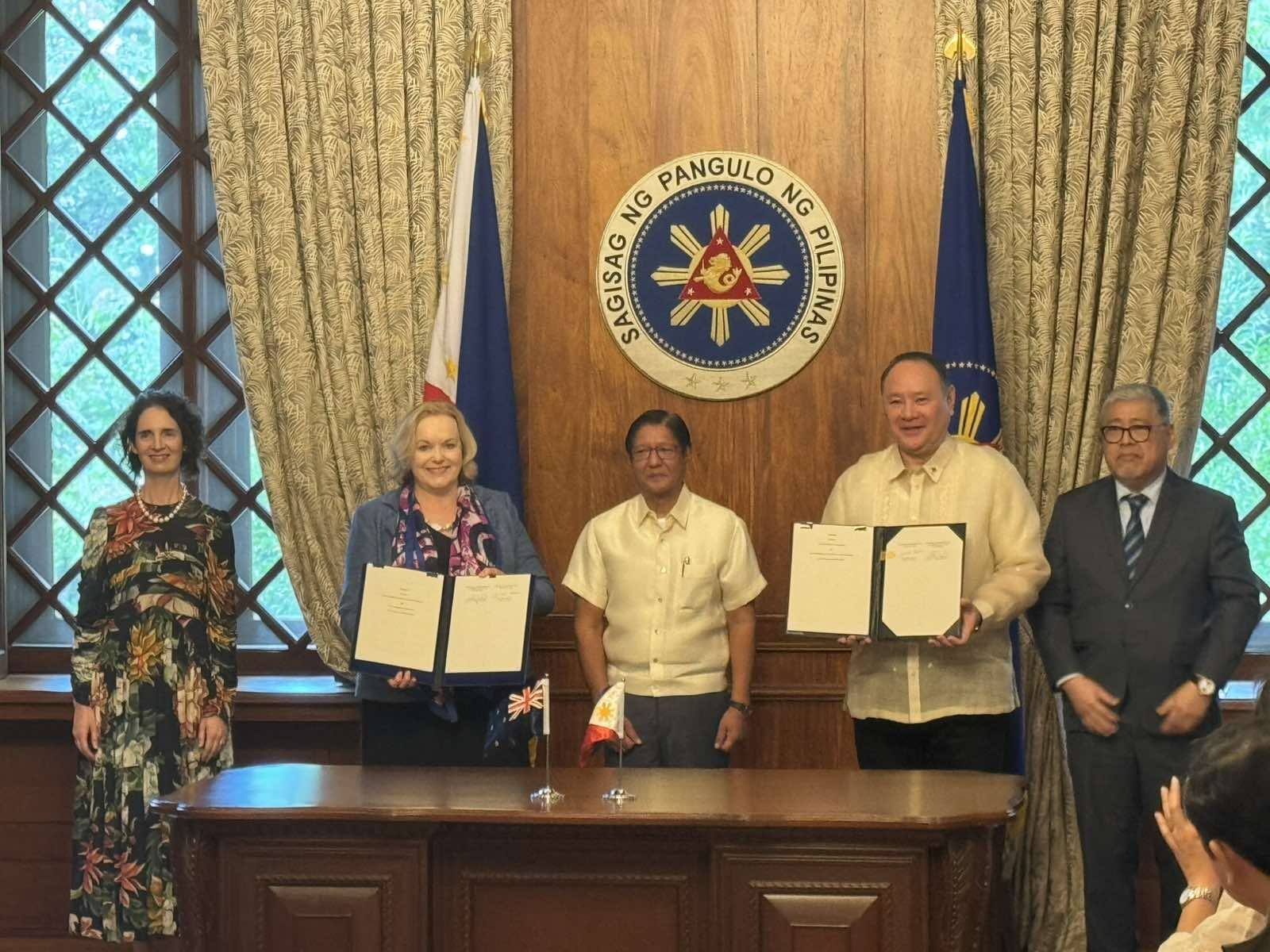
Collins (second from the left) upon signing the Visiting Forces Agreement (VFA) between New Zealand and the Philippines at Malacañang Palace in Manila on 30 April 2025. Philippine President Bongbong Marcos (center) witnessed the signing.

On 12 January 2024, Collins expressed New Zealand's support for Anglo-American airstrikes against Iranian-backed Houthi forces in Yemen, which had been disrupting international shipping in response to the Gaza war. She called the airstikes a "good example of the international community uniting to address a serious threat to international security" and reaffirmed the New Zealand Defence Force's (NZDF) commitment to supporting international maritime security.

On 22 February 2024, Collins confirmed that the NZDF's European deployment to train Ukrainian soldiers would be extended to June 2025. She also announced that the NZ military deployment's training mandate will be expanded from July 2024 to include specialised training in combat casualty care, combat engineering, leadership, and maritime explosive ordnance disposal training.

In November 2024, Collins invoked Section 9 of the Defence Act 1990 to cancel holiday leave for NZDF personnel in order to cover striking civilian security guards at military installations during the 2024–2025 Christmas and New Year holiday period. Collins's decision was criticised by the lobby group Mission Homefront, who said that the "use of the temporary power undermined the crucial interdependency with civilian staff."

On 7 April 2025, Collins announced that the New Zealand Government would be investing NZ$12 billion (US$5 billion) in the NZDF over the next four years to boost defence spending to over 2 percent of gross domestic product. On 6 May, Collins confirmed that the Government would allocate NZ$2 billion (US$1.2 billion) from this defence funding allocation to purchasing new maritime helicopters for the Royal New Zealand Navy.

On 30 April 2025, during a visit to Manila, Collins signed a Visiting Forces Agreement (VFA) with Philippine Defense Secretary Gilbert Teodoro. The agreement allows the NZDF to conduct joint military exercises with the Armed Forces of the Philippines in either country. Collins cited the "deteriorating" security environment in the Indo-Pacific as a key reason for the VFA, emphasising the need to uphold a liberal international order and the United Nations Convention on the Law of the Sea in the region.

During the 2025 Shangri-La Dialogue held in Singapore in early June 2025, Collins expressed support for the second Trump Administration's Golden Dome missile defense system, saying "I don't see it as an attack mechanism. It's a defence mechanism." The New Zealand-founded and California-based Rocket Lab had recently acquired the Arizona company Geost, which is involved in the Golden Dome project.

On 4 July 2025, Collins announced the reactivation of the No. 62 Squadron RNZAF as the New Zealand Defence Force's first dedicated space force unit. On 21 August, Collins and Foreign Minister Peters announced that the Government would purchase two Airbus A321XLR jets for the Royal New Zealand Air Force and five new MH-60R Seahawks for the Royal New Zealand Navy as part of its long-term investment in upgrading the New Zealand Defence Force's capabilities.

In early September 2025, Collins visited Ukraine, Poland and the United Kingdom to reinforce New Zealand's defence and security relations with those countries. In Kyiv, she met several senior Ukrainian officials including Defense Minister Denys Shmyhal, Foreign Minister Andrii Sybiha, Ukrainian Deputy Defense Minister Oleksandr Kozenko and the head of Kyiv's city military administration Tymur Tkachenko. Collins also visited a former apartment building that had been destroyed by Russian missiles in June 2025 and the Wall of Remembrance. In Warsaw, she met several senior Polish officials including Deputy Foreign Minister Władysław Teofil Bartoszewski and Deputy Prime Minister and Minister of National Defence Władysław Kosiniak-Kamysz. She also laid a wreath at the Tomb of the Unknown Soldier. Collins is also expected to visit the United Kingdom to reinforce the Five Eyes bilateral relationship before returning to New Zealand on 13 September.

In early October 2025, Collins and Associate-Defence Minister Chris Penk launched the Government's Defence Industry Strategy, which seeks to encourage New Zealand companies to export "lethal weapons" to the international market. She cited the example of Tauranga-based company SYOS Aerospace recently securing a NZ$67 million deal with the United Kingdom to export unmanned systems to Ukraine.

In mid-March 2026, Collins and Foreign Minister Winston Peters met with their Australian counterparts Richard Marles and Penny Wong during the third annual Australia and New Zealand Foreign and Defence Ministers' Meeting (ANZMIN) in Canberra to discuss foreign policy and defence issues of interests to both countries. During the meeting, Collins and Marles issued a joint statement expressing concern about Chinese assertiveness in the South China Sea including a recent close collision between Chinese and Australian military helicopters. They and their colleagues also expressed concerns about human rights violations in Tibet, Xinjiang and Hong Kong. In response, the Chinese Embassy in New Zealand criticised the New Zealand and Australian governments for interfering in Chinese internal affairs, their alleged silence on US military actions during the 2026 Iran war and their alleged "poor records" on human rights and ethnic minorities.

=== Minister of Science, Innovation and Technology ===
On 13 August 2024, Collins as the Minister of Science, Innovation and Technology announced that the Government would introduce legislation to end the ban on genetic modification and genetic engineering outside laboratories. This new law will be based on Australia's Gene Technology Act 2000. Collins also confirmed that the Government would establish a national regulator to manage the risks associated with genetic modification and engineering.

On 4 December 2024, Collins announced that the Government would end Marsden grants for humanities and social science research in order to focus on "core sciences" like physics, chemistry, mathematics, engineering and biomedical sciences that would boost economic growth, scientific and technological development.

=== Privileges Committee ===
As Chairperson of the New Zealand Parliament's Privileges Committee, Collins presided over privileges proceedings against three Te Pāti Māori MPs Hana-Rawhiti Maipi-Clarke, co-leaders Rawiri Waititi and Debbie Ngarewa-Packer, who had disrupted the first reading of the controversial Treaty Principles Bill on 14 November 2024 by staging a haka (Ka Mate) in protest. When the three MPs refused to participate in the privileges committee's hearing, Collins confirmed that the proceedings would go ahead regardless of their cooperation. On 14 May, the Privileges Committee found the three Te Pāti Māori MPs in contempt of Parliament and suspended Maipi-Clarke for seven days and Waititi and Ngarewa-Packer for 21 days. Following the ruling, Collins refused to confirm whether Parliamentary protocol would be updated to accommodate more Tikanga Māori.

During a Parliamentary debate held on 20 May to consider the Privileges Committee's sanctions against the three Te Pāti Māori MPs, Collins defended their suspension, describing their conduct as a "serious incident." Her colleague Leader of the House Chris Bishop successfully moved a motion that the suspension debate be delayed until 5 June, allowing the Te Pāti Māori MPs to participate in the upcoming debate around the 2025 New Zealand budget. On 5 June, Parliament voted along party lines to suspend the three TPM MPs.

=== Resignation ===
On 28 January 2026, Collins announced she had been appointed as president of the New Zealand Law Commission, and that she would retire from politics "in the middle of the year". Following a cabinet reshuffle, Chris Penk assumed her defence, space, GCSB, and NZSIS portfolios while Chris Bishop became Attorney-General and Paul Goldsmith gained the digitising government portfolio, on 7 April 2026. Collins gave her valedictory speech to Parliament on 12 May 2026, and her resignation took effect at 11:59 pm on 14 May 2026.

== Political views ==
Collins has been described as a conservative. She is seen to represent the right wing of her party, and in her previous roles as Minister of Police and Minister of Corrections, she has promoted law and order policies. Collins has praised former British Prime Minister Margaret Thatcher.

In 2003, Collins voted against the Death with Dignity Bill, which aimed to legalise euthanasia in New Zealand, but in 2020 voted in support of the End of Life Choice Bill to legalise assisted dying.

Collins has a mixed record on LGBT issues. In 2004, she voted against the Civil Union Act 2004 and the Relationships (Statutory References) Act 2004, stating not because of any sort of homophobic views but because it created a parallel form of marriage. In Parliament she stated, "This Bill is a sop to gay couples, in which they are being told that they can have second best. That is not good enough." She later voted for the Marriage (Gender Clarification) Amendment Bill 2005, which would have amended the Marriage Act to define marriage as only between a man and a woman. In 2013, however, Collins voted for the Marriage (Definition of Marriage) Amendment Bill, a bill allowing same-sex couples to marry in New Zealand.

In 2005, Collins voted for the Sale of Liquor (Youth Alcohol Harm Reduction) Act, a bill aimed at raising the drinking age to 20 years. In 2012, in her role as Minister of Justice, she introduced the Alcohol Reform Bill, a bill that introduced several restrictions on sale of alcohol including stricter opening hours for bars or liquor stores (but ultimately did not raise the drinking age).

In 2009, Collins voted against the Misuse of Drugs (Medicinal Cannabis) Amendment Bill, a bill aimed at amending the Misuse of Drugs Act to allow the use of cannabis for medical purposes. In 2020, Collins voted no to legalising cannabis in the 2020 New Zealand cannabis referendum.

In 2011, Collins pledged to support abortion-law changes which would make it illegal to perform an abortion on someone under the age of 16 without parental notification. Collins had proposed adding this to the Care of Children Act in 2004. In 2020, she supported the Abortion Legislation Act 2020, which decriminalised abortion.

In June 2021, Collins defended the advocacy group Speak Up For Women, a group opposed to gender self-identification, which had been prevented from hosting a meeting at a Christchurch City Library venue on the grounds of alleged transphobia.

In August 2021, Collins called for a referendum on the growing use of Aotearoa, the Māori-language name for New Zealand, in official documents and statements. This was in spite of the fact that Collins had used the name several times during her time as a minister in the previous Fifth National Government.

== Public image ==
Collins has been nicknamed "Crusher Collins", which stems from her policy as Minister of Police to crush the cars of speeding drivers. She has also been subject to ridicule after using her Samoan husband's ethnicity to "shield herself" from accusations of racism and a lack of diversity in her shadow cabinet. She has won a mixture of light-hearted admiration and disapproval for her "tough image" and tongue-in-cheek hubris, to the extent that she was indirectly referred to by Prime Minister Jacinda Ardern as a "Karen" in 2021.

== Bibliography ==
- Pull No Punches: Memoir of a Political Survivor. (2020) ISBN 9781988547510

New Zealand Parliament
| Vacant Title last held by Warren Kyd | Member of Parliament for Clevedon; 2002–2008 | Constituency abolished |
| Vacant Title last held by John Robertson | Member of Parliament for Papakura; 2008–2026 | Vacant |
Political offices
| Preceded by Annette King | Minister of Police; 2008–2011; 2015–2016 | Succeeded by Anne Tolley |
| Preceded by Michael Woodhouse | Minister of Police; 2008–2011; 2015–2016 | Succeeded by Paula Bennett |
| Preceded by Phil Goff | Minister of Corrections; 2008–2011; 2015–2016 | Succeeded by Anne Tolley |
| Preceded by Sam Lotu-Iiga | Minister of Corrections; 2008–2011; 2015–2016 | Succeeded by Louise Upston |
| Preceded by Rick Barker | Minister of Veterans' Affairs; 2008–2011 | Succeeded by Nathan Guy |
| Preceded by Simon Power | Minister of Justice; 2011–2014 | Succeeded by Amy Adams |
| Preceded by Nick Smith | Minister for ACC; 2011–2014 | Succeeded by Nikki Kaye |
| Preceded by Hekia Parata | Minister of Ethnic Affairs; 2011–2014; 2016–2017 | Succeeded by Sam Lotu-Iiga |
| Preceded by Sam Lotu-Iiga | Minister of Ethnic Affairs; 2011–2014; 2016–2017 | Succeeded by Jenny Salesa |
| Preceded by Michael Woodhouse | Minister of Revenue; 2016–2017 | Succeeded by Stuart Nash |
| Preceded by Simon Bridges | Minister of Energy and Resources; 2016–2017 | Succeeded by Megan Woods |
| Preceded by Todd Muller | Leader of the Opposition; 2020–2021 | Succeeded by Christopher Luxon |
Party political offices
| Preceded by Todd Muller | Leader of the National party 2020–2021 | Succeeded by Christopher Luxon |
Honorary titles
| Preceded by Nanaia Mahuta | Mother of the House; 2023–2026 | Succeeded by Melissa Lee |
