= July 2020 New Zealand National Party leadership election =

- 14 July 2020
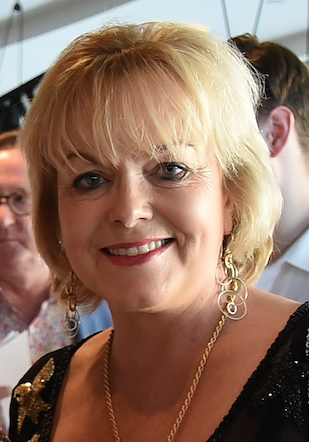

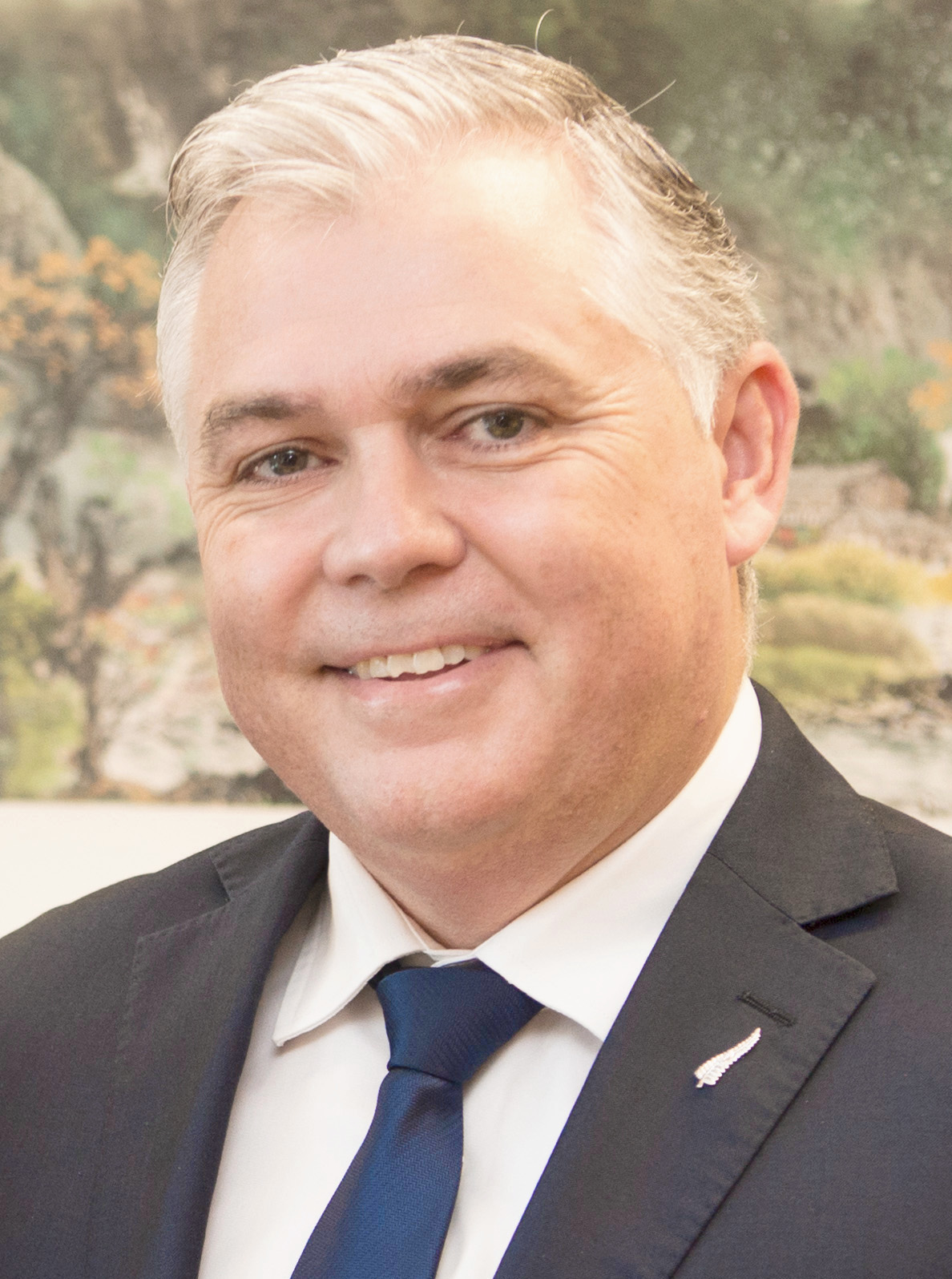
Candidate	Judith Collins	Mark Mitchell
Popular vote	≥28	<28
Leader before election
- Nikki Kaye (acting)
- Todd Muller (resigned)
Leader after election
Judith Collins

July 2020 New Zealand National Party deputy leadership election
- 14 July 2020
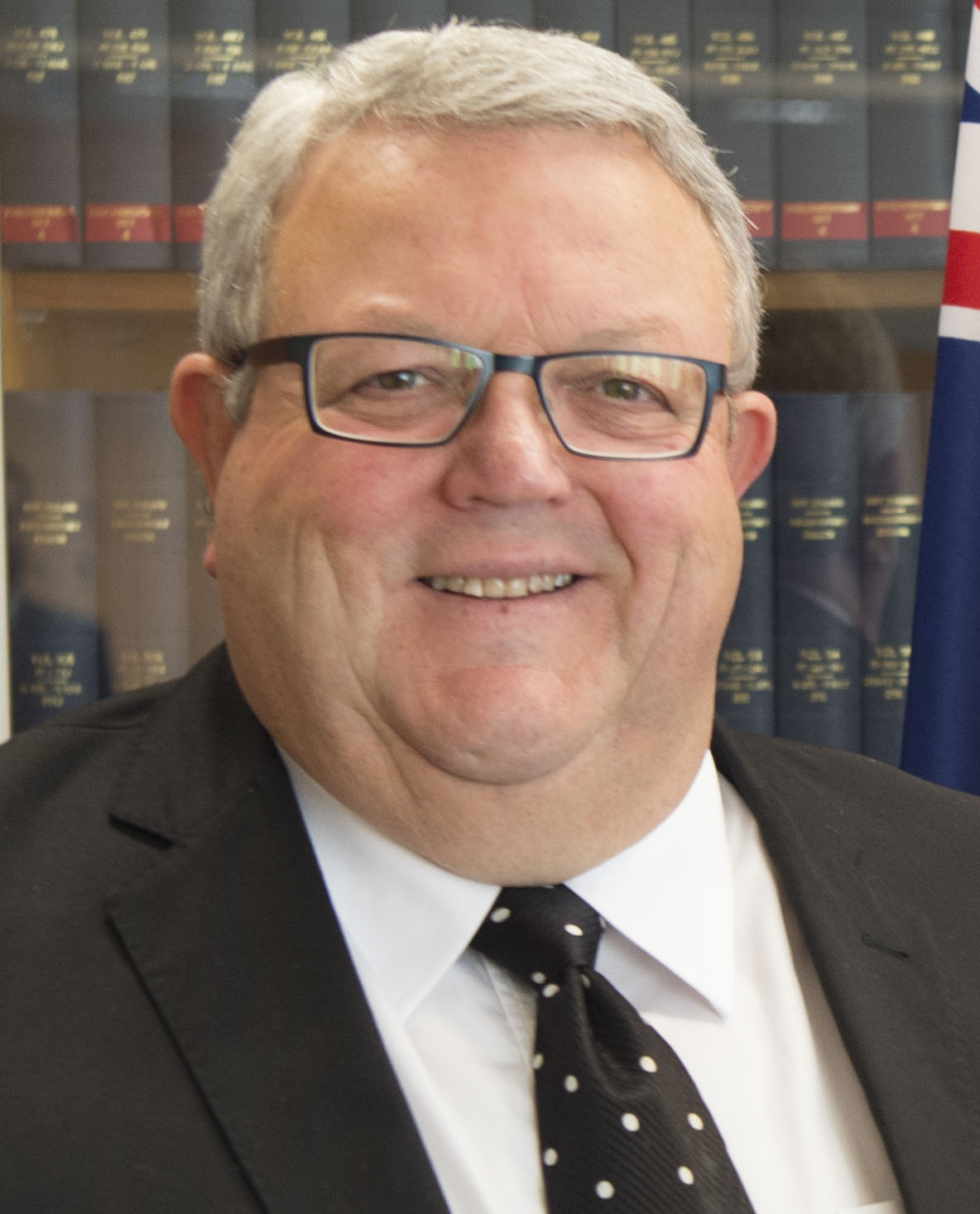

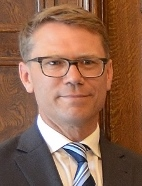
Candidate	Gerry Brownlee	Paul Goldsmith
Popular vote	≥28	<28
Deputy Leader before election
Nikki Kaye
Deputy Leader after election
Gerry Brownlee

An election for the parliamentary leadership of the New Zealand National Party by its caucus was held on 14 July 2020, after incumbent Todd Muller resigned earlier that day citing health reasons. Judith Collins became leader of the National Party and of the Opposition of New Zealand.

== Background ==
Todd Muller became Leader of the National Party following a party caucus vote on 22 May 2020. Poor polling results for the National Party had led to Muller and Nikki Kaye standing against incumbents Simon Bridges and Paula Bennett for leader and deputy leader respectively. Muller became the third Leader of the Opposition for the 52nd parliament, following Bill English and Simon Bridges.

Muller led the National Party in Parliament for 53 days. He reshuffled his shadow cabinet twice, announced policies in preparation for the 2020 New Zealand general election campaign, and dealt with a controversy in the National Party when National MP Hamish Walker and former party president Michelle Boag leaked private information about COVID-19 patients. Election billboards had started being erected with his image alongside the National MP contesting the relevant electorate.

Muller would later reveal that he suffered severe panic attacks, starting five days after his election, which became worse as the days went on, until he found himself unable to get out of bed. On the morning of 14 July 2020 Muller released a statement announcing his resignation as National Party leader, saying "the role has taken a heavy toll on me personally, and on my family, and this has become untenable from a health perspective."

The National Party caucus held an emergency meeting over the Internet on the morning of 14 July 2020 and appointed deputy leader Nikki Kaye as the interim leader pending the convening of an in-person meeting that evening. News site Stuff understood that Muller did not participate in the morning meeting.

== Candidates ==
=== Known candidates ===
Judith Collins ran for the leadership position. Collins had officially run for leader twice before, in 2016 and 2018. Mark Mitchell also ran; this was confirmed by Simon Bridges who said that he voted for Mitchell, though Collins would not say if anyone else had run against her in the meeting or not.

Gerry Brownlee ran for the deputy position. Stuff understood that Paul Goldsmith had run as well. Newshub reported that Louise Upston had intended to contest the deputy position but withdrew after Collins won the first ballot. As with the leadership contest, Collins would not say who had run for deputy.

Amy Adams refused to say if she had contested either position.

=== Speculated candidates ===
Other National MPs were speculated by media to be possible candidates for the leadership election, including:

- Paula Bennett, MP for Upper Harbour, former Deputy Prime Minister and former Deputy Leader of the National Party;
- Chris Bishop, MP for Hutt South;
- Shane Reti, MP for Whangarei.

Simon Bridges, MP for Tauranga and former leader of the National Party, was speculated as being a possible leadership candidate, but ruled out a bid. Nikki Kaye, MP for Auckland Central and was Deputy Leader of the National Party under Muller and interim Leader on 14 July 2020, was also speculated to be a candidate, but said afterwards that she did not seek either the leader or deputy leader position, and shortly afterward announced her retirement from politics.

== Result ==
Judith Collins won the election and became the leader of the National Party. Gerry Brownlee was selected as the party's deputy leader at the same meeting. The result was announced on the evening of 14 July; the final count and who voted for whom was not announced. Collins would not confirm if Brownlee was her preferred choice for deputy.

== Aftermath ==
On 15 July, the day after the election, Collins stripped Michael Woodhouse of the health portfolio for his involvement in the leaks of COVID-19 patient data. The day after that, MPs Nikki Kaye and Amy Adams announced their resignations from politics. Kaye, who had been deputy leader under Todd Muller, said that the resignation was despite Collins offering her a senior leadership position. Adams had previously said she would leave parliament at the 2020 election, but was an ally of Muller and changed her mind after Muller's appointment; following Muller's resignation and Collins' election, Adams reverted to her decision to leave Parliament altogether. Also on 16 July, Collins announced a reshuffle of her shadow cabinet. As part of a number of changes, former leaders Simon Bridges and Todd Muller both received front bench roles, while Mark Mitchell lost his justice portfolio and was demoted 6 places in the party rankings.

Collins led the National Party for 16 months. She led the party during the 2020 general election, where it received 26% of the vote and 33 seats in Parliament (down from 44% and 56 seats in 2017). Collins' position was reconfirmed in a post-election vote on the leadership, required under the party's constitution, while Brownlee stood aside as deputy leader and was replaced in that role by Shane Reti. However, Collins was voted out of the leadership role in November 2021.
