= Judith Collins (professor) =

Judith Collins (died 2014), also known as Judith Tate-Collins, was a university lecturer and researcher at Durham University. She was Deaf and a British Sign Language user.

== Biography ==
Collins was born to a deaf family. She worked as a teacher and researcher at Durham University for more than 20 years. She began as a Teaching Fellow at the University of Durham in the Deaf Studies Research Unit (DSRU), joining in 1991 as one of the first Deaf academics to be appointed by the university. She taught on a range of postgraduate courses and contributed to research projects in the fields of Deaf Studies, Deaf Education and Sign Linguistics. She was member of the team that produced the first British Sign Language Dictionary in 1993, a dictionary containing over 1800 depictions of signs, along with their definition and explanation.

Upon the closure of the DSRU in 2000, Collins transferred to the Modern Language Centre and the School of Linguistics and Language, teaching Sign Language undergraduate modules. Her research interests included the translation into BSL of assessments for Deaf children, and the provision of interpreter services in the UK. In particular, she co-ordinated and contributed to teaching a BSL/English interpreter programme. She was also a representative on the executive of the Association of Sign Language Interpreters (ASLI) for the ASLI Deaf Interpreters Network, and she was involved in the setting up of the Deaf Interpreter Consortium in 2007.

In 2005, she was elected for a three-year term as a member of the Senate of Durham University as one of the representatives of academic staff of the university. She was believed to be the first native BSL user to be a member of the highest formal academic planning body of a university.

She was ill with cancer in 1987, after which she helped setting up the Deaf Women's Health Organisation, of which she remained Patron until her death in 2014.
