= 2021 New Zealand National Party leadership election =

Party election to succeed Judith Collins

- 30 November 2021

33 New Zealand National Party members of the New Zealand Parliament 17 members needed to win
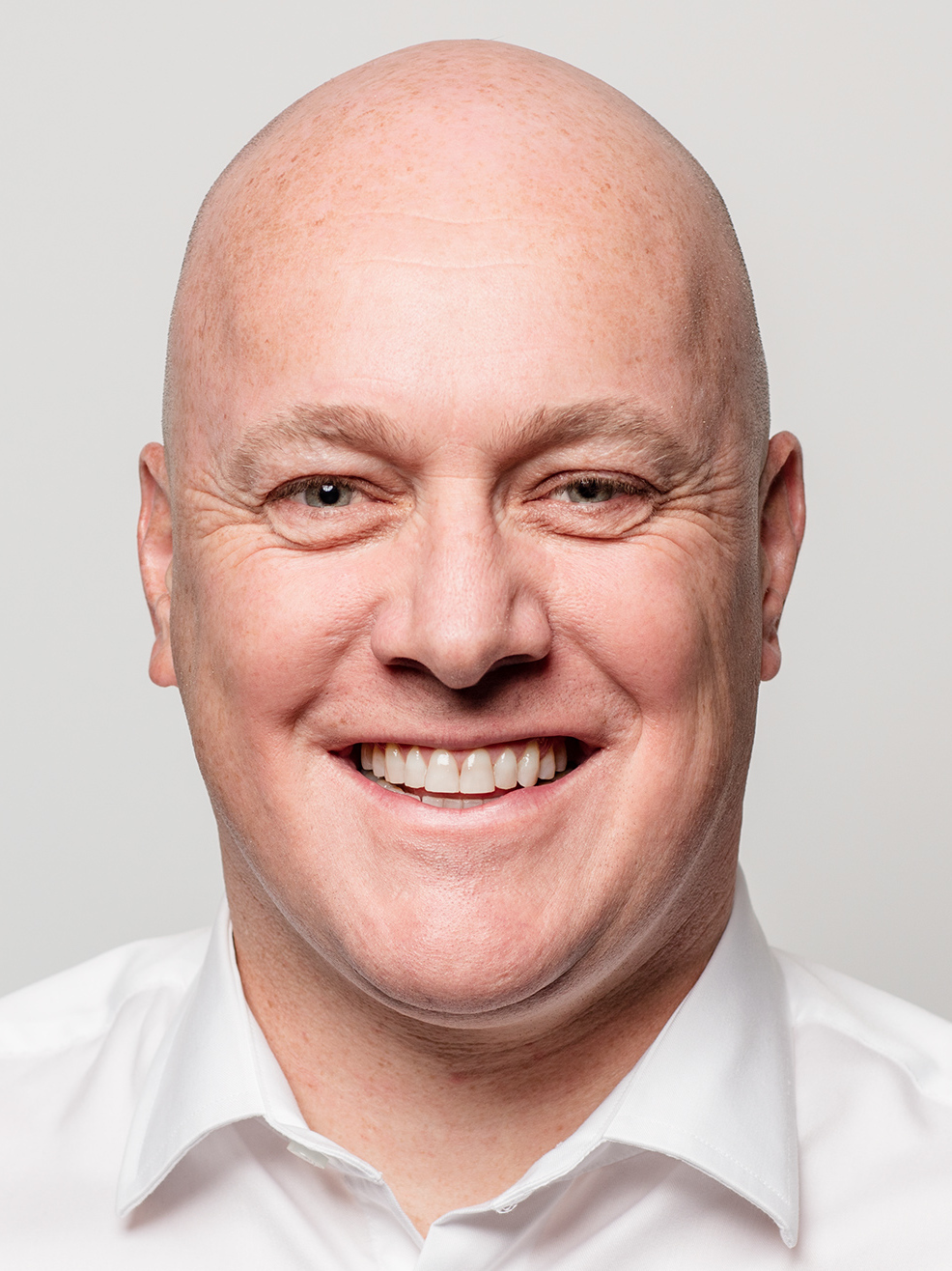

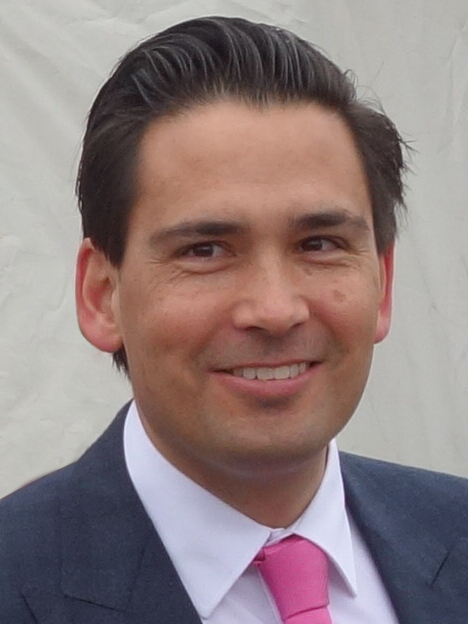
Candidate	Christopher Luxon	Simon Bridges
Caucus vote	Unopposed	Withdrew
Leader before election
Shane Reti (interim)
Judith Collins
Leader after election
Christopher Luxon
- Deputy leadership election
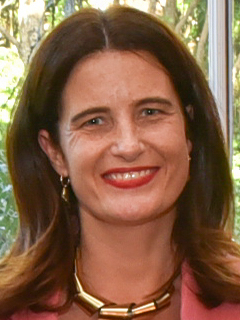
Candidate	Nicola Willis
Caucus vote	Unopposed
Deputy Leader before election
Shane Reti
Deputy Leader after election
Nicola Willis

An election was held for the position of leader of the New Zealand National Party on 30 November 2021, following the removal of leader Judith Collins in a vote of no confidence on 25 November.

Simon Bridges was the only person to publicly announce his candidacy. About an hour before the National Party caucus was set to meet, he withdrew from the race and endorsed Christopher Luxon. Being the only candidate, Luxon was elected unopposed to the position.

== Background ==
Judith Collins was elected leader of the New Zealand National Party on 14 July 2020 following the sudden resignation of Todd Muller for health reasons. She went on to lead the National Party to its second-worst result in the 2020 election. Opinion polling for National did not significantly improve in the following year and Collins' approval rating remained low. Instead, the ACT party made significant gains and leader David Seymour overtook Collins in preferred prime minister polling. This led to frequent media speculation that a leadership contest was imminent, with former leader Simon Bridges and first-term MP Christopher Luxon seen as the most likely candidates. A November 2021 Newshub–Reid Research poll of all voters as to their preferred National Party leader found that 40.7% favoured Bridges while 23.2% favoured Collins, with the rest unsure; of National voters, Bridges was on 41.8% and Collins on 39.9%.

Late at night on 24 November 2021, Collins suddenly demoted Bridges and stripped him of his portfolios over a complaint about alleged comments he made to fellow National MP Jacqui Dean in 2017. Dean had complained at the time and Bridges had apologised. Collins claimed she had the unanimous support of the party's Board of Directors in her decision, a claim which was later rejected by party president Peter Goodfellow. She planned to hold a press conference with Dean the next morning. Bridges and other MPs accused Collins of using the complaint for political gain. On the morning of 25 November, Collins was removed as leader by a vote of no confidence during a three-hour caucus meeting. She had held the position for 16 months.

Deputy leader Shane Reti was made interim leader until a leadership election was held the following week.

== Candidates ==
Various MPs were discussed as potential candidates, including Chris Bishop, Mark Mitchell, Shane Reti, and Nicola Willis, however by 29 November the race was believed to have come down former leader and Tauranga MP Simon Bridges, and first term Botany MP Christopher Luxon.

Name	Positions	Reported caucus support	Endorsements
Simon Bridges	MP for Tauranga (since 2008); Leader of the National Party (2018–20); Leader of the Opposition (2018–20)	Todd McClay; Tim van de Molen	Liam Hehir, columnist and former National party activist.
Christopher Luxon	MP for Botany (since 2020); CEO of Air New Zealand (2012–19)	Judith Collins; Maureen Pugh; Harete Hipango; Andrew Bayly; David Bennett	John Key, Former National leader and Prime Minister.; Judith Collins, Former National leader and Leader of the Opposition.

=== Potential candidates who did not run ===
Several National MPs openly discussed running or were speculated by the media as potential candidates but eventually did not contest the leadership.

- Shane Reti – List MP (since 2020), MP for Whangārei (2014–20), Deputy Leader (2020–21), Acting Leader (2021)
- Nicola Willis – List MP (since 2018)
- Chris Bishop – List MP (2014–17 and since 2020), MP for Hutt South (2017–20)
- Mark Mitchell – MP for Whangaparāoa (since 2020), MP for Rodney (2011–20), leadership candidate in 2018 and July 2020

== Results ==
The day before the caucus meeting the MPs were reported as being split with 18 to Luxon and 15 to Bridges, seen as an indecisive result. Following negotiations to avoid a contest, Simon Bridges withdrew and Christopher Luxon was elected leader. At 409 days, this is the shortest period of time for an MP to ascend to the leadership of a major party after first entering parliament.

Wellington-based list MP Nicola Willis was elected deputy leader. Luxon had asked her to be his deputy and National MPs knew they were standing as a joint ticket.
