= Christopher Luxon =

Prime Minister of New Zealand since 2023

The Right Honourable Christopher Luxon MP
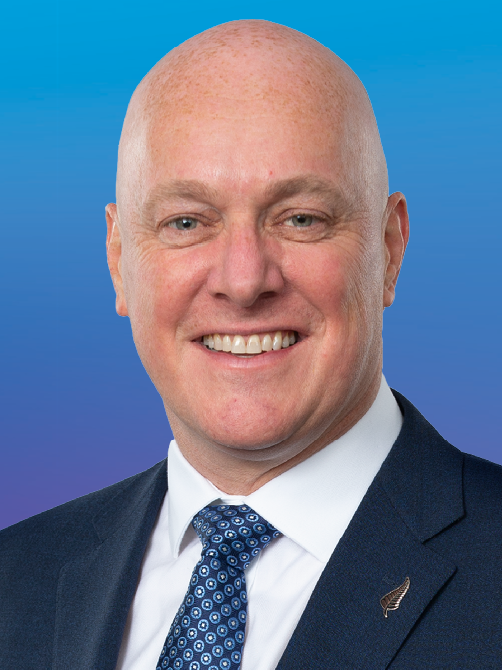
- Campaign portrait, 2023

42nd Prime Minister of New Zealand
- Incumbent
- Assumed office 27 November 2023
- Monarch: Charles III
- Governor-General: Cindy Kiro
- Deputy: Winston Peters; David Seymour
- Preceded by: Chris Hipkins

15th Leader of the National Party
- Incumbent
- Assumed office 30 November 2021
- Deputy: Nicola Willis
- Preceded by: Judith Collins

40th Leader of the Opposition
- In office 30 November 2021 – 27 November 2023
- Prime Minister: Jacinda Ardern; Chris Hipkins
- Deputy: Nicola Willis
- Preceded by: Judith Collins (Note: Shane Reti acted from 25 to 30 November 2021.)
- Succeeded by: Chris Hipkins

Member of the New Zealand Parliament for Botany
- Incumbent
- Assumed office 17 October 2020
- Preceded by: Jami-Lee Ross
- Majority: 16,337 (43.91%)

Personal details
- Born: Christopher Mark Luxon; 19 July 1970 (age 56) Christchurch, New Zealand
- Party: National
- Spouse: Amanda Luxon (m. 1994)
- Children: 2
- Education: University of Canterbury (BCom; MCom)
- Occupation: Politician; business executive
- Luxon's voice Luxon talking about the Christchurch Call in July 2024

Christopher Mark Luxon (born 19 July 1970) is a New Zealand politician and businessman who has served as the 42nd prime minister of New Zealand since 2023. A member of the National Party, he has been the member of Parliament (MP) for Botany since 2020 and previously served as leader of the Opposition from 2021 to 2023. Prior to entering politics, he was the chief executive officer (CEO) of Air New Zealand from 2013 to 2019.

Luxon grew up in Howick in East Auckland before studying commerce at the University of Canterbury. He joined Unilever in 1993 and held senior roles at Unilever Canada, becoming president and CEO of the subsidiary in 2008. In 2011, he left Unilever Canada and joined Air New Zealand as group general manager and became CEO in 2013. After stepping down as CEO of Air New Zealand in 2019, Luxon won the pre-selection for the safe National Party seat of Botany in East Auckland. He won the National Party leadership unopposed on 30 November 2021, eight months after giving his maiden speech, after the ousting of his predecessor. Luxon led his party to a plurality of seats at the 2023 general election. Luxon signed a coalition deal with ACT New Zealand and New Zealand First to form a majority, and was sworn in as prime minister on 27 November 2023.

Under Luxon's premiership, the Sixth National Government of New Zealand has shrunk New Zealand's civil service and attempted to boost the economy through international tourism. The government introduced cuts to healthcare expenditure, reintroduced a three-strikes sentencing law and a pilot military-style boot camp for youth offenders, and enacted NZ$14.7 billion in tax cuts. The government replaced the Three Waters reform programme with the Local Water Done Well policy, and minimised co-governance initiatives while discouraging the use of the Māori language alongside the English language in the public service. His government agreed to support the controversial Treaty Principles Bill to its first reading. In foreign policy, his government has increased military spending and Five Eyes cooperation in a general pro-United States shift. Luxon's coalition dynamics with his deputy prime ministers Winston Peters and David Seymour have proved controversial, given they have openly challenged his authority.

Rumours of potential challenges to his leadership in November 2025 and throughout 2026 led him to call a confidence vote in himself in April 2026, which he won. In August 2026 he survived a second confidence vote that was called by Chris Penk.

== Early life ==
Christopher Mark Luxon was born in Christchurch on 19 July 1970, to a Roman Catholic family of Irish, Scottish and English descent. His father, Graham Luxon, worked for Johnson & Johnson as a sales executive. His mother, Kathleen Luxon (née Turnbull), was a receptionist but subsequently enrolled in a Diploma of Social Work the same year that Chris started at university. She eventually worked as a psychotherapist and counsellor.

The family lived in Christchurch until Christopher was seven, when they moved to Howick in Auckland. After a year at Saint Kentigern College and another year at Howick College, the family returned to Christchurch and Luxon spent three years at Christchurch Boys' High School. While there, he won the prize for senior debating. He studied at the University of Canterbury from 1989 to 1992, gaining a Master of Commerce (Business Administration) degree.

He always wanted to be a businessman and said: "If you met me at 12 years old I'd be having window washing rounds, lawn mowing rounds and deck painting. I just loved it." During his high school and university years, Luxon worked part-time at McDonald's and as a porter at the Parkroyal Hotel.

== Business career ==
=== Unilever ===
Luxon worked for Unilever from 1993 to 2011, starting in Wellington as a management trainee for two years, leaving for Sydney in 1995. He worked his way up in the company, working in Sydney until 2000, in London from 2000 to 2003, and then Chicago from 2003 to 2008, becoming "Global Deodorants and Grooming Category" Director. In 2008 when Unilever restructured, he became president of the company's Canadian operations, based in Toronto. Altogether, he worked overseas for 16 years before returning to New Zealand.

=== Air New Zealand ===
Luxon joined Air New Zealand as group general manager in May 2011 and was named the chief executive officer on 19 June 2012, taking up the role at the end of that year. During his eight-year leadership, Air New Zealand profits grew to record levels. Important contributors to this were a booming tourism market; the company's decision to stop operating under-performing regional routes; and the cutting of hundreds of jobs. The company was named Australia's most trusted brand several times.

In 2014, Luxon joined the board of Virgin Australia representing Air NZ, which was then a major shareholder. In 2016, Air NZ decided it was no longer in its best interest to maintain a close connection with another airline so it sold its 25.9% stake in Virgin Australia. Luxon consequently left the Virgin board.

Luxon resigned from Air NZ in 2019, and hinted at a possible career with the National Party. He was encouraged in this by his close friend, former Prime Minister John Key, who said Luxon would be a "world class candidate" for the National Party.

== Personal wealth ==
As at March 2024, his net worth was estimated to be between NZ$21 million and NZ$30 million, which makes him the second-wealthiest leader of the National Party, after former Prime Minister John Key. He then owned seven properties, including a home in Remuera valued at NZ$7.68 million, and other assets collectively valued at over NZ$21 million. In late 2024, Luxon stated, "Let's be clear, I'm wealthy," in response to questions about his property sales and financial position.

After becoming prime minister, Luxon stayed in his own Wellington apartment and claimed a NZ$52,000 accommodation allowance, to which he said he was entitled. After public scrutiny began, he quickly changed his position, saying: "It's clear that the issue of my accommodation allowance is becoming a distraction" and "As such, I have decided today that I will no longer claim the allowance and will repay anything I have received since I became Prime Minister."

Luxon sold three of his properties in 2024 with Stuff estimating he could have made up to $769,500 in profit.

== Early political career ==
=== Member of Parliament ===
In November 2019, Luxon secured the National Party candidacy for the Botany electorate – which has always been won by National and was regarded as a safe seat for them – after Jami-Lee Ross resigned from the party.

New Zealand Parliament
Years	Term	Electorate	List	Party
2020–2023	53rd	Botany	61	National
2023–2026	54th	Botany	1	National
2026–present	55th	Botany	1	National

=== In Opposition (2020–2023) ===
Amid a sweep of National seats lost to Labour in the 2020 general election, Luxon won Botany with 52% of the vote. He was appointed as the spokesperson for local government, research, science, manufacturing and land information, as well as associate spokesperson for transport in the Shadow Cabinet of Judith Collins. After Collins was removed as party leader on 25 November, Luxon was cited as a potential replacement. On 30 November, after Bridges's withdrew from the National Party leadership election, Luxon was announced as the party's leader.

As Leader of the Opposition, Luxon used public funding to pay for Māori language (te reo) lessons. He defended using taxpayer money to pay for his Māori language lessons, stating that developing better skills in Māori was highly relevant to his role as Opposition leader and a potential Prime Minister. Once he became Prime Minister, the National-led coalition government considered discontinuing incentive payments for public servants to learn the Māori language.

== Prime Minister (2023–present) ==
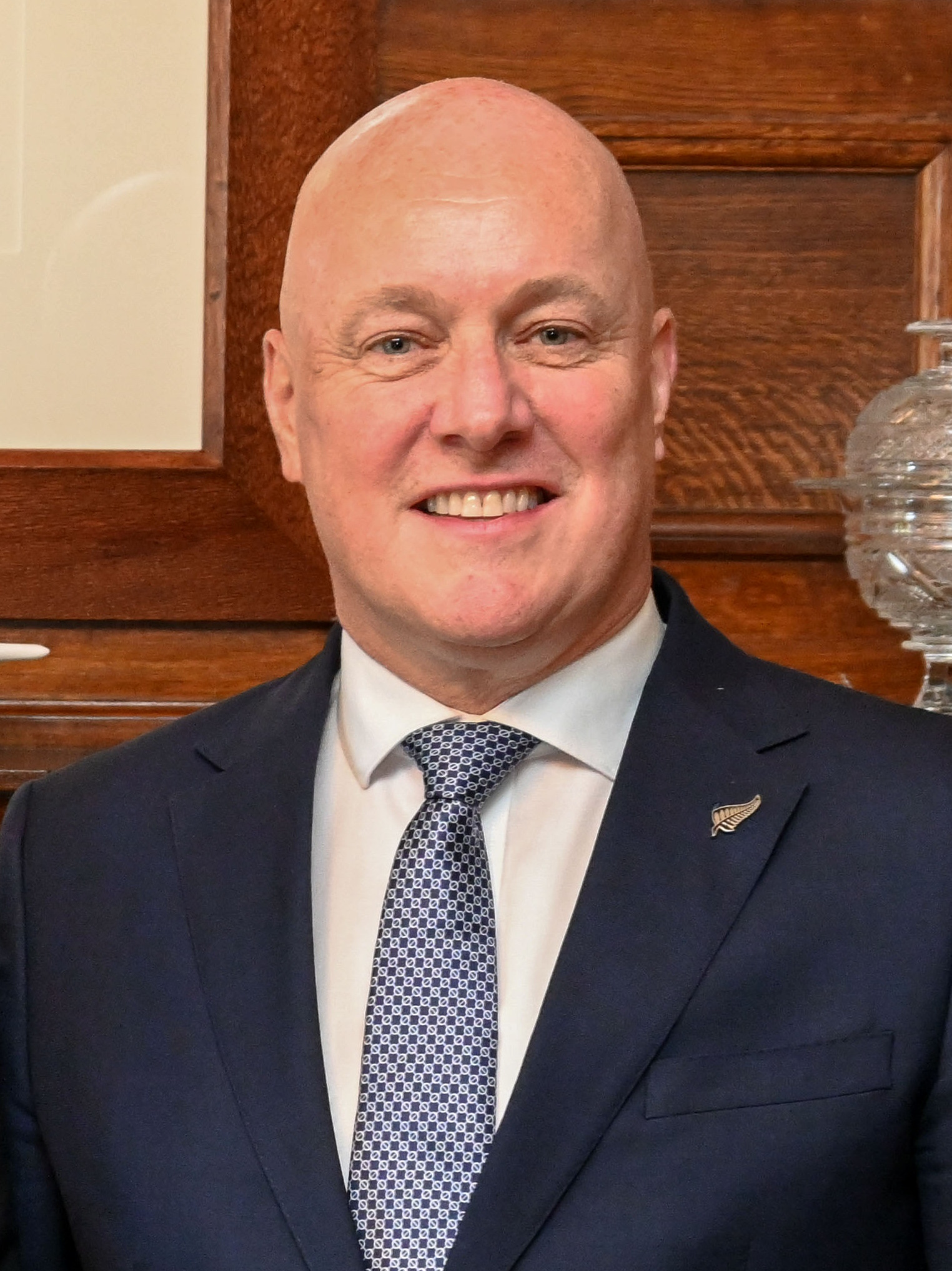
- Premiership of Christopher Luxon; 27 November 2023 – present
- Monarch: Charles III
- Cabinet: Sixth National Government
- Party: National
- Election: 2023
- Appointed by: Cindy Kiro
- Seat: The Beehive
- Coat of Arms of New Zealand

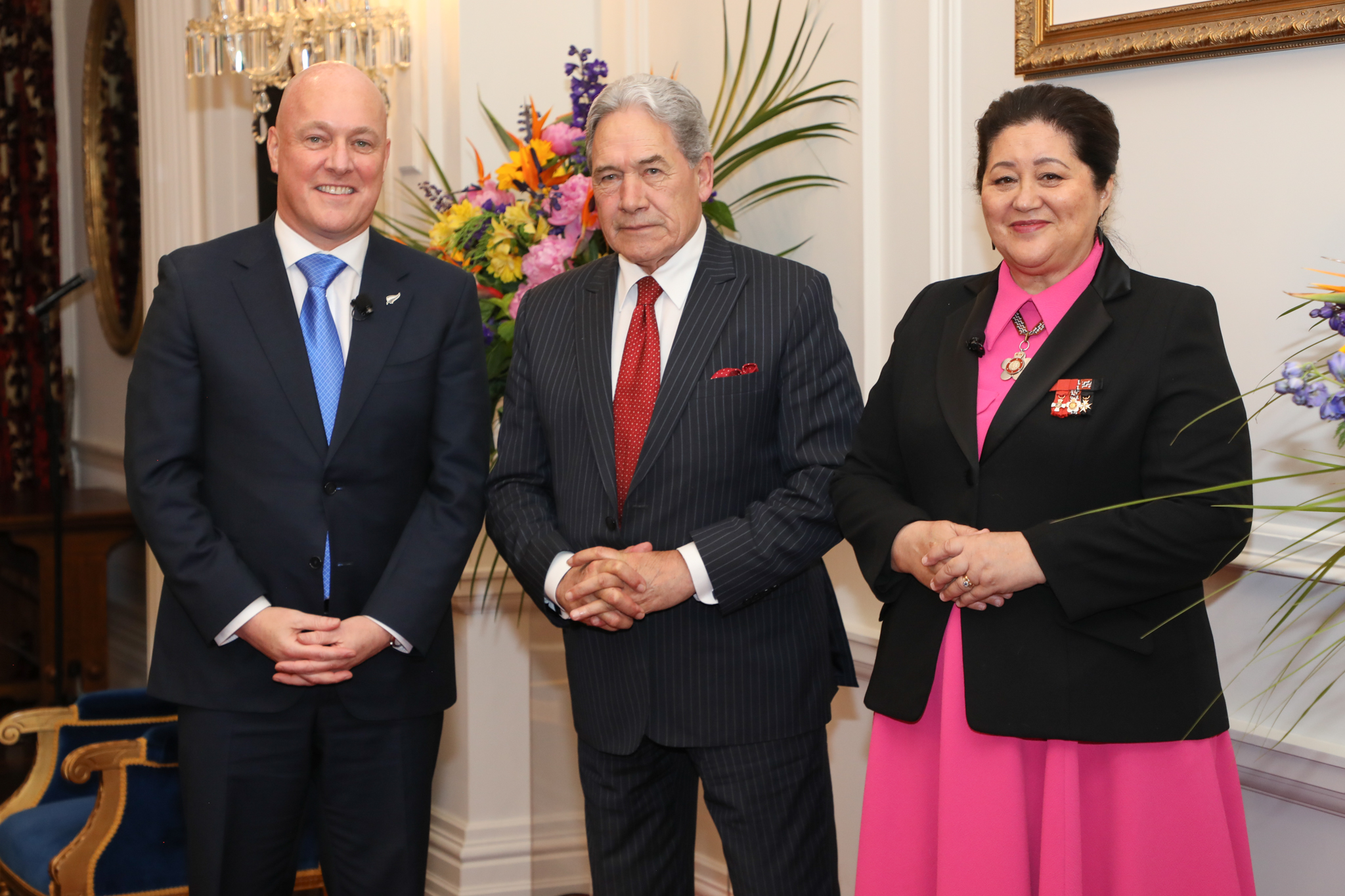
Luxon with Deputy Prime Minister Winston Peters and Governor-General Dame Cindy Kiro at the appointment of the new government, 27 November 2023

In the 2023 general election, Luxon retained his Botany electorate seat with 67% of the vote. The National Party won 38.1% of the party vote and 48 seats – the most of any party but not enough to govern outright.

=== Formation of coalition government ===
National required support from at least two other parties to form a government. They negotiated with ACT and New Zealand First for six weeks to produce New Zealand's first formal three-party coalition government. The negotiations took until 24 November and involved two separate coalition agreements – one between National and ACT, and one between National and New Zealand First – with each junior party formally committing to support the other's key priorities. Luxon was sworn in as prime minister by Governor-General Dame Cindy Kiro on 27 November.

=== Economic decline ===
On 18 February 2024, Luxon delivered his first State of the Nation address, in which he blamed the previous Labour Government for what he called the "precarious state of the economy". Luxon said that economic growth is the central theme of his government's agenda, that it is the solution to New Zealand's problems and key to improving living standards for all New Zealanders. He said his Government would restore the economy by cutting taxes (by $14.7 billion), reducing public spending and "red tape".

However, under his government, the economy entered a protracted recession, with per capita GDP falling 4.6% since September 2022 due to tight monetary policy combating inflation that peaked at 7.3%. Unemployment rose from 3.7% in June 2023 to 5.2% by late 2025.

As part of reducing Government spending, Luxon's government began implementing significant cutbacks to New Zealand's public service in late 2023. Radio New Zealand reported in May 2025 that the coalition had cut 9,500 public sector jobs. More than 240 government programmes have been scaled down or scrapped. Luxon has consistently articulated the rationale for these cuts, amounting to about $6 billion, and publicly defended the scale of job losses.

=== Health sector ===
New Zealand's health system faced severe strains before the coalition government came to power, primarily from workforce shortages, financial mismanagement, and long wait times for many services. Core problems included a significant shortage in the number of GPs leading to a massive increase in visits to hospital emergency departments plus financial mismanagement. Health NZ posted a $722 million deficit in 2023.

In response, the government replaced the board of Health NZ with a commissioner to improve performance and accountability. This was followed by multiple high-profile resignations, including the Director-General of Health, the Chief Executive of Health NZ, and the Director of Public Health. In January 2025, Luxon announced that Simeon Brown would replace Shane Reti as Minister of Health.

Under the coalition agreement with ACT and NZ First, Luxon controversially agreed to repeal New Zealand's smoke-free legislation that would have made it illegal for anyone born in 2008 or later to legally purchase tobacco. Researchers from the University of Otago warned that thousands of New Zealanders will die needlessly, and that the repeal "flies in the face of robust research evidence." Chris Hipkins suggested the government is "firmly in the pocket of the tobacco industry."

=== Law and order ===
Luxon's government promised on a "tough on crime" agenda based on tougher sentencing, expanded police powers and targeted measures on gangs and youth offending. His government:

- brought back the controversial three strikes regime, increasing mandatory sentencing for specified serious repeat offenders;
- brought back the boot‑camp model for serious and persistent young offenders, despite multiple studies, official data, and expert commentary spanning several decades which indicate that boot camps do not reduce reoffending. 80% of the participants in the pilot re-offended within 12-months which is the same rate of youth re-offending without intervention.
- banned gang patches in public and made gang membership an aggravating factor in sentencing;
- announced an extra $1.9 billion for Corrections to expand prison capacity and hire around 700 more Corrections officers;
- committed to recruiting 500 additional frontline police officers by the end of 2025 (a target the Government has struggled to fully meet on time)
- stopped funding for section 27 cultural reports which Chief Justice Heemi Taumaunu said "provided "the court valuable information about the defendant."
- provided $78 million to extend rehabilitation programs to prisoners on remand.

As the prison population approached 11,000 in November 2025, Luxon publicly endorsed policies which lead to higher prisoner numbers as "a good thing" as it keeps offenders off the streets.

Luxon also defended the boot camp programme, saying the government was "going to try something different because we cannot carry on getting the results that we've been getting."

=== Treaty Principles Bill ===
As part of the coalition agreement with ACT New Zealand, Luxon agreed to support the Treaty Principles Bill at its first reading and send it to a select committee. Luxon made it clear that National would not support the bill beyond that stage or allow it to become law. He has emphasised that the bill does a disservice to the Treaty of Waitangi by oversimplifying 184 years of complex debate and discussion around the Treaty. The bill sparked heated debate in Parliament with MPs describing it as "divisive" and a "wrecking ball" to Crown-Māori relations.

=== Environmental issues ===
In early December 2023, Luxon along with Cyclone Recovery Minister Mark Mitchell and Transport and Local Government Minister Simeon Brown, visited Hawke's Bay to meet with local leaders and local National MPs Katie Nimon and Catherine Wedd to discuss government support for post-flood and Cyclone Gabrielle relief efforts in the region. During the visit, Luxon confirmed that the Government would pause work on restoring the Napier-Wairoa railway line to focus on repairing State Highway 2.

On 11 February 2024, Luxon and Emergency Management and Recovery Minister Mark Mitchell announced that the Government would contribute NZ$63 million to aid the removal of sediment and debris caused by Cyclone Gabrielle in the Hawke's Bay and Gisborne District.

=== Cabinet reshuffles ===
In late April 2024, Luxon stripped Melissa Lee of her Media and Communications ministerial portfolio and Penny Simmonds of her Disability Issues portfolio during a cabinet reshuffle. Lee had faced criticism for her response to Warner Bros. Discovery's closure of Newshub while Simmonds had faced criticism over her handling of changes to disability funding and services. Lee was also relieved of her Cabinet position. Luxon appointed Paul Goldsmith to the Media and Communications portfolio, Louise Upston to the Disability Issues portfolio and promoted Climate Change and Revenue Minister Simon Watts to the Cabinet.

Luxon initiated a second cabinet reshuffle on 19 January 2025. Simeon Brown gained the health portfolio from Shane Reti and also became Minister for State Owned Enterprises. Reti became Minister of Science, Innovation and Technology and also gained the new Universities portfolio. Chris Bishop gained the transportation portfolio while Watts gained the energy and local government portfolios. Lee lost her economic growth and ethnic communities ministerial portfolios to Nicola Willis and Mark Mitchell respectively. James Meager gained the hunting and fishing, youth, and the new South Island portfolios. Matt Doocey lost his ACC, tourism and youth portfolios to Andrew Bayly, Upston and Meager respectively. Chris Penk assumed the small business and manufacturing portfolio. No changes were made to ACT and New Zealand First ministerial portfolios. On 21 February, Bayly resigned from his Commerce and Consumer Affairs and ACC portfolios following allegations of "overbearing" behaviour. National's Senior Whip Scott Simpson assumed those portfolios.

Luxon initiated a third major cabinet reshuffle in early April 2026 to address the planned departures of cabinet ministers Judith Collins and Reti prior to the 2026 New Zealand general election. Penk joined Cabinet, gaining the defence, Government Communications Security Bureau (GCSB), New Zealand Security Intelligence Service (NZSIS) and space portfolios. Penny Simmonds rejoined Cabinet, gaining the tertiary education and science, innovation and technology portfolios. Chris Bishop became Attorney-General but lost the Leader of the House and campaign manager roles to Louise Upston and Simeon Brown respectively. Goldsmith also gained the Public Service, Digitising Government, and Pacific Peoples portfolios.

=== Local governance ===
Luxon and the National Party had pledged to replace the controversial Three Waters reform programme, and after taking office his government introduced Local Water Done Well as its alternative approach to managing water services.

On 5 May 2024, Luxon, Local Government Minister Simeon Brown and Mayor of Auckland Wayne Brown jointly announced that Auckland would avoid a 25.8 percent rates increase as part of the Government's Local Water Done Well plan.

During Local Government New Zealand's annual conference held on 21 August 2024, Luxon called on local and regional councils to focus on rubbish collection, water infrastructure and other local assets. He also criticised so-called "nice to have projects" such as the Tākina convention centre. Luxon also confirmed that Cabinet had agreed to revise the Local Government Act and scrap the four wellbeing provisions in that legislation.

On 23 June 2025, Luxon said he was open to abolishing regional councils as part of the Government's reform of the Resource Management Act 1991.

=== Education ===
In early August 2024, Luxon and Education Minister Erica Stanford announced plans to introduce a new mathematics curriculum from early 2025 with a focus on raising student standards and achievement. In response, the New Zealand Educational Institute expressed concerns that rapid changes to the maths and literacy curriculum and the short teaching training timeframe would strain the teaching workforce without delivering on its goals.

In early August 2025, Luxon and Stanford confirmed that the Government would scrap the National Certificate of Educational Achievement (NCEA) secondary school qualification over the next five years.

=== Abuse survivors ===
On 10 November 2024, Luxon delivered the government's national apology to survivors of abuse in state and faith-based care at Parliament. He also announced that the government was introducing legislation to combat abuse in care, including banning strip searches on children and strengthening security checks for people working with children.

=== Social welfare ===
In 2022, Luxon stated National would make cuts to the Ministry of Social Development.

In August 2024, Luxon and Louise Upston, announced a "traffic light" regime for welfare was introduced, setting out escalating consequences for beneficiaries who fail to meet job-seeking or other obligations. From early 2025, jobseeker beneficiaries are required to reapply for their benefit every six months, instead of annually, and a new community work sanction was introduced requiring beneficiaries to "build skills and confidence."

In October 2025, Luxon and Upston confirmed that the Government would tighten welfare eligibility criteria for 18 and 19-year old teenagers; with those having parents earning over NZ$65,000 being ineligible for Jobseeker and other emergency benefits from November 2026. 18 and 19 year olds, with dependent children, or who were estranged from their parents would still be eligible for welfare assistance. He said:

We're here to help and support as much as we can, but you also have to take responsibility for that and actually just consigning you to a life of welfare for 18 years is unacceptable.

=== Foreign affairs and defence ===
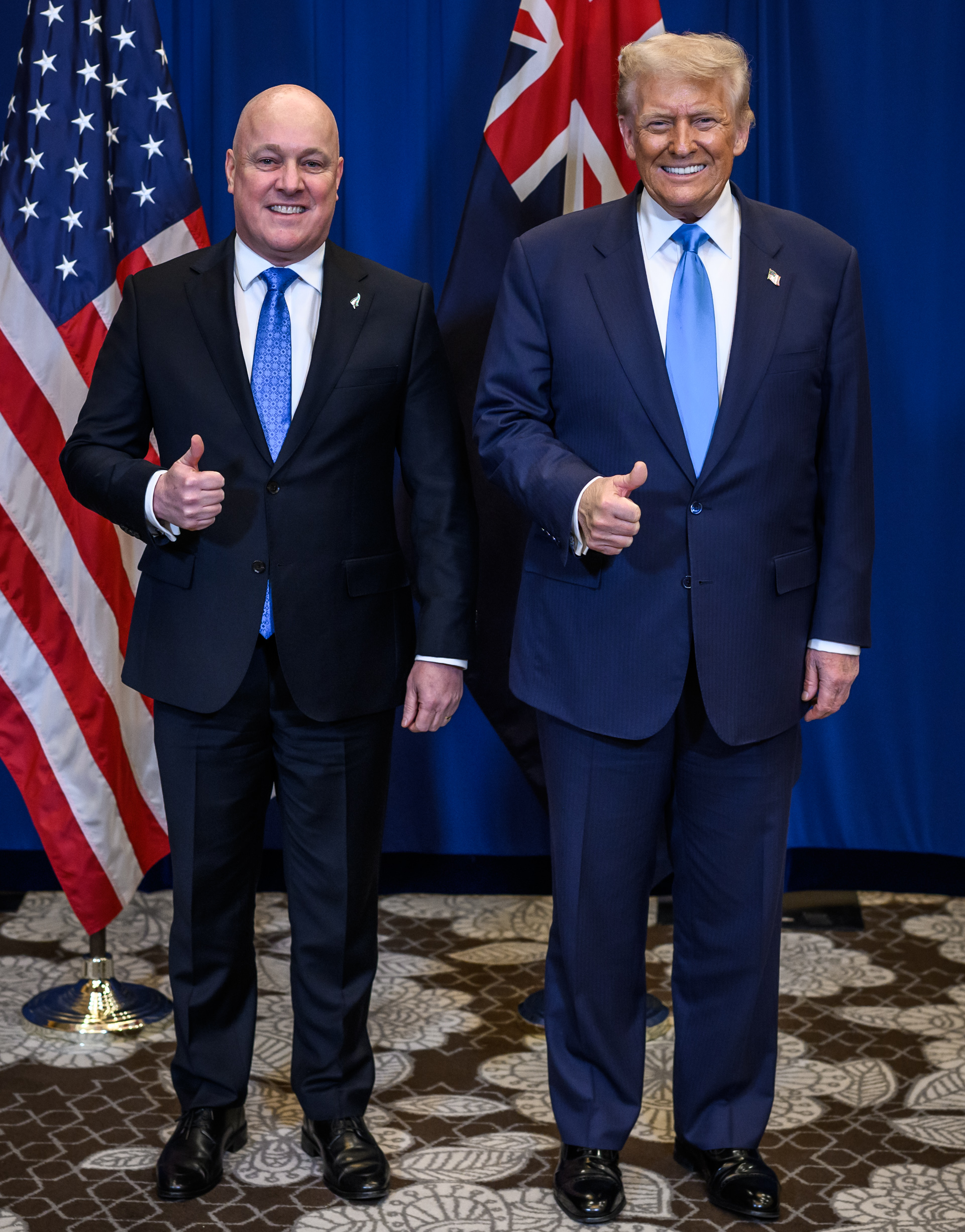
Luxon with American president Donald Trump in South Korea, 29 October 2025

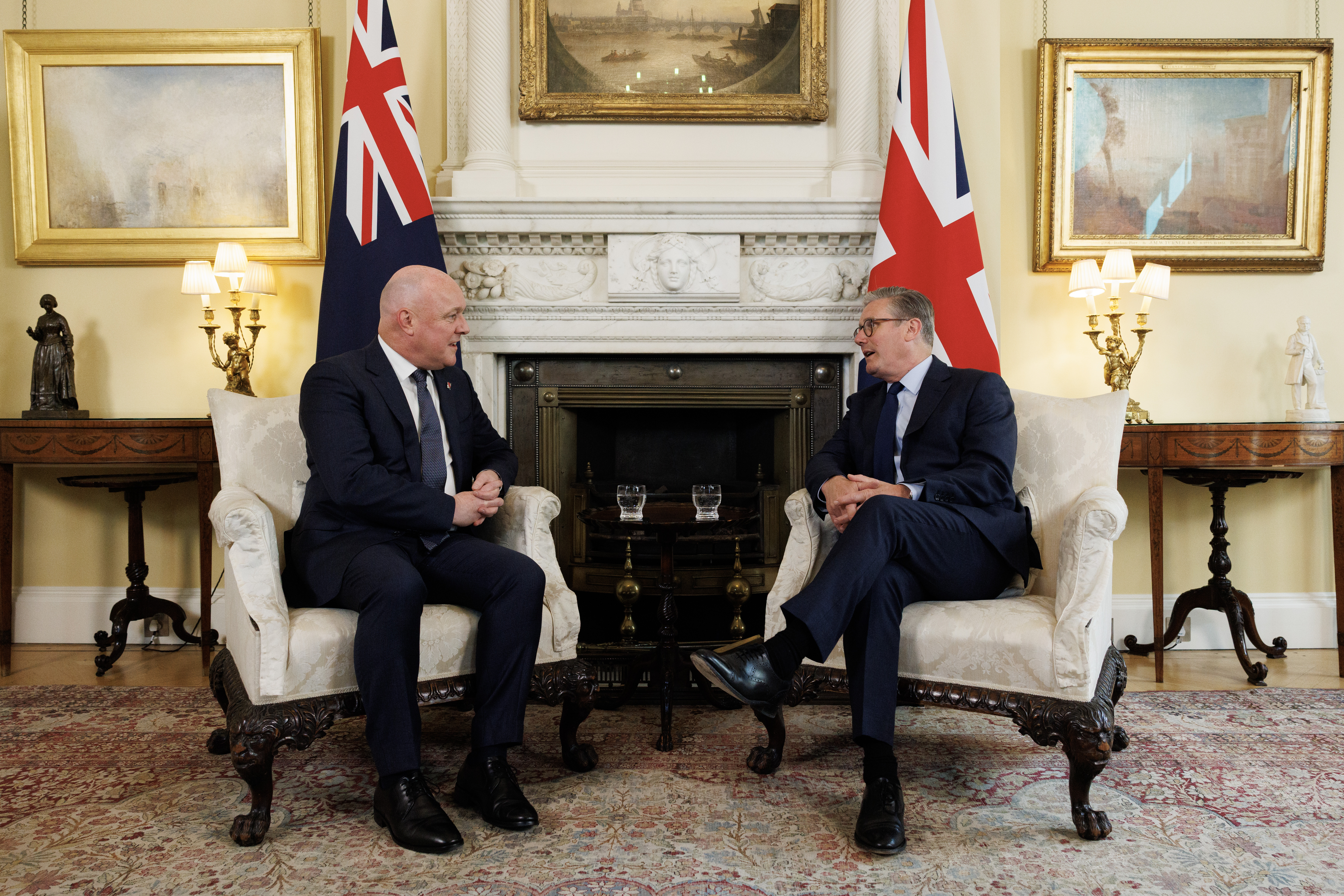
Luxon with British prime minister Keir Starmer in London, 22 April 2025

According to The Economist and Foreign Policy magazine, New Zealand foreign policy under the National-led coalition government shifted away from China in favour of closer relations with its traditional Five Eyes partners, the United States, United Kingdom, Australia and Canada. During an interview with The Economist, Luxon said that he was looking to "diversify New Zealand's diplomatic and trade relationships away from its reliance on China." The magazine described this shift as New Zealand's biggest pivot since the ANZUS dispute in 1986 that was triggered by New Zealand's nuclear-free policy.

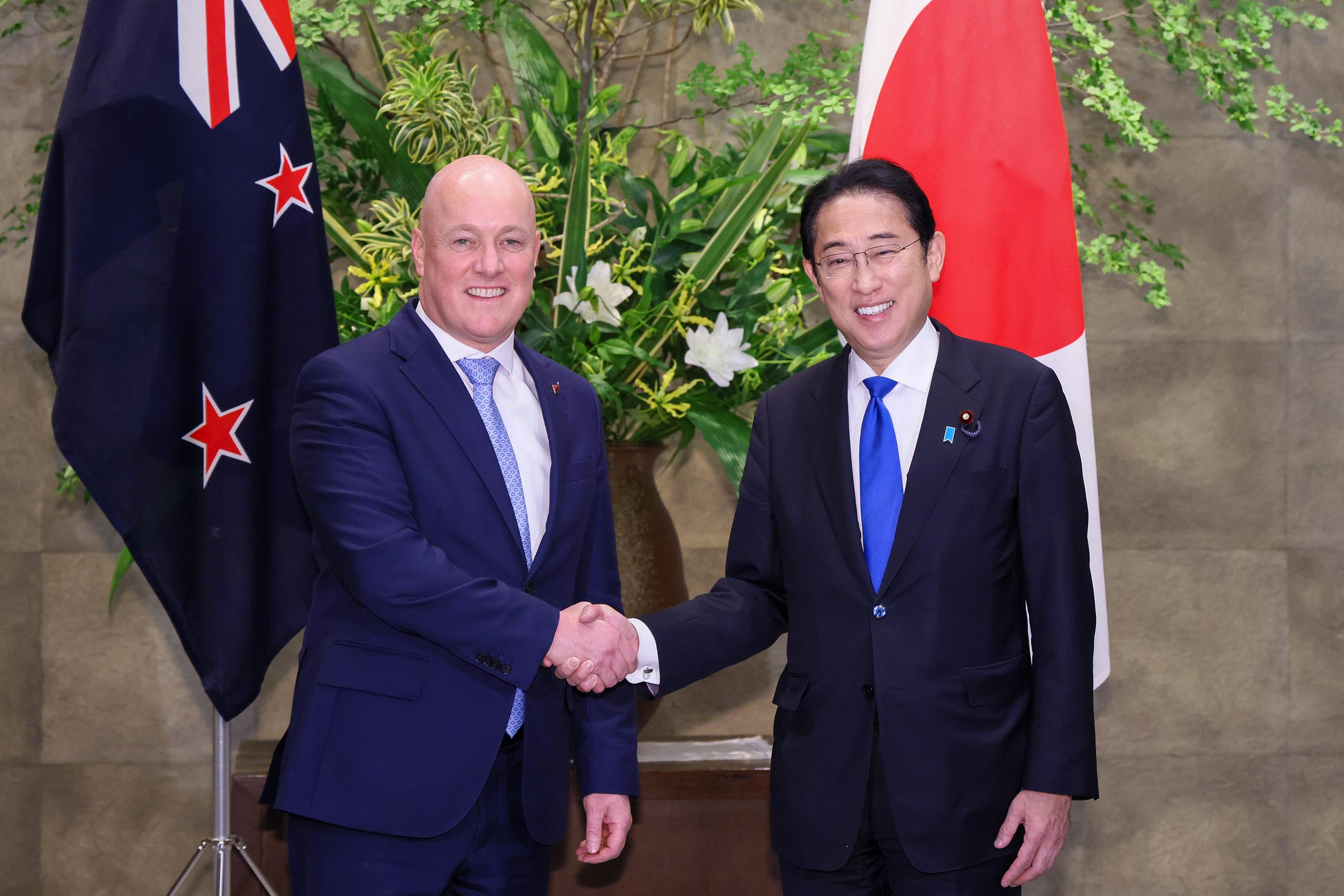
Luxon with Japanese prime minister Fumio Kishida, 19 June 2024

Foreign Policy columnist Derek Grossman wrote that Luxon and Foreign Minister Winston Peters were continuing a thaw in New Zealand–United States relations that began under National prime minister John Key in 2010 and was continued by Labour prime minister Jacinda Ardern and Chris Hipkins. Notable examples of this pro-US shift included the Royal New Zealand Navy sending a ship to sail through the disputed Taiwan Strait and the National-led government's expressed interest in partnering with AUKUS and NATO.

In late August 2024, Luxon expressed support for Taiwan's participation in the Pacific Islands Forum in response to Chinese plans to lobby for member states to exclude Taiwan from attending the Forum's 2025 event.

In April 2025, Luxon announced the Government will allocate $12 billion to defence spending over the next four years. Luxon said it was time New Zealand "pulls its weight" internationally. This will bring New Zealand's spending on defence up to 2% of its GDP, up from 1%.

==== Australia ====
On 20 December 2023, Luxon made his first state visit as head of government to Sydney where he met Australian prime minister Anthony Albanese. During his visit, Luxon affirmed New Zealand's nuclear-free policy but expressed openness to joining the non-nuclear pillar of the AUKUS agreement, but also stated that New Zealand was keen to do its share of "heavy lifting" in the Australia–New Zealand defence relationship. Luxon and Albanese also talked about the contribution of New Zealand Australians to Australia.

Between 9 and 10 August 2025, Luxon hosted Albanese in Queenstown for the annual bilateral head of government talks. They discussed various trade and defence issues, the Gaza war and Australia's 501 deportation policy. Other local and civil society leaders attended the meeting including Mayor of Queenstown-Lakes Glyn Lewers, Southland MP Joseph Mooney, Ngai Tahu Tipene O'Regan and Edward Ellison, and New Zealand actor and film-maker Cliff Curtis. The two leaders laid wreaths at a memorial to fallen ANZAC soldiers in Arrowtown on 10 August.

Luxon has consistently expressed strong opposition to Australia's 501 deportation policy, particularly when it results in people with minimal ties to New Zealand being deported. He has repeatedly called the policy "regrettable" and "not right." He has expressed disappointment that Australia reversed its previous, more lenient approach, which took into account the length of time someone had lived in Australia and their family connections before deporting them. He has stated, "It's just not right that people who have no connection to New Zealand are deported to New Zealand." Following his discussions with Albanese, Luxon said: "We respect the fact that Australia has its own policies around deportation," but hoped that common sense would prevail.

=== Coalition dynamics ===
Luxon's leadership and ability to govern effectively have been challenged by the roles and actions of his coalition partners, David Seymour (ACT) and Winston Peters (NZ First). A recurring concern is his perceived lack of control over his coalition partners. A poll in April 2024 found that 51% of respondents say Luxon is the decision maker in government.

Seymour has openly challenged Luxon's authority, particularly around contentious issues like the Treaty Principles Bill. Seymour has even asserted that Luxon cannot unilaterally sack ACT ministers. Peters has not hesitated to critique government policy or his own coalition's fiscal plans. In March 2024, he undercut finance minister Nicola Willis by claiming a $5.6b fiscal hole would result from her intended tax cuts.

=== National Party leadership ===
Luxon's background as a corporate executive is often cited as influencing his communication style. He has been criticised for using business jargon, such as referring to voters as "customers."

In April 2024, a 1News-Verian poll showed the National–ACT–New Zealand First coalition government convincingly behind the left bloc of Labour, the Green Party and Te Pāti Māori. It also cast doubt on the strength of Luxon's leadership compared to that of his coalition partners Winston Peters and David Seymour, with 51% of respondents believing Luxon was the decision-maker in the government.

A subsequent poll by Talbot Mills suggested a Labour-led government would have a bare majority of 62 seats, while Roy Morgan found 54% of those they surveyed believed New Zealand was heading in "the wrong direction", with just 35% believing it was in the right direction. In June 2024, a poll showed Luxon fall behind opposition leader Chris Hipkins in net favourability for the first time.

Opinion polls showed that Luxon's lack of popularity deepened over his first 18 months in office. His net favourability was notably lower than previous first-term Prime Ministers such as Helen Clark, John Key, and Jacinda Ardern. Six months later, in October 2025, The Post/Freshwater Strategy poll found that 27% of voters viewed Luxon positively, while 51% had an unfavourable view.

Luxon's leadership of the party has repeatedly come under scrutiny. In November 2025, Chris Bishop was named as the prospective instigator of a potential plot to oust Luxon as leader, but the plan never came to fruition. Successive poor polling throughout April 2026 and speculation on his suitability as leader led to Luxon calling a vote of confidence in his leadership at a party caucus meeting on 21 April. The motion passed, reportedly by 27–22. The speculation became prominent again later that year. On 11 August 2026, Luxon abruptly called another vote of confidence in himself for the next day. Minister of Defence Chris Penk emerged as his challenger. Luxon defeated Penk and purged him from cabinet.

=== 2026 general election ===
During the 2026 New Zealand general election, Luxon contested the Botany electorate for National. He was ranked first on the National Party list. On 7 November, Luxon retained Botany for National by a landslide margin of 13,073 votes.

== Political positions ==
My faith is personal to me. It is not in itself a political agenda. I believe no religion should dictate to the State, and no politician should use the political platform they have to force their beliefs on others. As MPs, we serve the common cause of all New Zealanders—not one religion, not one group, not one interest. A person should not be elected because of their faith, nor should they be rejected because of it.

— Luxon's maiden speech, 24 March 2021

Luxon is an evangelical Christian who is recognised as a social conservative. In his maiden parliamentary speech, Luxon defined himself as centre-right and moderate; the government he leads has been described as conservative and right-wing, and one of the most so since the 1990s. Luxon supports low taxes, making cuts to the Ministry of Social Development, establishing military-style boot-camps for young offenders, and introducing stringent anti-gang legislation, and is opposed to welfare dependency and to co-governance with Māori.

In November 2019, Luxon said he was against abortion, euthanasia, and legalising recreational cannabis, though at the same time he supported medicinal use of cannabis. He also at the time supported a "no jab, no pay" policy for sanctioning welfare beneficiaries who did not vaccinate their children; however, following his election as leader of the National Party, Luxon said he did not support cutting the benefits of parents who do not vaccinate their children against COVID-19.

=== Abortion ===
Luxon's views on abortion received media attention following his election as National's leader. He confirmed that his personal views are anti-abortion, but said National will not contest the Abortion Legislation Act 2020 should he become prime minister. After previously declining to answer when asked if he believes abortion to be tantamount to murder, he said in an interview with Newshub that he is "a pro-life person," and when asked again about the murder comparison, he responded "that's what a pro-life position is."

=== Gaza war ===
In response to the Gaza war, Luxon stated that he was shocked and saddened by Hamas's October 7 attacks against Israel. Luxon condemned Hamas' attacks and stated that Israel had a right to defend itself.

He later committed New Zealand to active military support, saying "I want us to be in lockstep with our partners who have common interests and actually be right there with them at that time." In January 2024, he authorised deployment of 6 NZDF personnel to support military action against Houthi forces in the Red Sea, saying "it's about us standing up for things that we believe in, and we can either talk about them or we can actually do something about it as well and make sure that we put real capability alongside our words".

On 30 January 2024, Luxon announced that New Zealand would be suspending its annual NZ$1 million aid to UNRWA (the United Nations Relief and Works Agency for Palestinian Refugees in the Near East) following allegations that several UNRWA workers had participated in the 7 October attacks. His announcement followed a decision by the Ministry of Foreign Affairs and Trade to review New Zealand's aid to UNRWA. On 29 February 2024, Luxon announced New Zealand's designation of Hamas in its entirety as a terrorist entity.

As the war on Gaza unfolded, Luxon's position changed. On 2 December 2024, Luxon confirmed that New Zealand would comply with an International Criminal Court (ICC) arrest warrant in the event that Israeli Prime Minister Benjamin Netanyahu visited New Zealand. During a press conference, he stated, "We believe in the international rules-based system, we support the ICC, and we would be obligated to do so." In June 2025, he described New Zealand's sanctions on Israeli ministers Bezalel Smotrich and Itamar Ben-Gvir as "entirely appropriate".

On 9 August 2025, Luxon and Australian Prime Minister Anthony Albanese called for a ceasefire in Gaza and opposed Israeli plans to occupy Gaza City. On 13 August 2025, Luxon made remarks in Parliament criticising Israel's conduct during the Gaza war, describing it as "utterly, utterly appalling." He also said that "I think Netanyahu has gone way too far. I think he has lost the plot."

=== COVID-19 pandemic ===
Although Luxon frequently criticised the Labour Government's strategy for managing the COVID-19 pandemic, on 8 January 2022, he stated that the National Party strongly supports COVID-19 vaccination, and described vaccination as the best protection for people and their families.

=== Defence and security ===
In response to US president Donald Trump's announcement during the 2025 APEC Summit that the United States would resume nuclear testing, Luxon expressed disapproval of US plans to resume nuclear testing and reiterated his commitment to New Zealand's nuclear-free policy.

=== Extending parliamentary term ===
On 20 September 2024, Luxon said that the coalition government was open to holding a referendum to extend the parliamentary term from three to four years at the 2026 general election. On 27 February 2025, the government introduced the Term of Parliament (Enabling 4-year Term) Legislation Amendment Bill to conduct a referendum.

=== Immigration ===
On 3 May 2023, Luxon acknowledged the historical sensitivity around the dawn raids of the 1970s which disproportionately targeted Pasifika New Zealanders. However, he stated that Immigration New Zealand needed to "reserve the option" to use police raids against individuals involved in serious criminal offending or who posed a security risk to New Zealand. Luxon also stated there were 14,000 overstayers in New Zealand. Luxon's remarks came in response to media coverage of the agency's recent dawn raid tactics against visa overstayers, which had attracted criticism from Deputy Prime Minister Carmel Sepuloni for re-traumatising the Pasifika community.

On 11 December 2023, Luxon stated that New Zealand's 118,000 annual net migration rate was unsustainable and that infrastructure needed to be managed better to support growth. Luxon made these remarks after the Australian Government announced a new migration strategy to address pressure on housing and infrastructure in Australia.

=== Iran ===
Following the 2026 Iran war which began on 28 February 2026, Luxon and Foreign Minister Winston Peters issued a joint statement defending the strikes as a response to Iranian "threats to international peace and security" and called for a resumption of negotiations and adherence to international law. On 3 March 2026, Luxon said he had misspoke when he said that New Zealand had long supported "any actions" to prevent Iran from obtaining nuclear weapons. He subsequently clarified that he meant that New Zealand supported "action" to prevent Iran from acquiring nuclear weapons. Luxon later stated in Parliament that the New Zealand Government would take a "pragmatic approach" to visa holders whose travel plans has been disrupted by the Iran war in response to a question by Greens co-leader Chlöe Swarbrick.

=== Māori issues ===
In late January 2023, Luxon stated that National opposed co-governance in the delivery of public services such as health, education and critical infrastructure. Nevertheless, he expressed support for "self-driven" initiatives within the Māori community such as Whānau Ora, kohanga reo and charter schools. On 25 January, Luxon stated that the existence of Māori seats "doesn't make a lot of sense."

During Waitangi Day on 6 February 2023, Luxon described the Treaty of Waitangi as a "challenging, imperfect but ultimately inspiring document through which New Zealand had sought to understand what was intended by those who signed it." While acknowledging that the New Zealand Crown had not upheld the Treaty's promises and obligations, he expressed hope that the Treaty settlement process would be completed by 2030.

During a Question Time in Parliament on 20 August 2024, Luxon said that he believed that Māori ceded sovereignty to the New Zealand Crown by signing the Treaty of Waitangi. When questioned by Green co-leader Chlöe Swarbrick, Luxon reiterated that the Treaty was New Zealand's founding document and said that it had protected both Māori and Crown interests.

On 19 December 2024, Luxon confirmed that he would not be attending events at the Waitangi Treaty Grounds on 4 February 2025, stating that it was his intention to celebrate Waitangi Day around New Zealand with different iwi. National Waitangi Trust chairperson Pita Tipene expressed disappointment with Luxon's decision while Labour leader Chris Hipkins said that Luxon was "running away from problems of his own creation."

=== Monarchy ===
Luxon has described himself as a "soft republican" and believes that New Zealand will "ultimately" become a republic, but that the change would not happen "in my Government and in my time."

=== School meals ===
On 1 March 2025, Luxon said that the school lunch programme was experiencing "teething issues" in response to quality and delivery issues with the Government's new school lunch programme. He added that Associate Education Minister Seymour "will work his way through those issues... and I expect he will [find a solution]." On 4 March, Luxon stated during a press conference that parents who were dissatisfied with the school lunch programme should "make a marmite sandwich and put an apple in a bag". Luxon's remarks drew criticism from Hora Hora School principal and Tai Tokerau Principals' Association spokesman Pat Newman, Child Poverty Action Group executive officer Sarita Divis, East Otago High School principal Helen Newcombe, who argued that school lunches were needed to improve the health and educational outcomes of students and combat child poverty. In response to criticism, Luxon defended his remarks and reiterated the Government's commitment to addressing problems with the school lunch programme.

=== Sex education ===
While Luxon regards sex education as important to the school curriculum, in February 2024 he stated that it should be age appropriate and that parents should be able to withdraw their children from sex education classes if they choose.

=== LGBTQ issues ===
In late November 2021, Luxon said the practice of conversion therapy was "abhorrent". In early February 2022, he said he supports New Zealand's LGBTQ community and announced that National MPs would be allowed a conscience vote on the Conversion Practices Prohibition Legislation Bill. The Bill passed its third and final reading on 15 February 2022, with Luxon voting in favour of the Bill's passage.

When asked in March 2023 if anti-transgender activist Posie Parker should be allowed to enter New Zealand, Luxon said that he affirmed people's right to free speech but that he "absolutely" supported the rights of New Zealand's transgender community. In mid-August, Luxon said that he believes there is no need for laws specifying which toilets transgender people can use. During a TVNZ debate with Prime Minister Chris Hipkins in September, he said that the participation of transgender people in sports is an issue that should be left to sporting bodies.

== Personal life ==
Luxon met his wife Amanda at a church youth group and they married on 8 January 1994 when he was 23. They have a son and daughter. The couple share the same faith, saying "it quietly guides what they care about".

In late July 2022, Luxon confirmed he was on a family holiday in Hawaii during the parliamentary recess when a Facebook video post published on 21 July implied he was visiting Te Puke at that time. Luxon attributed the confusion to a delay in his social media team updating his whereabouts over the previous week, which he said was a mistake.

Luxon had a Catholic upbringing, but describes himself as a non-denominational Christian. After he returned to New Zealand in 2011 he attended the Upper Room church in Auckland. He now does not go to a regular church, adding that he does not even go to church every Sunday. In his maiden speech in Parliament, he said "My faith is personal to me. It is not in itself a political agenda."

Luxon has said that he has never drunk alcohol. He made that decision at the age of about seven or eight and has cited his grandfather's drinking problems as his reason.

Luxon enjoys DIY, listening to country music, waterskiing and fishing. Luxon is a supporter of the Crusaders rugby union team and Auckland FC in association football. He attended Auckland FC's first ever match in the A-League Men in 2024, where he was pranked by an Auckland FC fan who flicked his nose while posing for a photo.

Luxon has a long-standing friendship with former Prime Minister John Key and used to ask Key questions about the pros and cons of being a prime minister. In 2017, while Luxon was chief executive at Air New Zealand, John Key was appointed as an Air New Zealand director. They both resigned from Air New Zealand in 2019.

== Awards ==
In 2015, Luxon was named the Deloitte Top 200 CEO of the Year for his leadership at Air New Zealand.

In 2019, Luxon won a BLAKE Award for his sustainability initiatives at Air New Zealand.

== See also ==
- List of current heads of state and government
- List of heads of the executive by approval rating

New Zealand Parliament
Preceded by Jami-Lee Ross	Member of Parliament for Botany; 2020–present	Incumbent
Political offices
Preceded by Judith Collins	Leader of the Opposition; 2021–2023	Succeeded by Chris Hipkins
Preceded by Chris Hipkins	Prime Minister of New Zealand; 2023–present	Incumbent
Party political offices
Preceded by Judith Collins	Leader of the National party 2021–present	Incumbent
Business positions
Preceded by Rob Fyfe	Chief executive officer of Air New Zealand; 2013–2019	Succeeded by Greg Foran
Order of precedence
Preceded by Dame Cindy Kiro as Governor-General	Order of Precedence of New Zealand as Prime Minister	Succeeded by Gerry Brownlee as Speaker of the House of Representatives
