= Law Association of New Zealand =

- Type: Bar association
- Region served: Auckland
- President: Tony Herring

The Law Association of New Zealand Auckland is a New Zealand incorporated society. It is a professional body that advocates for barristers and solicitors. It operates in conjunction with the New Zealand Law Society and was established in 1879. Membership was compulsory in accordance with the Law Practitioners Act 1982, until c.2008.

It used to be known as the Auckland District Law Society, before being renamed in 2023.
