= Leader of the New Zealand National Party =

Most-senior elected politician in the party

Leader of the National Party
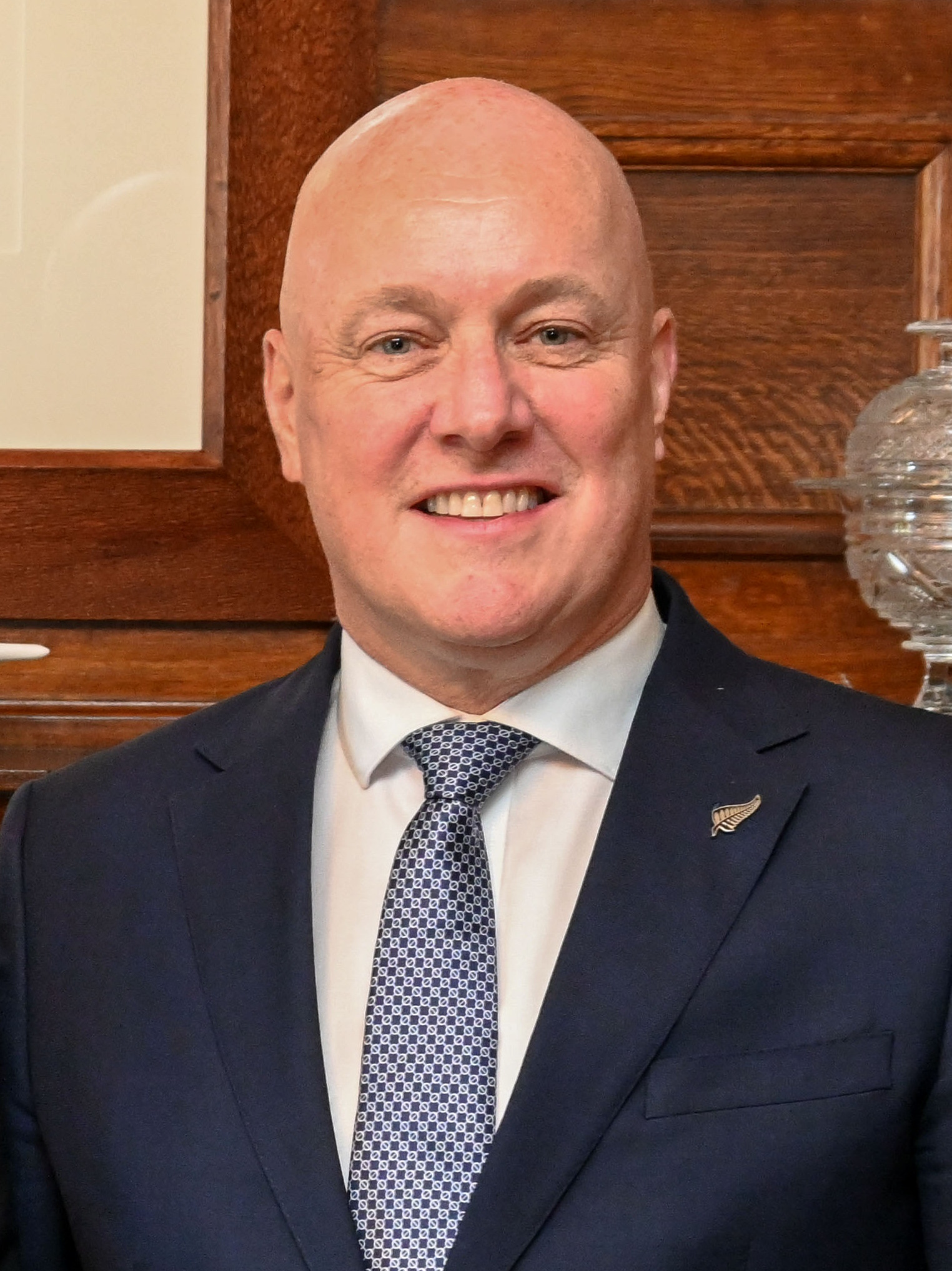
- Incumbent; Christopher Luxon since 30 November 2021
- Member of: New Zealand House of Representatives
- Term length: No fixed term
- Inaugural holder: Adam Hamilton
- Formation: 2 November 1936
- Deputy: Nicola Willis

The leader of the National Party is the most-senior elected politician within the New Zealand National Party. Under the constitution of the party, they are required to be a member of the House of Representatives.

The National Party has found itself either in government (alone or with the support of other parties) or in opposition to Labour-led governments. Consequently, the leader of the National Party usually assumes the role of either the prime minister or leader of the Opposition.

The current leader of the National Party since 30 November 2021 is Christopher Luxon.

== Selection ==
Following a general election, or when a vacancy arises, the Parliamentary Section of the National Party (also called the Caucus) elects a leader of the Parliamentary Section (that is, the parliamentary leader). After receiving approval by the Board of Directors (the governing body of the party), the leader of the Parliamentary Section becomes the leader of the party.

== Role ==
The leader organises the business of the party in Parliament and represents the party to the general public. Within the party organisation, they must ensure political consensus; the constitution of the National Party states that the leader has "the right to attend any Party meeting or committee meeting and shall be an ex officio member of the Board".

The leader becomes the National Party's candidate for prime minister in the run-up to an election, and they invariably take office as prime minister when the National Party forms a government. In 1949, party leader Sidney Holland became the first prime minister from the National Party.

== List of leaders ==
Of the fifteen people to officially hold the leadership, nine have served as prime minister.

Key:
National Labour
PM: Prime Minister
LO: Leader of the Opposition

No.	Leader	Portrait	Electorate	Term start	Term end	Time in office	Position	Prime Minister
1	Adam Hamilton (1880–1952)		Wallace	2 November 1936	26 November 1940	4 years, 24 days	LO 1936–1940	Savage 1935–40
1	Adam Hamilton (1880–1952)		Wallace	2 November 1936	26 November 1940	4 years, 24 days	LO 1936–1940	Fraser 1940–49
2	Sidney Holland (1893–1961)		Fendalton	26 November 1940	20 September 1957	16 years, 298 days	LO 1940–1949	Fraser 1940–49
2	Sidney Holland (1893–1961)		Fendalton	26 November 1940	20 September 1957	16 years, 298 days	PM 1949–1957	himself
3	Keith Holyoake (1904–1983)		Pahiatua	20 September 1957	7 February 1972	14 years, 140 days	PM 1957	himself
3	Keith Holyoake (1904–1983)		Pahiatua	20 September 1957	7 February 1972	14 years, 140 days	LO 1957–1960	Nash
3	Keith Holyoake (1904–1983)		Pahiatua	20 September 1957	7 February 1972	14 years, 140 days	PM 1960–1972	himself
4	Jack Marshall (1912–1988)		Karori	7 February 1972	4 July 1974	2 years, 147 days	PM 1972	himself
4	Jack Marshall (1912–1988)		Karori	7 February 1972	4 July 1974	2 years, 147 days	LO 1972–1974	Kirk 1972–74
5	Robert Muldoon (1921–1992)		Tamaki	4 July 1974	29 November 1984	10 years, 148 days	LO 1974–1975	Kirk 1972–74
5	Robert Muldoon (1921–1992)		Tamaki	4 July 1974	29 November 1984	10 years, 148 days	LO 1974–1975	Rowling 1974–75
5	Robert Muldoon (1921–1992)		Tamaki	4 July 1974	29 November 1984	10 years, 148 days	PM 1975–1984	himself
5	Robert Muldoon (1921–1992)		Tamaki	4 July 1974	29 November 1984	10 years, 148 days	LO 1984	Lange 1984–89
6	Jim McLay (born 1945)		Birkenhead	29 November 1984	26 March 1986	1 year, 117 days	LO 1984–1986	Lange 1984–89
7	Jim Bolger (1935–2025)		King Country (1972–96); Taranaki-King Country (1996–98)	26 March 1986	8 December 1997	11 years, 257 days	LO 1986–1990	Lange 1984–89
7	Jim Bolger (1935–2025)		King Country (1972–96); Taranaki-King Country (1996–98)	26 March 1986	8 December 1997	11 years, 257 days	LO 1986–1990	Palmer 1989–90
7	Jim Bolger (1935–2025)		King Country (1972–96); Taranaki-King Country (1996–98)	26 March 1986	8 December 1997	11 years, 257 days	LO 1986–1990	Moore 1990
7	Jim Bolger (1935–2025)		King Country (1972–96); Taranaki-King Country (1996–98)	26 March 1986	8 December 1997	11 years, 257 days	PM 1990–1997	himself
8	Jenny Shipley (born 1952)		Rakaia	8 December 1997	8 October 2001	3 years, 304 days	PM 1997–1999	herself
8	Jenny Shipley (born 1952)		Rakaia	8 December 1997	8 October 2001	3 years, 304 days	LO 1999–2001	Clark
9	Bill English (born 1961)		Clutha-Southland	8 October 2001	28 October 2003	2 years, 20 days	LO 2001–2003	Clark
10	Don Brash (born 1940)		List MP	28 October 2003	27 November 2006	3 years, 30 days	LO 2003–2006	Clark
11	John Key (born 1961)		Helensville	27 November 2006	12 December 2016	10 years, 15 days	LO 2006–2008	Clark
11	John Key (born 1961)		Helensville	27 November 2006	12 December 2016	10 years, 15 days	PM 2008–2016	himself
(9)	Bill English (born 1961)		List MP	12 December 2016	27 February 2018	1 year, 77 days	PM 2016–2017	himself
(9)	Bill English (born 1961)		List MP	12 December 2016	27 February 2018	1 year, 77 days	LO 2017–2018	Ardern 2017–23
12	Simon Bridges (born 1976)		Tauranga	27 February 2018	22 May 2020	2 years, 85 days	LO 2018–2020	Ardern 2017–23
13	Todd Muller (born 1968)		Bay of Plenty	22 May 2020	14 July 2020	53 days	LO 2020	Ardern 2017–23
—	Nikki Kaye (Note: Deputy leader who assumed the role of party leader temporarily because of the resignation or removal of the incumbent leader, serving until a following leadership election.) (1980–2024)		Auckland Central	14 July 2020		<1 day	Acting LO 2020	Ardern 2017–23
14	Judith Collins (born 1959)		Papakura	14 July 2020	25 November 2021	1 year, 134 days	LO 2020–2021	Ardern 2017–23
—	Shane Reti (born 1963)		List MP	25 November 2021	30 November 2021	5 days	Acting LO 2021	Ardern 2017–23
15	Christopher Luxon (born 1970)		Botany	30 November 2021	Incumbent	4 years, 339 days	LO 2021–2023	Ardern 2017–23
15	Christopher Luxon (born 1970)		Botany	30 November 2021	Incumbent	4 years, 339 days	LO 2021–2023	Hipkins 2023
15	Christopher Luxon (born 1970)		Botany	30 November 2021	Incumbent	4 years, 339 days	PM 2023–present	himself

== See also ==
- Deputy leader of the New Zealand National Party
- Leader of the New Zealand Labour Party
- List of political parties in New Zealand
