= New Zealand Government =

Executive government of New Zealand

- Māori: Te Kāwanatanga o Aotearoa
- Central government

Overview
- Established: 30 June 1852; 174 years ago
- Country: New Zealand
- Leader: Prime Minister Christopher Luxon
- Appointed by: Governor-General; Cindy Kiro
- Main organ: Executive Council (de jure); Cabinet (de facto)
- Ministries: 32 ministries and departments
- Responsible to: House of Representatives
- Annual budget: NZ$119.3 billion (2018–19)
- Headquarters: The Beehive and other locations across Wellington
- Website: www.govt.nz; beehive.govt.nz

The New Zealand Government (Māori: Te Kāwanatanga o Aotearoa) is the central government through which political authority is exercised in New Zealand. As in most other parliamentary democracies, the term "Government" refers chiefly to the executive branch, and more specifically to the collective ministry directing the executive. Based on the principle of responsible government, it operates within the framework that "the [King] reigns, but the government rules, so long as it has the support of the House of Representatives". The Cabinet Manual describes the main laws, rules and conventions affecting the conduct and operation of the Government.

Executive power is exercised by ministers, all of whom are sworn into the Executive Council and accountable to the elected legislature, the House of Representatives. Several senior ministers (usually 20) constitute a collective decision-making body known as the Cabinet, which is led by the prime minister (currently Christopher Luxon). A few more ministers (usually junior or supporting) are part of the Executive Council but are outside Cabinet. Most ministers have a portfolio of specific responsibilities such as departments or policy areas, although ministers without portfolio can be appointed.

The position of prime minister belongs to the person who commands the confidence of the majority of members in the House of Representatives. The position is determined also by several other factors, such as support agreements between parties and internal leadership votes in the party that leads the Government. The prime minister and other ministers are formally appointed by the governor-general (who is the King's personal representative in New Zealand). By convention, the governor-general acts on the advice of the prime minister in appointing ministers.

== Terminology ==
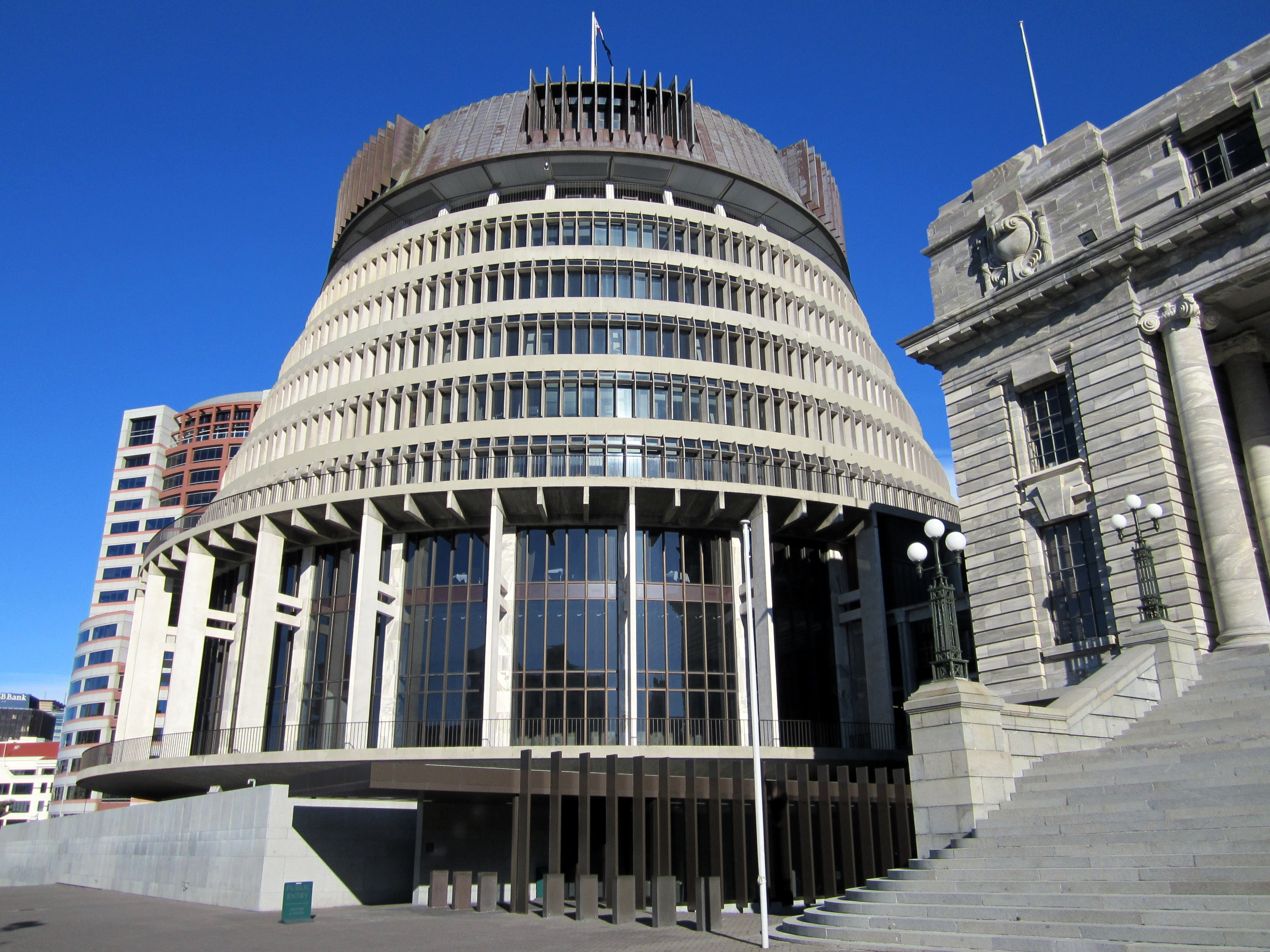
The Beehive, Wellington, is the seat of government (i.e. headquarters of the executive branch).

In New Zealand, the term Government can have a number of different meanings. At its widest, it can refer collectively to the three traditional branches of government—namely, the executive branch, legislative branch (the King-in-Parliament and House of Representatives) and judicial branch (the Supreme Court and subordinate courts). Each branch operates independently of the others in an arrangement described as "separation of powers".

More commonly, the term is used to refer specifically to the executive branch. The largest party or coalition in the House of Representatives, with a sufficient number of MPs to win crucial parliamentary votes, will form a Cabinet—this is the sense intended when it is said that a political party "forms the government". The Constitution Act 1986, the principal part of New Zealand's constitution, locates the executive government in the Executive Council, which also includes ministers outside Cabinet.

The Executive Wing of Parliament Buildings, commonly called the "Beehive" because of the building's shape, houses many government offices and is also where the Cabinet meets. Thus the name Beehive is sometimes used metonymically to refer to the New Zealand Government. The official website of the New Zealand Government uses the web address beehive.govt.nz.

== History ==
The first constitution act was the New Zealand Constitution Act 1846, though Governor George Grey was opposed to its implementation, specifically the proposed division of the country into European and Māori districts, and stated that settlers were not ready for self-government. As a result, almost all of the act was suspended pending the new New Zealand Constitution Act 1852. New Zealand was at this time being governed as a Crown colony. Prior to the act, the basic document setting out the governance of New Zealand since the signing of the Treaty of Waitangi was the Charter for Erecting the Colony of New Zealand of 1840.

New Zealand was granted colonial self-government in 1853 following the New Zealand Constitution Act 1852, which was an act of the Parliament of the United Kingdom. Governments were set up at both central and provincial level, with initially six provinces. The provinces were abolished by the Abolition of Provinces Act 1876, during the premiership of Harry Atkinson. For the purposes of the law, the provinces formally ceased to exist on 1 January 1877.

The Sewell Ministry constituted the first responsible government, with control over all domestic matters other than native policy. Formed in 1856, it lasted from 18 April to 20 May. From 7 May onward, Henry Sewell was titled "colonial secretary", and is generally regarded as having been the country's first prime minister. The first ministry that formed along party lines did not appear until 1891, when John Ballance formed the Liberal Party and the Liberal Government. The prime minister became the leader and public face of the governing party. The status of the monarch's representative was upgraded from "governor" to "governor-general" in 1917 letters patent.

=== List of successive governments ===
In short, there have been three distinctly different periods of New Zealand government—firstly, the period before responsible government; second, from 1856 to 1890, the period in which responsible government begins; and the third period starting with the formation of political parties in 1891.

By convention, a distinct government is named after the largest party that leads it.

== The role of the king and the governor-general ==
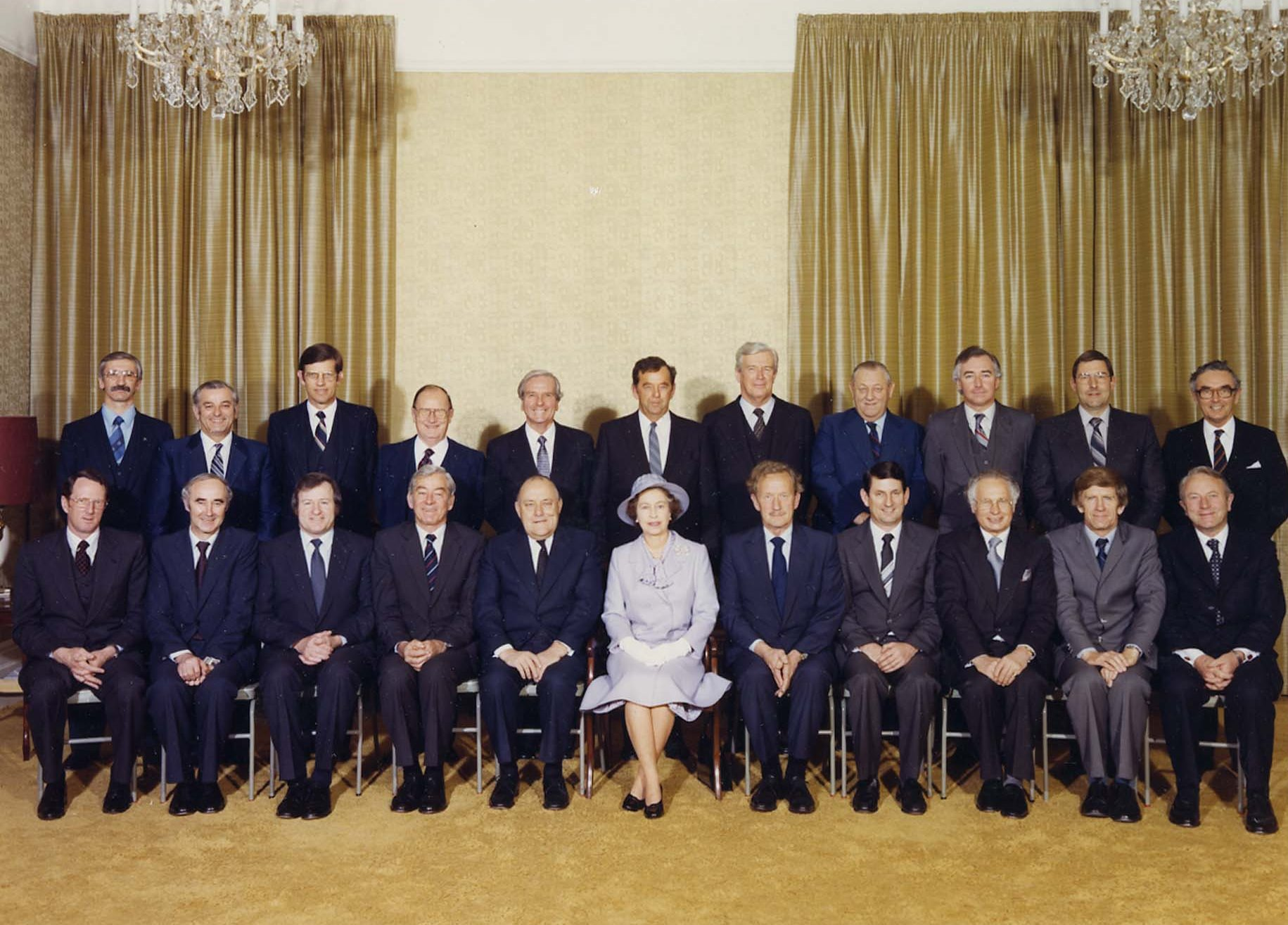
Queen Elizabeth II and her New Zealand Cabinet, photographed during the Queen's 1981 tour of the country. The prime minister during that time was Robert Muldoon, on her right.

The New Zealand Government is formally styled [His] Majesty's Government in the Seal of New Zealand Act 1977. This is a reference to the monarch, King Charles III, who is the head of state under the Constitution Act 1986. The legal authority of the state that is vested in the monarch, known as "the Crown", which is the source of the executive power exercised by the Government. Sovereignty in New Zealand has never rested solely with the monarch due to the English Bill of Rights 1689, later inherited by New Zealand, which establishes the principle of parliamentary sovereignty. Nonetheless, the Constitution Act describes the monarch as the "Sovereign".

In many areas, the Crown possesses a body of powers known as the royal prerogative. For example, the Royal Assent (the monarch's approval) is required to enact laws and the royal sign-manual gives authority to letters patent and orders in council. The royal prerogative also includes summoning and dissolving the Parliament in order to call an election, and extends to foreign affairs: the negotiation and ratification of treaties, alliances, international agreements, the right to declare war and peace, and the deployment and armament of defence forces.

The king rarely personally exercises his executive powers; since the sovereign does not normally reside in New Zealand, he appoints a governor-general to represent him and exercise most of his powers. The person who fills this role is selected on the advice of the prime minister. "Advice" in this sense is a choice without options since it would be highly unconventional for the prime minister's advice to be ignored—a convention that protects the monarchy. As long as the monarch is following the advice of his ministers, he is not held personally responsible for the decisions of the Government. The governor-general has no official term limit, and is said to serve "at His Majesty's pleasure".

As per the conventional stipulations of constitutional monarchy, the king and his representative rarely intervene directly in political affairs. Just as the sovereign's choice of governor-general is on the prime minister's advice, the governor-general exercises the executive powers of state on the advice of ministers. For example, the governor-general's power to withhold the Royal Assent to bills of parliament has been rendered ineffective by the convention.

== Government in Parliament ==
Chart showing the relationship between the executive Government and the Parliament. All ministers are MPs.

Under the conventions of the Westminster system, the Government is accountable to the House of Representatives, the democratically elected component of Parliament, rather than to the sovereign. This is called responsible government. For example, ministers are required to be members of the House, and they make statements and take questions from other members in the House. The Government is required by convention and for practical reasons to maintain the support, or confidence, of the House of Representatives. It also requires the support of the House for the maintenance of supply (by voting through the government's budgets) and in order to pass primary legislation. By convention, if a government loses the confidence of the House then it must either resign or call for a general election. Not since 1928 has a government been defeated on a confidence vote and therefore been obliged to resign.

The Constitution Act 1986 stipulates that general elections must be held at least every three years, making this the maximum period of time that a government can serve without seeking renewal of its mandate. Upon the dissolution of Parliament (preceding a general election) ministers are no longer members of the House of Representatives; however, they can remain members of the Executive Council "until the expiration of the 28th day after the day on which that person ceases to be a member of Parliament".

== Ministers ==
Also known as "ministers of the Crown", these are members of Parliament who hold ministerial warrants from the Crown to perform certain functions of government. This includes formulating and implementing policies and advising the governor-general. Before 1996 nearly all ministers were members of the Cabinet, but since the introduction of proportional representation, which has led to complex governing arrangements, there are currently three categories of minister: ministers in Cabinet, ministers outside Cabinet, and ministers from supporting parties.

=== Executive Council ===
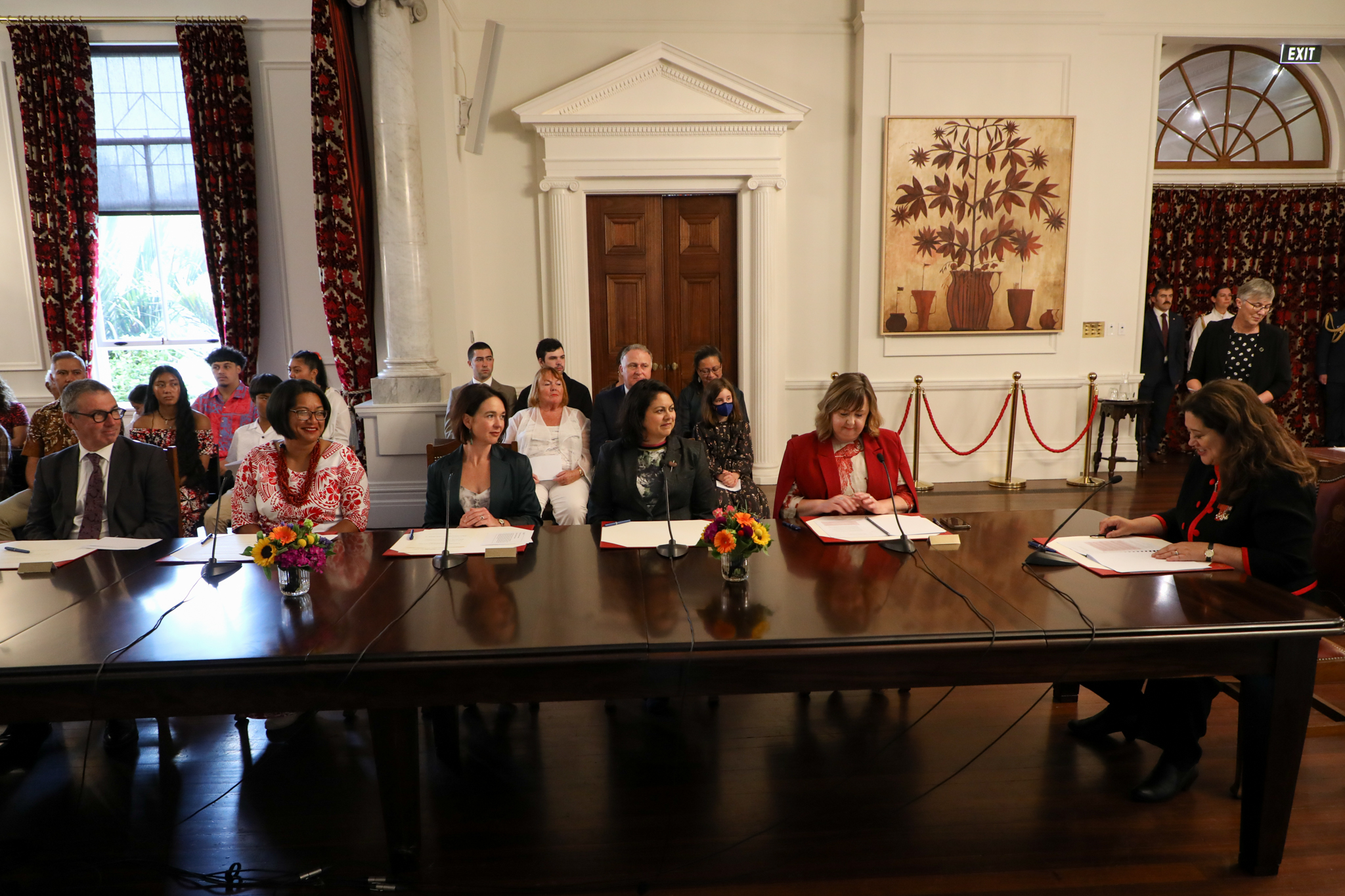
Governor-General Dame Cindy Kiro appoints new ministers during a public meeting of the Executive Council in Government House, Wellington, 1 February 2023.

The Executive Council, established under the Letters Patent 1983, is a formal body that meets to give legal effect to decisions made by the Cabinet, and to carry out various other functions, such as the making of certain appointments to government agencies and boards. The Executive Council's primary function is to issue Orders in Council, which are legally binding regulations made by the Government.

All ministers are members of the Executive Council, and are styled "The Honourable" while in office (or for life if the prime minister recommends it), except for the prime minister, who is entitled to be styled "The Right Honourable" for life. Although not a member of the Executive Council, the governor-general usually presides at Council meetings.

=== Cabinet ===
Cabinet (Māori: Te Rūnanga) is the senior decision-making body of the Government. Constitutional law, such as the Constitution Act 1986, does not recognise the Cabinet as a legal entity; it exists solely by constitutional convention. Its decisions do not in and of themselves have legal force; however, it serves as the practical expression of the Executive Council, which is New Zealand's highest formal governmental body.

The prime minister is responsible for chairing meetings of Cabinet. The governor-general will appoint as prime minister the person most likely to receive the confidence of the House of Representatives to lead the Government. In practice, the appointment is determined by size of each political party, support agreements between parties, and leadership votes in the party that leads the Government. The prime minister then advises the governor-general to appoint other ministers. Each minister is responsible for the general administration of at least one portfolio, and heads a corresponding public service department. The most important minister, following the prime minister, is the finance minister, while other high-profile portfolios include foreign affairs, justice, health and education.

Traditionally, all members are collectively responsible for the actions taken by Cabinet—typically all Cabinet ministers must publicly support the decisions of Cabinet. However, since the introduction of the mixed-member proportional (MMP) electoral system in 1993, processes were developed to allow different parties within a coalition cabinet to "agree to disagree" on some issues.

The legislative agenda of Parliament is determined by the Cabinet. At the start of each new parliamentary term, the governor-general gives an address prepared by the Cabinet that outlines the Government's policy and legislative proposals.

=== Ministers outside Cabinet ===
A few other ministers serve in the Executive Council but outside of Cabinet. Since the introduction of MMP, governments have been formed following agreements between a major party and smaller support parties. In such arrangements, government ministers from the support parties are often ministers outside Cabinet. Non-Cabinet ministers may also be from the major governing party, as has been the case in recent governments. Ministers outside the Cabinet have the same overall duties and responsibilities as their senior colleagues inside Cabinet.

== Current composition ==
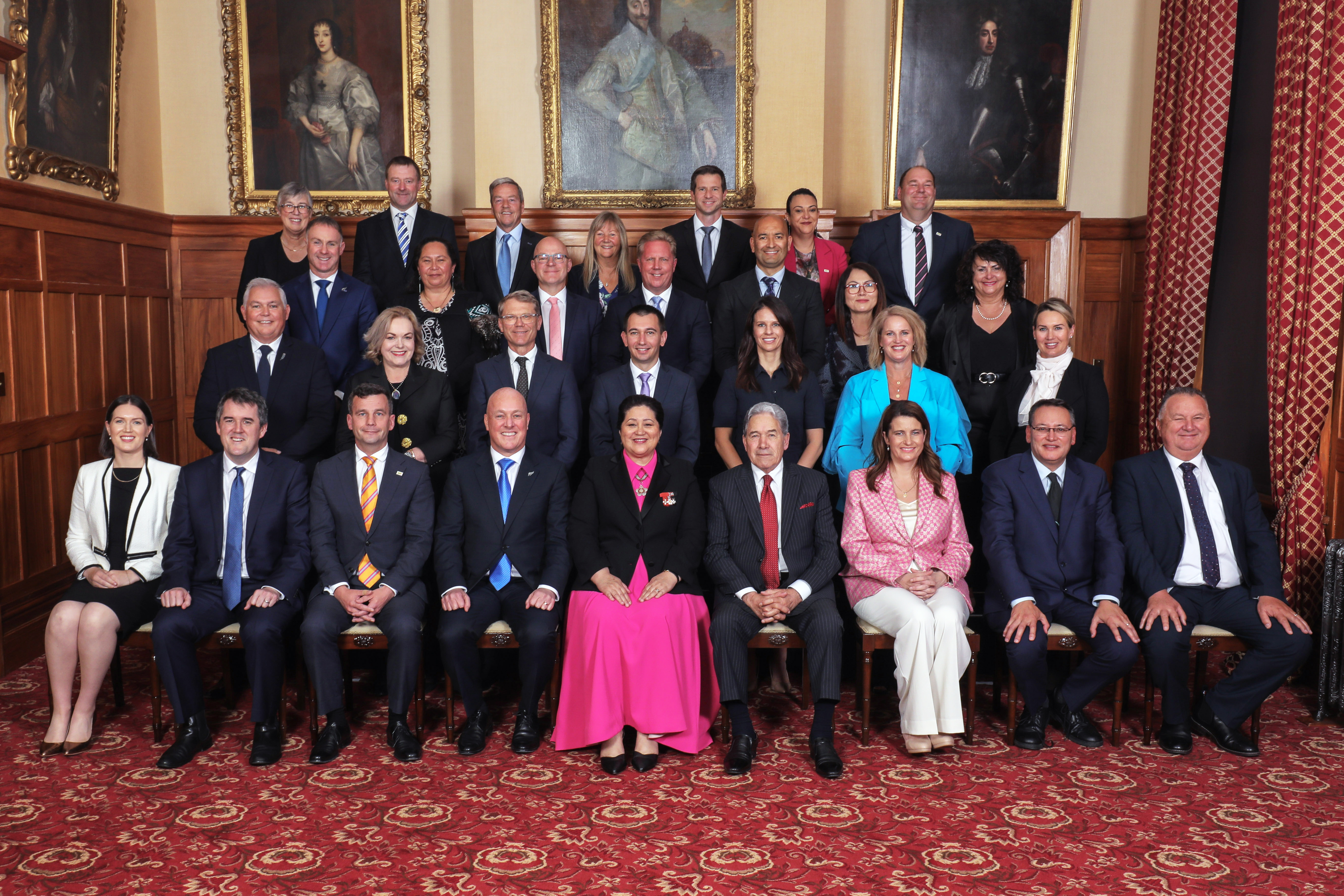
The ministers of the Sixth National Government, with Governor-General Dame Cindy Kiro, 27 November 2023

The current ministry, since November 2023, is the National Party government led by Prime Minister Christopher Luxon, forming a coalition with ACT New Zealand and New Zealand First.

=== List of ministers ===
The table below lists all ministers, as of 13 August 2026.

Parties
National
NZ First
ACT

Portfolios	Image	Incumbent	Additional responsibilities	Electorate
Cabinet Ministers
National Party ministers
Prime Minister; Minister for National Security and Intelligence		Christopher Luxon	Minister Responsible for Ministerial Services	Botany
Minister of Finance; Minister for Economic Growth; Minister for Social Investment		Nicola Willis		List
Attorney-General; Minister of Housing; Minister for Infrastructure; Minister Responsible for RMA Reform; Minister of Transport		Chris Bishop	Associate Minister of Finance	Hutt South
Minister of Health; Minister for Energy; Minister for State Owned Enterprises		Simeon Brown		Pakuranga
Minister of Education; Minister for Immigration		Erica Stanford	Lead Coordination Minister for the Government's Response to the Royal Commission's Report into Historical Abuse in State Care and in the Care of Faith-based Institutions	East Coast Bays
Minister for Arts, Culture and Heritage; Minister of Defence; Minister Responsible for the GCSB and NZSIS; Minister of Justice; Minister for Media and Communications; Minister for Treaty of Waitangi Negotiations; Minister for Pacific Peoples; Minister for the Public Service and Digitising Government; Minister for Space; Minister for Veterans		Paul Goldsmith		List
Minister for the Community and Voluntary Sector; Minister for Disability Issues; Minister for Social Development and Employment; Minister of Tourism and Hospitality		Louise Upston	Minister for Child Poverty Reduction; Leader of the House	Taupō
Minister of Corrections; Minister for Emergency Management and Recovery; Minister for Ethnic Communities; Minister of Police; Minister for Sport and Recreation	Mark Mitchell	Mark Mitchell	Associate Minister for National Security and Intelligence	Whangaparāoa
Minister of Agriculture; Minister of Forestry; Minister for Trade	Todd McClay	Todd McClay	Associate Minister of Foreign Affairs	Rotorua
Minister of Conservation; Minister for Māori Crown Relations: Te Arawhiti; Minister for Māori Development; Minister for Whānau Ora	Tama Potaka	Tama Potaka	Associate Minister of Housing (Social Housing)	Hamilton West
Minister for Mental Health		Matt Doocey	Associate Minister of Health	Waimakariri
Minister for Building and Construction; Minister of Climate Change; Minister of Local Government; Minister of Revenue		Simon Watts	Minister for Auckland	North Shore
Minister for Tertiary Education; Minister of Science, Innovation and Technology		Penny Simmonds	Associate Minister for Social Development and Employment	Invercargill
ACT ministers
Deputy Prime Minister; Minister for Regulation		David Seymour	Associate Minister of Education (Partnership Schools); Associate Minister of Finance; Associate Minister of Health (Pharmac); Associate Minister of Justice (Treaty Principles Bill)	Epsom
Minister of Internal Affairs; Minister for Workplace Relations and Safety		Brooke van Velden		Tāmaki
Minister for Courts		Nicole McKee	Associate Minister of Justice (Firearms)	List
New Zealand First ministers
Minister of Foreign Affairs; Minister for Racing; Minister for Rail		Winston Peters		List
Minister for Oceans and Fisheries; Minister for Regional Development; Minister for Resources		Shane Jones	Associate Minister of Finance; Associate Minister for Energy	List
Minister of Customs; Minister for Seniors		Casey Costello	Associate Minister of Health; Associate Minister for Immigration; Associate Minister for Police	List
Ministers outside Cabinet (Note: Only members regularly attend Cabinet meetings, although ministers outside Cabinet and support party ministers can be invited to attend if an area of their portfolio is on the agenda. Thus all ministers listed below have a role in Cabinet's decision-making.)
Minister of State for Trade; Minister for the Environment; Minister for Women		Nicola Grigg	Associate Minister for ACC	Selwyn
Minister for Hunting and Fishing; Minister for Youth		James Meager	Minister for the South Island; Associate Minister of Transport	Rangitata
Minister for ACC; Minister of Statistics		Scott Simpson	Deputy Leader of the House	Coromandel
Minister of Commerce and Consumer Affairs; Minister for Small Business and Manufacturing		Cameron Brewer	Associate Minister of Immigration	Upper Harbour
Minister for Land Information		Mike Butterick	Associate Minister of Agriculture	Upper Harbour
Minister for Biosecurity; Minister for Food Safety		Andrew Hoggard	Associate Minister of Agriculture (Animal Welfare, Skills); Associate Minister for the Environment	List
Minister for Children; Minister for the Prevention of Family and Sexual Violence		Karen Chhour		List
Minister for Rural Communities		Mark Patterson	Associate Minister of Agriculture; Associate Minister for Regional Development	List
Parliamentary under-secretaries
Parliamentary Under-Secretary to the Minister for Infrastructure and Minister for RMA Reform		Simon Court		List
Parliamentary Under-Secretary to the Minister for Media and Communications and Minister for Oceans and Fisheries		Jenny Marcroft		List

== Departments and other public sector organisations ==
New Zealand's public service includes 32 core government institutions—most have ministry or department in their name, e.g. Ministry for Culture and Heritage, or Department of Internal Affairs—which are listed in the first schedule to the State Sector Act 1988. Staffed by around 45,000 public servants, they provide the government of the day with advice and deliver services to the public. Since the 1980s, the public service has been marketised. Each department is headed by a chief executive who answers to a government minister for that department's performance. In turn, a minister bears the ultimate responsibility for the actions of their department, being answerable to the House of Representatives. This principle is called individual ministerial responsibility.

The wider state sector also includes about 2,800 Crown entities (including some 2,600 school boards of trustees), 17 state-owned enterprises, three officers of Parliament, and the Reserve Bank of New Zealand.

== Relationship with local government ==
There are two main tiers of elected local authorities—regional councils and territorial authorities—in some places merged into unitary authorities. While the central government deals with issues relevant to New Zealand and its people as a nation, local government exists "to enable democratic local decision-making and action by, and on behalf of, communities", and "to meet the current and future needs of communities for good-quality local infrastructure, local public services, and performance of regulatory functions in a way that is most cost-effective for households and businesses."

== See also ==
- Kāwanatanga, a Māori word for "governorship", appearing in the Treaty of Waitangi
- Politics of New Zealand, for a description of other jurisdictions, politics and political institutions
  - Political history of New Zealand
- New Zealand Gazette, the official Government newspaper
- New Zealand order of precedence
- Department of the Prime Minister and Cabinet (New Zealand)
- Official Opposition (New Zealand)
