= Chris Penk =

New Zealand politician (born 1979)

The Honourable Chris Penk MP
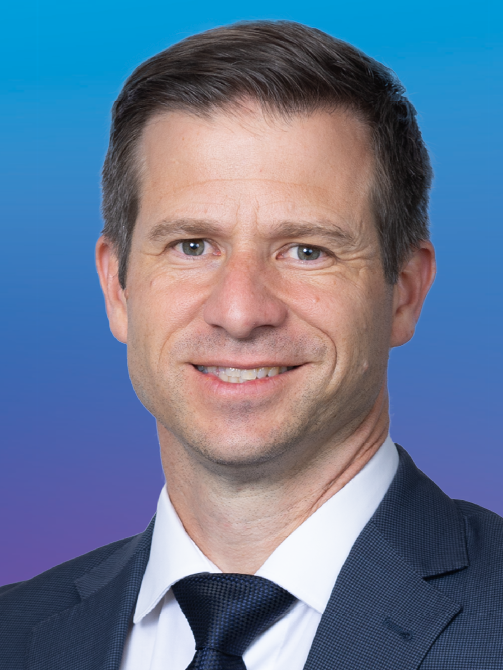
- Penk in 2023

44th Minister of Defence
- In office 7 April 2026 – 13 August 2026
- Leader: Christopher Luxon
- Preceded by: Judith Collins
- Succeeded by: Paul Goldsmith

10th Minister for Building and Construction
- In office 27 November 2023 – 13 August 2026
- Prime Minister: Christopher Luxon
- Preceded by: Megan Woods
- Succeeded by: Simon Watts

32nd Minister for Veterans
- In office 27 November 2023 – 13 August 2026
- Prime Minister: Christopher Luxon
- Preceded by: Peeni Henare
- Succeeded by: Paul Goldsmith

Minister Responsible for the Government Communications Security Bureau
- In office 7 April 2026 – 13 August 2026
- Prime Minister: Christopher Luxon
- Preceded by: Judith Collins
- Succeeded by: Paul Goldsmith

Minister Responsible for the New Zealand Security Intelligence Service
- In office 7 April 2026 – 13 August 2026
- Prime Minister: Christopher Luxon
- Preceded by: Judith Collins
- Succeeded by: Paul Goldsmith

2nd Minister for Space
- In office 7 April 2026 – 13 August 2026
- Prime Minister: Christopher Luxon
- Preceded by: Judith Collins
- Succeeded by: Paul Goldsmith

Associate Minister for Emergency Management
- In office 7 April 2026 – 13 August 2026
- Prime Minister: Christopher Luxon

18th Minister for Land Information
- In office 27 November 2023 – 7 April 2026
- Prime Minister: Christopher Luxon
- Preceded by: Damien O'Connor
- Succeeded by: Mike Butterick

2nd Minister for Small Business and Manufacturing
- In office 24 January 2025 – 7 April 2026
- Prime Minister: Christopher Luxon
- Preceded by: Andrew Bayly
- Succeeded by: Cameron Brewer

Senior Whip of the National Party
- In office 7 December 2021 – 5 December 2023
- Deputy: Maureen Pugh
- Leader: Christopher Luxon
- Preceded by: Matt Doocey
- Succeeded by: Scott Simpson

Member of the New Zealand Parliament for Kaipara ki Mahurangi (2020–2026) Helensville (2017–2020)
- In office 23 September 2017 – 7 November 2026
- Preceded by: John Key
- Succeeded by: Jessica Rowe
- Majority: 4,435

Personal details
- Born: Christopher Aidan Penk; 1979 (age 46–47) Auckland, New Zealand
- Party: National
- Education: University of Auckland

Christopher Aidan Penk (born 1979) is a New Zealand politician who was a member of Parliament in the House of Representatives with the National Party representing the western/northern Auckland electorates of Helensville and Kaipara ki Mahurangi from 2017 to 2026.

Following the 2023 general election, he was assigned the ministerial portfolios of building and construction, land and information, veterans, associate defence, and associate immigration, and then small business and manufacturing also in 2025. In 2026, Penk gained the defence and space portfolios, along with the portfolios for the intelligence agencies New Zealand Security Intelligence Service (NZSIS) and the Government Communications Security Bureau (GCSB), and associate emergency management.

In August 2026, Penk was dismissed from all his ministerial portfolios by Prime Minister Christopher Luxon after triggering an unsuccessful leadership challenge. Following his dismissal, Penk announced that he would retire from Parliament at the 2026 New Zealand general election.

== Early life and career ==
Penk was born in West Auckland. He was born in 1979, and has described himself to The Spinoff as a Capricorn, meaning Penk was born in either early January or late December. He attended Kelston Boys' High School and graduated from the University of Auckland with a Bachelor of Arts in 1999 and a Bachelor of Laws with Honours in 2010. He joined the Royal New Zealand Navy, serving as an officer on HMNZS Te Kaha. He was an aide-de-camp for Governor-General Silvia Cartwright, before joining the Australian Defence Force for four years.

After his military career, Penk became a property lawyer. His father, Stephen, is an Associate Dean at the University of Auckland's Law School and his brother Alex is also a lawyer. Penk's mother, Debra, was a teacher.

== Political career ==
In August 2014, Penk was selected to contest the Kelston electorate in the general election after the resignation of Claudette Hauiti. He placed second behind Carmel Sepuloni. Penk was ranked 68th on the National Party's party list and was not elected to Parliament.

=== Member of Parliament ===
New Zealand Parliament
| Years | Term | Electorate | List | Party |
|---|---|---|---|---|
| 2017–2020 | 52nd | Helensville | 64 | National |
| 2020–2023 | 53rd | Kaipara ki Mahurangi | 41 | National |
| 2023–2026 | 54th | Kaipara ki Mahurangi | 18 | National |

=== In Opposition, 2017–2023 ===
Penk won selection as National's Helensville candidate for the 2017 election, replacing former prime minister John Key. He won Helensville, defeating Labour's candidate Kurt Taogaga by margin of 14,608 votes. In his first term, he was a member of the parliamentary committees for transport and infrastructure; foreign affairs, defence and trade; and justice and the National party opposition spokesperson for courts.

During the 2020 New Zealand general election, Penk contested the Kaipara ki Mahurangi electorate, defeating Labour's candidate Marja Lubeck by a margin of 4,435 votes. He was appointed National's shadow attorney-general and elected chair of parliament's regulations review committee, which he held from November 2020 until October 2022.

| Chris Penk | Twitter |
@ChrisPenknz

Winston Peters is the real s*x maniac because he can f**k a whole country at once

20 June 2021

| Neale Jones | Twitter |
@nealejones

Can't stop laughing at this.

20 June 2021

In June 2021, in response to Winston Peters describing National Party members as "sex maniacs", Penk made a tweet saying Peters "is the real s*x maniac because he can f**k a whole country at once". Judith Collins said her office asked Penk to take down the tweet. Collins said "It's just simply inappropriate, we don't use that sort of language."

On 7 December 2021, after the election of Christopher Luxon as party leader, the National caucus elected Penk as its Senior Whip, thus making him the Chief Opposition Whip in the House of Representatives.

On 12 August 2023, Penk made an online comment "Sorry but your poor ratings crashed an entire radio station" in response to an article by Tova O'Brien about National Party election strategy. Christopher Luxon said the comment was "insensitive and inappropriate" because many people lost their jobs when Today FM closed. Penk apologised for the comment.

=== In Government, 2023–2026 ===
Penk was elected for a third term at the 2023 New Zealand general election, retaining Kaipara ki Mahurangi for National. He defeated Labour's candidate Guy Wishart by a margin of 19,459 votes.

Following the formation of the National-led coalition government in late November 2023, Penk became Minister for Building and Construction, Minister for Land Information, Minister for Veterans, Associate Minister of Defence, and Associate Minister of Immigration.

During a cabinet reshuffle on 19 January 2025, Penk assumed the Small Business and Manufacturing ministerial portfolio. He became Associate Minister for Emergency Management and Recovery after the January 2026 New Zealand storms.

Following a cabinet reshuffle in early April 2026, Penk joined Cabinet and gained the defence, Government Communications Security Bureau (GCSB), New Zealand Security Intelligence Service (NZSIS) and space ministerial portfolios.

==== Building and construction ====
In early July 2024, Penk announced that the Government would make remote virtual inspections the default for building consents across New Zealand in an effort to accelerate the building process. In mid July, Penk confirmed that the Government was exploring plans to reduce new insulation standards introduced in May 2023 with the goal of making newer houses more affordable and accelerating the home construction process. During an interview with RNZ, Penk said that the new insulation standards added costs amounting to between $40,000 to $50,000 to new houses. In response, the Green Building Council expressed concerns that the Government's proposed rollback of insulation standards would set New Zealand back in comparison to other OECD countries.

In mid-August 2025, Penk announced that the Government would introduce legislation to overhaul the building consent system. Key changes include scrapping the current "joint and several liability" regime with a "proportional liability" system and streamlining the 67 existing local Building Consent Authorities. Building Industry Federation chief executive Julien Leys urged the Government to introduce mandatory insurance and eligibility standards in response to plans to overhaul the building consent system. Master Builders chief executive Ankit Sharma welcomed plans to overhaul the building consent system but urged the Government to address liability settings. Local Government New Zealand President Sam Broughton said the Government's proposals would help accelerate the building of houses.

==== Associate immigration ====
In December 2024, in his role as Associate Minister of Immigration, Penk intervened to approve the visa application of controversial American commentator and speaker Candace Owens, whose visa had previously been declined by Immigration New Zealand in November on the grounds that she had been denied entry to Australia for reasons that included denying the impact of the Holocaust and claiming that Muslims started slavery. Owens had submitted a request for ministerial intervention to Penk asking him to exercise his discretionary powers and grant her a visa. In mid-March 2025, The Spinoff current affairs website reported that the advocacy group Free Speech Union had lobbied Penk into overturning Immigration New Zealand's decision to bar Owens entry into New Zealand.

In mid-February 2025, Penk was criticised by lawyer Alastair McClymont for defending an Immigration New Zealand decision to commence deportation proceedings against an 18-year old New Zealand-born teenager named Daman Kumar. Despite living his entire life in New Zealand, Kumar did not have residency rights since his parents had overstayed their visas. McClymont likened Kumar's situation to the second Trump administration's policy of accelerating undocumented migrant deportations. Following a meeting with Green MP Ricardo Menéndez March, Penk reversed his decision and used his discretionary powers to grant Kumar a residency visa. However, he upheld Immigration NZ's deportation proceedings against Kumar's overstayer parents.

==== Land information ====
On 19 December 2024, Penk, as Minister for Land Information, declined a proposal by the Hutt City Council to rename Hutt Valley suburb Petone to Pito One, in order to correct a historic spelling error. Despite the Geographic Board, local council, iwi groups, and community all supporting the change, Penk pointed to the need to achieve "a balance of official advice and public submissions". Penk also declined the proposal to add macrons and change the spelling of Rangitikei District to "Rangitīkei" and Manawatu District to "Manawatū".

On 23 May 2025, Penk and the New Zealand Geographic Board declined a proposal by the Kororāreka Marae Society to rename Russell to its Māori language name "Kororāreka".

==== Veterans ====
As Minister for Veterans, Penk received NZSAS veteran Willie Apiata's Victoria Cross medal in early April 2025. Apiata had returned his Victoria Cross medal as part of efforts to lobby the New Zealand Government to expand the legal definition of military veterans. On 11 April, Penk confirmed that the Government would be expanding the definition of military veterans and creating a new national veterans day. However, the Government would not be increasing eligibility for support entitlements under the Veteran Supports' Act.

==== Defence ====
In early October 2025, Penk as associate defence minister and Defence Minister Judith Collins launched the Government's Defence Industry Strategy, which seeks to encourage New Zealand companies to export "lethal weapons" to the international market.

As Defence Minister, Penk signed a statement of intent with Papua New Guinea's Defence Minister Elias Kapavore to boost bilateral defence cooperation between the two countries on 23 July 2026. Key provisions included Papua New Guinea seeking support from the Pacific Islands Forum in times of crises, expanding joint maritime cooperation, defence dialogue, training exercises, and military exchanges.

==== Associate emergency management and recovery ====
On 17 March 2026, Penk appointed former Supreme Court justice Mark O'Regan as the chair of the New Zealand government's inquiry into the Mount Maunganui and Papamoa landslides which occurred during the January 2026 New Zealand storms.

==== 2026 leadership challenge ====
On 12 August 2026, Penk was dismissed from all ministerial portfolios by Prime Minister Christopher Luxon after launching an unsuccessful leadership challenge that triggered a confidence vote in the National Party caucus. Luxon stated that the challenge had made Penk's continuation as a minister "untenable". Paul Goldsmith assumed the defence, veterans, space, Government Communications Security Bureau and New Zealand Security Intelligence Service portfolios while Simon Watts assumed the Building and Construction portfolio. Following his dismissal, Penk announced he would not seek re-election at the 2026 New Zealand general election. On 17 August 2026, Penk was granted retention of the title The Honourable for life, in recognition of his service as a member of the Executive Council.

== Political views ==
In an interview before the 2017 general election, Penk self-described as "a social moderate... towards the conservative end [of the National Party]."

Penk was one of only eight MPs to vote against the Conversion Practices Prohibition Legislation Act 2022. He voted against it at its first reading in July 2021 (which then-party-leader Judith Collins instructed her MPs to do), for it at its second reading, and against it at its third and final reading in February 2022.

== Personal life ==
Penk married Newshub journalist Kim Choe; their first child was born shortly before the 2017 election.

New Zealand Parliament
| Preceded by John Key | Member of Parliament for Helensville; 2017–2020 | Constituency abolished |
| New constituency | Member of Parliament for Kaipara ki Mahurangi; 2020–present | Incumbent |
Political offices
| Preceded by Megan Woods | Minister for Building and Construction; 2023–2026 | Succeeded by Simon Watts |
| Preceded by Damien O'Connor | Minister for Land Information; 2023–2026 | Succeeded by Mike Butterick |
| Preceded by Peeni Henare | Minister for Veterans; 2023–2026 | Succeeded by Paul Goldsmith |
| Preceded by Andrew Bayly | Minister for Small Business and Manufacturing; 2025–2026 | Succeeded by Cameron Brewer |
| Preceded by Judith Collins | Minister of Defence; 2026 | Succeeded by Paul Goldsmith |
| Preceded by Judith Collins | Minister Responsible for the Government Communications Security Bureau; 2026 | Succeeded by Paul Goldsmith |
| Preceded by Judith Collins | Minister Responsible for the New Zealand Security Intelligence Service; 2026 | Succeeded by Paul Goldsmith |
| Preceded by Judith Collins | Minister for Space; 2026 | Succeeded by Paul Goldsmith |
