= Minister for Veterans (New Zealand) =

New Zealand political office

- Coat of arms of New Zealand

- Flag of New Zealand

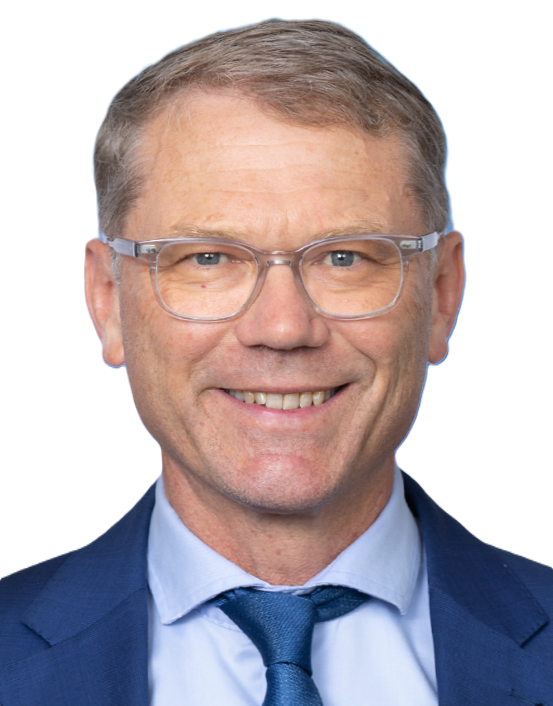
- Incumbent; Paul Goldsmith since 13 August 2026
- Veterans’ Affairs New Zealand
- Style: The Honourable
- Member of: Cabinet of New Zealand; Executive Council
- Reports to: Prime Minister of New Zealand
- Appointer: Governor-General of New Zealand
- Term length: At His Majesty's pleasure

The Minister for Veterans is a minister in the New Zealand Government responsible for issues relating to veterans, including the Veteran's Pension, and supporting attendance by veterans at commemorative events.

== History ==
The position of Minister in charge of War Pensions was created during the First World War, with the earliest reference to that role in Hansard dated at June 1916 although it is unknown exactly when the first appointment was made. The earliest known holder was James Allen, then the Minister of Defence. Most subsequent war pensions ministers were also concurrently appointed as defence minister; the only exceptions were Arthur Kinsella, Michael Cullen, Roger Sowry and Don McKinnon.

The portfolio was renamed Minister of Veterans' Affairs on 1 September 1999. This followed the passage of the Veterans' Affairs Act 1999, which transferred responsibility for war pensions to the New Zealand Defence Force (NZDF). Veterans’ Affairs New Zealand is a semi-autonomous unit within NZDF which provides administrative support to the Minister. The portfolio title was changed again to Minister for Veterans on 26 October 2017.

== List of ministers ==
The following ministers held the office of Minister for Veterans.

Key

Reform United Labour National New Zealand First

| No. | Name | Portrait | Term of Office | | Prime Minister |
|---|---|---|---|---|---|
| 1 | James Allen | | June 1916 | 28 April 1920 | Massey |
| 2 | Heaton Rhodes | | 21 July 1920 | 18 January 1926 | Massey |
| 2 | Heaton Rhodes | | 21 July 1920 | 18 January 1926 | Bell |
| 2 | Heaton Rhodes | | 21 July 1920 | 18 January 1926 | Coates |
| 3 | Frank Rolleston | | 18 January 1926 | 26 November 1928 | Coates |
| 4 | William Downie Stewart Jr | | 28 November 1928 | 10 December 1928 | Coates |
| 5 | Thomas Wilford | | 10 December 1928 | 10 December 1929 | Ward |
| 6 | John Cobbe | | 10 December 1929 | 6 December 1935 | Ward |
| 6 | John Cobbe | | 10 December 1929 | 6 December 1935 | Forbes |
| 7 | Fred Jones | | 6 December 1935 | 13 December 1949 | Savage |
| 7 | Fred Jones | | 6 December 1935 | 13 December 1949 | Fraser |
| 8 | Tom Macdonald | | 13 December 1949 | 26 September 1957 | Holland |
| 9 | Dean Eyre | | 26 September 1957 | 12 December 1957 | Holyoake |
| 10 | Phil Connolly | | 12 December 1957 | 12 December 1960 | Nash |
| 11 | Arthur Kinsella | | 12 December 1960 | 12 December 1966 | Holyoake |
| 12 | David Thomson | | 12 December 1966 | 9 February 1972 | Holyoake |
| 13 | Allan McCready | | 9 February 1972 | 8 December 1972 | Marshall |
| 14 | Arthur Faulkner | | 8 December 1972 | 10 September 1974 | Kirk |
| 15 | Bill Fraser | | 10 September 1974 | 12 December 1975 | Rowling |
| (13) | Allan McCready | | 12 December 1975 | 13 December 1978 | Muldoon |
| 14 | Frank Gill | | 13 December 1978 | 21 August 1980 | Muldoon |
| (12) | David Thomson | | 28 August 1980 | 26 July 1984 | Muldoon |
| 15 | Frank O'Flynn | | 26 July 1984 | 24 July 1987 | Lange |
| 16 | Michael Cullen | | 24 July 1987 | 2 November 1990 | Lange |
| 16 | Michael Cullen | | 24 July 1987 | 2 November 1990 | Palmer |
| 16 | Michael Cullen | | 24 July 1987 | 2 November 1990 | Moore |
| 17 | Warren Cooper | | 2 November 1990 | 1 March 1996 | Bolger |
| 18 | Paul East | | 1 March 1996 | 5 December 1997 | Bolger |
| 19 | Roger Sowry | | 5 December 1997 | 31 August 1998 | Shipley |
| 20 | Don McKinnon | | 31 August 1998 | 10 December 1999 | Shipley |
| 21 | Mark Burton | | 10 December 1999 | 15 August 2002 | Clark |
| 22 | George Hawkins | | 15 August 2002 | 19 October 2005 | Clark |
| 23 | Rick Barker | | 19 October 2005 | 19 November 2008 | Clark |
| 24 | Judith Collins | | 19 November 2008 | 14 December 2011 | Key |
| 25 | Nathan Guy | | 14 December 2011 | 31 January 2013 | Key |
| 26 | Michael Woodhouse | | 31 January 2013 | 8 October 2014 | Key |
| 27 | Craig Foss | | 8 October 2014 | 20 December 2016 | Key |
| 28 | David Bennett | | 20 December 2016 | 26 October 2017 | English |
| 29 | Ron Mark | | 26 October 2017 | 6 November 2020 | Ardern |
| 30 | Meka Whaitiri | | 6 November 2020 | 3 May 2023 | Ardern |
| 30 | Meka Whaitiri | | 6 November 2020 | 3 May 2023 | Hipkins |
| 31 | Peeni Henare (Note: Henare acted in the portfolio from 3 May 2023 until his formal appointment on 10 May 2023.) | | 10 May 2023 | 27 November 2023 | Hipkins |
| 32 | Chris Penk | | 27 November 2023 | 13 August 2026 | Luxon |
| 33 | Paul Goldsmith | | 13 August 2026 | Incumbent | Luxon |
