= Minister for Small Business and Manufacturing =

New Zealand political office

- Coat of arms of New Zealand

- Flag of New Zealand

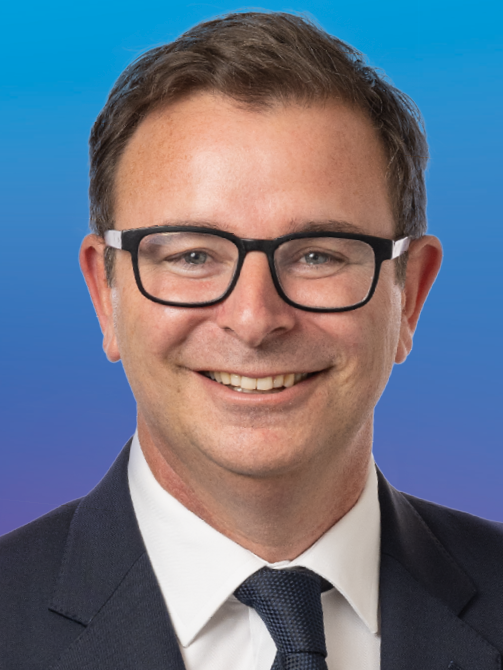
- Incumbent; Cameron Brewer since 7 April 2026
- Style: The Honourable
- Member of: Cabinet of New Zealand; Executive Council
- Reports to: Prime Minister of New Zealand
- Appointer: Governor-General of New Zealand
- Term length: At His Majesty's pleasure
- Formation: 27 November 2023
- First holder: Andrew Bayly

The Minister for Small Business and Manufacturing is a minister in the New Zealand Government responsible for small business and the manufacturing sector in New Zealand.

The first Minister was Andrew Bayly, who resigned the position in February 2025 after an altercation with a staff member. He was succeeded by Chris Penk. The current Minister for Small Business and Manufacturing is Cameron Brewer.

== List of Ministers for Small Business and Manufacturing ==
The following ministers have held the office for Small Business and Manufacturing.

Key

National

No.	Name	Portrait	Term of office		Prime Minister
1	Andrew Bayly		27 November 2023	24 January 2025	Luxon
2	Chris Penk		24 January 2025	7 April 2026	Luxon
3	Cameron Brewer		7 April 2026	Incumbent	Luxon
