= Ministers in the New Zealand Government =

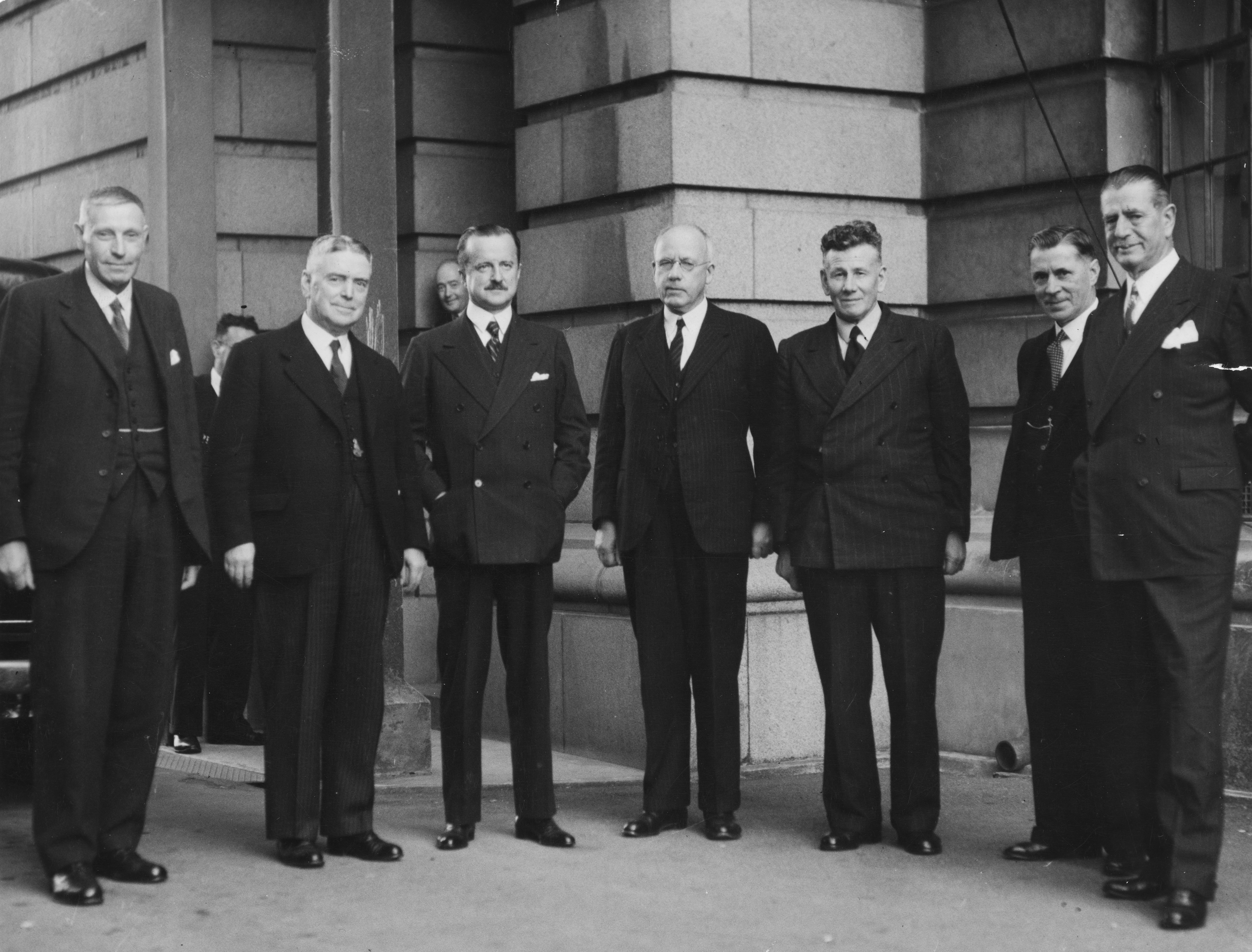
Ministers of Peter Fraser's war cabinet, 1941 (Note: Showing from left to right: Adam Hamilton; Walter Nash, Minister of Finance; British politician Duff Cooper; Prime Minister Peter Fraser; Dan Sullivan, Minister of Supply; Fred Jones, Minister of Defence; Gordon Coates, Minister of Armed Forces and War Co-ordination.)

Ministers (Māori: nga minita) in the New Zealand Government are members of Parliament (MPs) who hold ministerial warrants from the Crown to perform certain functions of government. This includes formulating and implementing policies and advising the governor-general. Ministers collectively make up the executive branch of the New Zealand state. The governor-general is obliged to follow the advice of the prime minister on the appointment and dismissal of ministers.

Most ministers are members of Cabinet, and all ministers, including those outside Cabinet, serve concurrently as councillors of the Executive Council of New Zealand. These executives are also formally titled "ministers of the Crown", as in other Commonwealth realms.

== Terminology ==
"Minister of the Crown" (Māori: minita o te Karauna) is the formal title used in Commonwealth realms to describe a minister of the reigning sovereign or governor-general. The legal term "the Crown" vaguely refers to both the sovereign and the state, the latter encompassing the branches of government. In New Zealand, an adviser to the sovereign or governor-general is also referred to simply as "minister", but the formal title is used in the New Zealand Cabinet Manual.

== Appointment and dismissal ==
"I, [name], being chosen and admitted of the Executive Council of New Zealand, swear that I will to the best of my judgement, at all times, when thereto required, freely give my counsel and advice to the Governor-General for the time being, for the good management of the affairs of New Zealand. That I will not directly nor indirectly reveal such matters as shall be debated in Council and committed to my secrecy, but that I will in all things be a true and faithful Councillor. So help me God".

— Executive councillor's oath

The appointment of an MP as a minister is formally made by the governor-general, who must sign a ministerial warrant before it officially comes into effect. The governor-general appoints the prime minister (head of government) on the basis of whether they are able to command the confidence of Parliament. The prime minister will advise the governor-general on the appointment or dismissal of other ministers. The first appointments are made whenever a new government takes office, and thereafter whenever a vacancy arises (due to a minister being dismissed or resigning). Each minister takes an oath (or affirmation) of office. (Note: Historically most ministers swore an oath on the Bible, but now many choose to affirm their intent, without reference to God.)

The recommendations that the prime minister chooses to give are theoretically their own affair, but the political party (or parties) behind them will almost certainly have views on the matter, and most recommendations are made only after negotiation and bargaining. Different parties have different mechanisms for this – the Labour Party, for example, has provision for its parliamentary caucus to select ministers, while the National Party allows the prime minister to select ministers at their discretion.

== Responsibilities and powers ==
The formal powers of the executive are exercised through the Executive Council, which consists of all ministers, and is headed by the governor-general. When the Executive Council resolves to issue an order, and the order is signed by the governor-general, it becomes legally binding.

At the same time as they are appointed to the Executive Council, a minister is generally charged with supervising a particular aspect of the government's activities, known as a "portfolio", such as the provision of health services (minister of health) or the upkeep of law enforcement (minister of police). A minister with portfolio is also responsible for a corresponding public sector organisation, usually known as a department or ministry.

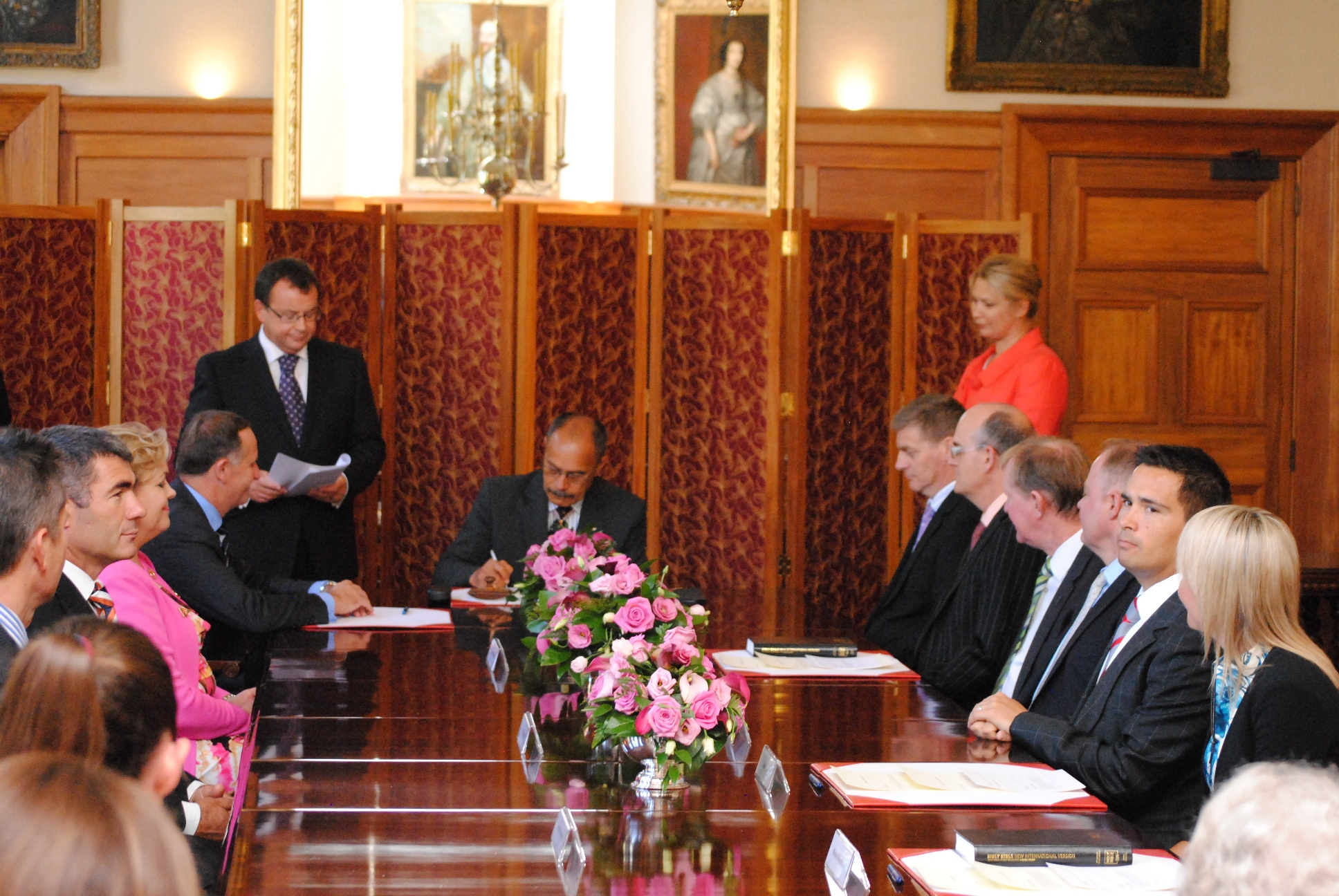
The Governor-General, Sir Jerry Mateparae, signs the warrants for new ministers of the Crown, January 2013

A "warrant" from the Crown is a formal written authority that is granted by the governor-general to a minister. The warrant sets out the minister's responsibilities, powers, and duties within their portfolio. It is essentially a legal document that gives a minister the authority to carry out their duties, and is necessary for them to be able to exercise the powers and functions of their portfolio.

Ministers without portfolio are MPs appointed as minister without a specific role. Such appointments have become rare today, although sometimes an MP may be appointed to a sinecure portfolio such as "minister of state" for similar purposes.

Individual ministerial responsibility is a constitutional convention that a minister is ultimately responsible for the decisions and actions (and the consequences that follow) of individuals and organisations for which they have ministerial responsibility. Individual ministerial responsibility is not the same as cabinet collective responsibility, which states members of Cabinet must approve publicly of its collective decisions or resign.

== History ==
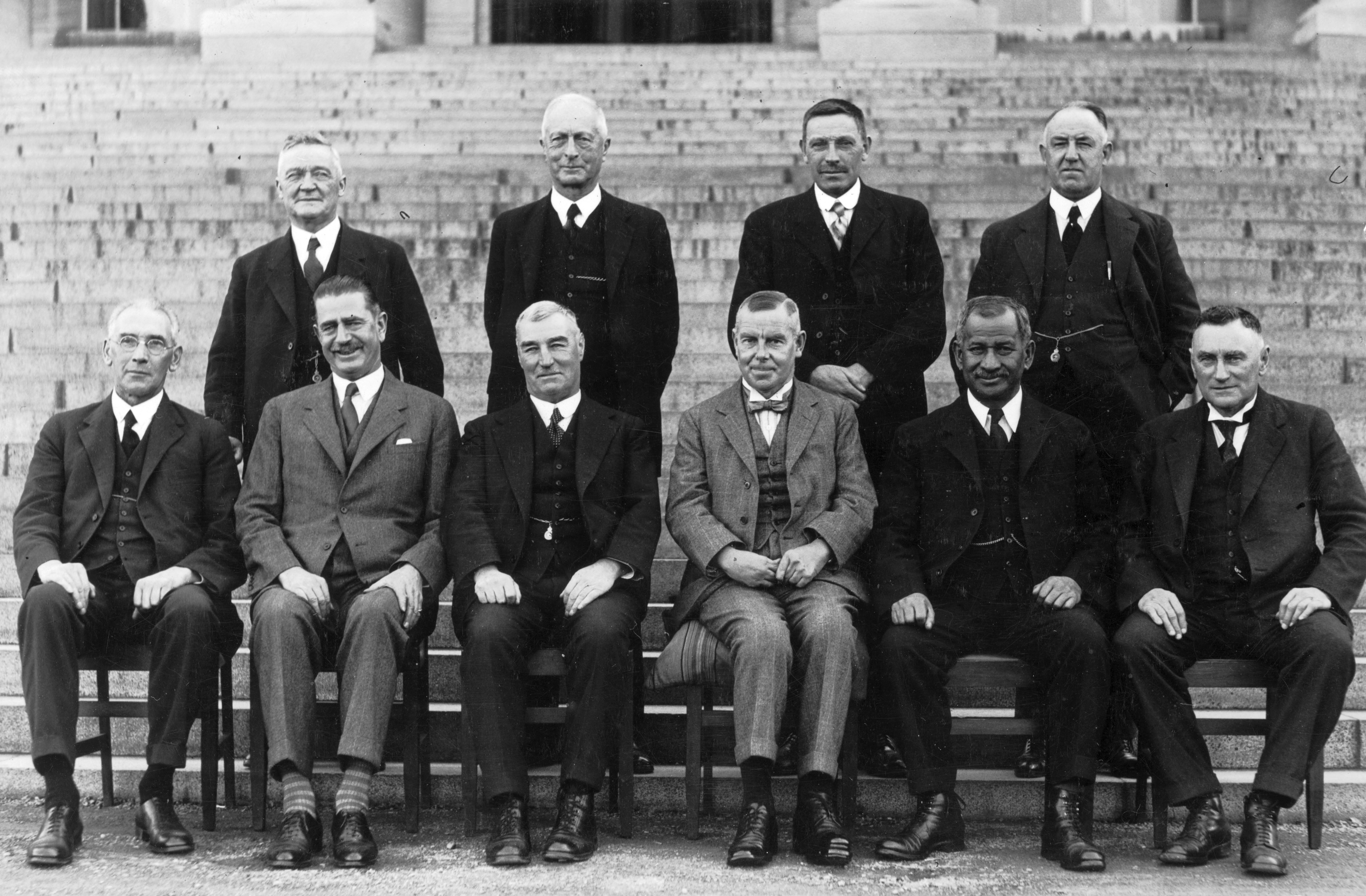
Ministers of the Coalition Cabinet, 1931 (Note: In the front row are (left to right): Alfred Ransom, Gordon Coates, Prime Minister George Forbes, William Downie Stewart Sr, Āpirana Ngata, and Alexander Young. In the back row are (left to right): David Jones, John Cobbe, Adam Hamilton, and Robert Masters.)

Originally, the Executive Council functioned as an advisory group to the governor, and ministerial functions were performed by appointed officials, not politicians. The various "ministers" serving on the Council, such as the Colonial Secretary (Andrew Sinclair from 1844) and the Colonial Treasurer (Alexander Shepherd from 1842), reported to the Governor. When Parliament was established, however, many believed that they would soon replace these appointed officials, with ministerial positions being given to members of Parliament instead. The Acting Governor, Robert Wynyard, did not agree, however, saying that the levers of government could not be turned over to Parliament without approval from United Kingdom of Great Britain and Ireland. The issue was controversial, and ended with the Acting Governor attempting (with only partial success) to suspend the 1st New Zealand Parliament.

Later, in the 2nd New Zealand Parliament, Parliament was victorious, and the first political ministers were appointed in the 1856 Sewell Ministry. Henry Sewell became Colonial Secretary, Dillon Bell became Colonial Treasurer, Frederick Whitaker became Attorney-General, and Henry Tancred became a minister without portfolio. Since then, all ministers have been appointed from among the ranks of Parliament.

Later, Parliament made further gains, with the convention being established that the governor-general's actions in the Executive Council were bound by the advice that ministers gave. Today, the Executive Council is not used for deliberation—rather, Cabinet is the forum for debate. The Executive Council formally advises the governor-general on decisions already agreed by Cabinet. Individual ministers must obtain collective agreement from Cabinet to bring items to the Executive Council.

== Ranking ==
The prime minister ranks the Cabinet ministers to determine seniority, or the "pecking order". This ranking depends on factors such as length of service, the relative prominence of a portfolio, and "personal standing with the prime minister". Lists of ministers are often ordered according to each individual minister's ranking.

== Prominent ministerial positions ==
- Prime Minister
- Deputy Prime Minister
- Minister of Agriculture
- Minister of Conservation
- Minister of Defence
- Minister of Education
- Minister of Finance
- Minister of Foreign Affairs
- Minister of Health
- Minister of Internal Affairs
- Minister of Justice
- Minister for Māori Development
- Minister of Social Development
- Minister of Transport
- Attorney-General

== List of current portfolios ==
As of 24 January 2025 the following ministerial portfolios exist. Many individuals hold multiple ministerial portfolios.

Portfolio
Prime Minister
Deputy Prime Minister
Leader of the House
Deputy Leader of the House
Minister for ACC
Minister of Agriculture
Minister for Arts, Culture and Heritage
Attorney-General
Minister for Auckland
Minister for Biosecurity
Minister for Building and Construction
Minister for Child Poverty Reduction
Minister for Children
Minister for Climate Change
Minister of Commerce and Consumer Affairs
Minister for the Community and Voluntary Sector
Minister of Conservation
Minister of Corrections
Minister for Courts
Minister of Customs
Minister of Defence
Minister for Digitising Government
Minister for Disability Issues
Minister for Economic Growth
Minister of Education
Minister for Emergency Management & Recovery
Minister of Energy
Minister for the Environment
Minister for Ethnic Communities
Minister of Finance
Minister for Food Safety
Minister of Foreign Affairs
Minister of Forestry
Minister Responsible for the GCSB
Lead Coordination Minister for the Government’s
Response to the Royal Commission’s Report
into Historical Abuse in State Care and in
the Care of Faith-based Institutions
Minister of Health
Minister of Housing
Minister for Hunting and Fishing
Minister of Immigration
Minister of Infrastructure
Minister of Internal Affairs
Minister of Justice
Minister for Land Information
Minister of Local Government
Minister Responsible for Ministerial Services
Minister for Māori Crown Relations – Te Arawhiti
Minister for Māori Development
Minister for Media and Communications
Minister for Mental Health
Minister for National Security and Intelligence
Minister Responsible for the NZSIS
Minister for Oceans and Fisheries
Minister for Pacific Peoples
Minister of Police
Minister for the Prevention of Family and Sexual Violence
Minister for the Public Service
Minister for Racing
Minister for Rail
Minister for Regional Development
Minister for Regulation
Minister for Resources
Minister of Revenue
Minister Responsible for RMA Reform
Minister for Rural Communities
Minister of Science, Innovation and Technology
Minister for Seniors
Minister for Small Business and Manufacturing
Minister for Social Development and Employment
Minister for Social Investment
Minister for the South Island
Minister for Space
Minister for Sport and Recreation
Minister for State Owned Enterprises
Minister of Statistics
Minister for Tourism and Hospitality
Minister for Trade
Minister of Transport
Minister for Treaty of Waitangi Negotiations
Minister for Universities
Minister for Veterans
Minister for Vocational Education
Minister for Whānau Ora
Minister for Women
Minister for Workplace Relations and Safety
Minister for Youth

== See also ==
- Parliamentary under-secretary
