= Brash: A Biography =

2005 book by Paul Goldsmith

- Author: Paul Goldsmith
- Publisher: Penguin Books
- Publication place: New Zealand
- ISBN: 0143019678

Brash: A Biography is a biography of New Zealand politician and economist Don Brash. The book was written by Paul Goldsmith and released in 2005. In 2006, investigative journalist Nicky Hager released a book The Hollow Men, which revealed the book was commissioned by the National Party.

== About the book ==
At the launch of the book, Goldsmith assured Danya Levy of the New Zealand Press Association that the book "was not commissioned by the National Party" and that it was his own initiative, but written with Brash's co-operation.

But as investigative journalist Nicky Hager in his book The Hollow Men revealed, it was indeed commissioned by the National Party, and was in fact the party's first big budget item in the 2005 election campaign. Hager quotes a 21 May 2004 email from Brash to Richard Long, who was his chief of staff, where a proposal from Christchurch publisher Willson Scott for the biography was discussed. Long replied two days later that he had discussed the book with Goldsmith, and Brash in reply wanted political historian Michael Bassett [a personal friend of Brash] to be considered.

The book was eventually commissioned with Goldsmith, and was paid for by National Party donors through a company called Silverbeat, which belonged to Brash's assistant Bryan Sinclair. National Party staff supplied Goldsmith with a collections of papers for the book, and Goldsmith first interviewed Brash in July 2004. Within weeks, Goldsmith supplied the first drafts to National Party staff, and the book was written in such a complimentary way that Brash commented on the final chapter: "I do not have a single word I would change". The working relationship with Brash got so close that Goldsmith even got to review a draft version of Brash's second Orewa Speech (dubbed Orewa 2); Goldsmith returned his draft to Brash on 10 November 2004, and some of the lines were kept for 25 January 2005 speech delivery.

Whilst the book was under production, Brash's team of advisers strategised how the biography could be used to best effect, or "as a significant marketing tool", as Brash himself called it in a 27 March 2005 email. To give the impression that the book was independently written was made more complicated by Goldsmith becoming a candidate in the Maungakiekie electorate during the book production, something that Long had advised against by stating that he had "warned the party and Goldsmith months ago that his candidacy would undermine the authority of the book and [he] urged him to hold off till next time [at the 2008 election]".

The biography was launched on 28 February 2005 in Auckland. Although it was nominally a project by the publisher Penguin Books, all arrangements for the launch were made by Sinclair. From a 15 February email from Goldsmith to Sinclair that contained a draft invite list that have four National Party donors listed immediately after Goldsmith's family but before his friends and with specific reference to "the above 4 ... need courtesy to invite", Hager thinks that it is possible that Doug Myers, Alan Gibbs, Craig Heatley, and David Richwhite were the ones who paid for the production of the biography. As such, the production costs of the biography do not form part of the election costs declared by the National Party for the 2005 campaign.
