= Minister for Child Poverty Reduction =

Minister in the New Zealand Government

- Coat of arms of New Zealand

- Flag of New Zealand

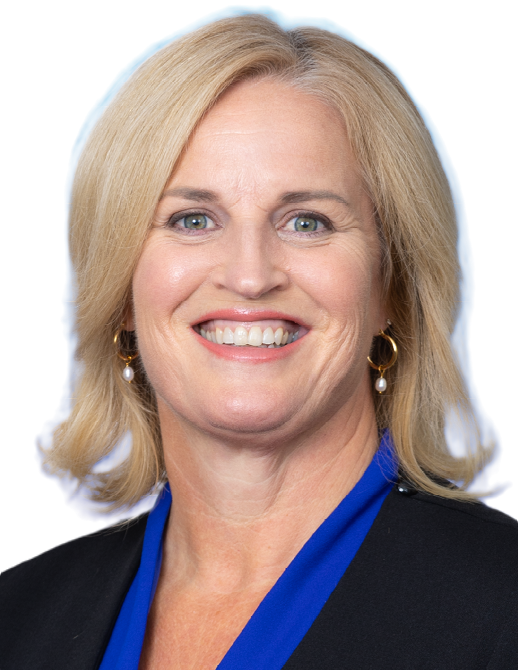
- Incumbent; Louise Upston since 27 November 2023
- Department of the Prime Minister and Cabinet
- Style: The Honourable
- Member of: Cabinet of New Zealand; Executive Council
- Reports to: Prime Minister of New Zealand
- Appointer: Governor-General of New Zealand
- Term length: At His Majesty's pleasure
- Formation: 26 October 2017
- First holder: Jacinda Ardern

The Minister for Child Poverty Reduction is a minister in the New Zealand Government responsible for overseeing and executing the Government's child poverty reduction strategy. The position was created upon the formation of the Sixth Labour Government and is currently held by Louise Upston.

== Role and responsibilities ==
During 2017 New Zealand election campaign, New Zealand Labour Party Leader Jacinda Ardern promised that a Labour government would introduce legislation to set the government a child poverty reduction target. Following the formation of the Labour-New Zealand First coalition government in October 2017 the position was created to introduce and execute Labour's child poverty reduction policy, and incoming Prime Minister Jacinda Ardern appointed herself to the post.

The portfolio is administered by the Department of the Prime Minister and Cabinet, and is responsible for coordinating and overseeing the Government's child poverty reduction strategy.

== List of ministers ==
Key

Labour National

No.	Name	Portrait	Term of office		Prime Minister
1	Jacinda Ardern		26 October 2017	25 January 2023	Ardern
2	Jan Tinetti		1 February 2023	27 November 2023	Hipkins
3	Louise Upston		27 November 2023	present	Luxon
