= Minister of Police (New Zealand) =

New Zealand political office

- Coat of arms of New Zealand

- Flag of New Zealand Police

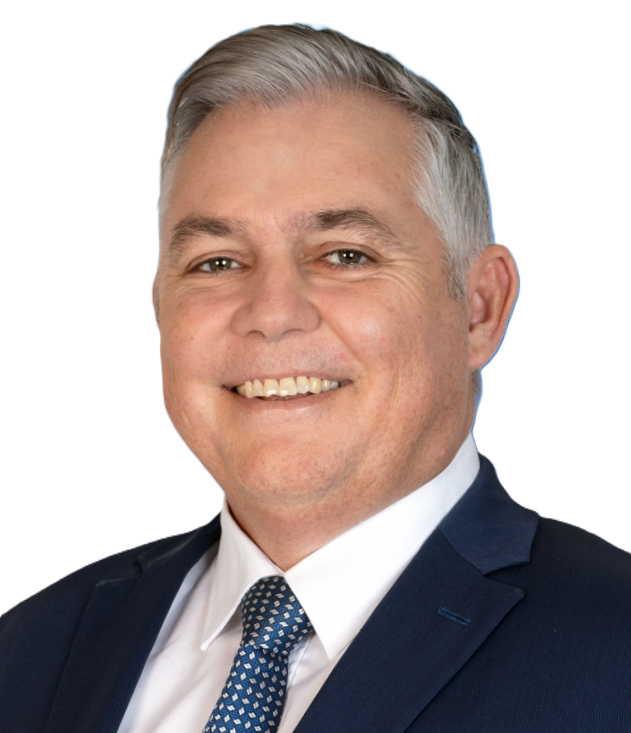
- Incumbent; Mark Mitchell since 27 November 2023
- New Zealand Police
- Style: The Honourable
- Member of: Cabinet of New Zealand; Executive Council
- Reports to: Prime Minister of New Zealand
- Appointer: Governor-General of New Zealand
- Term length: At His Majesty's pleasure
- Formation: 25 February 1896
- First holder: Thomas Thompson
- Salary: $288,900
- Website: www.beehive.govt.nz

The Minister of Police is the minister in the New Zealand Government with responsibility for the New Zealand Police.

The current officeholder is Mark Mitchell.

== History ==
Initially, responsibility for the police force had rested with the Minister of Defence but was instead allocated to the Minister of Justice in 1896. The minister responsible for police was, for the most part, the holder of either aforementioned office until it was later split into a separate full ministerial portfolio in 1969.

== List of Police Ministers ==
The following ministers have held the office of Minister of Police.

Key

Liberal Reform United Labour National NZ First Mauri Pacific

No.	Name	Portrait	Term of Office		Prime Minister
1	Thomas Thompson		25 February 1896	23 January 1900	Seddon
2	James McGowan		23 January 1900	6 January 1909	Seddon
2	James McGowan		23 January 1900	6 January 1909	Hall-Jones
2	James McGowan		23 January 1900	6 January 1909	Ward
3	John Findlay		6 January 1909	26 December 1911	Ward
4	Josiah Hanan		28 March 1912	10 July 1912	Mackenzie
5	Alexander Herdman		10 July 1912	4 February 1918	Massey
6	Thomas Wilford		4 February 1918	25 August 1919	Massey
7	William Massey		4 September 1919	3 April 1920	Massey
8	Ernest Lee		3 April 1920	13 January 1923	Massey
9	Francis Bell		13 January 1923	27 June 1923	Massey
10	James Parr		27 June 1923	18 January 1926	Massey
10	James Parr		27 June 1923	18 January 1926	Bell
10	James Parr		27 June 1923	18 January 1926	Coates
11	Frank Rolleston		18 January 1926	26 November 1928	Coates
12	William Downie Stewart Jr		26 November 1928	10 December 1928	Coates
(6)	Thomas Wilford		10 December 1928	10 December 1929	Ward
13	John Cobbe		18 December 1929	6 December 1935	Ward
13	John Cobbe		18 December 1929	6 December 1935	Forbes
14	Peter Fraser		6 December 1935	13 December 1949	Savage
14	Peter Fraser		6 December 1935	13 December 1949	Fraser
15	Sidney Holland		13 December 1949	18 January 1950	Holland
16	Wilfred Fortune		18 January 1950	26 November 1954	Holland
(15)	Sidney Holland		26 November 1954	7 December 1956	Holland
17	Dean Eyre		7 December 1956	12 December 1957	Holland
17	Dean Eyre		7 December 1956	12 December 1957	Holyoake
18	Phil Connolly		12 December 1957	12 December 1960	Nash
(17)	Dean Eyre		12 December 1960	20 December 1963	Holyoake
19	Percy Allen		20 December 1963	22 December 1969	Holyoake
20	David Thomson		22 December 1969	9 February 1972	Holyoake
(17)	Percy Allen		9 February 1972	8 December 1972	Marshall
21	Mick Connelly		8 December 1972	12 December 1975	Kirk
21	Mick Connelly		8 December 1972	12 December 1975	Rowling
22	Allan McCready		12 December 1975	13 December 1978	Muldoon
23	Frank Gill		13 December 1978	21 August 1980	Muldoon
24	Ben Couch		21 August 1980	26 July 1984	Muldoon
25	Ann Hercus		26 July 1984	16 September 1987	Lange
26	Peter Tapsell		16 September 1987	8 August 1989	Lange
27	Roger Douglas		8 August 1989	10 July 1990	Palmer
28	Richard Prebble		10 July 1990	2 November 1990	Palmer
28	Richard Prebble		10 July 1990	2 November 1990	Moore
29	John Banks		2 November 1990	2 March 1994	Bolger
30	John Luxton		2 March 1994	16 December 1996	Bolger
31	Jack Elder		16 December 1996	31 August 1998	Bolger
31	Jack Elder		16 December 1996	31 August 1998	Shipley
32	Clem Simich		31 August 1998	10 December 1999	Shipley
33	George Hawkins		10 December 1999	19 October 2005	Clark
34	Annette King		19 October 2005	19 November 2008	Clark
35	Judith Collins		19 November 2008	12 December 2011	Key
36	Anne Tolley		12 December 2011	7 October 2014	Key
37	Michael Woodhouse		8 October 2014	14 December 2015	Key
(35)	Judith Collins		14 December 2015	20 December 2016	Key
38	Paula Bennett		20 December 2016	26 October 2017	English
39	Stuart Nash		26 October 2017	6 November 2020	Ardern
40	Poto Williams		6 November 2020	14 June 2022	Ardern
41	Chris Hipkins		14 June 2022	25 January 2023	Ardern
(39)	Stuart Nash		1 February 2023	15 March 2023	Hipkins
-	Megan Woods acting minister		15 March 2023	20 March 2023	Hipkins
42	Ginny Andersen		20 March 2023	27 November 2023	Hipkins
43	Mark Mitchell		27 November 2023	present	Luxon
