= Minister of Justice (New Zealand) =

New Zealand minister of the Crown

- Coat of arms of New Zealand

- Flag of New Zealand

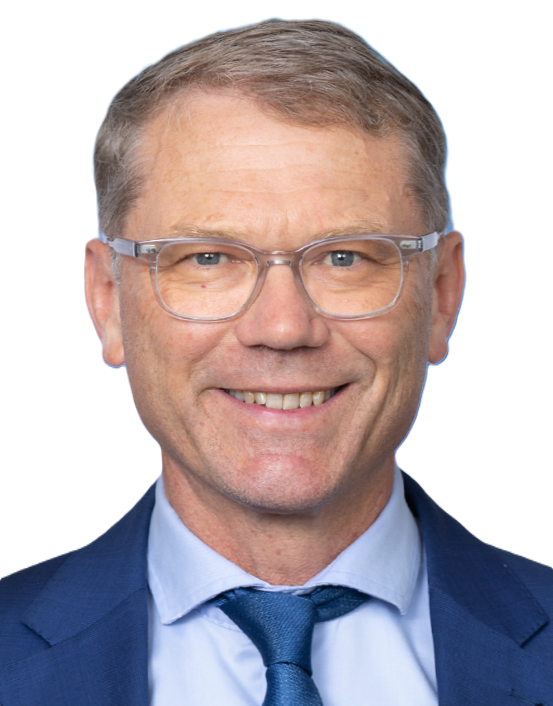
- Incumbent; Paul Goldsmith since 27 November 2023
- Ministry of Justice
- Style: The Honourable
- Member of: Cabinet of New Zealand; Executive Council
- Reports to: Prime Minister of New Zealand
- Appointer: Governor-General of New Zealand
- Term length: At His Majesty's pleasure
- Formation: 13 June 1870
- First holder: Henry Sewell
- Salary: $288,900
- Website: www.beehive.govt.nz

The Minister of Justice is a minister in the New Zealand Government. The minister has responsibility for the formulation of justice policy and for the administration of law courts.

The current Minister of Justice is Paul Goldsmith since 27 November 2023.

== History ==
The first Minister of Justice was appointed in 1870. This was followed in 1872 by the creation of the Department of Justice.

The Attorney-General is responsible for supervising New Zealand law and advising the Government on legal matters, and has ministerial jurisdiction over the Crown Law Office and the Parliamentary Counsel Office. The position is separate from that of 'Minister of Justice', though the two positions have sometimes been held by the same person, e.g. Geoffrey Palmer (1984 to 1989).

Responsibility for the police has never technically belonged to the Minister of Justice per se. Originally, the Minister of Defence was responsible. During the early 20th century, however, it became established that the person serving as Minister of Justice was also the minister in charge of the police. This continued until the election of the First Labour Government in 1935, when responsibility for the police became detached – the Minister of Police was eventually established as a full ministerial post in 1969.

In 1995, the Department of Justice was split into three parts – a Ministry of Justice would deal with policy matters, while the practical administration of the court system and the prison system would be given their own departments. This resulted in the creation of two new ministerial portfolios – Minister of Court and Minister of Corrections. The former has since been absorbed back into the Justice portfolio, but the latter is still independent.

== List of justice ministers ==
Key

Independent Liberal Reform United Labour National

No.	Name	Portrait	Term of Office		Prime Minister
1	Henry Sewell		13 June 1870	30 October 1871	Fox
2	John Bathgate		29 October 1872	20 February 1874	Waterhouse
2	John Bathgate		29 October 1872	20 February 1874	Fox
2	John Bathgate		29 October 1872	20 February 1874	Vogel
3	Maurice O'Rorke		20 February 1874	13 August 1874	Vogel
4	Charles Bowen		16 December 1874	13 October 1877	Vogel
4	Charles Bowen		16 December 1874	13 October 1877	Pollen
4	Charles Bowen		16 December 1874	13 October 1877	Vogel
4	Charles Bowen		16 December 1874	13 October 1877	Atkinson
5	John Sheehan		13 October 1877	8 October 1879	Grey
6	William Rolleston		15 December 1880	13 April 1881	Hall
7	Thomas Dick		13 April 1881	11 October 1882	Hall
7	Thomas Dick		13 April 1881	11 October 1882	Whitaker
8	Edward Conolly		11 October 1882	16 August 1884	Whitaker
8	Edward Conolly		11 October 1882	16 August 1884	Atkinson
9	Joseph Tole		3 September 1884	8 October 1887	Stout
10	Thomas Fergus		8 October 1887	17 October 1889	Atkinson
11	William Russell		17 October 1889	24 January 1891	Atkinson
12	William Pember Reeves		24 January 1891	28 May 1892	Ballance
13	Alfred Cadman		28 May 1892	1 May 1893	Ballance
13	Alfred Cadman		28 May 1892	1 May 1893	Seddon
(12)	William Pember Reeves		20 July 1893	6 September 1893	Seddon
(13)	Alfred Cadman		6 September 1893	28 March 1895	Seddon
(12)	William Pember Reeves		28 March 1895	10 January 1896	Seddon
14	William Hall-Jones		10 January 1896	2 March 1896	Seddon
15	Thomas Thompson		2 March 1896	23 January 1900	Seddon
16	James McGowan		23 January 1900	6 January 1909	Seddon
16	James McGowan		23 January 1900	6 January 1909	Hall-Jones
16	James McGowan		23 January 1900	6 January 1909	Ward
17	John Findlay		6 January 1909	26 December 1911	Ward
18	Josiah Hanan		28 March 1912	10 July 1912	Mackenzie
19	Alexander Herdman		10 July 1912	12 August 1915	Massey
20	Robert McNab		12 August 1915	20 February 1917	Massey
(18)	Josiah Hanan		20 February 1917	14 November 1917	Massey
21	Thomas Wilford		14 November 1917	25 August 1919	Massey
22	Gordon Coates		4 September 1919	3 April 1920	Massey
23	Ernest Lee		3 April 1920	13 January 1923	Massey
24	Francis Bell		13 January 1923	27 June 1923	Massey
25	James Parr		27 June 1923	18 January 1926	Massey
25	James Parr		27 June 1923	18 January 1926	Bell
25	James Parr		27 June 1923	18 January 1926	Coates
26	Frank Rolleston		18 January 1926	26 November 1928	Coates
27	William Downie Stewart Jr		26 November 1928	10 December 1928	Coates
(21)	Thomas Wilford		10 December 1928	10 December 1929	Ward
28	Thomas Sidey		18 December 1929	28 May 1930	Ward
29	John Cobbe		28 May 1930	6 December 1935	Forbes
30	Rex Mason		6 December 1935	13 December 1949	Savage
30	Rex Mason		6 December 1935	13 December 1949	Fraser
31	Clifton Webb		13 December 1949	26 November 1954	Holland
32	Jack Marshall		26 November 1954	12 December 1957	Holland
32	Jack Marshall		26 November 1954	12 December 1957	Holyoake
(30)	Rex Mason		12 December 1957	12 December 1960	Nash
33	Ralph Hanan		12 December 1960	24 July 1969	Holyoake
34	Dan Riddiford		22 December 1969	9 February 1972	Holyoake
35	Roy Jack		9 February 1972	8 December 1972	Marshall
36	Martyn Finlay		8 December 1972	12 December 1975	Kirk
36	Martyn Finlay		8 December 1972	12 December 1975	Rowling
37	David Thomson		12 December 1975	13 December 1978	Muldoon
38	Jim McLay		13 December 1978	26 July 1984	Muldoon
39	Geoffrey Palmer		26 July 1984	8 August 1989	Lange
40	Bill Jeffries		8 August 1989	2 November 1990	Palmer
40	Bill Jeffries		8 August 1989	2 November 1990	Moore
41	Doug Graham		2 November 1990	1 February 1999	Bolger
41	Doug Graham		2 November 1990	1 February 1999	Shipley
42	Tony Ryall		1 February 1999	10 December 1999	Shipley
43	Phil Goff		10 December 1999	19 October 2005	Clark
44	Mark Burton		19 October 2005	31 October 2007	Clark
45	Annette King		31 October 2007	19 November 2008	Clark
46	Simon Power		19 November 2008	12 December 2011	Key
47	Judith Collins		12 December 2011	30 August 2014	Key
–	Chris Finlayson; Acting Minister		30 August 2014	8 October 2014	Key
48	Amy Adams		8 October 2014	26 October 2017	Key
48	Amy Adams		8 October 2014	26 October 2017	English
49	Andrew Little		26 October 2017	6 November 2020	Ardern
50	Kris Faafoi		6 November 2020	14 June 2022	Ardern
51	Kiri Allan		14 June 2022	24 July 2023	Ardern
51	Kiri Allan		14 June 2022	24 July 2023	Hipkins
52	Ginny Andersen		24 July 2023	27 November 2023	Hipkins
53	Paul Goldsmith		27 November 2023	present	Luxon

== See also ==
- Justice ministry
- Law in New Zealand
- New Zealand Ministry of Justice
- Politics in New Zealand
