= Minister for Space =

New Zealand political office

- Coat of arms of New Zealand

- Flag of New Zealand

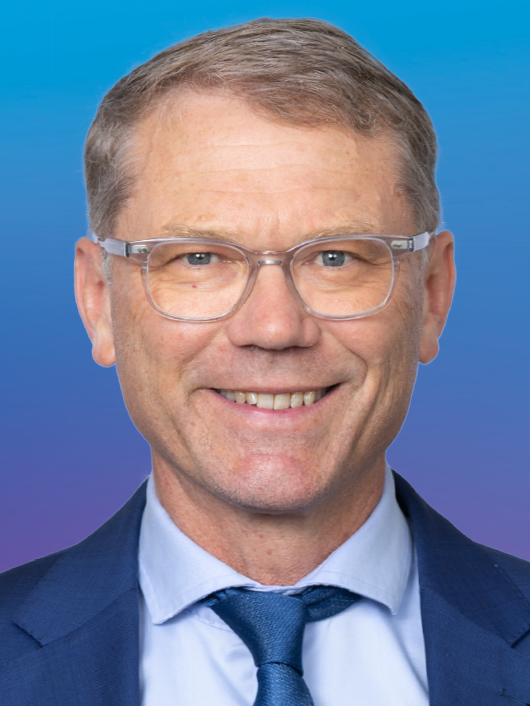
- Incumbent; Paul Goldsmith since 13 August 2026
- Ministry of Business, Innovation and Employment
- Style: The Honourable
- Member of: Cabinet of New Zealand; Executive Council
- Reports to: Prime Minister of New Zealand
- Appointer: Governor-General of New Zealand
- Term length: At His Majesty's pleasure
- Formation: 27 November 2023
- First holder: Judith Collins

The Minister for Space is a minister in the New Zealand Government with responsibility for outer space and advanced aviation in New Zealand.

The current Minister for Space is Paul Goldsmith of the National Party.

== History ==
In October 2023, National party leader Christopher Luxon promised a Minister for Space if his party was elected in the 2023 general election. The aim of the portfolio is to help promote the aerospace sector within New Zealand and to “streamline the rules” to focus on opening up immigration for aerospace workers. Previously the Minister for Economic Development was responsible for space-related policy. New Zealand is one of only 11 countries with active launch-to-orbit capability, and the industry contributes $1.7 billion to the New Zealand economy.

== List of Ministers for Space ==
The following ministers have held the office of Minister for Space.

Key

National

No.	Name	Portrait	Term of office		Prime Minister
1	Judith Collins		27 November 2023	7 April 2026	Luxon
2	Chris Penk		7 April 2026	13 August 2026	Luxon
3	Paul Goldsmith		13 August 2026	Incumbent	Luxon
