= Cultural report =

Document supplied to New Zealand courts

In the New Zealand judicial system a cultural report is a document supplied to the court in order to establish a cultural context for a defendant's actions and to aide in their rehabilitation. In New Zealand law, they are allowed under section 27 of the Sentencing Act 2002, and so are also called S27 reports. Although cultural reports are not required, they have become increasingly common since 2019, and are frequently submitted by defendants in order to receive lighter sentencing.

== History ==
The cost of cultural reports has been the subject of criticism, as the amount billed to legal aid or the Public Defence Service for cultural reports increased from $639,311 in 2019 to $3.3 million in 2020, and reached $5.91 million for the period between July 2021 and June 2022. The additional value of the reports has also been called into question, as critics like independent justice advocate Ruth Money suggest that pre-sentence reports provided by the probation services of Department of Corrections already provide background on defendants. Harry Tam, a Mongrel Mob member and consultant who provides cultural reports says that distinct from the pre-sentencing reports, S27 reports are "predominantly focused on looking at the disadvantages that may have contributed to the person’s offending behaviour and options to address it".

In 2018 the Ministry of Justice ceased funding for cultural reports, shifting that responsibility to legal aid.

=== 2024 Reform ===
On 7 February 2024, Justice Minister Paul Goldsmith announced that government funding for cultural reports would be stopped under the new National-led government. The Government's decision was criticised by People Against Prisons Aotearoa spokesperson Emmy Rākete, Green Party Tamatha Paul, Defence Lawyer Association founder Elizabeth Hall and Labour Party Member of Parliament Ginny Andersen, who claimed it was punitive, would disadvantage Māori and the working class, and impede the rehabilitation and treatment of prisoners with health and behavioural issues. By contrast, Goldsmith and ACT party justice spokesperson Todd Stephenson defended the scrapping of cultural reports on the grounds of their rising costs and prioritising victims' rights over their offenders. ACT party wanted to go much further by removing cultural reports from the Sentencing Act outright.

On 6 March 2024, the Government passed urgent legislation ending taxpayer funding for cultural reports.
