= Paul Goldsmith (politician) =

New Zealand politician (born 1971)

The Honourable Paul Goldsmith MP
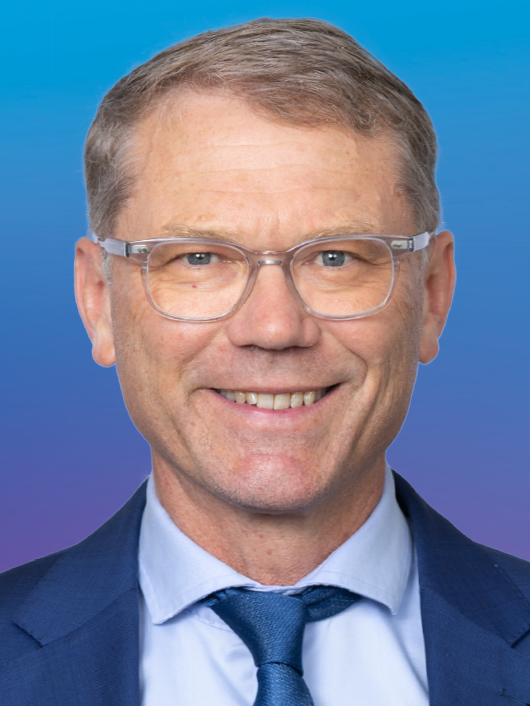
- Campaign portrait, 2023

29th Minister for Media and Communications
- Incumbent
- Assumed office 24 April 2024
- Prime Minister: Christopher Luxon
- Preceded by: Melissa Lee

53rd Minister of Justice
- Incumbent
- Assumed office 27 November 2023
- Prime Minister: Christopher Luxon
- Preceded by: Ginny Andersen

7th Minister for Treaty of Waitangi Negotiations
- Incumbent
- Assumed office 27 November 2023
- Prime Minister: Christopher Luxon
- Preceded by: Andrew Little

14th Minister for Arts, Culture and Heritage
- Incumbent
- Assumed office 27 November 2023
- Prime Minister: Christopher Luxon
- Preceded by: Carmel Sepuloni

18th Minister for State Owned Enterprises
- In office 27 November 2023 – 24 January 2025
- Prime Minister: Christopher Luxon
- Preceded by: Duncan Webb
- Succeeded by: Simeon Brown

45th Minister of Defence
- Incumbent
- Assumed office 13 August 2026
- Prime Minister: Christopher Luxon
- Preceded by: Chris Penk

3rd Minister for Space
- Incumbent
- Assumed office 13 August 2026
- Prime Minister: Christopher Luxon
- Preceded by: Chris Penk

Minister Responsible for the Government Communications Security Bureau
- Incumbent
- Assumed office 13 August 2026
- Prime Minister: Christopher Luxon
- Preceded by: Chris Penk

Minister Responsible for the New Zealand Security Intelligence Service
- Incumbent
- Assumed office 13 August 2026
- Prime Minister: Christopher Luxon
- Preceded by: Chris Penk

33rd Minister for Veterans
- Incumbent
- Assumed office 13 August 2026
- Prime Minister: Christopher Luxon
- Preceded by: Chris Penk

Member of the New Zealand Parliament for National Party list
- In office 26 November 2011 – 7 November 2026
Ministerial Offices 2014–2017
25th Minister for Science and Innovation
In office 20 December 2016 – 26 October 2017
Prime Minister	Bill English
Preceded by	Steven Joyce
Succeeded by	Megan Woods
Minister for Tertiary Education, Skills and Employment
In office 20 December 2016 – 26 October 2017
Prime Minister	Bill English
Preceded by	Steven Joyce
Succeeded by	Portfolio Disestablished
11th Minister of Commerce and Consumer Affairs
In office 8 October 2014 – 20 December 2016
Prime Minister	John Key; Bill English
Preceded by	Craig Foss
Succeeded by	Jacqui Dean
Minister of Regulatory Reform
In office 20 December 2016 – 26 October 2017
Prime Minister	Bill English
Preceded by	Steven Joyce
Succeeded by	Portfolio Disestablished

Personal details
- Born: Paul Jonathan Goldsmith; 1971 (age 54–55) Auckland, New Zealand
- Party: National Party
- Children: 4

Paul Jonathan Goldsmith (born 1971) is a New Zealand historian and politician. The biographer of several leading right-wing political and business figures, he was first elected a list member of the New Zealand House of Representatives for the National Party at the 2011 election.

Goldsmith is Minister for Arts, Culture and Heritage, Minister of Justice, Minister for Treaty of Waitangi Negotiations, Minister for Media and Communications, Minister for the Public Service, Minister for Digitising Government, and Minister for Pacific Peoples in the Sixth National Government. On 12 August 2026, he received the Minister of Defence, Minister for Veterans, Minister for Space portfolios after they were removed from Chris Penk, who had made an unsuccessful leadership challenge on Prime Minister Christopher Luxon. Goldsmith was an Auckland City Councillor between 2007 and 2010, and a Cabinet minister in the Fifth National Government.

== Early life and family ==
Goldsmith was born in 1971 in the Auckland suburb of Mount Eden to parents Lawrence, a mathematics teacher, and Margaret, a palliative care nurse. He has an older brother and sister. The Goldsmith family descends from Charles George Goldsmith, a migrant from Liverpool who settled in the East Cape area early in New Zealand's colonial history. Charles Goldsmith had four wives—two Māori (Ngāti Porou), and two Pākehā—fathering 16 children. Paul Goldsmith is not one of the descendants with Māori ancestry.

Goldsmith attended Auckland Grammar School and received an MA in history from the University of Auckland in 1996. His thesis was on the life of missionary William Colenso. Dame Judith Binney was his master's supervisor.

Paul Goldsmith is married to Melissa. They have four children. He is a pianist and a second-dan black belt in taekwondo.

== Career before politics ==
He began working as a historian for the Waitangi Tribunal in March 1995, contributing to the Tribunal's work on historic claims in Taranaki and Wairarapa. After a year, he moved to working for John Banks, then the National Party minister of local government, as a press secretary and speech writer. Goldsmith also began a biography of Banks during this period. Banks was not reappointed a minister after the 1996 election; Goldsmith moved to working for the environment minister Simon Upton and, after the 1999 election, the new Labour minister of foreign affairs Phil Goff.

In 2000, Goldsmith became a public relations adviser and worked for Tranz Rail and the University of Auckland.

=== Historian and biographer ===
Goldsmith has written the biographies of John Banks, Don Brash, William Gallagher, Alan Gibbs and Te Hemara Tauhia as well as a history of taxes, Puketutu Island and a history of the Fletcher Building construction company. The biographies were criticised in 2021 by labour historian Ross Webb as "hagiographies" of those involved in New Zealand's economic reforms in the 1980s and 1990s.

His Don Brash biography, Brash: A Biography, was a source of controversy. When it was released in 2005 he maintained it was not commissioned by the National Party, but investigative journalist Nicky Hager revealed it was indeed commissioned by the National Party and was in fact the party's first big-budget item in the 2005 election campaign.

== Early political career ==
Goldsmith contested the Maungakiekie electorate in the 2005 general election for the National Party. At this time, National was led by Don Brash, whose biography by Goldsmith was published the same year. Goldsmith was defeated by the incumbent, Labour's Mark Gosche, and due to his low list placing (59 on the National Party list), did not enter Parliament.

Goldsmith successfully stood for the Auckland City Council Hobson Ward at the 2007 local body elections as a member of Citizens & Ratepayers. He was appointed deputy finance chairman by Mayor John Banks and chaired the community services committee. During his term, Goldsmith was criticised by the Auckland City Mission and the Green Party for instructing council officers to investigate removing homeless people from the city centre and refusing to rule out arresting homeless people to do so.

He sought but missed out on the Citizens & Ratepayers candidacy in the Ōrākei ward of the new Auckland Council at the 2010 Auckland elections, and was instead selected to contest Albert-Eden-Roskill. He finished third, behind Christine Fletcher and Cathy Casey, in the two-member ward.

== Fifth National Government, 2011–2017 ==
New Zealand Parliament
Years	Term	Electorate	List	Party
2011–2014	50th	List	39	National
2014–2017	51st	List	30	National
2017–2020	52nd	List	18	National
2020–2023	53rd	List	3	National
2023–2026	54th	List	5	National

Goldsmith stood in the Epsom electorate at the 2011 general election, but lost the electorate vote to John Banks, who earlier in 2011 had joined ACT New Zealand. Goldsmith had been expected to lose; National leader John Key encouraged National voters to elect the ACT candidate in Epsom to keep the smaller party in Parliament. Goldsmith was ranked 39th on the National Party list and was elected as a list MP sitting in the 50th Parliament. During his first term in parliament, Goldsmith was deputy chairperson and, from 2013, chairperson of the finance and expenditure select committee. He was also a member of the local government and environment committee.

During the 2014 election, Goldsmith contested the Epsom electorate and came second to new ACT candidate David Seymour. Ranked 30th, Goldsmith was re-elected as a list MP. He was appointed a minister outside Cabinet from November 2014 until December 2016, responsible for commerce and consumer affairs. He was also associate minister for ACC. At the same time, he served on the Education and Science and Social Services select committees. Goldsmith was promoted into Cabinet for the government's final year, as Minister for Science and Innovation, Minister for Tertiary Education, Skills and Employment, and Minister for Regulatory Reform.

== Opposition, 2017–2023 ==
During the 2017 election, Goldsmith was re-elected as a list MP after coming second place in the Epsom electorate. At the beginning of the parliamentary term, as an opposition MP, he was the party spokesperson for arts, culture and heritage. Following the March 2018 National Party portfolio reshuffle, Goldsmith became spokesperson for revenue and economic and regional development. Later in the year, he lost the revenue portfolio, but became transport spokesperson.

In 2019, Goldsmith assumed the spokesperson role for finance and infrastructure and the third-ranked member of the National caucus. Stuff.co.nz writer Thomas Coughlan described him as "possibly the most libertarian or right-wing person to hold the shadow finance portfolio." Political columnist Danyl McLauchlan said Goldsmith was "possibly the only remaining member of his party who could be described as 'neoliberal'." Goldsmith was additionally spokesperson for state-owned enterprises between February and May 2020 and for the Earthquake Commission between May and November 2020. Between March and May 2020, Goldsmith was a member of the Epidemic Response Committee, a select committee that considered the government's response to the COVID-19 pandemic.

Goldsmith's budget for the National Party's 2020 election campaign was found to have several errors, some of which Goldsmith accepted. Re-elected for a fourth term as a list MP, Goldsmith lost the finance role after the election and became spokesperson for education and a member of the education and workforce committee until 2021. When Christopher Luxon became National leader in 2021, Goldsmith became justice spokesperson.

== Sixth National Government, 2023–2026 ==
Goldsmith won a fifth term as a National list MP in October 2023. Though he failed to unseat ACT leader David Seymour, he was re-elected on the National Party list.

On 27 November 2023, Goldsmith was announced as the Minister for Arts, Culture and Heritage, Minister of Justice, Minister for State Owned Enterprises and Minister for Treaty of Waitangi Negotiations in the Sixth National Government.

On 24 April 2024, Luxon appointed Goldsmith as Minister for Media and Communications during a cabinet reshuffle. Goldsmith replaced Melissa Lee, who had faced criticism for her response to Warner Bros. Discovery New Zealand's closure of Newshub.

During a cabinet reshuffle that occurred in early April 2026, Goldsmith acquired the Public Service, Digitising Government, and Pacific Peoples portfolios. Following Chris Penk's unsuccessful leadership challenge against Luxon on 12 August, Goldsmith assumed the defence, veterans, space, Government Communications Security Bureau and New Zealand Security Intelligence Service portfolios.

=== Sentencing, law and order ===
Goldsmith has repeatedly criticised what he describes as “undue leniency” in sentencing, including the use of short or non-custodial sentences for serious offences. He argues that short prison sentences undermine public confidence in the justice system and fail to deter crime, especially violent and repeat offences. He has introduced caps for sentence discounts, prevented repeat discounts for youth and remorse, and encouraged cumulative sentencing for crimes committed on bail, in custody, or on parole. He has stated that victims’ interests must be prioritised over leniency for offenders.

On 26 June 2024, Goldsmith confirmed that the Government would encourage judges to hand down "cumulative" sentences for offences committed on parole, bail or in custody. Earlier, the National-led Government had announced it would require "cumulative" sentences for such offenses but backtracked due to concerns about increasing the prison population.

On 15 July 2024, Goldsmith in his capacity as Justice Minister signed an extradition order against fugitive Internet millionaire Kim Dotcom. Dotcom had spent the past 12 years fighting against extradition to the United States where he is facing several charges of copyright infringement, money laundering and racketeering related to his Megaupload website.

On 29 June 2025, Goldsmith proposed legislation introducing higher penalties for those assaulting correctional officers and first responders. On 30 June, Goldsmith confirmed that the Government would introduce legislation creating specific offences for coward punching as part of the National Party's coalition agreement with New Zealand First.

On 1 July 2025, Goldsmith and Associate Justice Minister Nicole McKee announced several proposed tougher penalties that they claim will combat shoplifting. These included introducing infringement fees for shoplifting offences above NZ$500 and NZ$100, increasing prison terms to one year for stolen goods worth NZ$2,000 and seven years for goods worth NZ $2,000 or more, and creating a new aggravated shoplifting offence. These changes were part of National's coalition agreement with NZ First. On 3 July, Goldsmith and McKee announced that the Government would increase the maximum trespass period from two to three years, and raise the maximum fines for trespassing.

On 13 August 2025, Goldsmith announced that the Government would amend the Crimes Act 1961 to strengthen the country's human trafficking and people smuggling laws. On 15 August, Goldsmith announced the Government would introduce legislation banning protests outside people's private homes. Labour leader Hipkins indicated his party was discussing whether to support the proposed law.

In May 2026, Goldsmith introduced legislation into Parliament empowering Police to issue Move-on Orders to tackle disorderly behaviour, rough sleeping and begging. Following submissions, the Justice select committee amended the legislation to protect the freedoms of expression and movement, focus on "unreasonable begging" rather than all forms of begging, and exclude teenagers aged between 14 and 17 years and freedom campers. They also lowered penalties for breaching move-on orders such as fines. The amended bill passed into law on 18 September 2026, and came into effect on 26 October.

=== Retail crime advisory group ===
On 11 July 2024, Goldsmith and Associate Justice Minister Nicole McKee announced the formation of a new retail crime advisory group (formally, the Ministerial Advisory Group for Victims of Retail Crime) to engage with victims, workers, business owners, retail experts and advocacy groups to combat retail crime. The advisory group was allocated NZ$1.8 million a year and expected to last two years.

On 10 February 2026, Goldsmith confirmed that the retail crime advisory group would be dissolved in May 2026, four months ahead of its planned dissolution in September 2026. The group had earlier faced criticism over its costs and spending habits. Three of the group's five members had resigned due to disagreements with the group's chairman Sunny Kaushal.

=== Cultural reports ===
On 7 February 2024, Justice Minister Goldsmith announced that government funding for cultural reports would be stopped under the new National-led government. A month later, the Government passed urgent legislation ending legal aid funding for cultural reports, claiming defendants were using them to get discounts off the length of their sentence with "no benefits to the real victims of crime." The decision was criticized by lawyers and academics. Former district court judge, Dr David Harvey, said that judges would no longer have the kind of information they need to craft a proper sentence.

=== Gang insignia ===
On 25 February 2024, Justice Minister Goldsmith and Police Minister Mark Mitchell announced that the Government would introduce legislation to ban gang insignia in public places, enable Police to disperse gang gatherings, allow Courts to ban gang members from communicating for at least three years, and giving greater weight to gang membership during sentencing. Goldsmith argued that the Government needed to take action in response to a 51% increase in gang membership (over 3,000 individuals) over the past five years. On 19 September 2024, the Government passed legislation banning gang patches.

=== Hate speech ===
In early April 2024, Goldsmith ordered that work on the previous Labour Government's efforts to develop hate speech legislation protecting religious communities be halted, saying it undermined free speech. Goldsmith's decision drew criticism from Federation of Islamic Associations of New Zealand (FIANZ) President Abdur Razzaq, who argued that there needed to be limits to free speech when it crossed the lines into defamation and incitement of violence and hatred.

=== Anti-stalking legislation ===
On 10 November 2024, Goldsmith confirmed that the Government would introduce new anti-stalking legislation with new restraining and harmful digital communications orders, and prison terms for stalking. On 21 November, Goldsmith confirmed the Government would introduce legislation to give sexual abuse victims the power to decide whether convicted offenders should receive name suppression.

On 10 June 2025, Goldsmith released details of the Government's proposed Crime Legislation (Stalking and Harassment) Amendment Bill. Under the proposed legislation, stalkers could be imprisoned for committing two stalking or harassment acts within 24 months instead of three acts within 12 months. In addition, doxxing would be classified as a form of stalking and people convicted of stalking or harassment could be subject to Firearms Prohibition Orders. The bill passed its third reading on 20 December 2025. It came into effect on 26 May 2026.

=== Treaty of Waitangi issues ===
In late June 2025, Goldsmith confirmed that the Government would not progress with a Treaty of Waitangi settlement with the Māori iwi (tribe) Te Whānau-ā-Apanui due to a disagreement with the tribe over an "agree to disagree" clause stating that the tribe had never ceded sovereignty to the New Zealand Crown. During a parliamentary select committee, Goldsmith stated: "The Crown's position is clear; the Crown is sovereign. The Crown is simply the representation of the democratic will of the people of New Zealand." In response, Te Whānau-ā-Apanui said that it was open to negotiating with the Crown "but it would not seek a settlement at all costs or at the price of our rangatiratanga (chieftainship or self-determination)." The previous Labour Government had included the "agree to disagree" clause in a Deed of Settlement that it had initialled with Te Whānau-ā-Apanui in 2023.

In late June 2025, Goldsmith stated that the Government preferred signing one commercial settlement with the Māori tribe Ngāpuhi instead of having multiple settlements. Coalition partner New Zealand First MP Shane Jones had introduced a member's bill seeking to force Ngāpuhi to sign a single commercial settlement with the Government. Labour MP Peeni Henare, who is of Ngāpuhi descent, said that Goldsmith was motivated by financial considerations and said that Jones' bill would go against the "good faith" provisions of Treaty settlements. Labour leader Chris Hipkins said that the National-led government's "hostile" position towards Māori would make Treaty settlements in the next few years "very, very difficult to achieve."

As Justice Minister, Goldsmith also chaired a ministerial oversight group seeking to weaken references the Principles of the Treaty of Waitangi across 23 laws as part of the National Party's coalition agreement with New Zealand First. Other members of this oversight group included the-then Attorney-General Judith Collins, Regional Development Minister Shane Jones and Māori-Crown relations Minister Tama Potaka. During the consultation process, Goldsmith directed Justice Ministry officials not to hold regional hui (meetings) with iwi but to limit their engagement to a Crown-appointed ministerial advisory group and several government agencies. This ministerial advisory group consisting of lawyer David Cochrane as chair, iwi leader Marama Royal, lawyer John Walters and lawyer and Act Party candidate James Christmas. The proposed removal of Treaty clauses drew criticism from several Māori leaders, legal and Treaty experts including University of Auckland law professor Margaret Mutu, associate professor Andrew Erueti, Te Pāti Māori co-leader Rawiri Waititi, Northland leader Pita Tipene, Victoria University of Wellington law senior lecturer Luke Fitzmaurice-Brown and the National Iwi Chairs Forum who said they would breach and undermine the Crown's Treaty obligations to Māori. Despite the Ministry of Justice advising against the removal of Treaty clauses and the ministerial advisory group recommending tweaks to make the Treaty clauses more "descriptive," Goldsmith confirmed that the Government would proceed with plans to weaken Treaty obligations in mid-April 2026. This review is expected to affect nine laws; with five laws having Treaty principles provisions repealed, two laws having their Treaty principles provisions consolidated, and two laws having their Treaty principles provisions amended to make them "more specific." On 15 May 2026, Goldsmith confirmed the Government was seeking to amend Treaty clauses in 19 pieces of legislation.

=== Electoral amendment legislation ===
On 30 April 2025, Goldsmith confirmed that the Government would introduce legislation to reinstate a blanket ban on prisoners voting, describing it as a reversal of the previous Labour Government's "soft on crime" policy. Goldsmith said that the Cabinet had decided to disregard a High Court ruling and recommendations from both the Electoral Commission and Waitangi Tribunal that prisoners be allowed to vote. In response, the Labour, Green parties and Te Pāti Māori described the government's plan to strip prisoners of voting rights as a violation of human rights, counterproductive to rehabilitation and discriminatory against Māori people. By contrast, the Sensible Sentencing Trust's spokesperson Louise Parsons welcomed the government's announcement, saying that prisoners had lost their rights to be a part of "functioning society" due to their crimes.

On 24 July 2025, Goldsmith confirmed that the Government would introduce new electoral amendment legislation. Key provisions include closing voter enrolment 13 days before election day, setting a 12-day advance voting period, automatic enrolment updates, removing the postal requirements for enrolment. The Government also intends to ban free food, drink or entertainment within 100 metres of a voting place (subject to a NZ$10,000 fine). In addition, the Government intends to ban all prisoners from voting and will raise the donation threshold from NZ$5,000 to NZ$6,000. In response, Labour's justice spokesperson Duncan Webb expressed disagreement with the Government's plan to eliminate voter enrolment on election day as an invalid reason for restricting the number of people able to exercise their democratic right to vote.

On 17 December 2025, Parliament passed the Government's new electoral amendment legislation into law. Its provisions include banning prisoners from voting, limiting food and entertainment around polling booths, and closing voter enrolment two weeks before election day.

=== Other ===
On 14 November 2024, Goldsmith introduced new legislation that criminalised covert and other subversive activities on behalf of a foreign power "to intentionally or recklessly harm New Zealand."

On 10 February 2025, Goldsmith appointed victims advocate Ruth Money as Chief Victims' Advisor.

On 6 May 2026 Goldsmith, as Minister for Media and Communications, announced that the Government would enact legislation to disestablish the broadcasting regulator, the Broadcasting Standards Authority.

On 13 May 2026 Goldsmith, as Justice Minister, announced that the Government would amend existing climate legislation to prevent companies from being sued over damages caused by greenhouse gas emissions. The law change is expected to apply to current and future cases including iwi leader Mike Smith's 2024 lawsuit against dairy giant Fonterra and five other major emitters. According to Radio New Zealand, Justice Ministry officials had advised the Government not to intervene in Smith's court case. In response, Goldsmith acknowledged receiving a "range of advice and potential outcomes" from officials but reiterated "it is for the elected Government to determine how it moves forward."

=== Exit from Parliament ===
For the 2026 New Zealand general election, Goldsmith contested the Epsom electorate for National. He was ranked sixth on the National Party list.

On election night, the Epsom electorate preferred to retain incumbent MP David Seymour, who defeated Goldsmith by a margin of 2,044 votes. As the National Party's overall share of the vote entitled it to no more seats in Parliament than it had already gained in local electorates, Goldsmith was one of several list-only MPs who therefore were not re-elected to the next parliamentary term.

== Social and political views ==
Goldsmith voted in favour of legalising same-sex marriage in 2012 and 2013 and in favour of prohibiting conversion therapy in 2022. He opposed the End of Life Choice Bill in 2017 and 2019 and voted for the Abortion Legislation Bill in 2019 but not 2020.

Goldsmith has stated that he would vote against the legalisation of cannabis at the 2020 referendum. He believes New Zealand should wait and observe the effects of cannabis legalisation in Canada before making a decision.

In June 2021, Goldsmith attracted controversy for stating that colonisation had been "on balance" good for Māori because it had led to the creation of New Zealand. He believes that New Zealand's reconnection with the rest of the world following isolation for centuries was always going to be a "traumatic experience". Goldsmith refused to apologise for the comments, calling himself "a proud New Zealander."

== Bibliography ==
- Goldsmith, Paul (2002). John Banks: A Biography. Penguin Books. ISBN 0-14-301819-1.
- Goldsmith, Paul (2003). The Rise and Fall of Te Hemara Tauhia. Raupo Publishing. ISBN 0-7-90009-056.
- Goldsmith, Paul (2005). Brash: a biography. Penguin Books. ISBN 0-14-301967-8.
- Goldsmith, Paul; Bassett, Michael (2007). The Myers. Auckland: David Ling. ISBN 9781877378133.
- Goldsmith, Paul (2008). We Won, You Lost, Eat That!: A Political History of Tax in New Zealand Since 1840. David Ling Publishing. ISBN 978-1-877378-22-5.
- Goldsmith, Paul (2008). Stress & Enterprise: the Career of Richard Izard. David Ling Publishing. ISBN 978-1-87737-821-8.
- Goldsmith, Paul; Bassett, Michael (2008). Puketutu and its People. David Ling Publishing. ISBN 978-1-87737-825-6.
- Goldsmith, Paul (2009). Fletchers: A Centennial History of Fletcher Building. David Ling Publishing. ISBN 978-1-877378-35-5.
- Goldsmith, Paul (2012). Serious Fun: The Life and Times of Alan Gibbs. Penguin Books New Zealand. ISBN 978-1-86979-930-4.
- Goldsmith, Paul (2013). Legend: From Electric Fences to Global Success: The Sir William Gallagher Story. Penguin Books New Zealand. ISBN 978-1-77553-337-5.

== Notes ==
Political offices
Preceded by Craig Foss	Minister of Commerce and Consumer Affairs; 2014–2016	Succeeded by Jacqui Dean
Preceded by Duncan Webb	Minister for State Owned Enterprises; 2023–2025	Succeeded by Simeon Brown
Preceded by Ginny Andersen	Minister of Justice; 2023–present	Incumbent
Preceded by Andrew Little	Minister for Treaty of Waitangi Negotiations; 2023–present	Incumbent
Preceded by Carmel Sepuloni	Minister for Arts, Culture and Heritage; 2023–present	Incumbent
Preceded by Melissa Lee	Minister for Media and Communications; 2024–present	Incumbent
Preceded by Chris Penk	Minister for Veterans; 2026–present	Incumbent
Preceded by Chris Penk	Minister of Defence; 2026–present	Incumbent
Preceded by Chris Penk	Minister Responsible for the Government Communications Security Bureau; 2026–present	Incumbent
Preceded by Chris Penk	Minister Responsible for the New Zealand Security Intelligence Service; 2026–present	Incumbent
Preceded by Chris Penk	Minister for Space; 2026–present	Incumbent
