= Minister for Arts, Culture and Heritage =

New Zealand minister of the Crown

- Coat of arms of New Zealand

- Flag of New Zealand

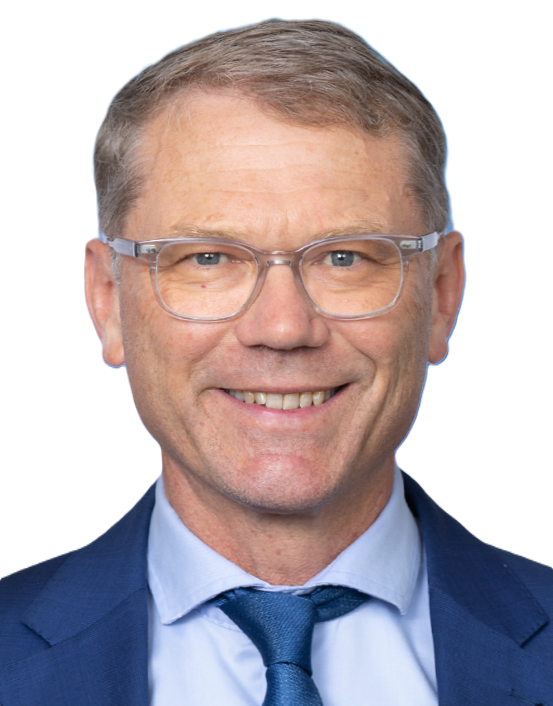
- Incumbent; Paul Goldsmith since 27 November 2023
- Ministry for Culture and Heritage
- Style: The Honourable
- Member of: Cabinet of New Zealand; Executive Council
- Reports to: Prime Minister of New Zealand
- Appointer: Governor-General of New Zealand
- Term length: at his pleasure
- Precursor: Minister for Culture and Heritage; Minister for Cultural Affairs; Minister for Arts and Culture; Minister for the Arts
- Formation: 12 December 1975
- First holder: Allan Highet
- Salary: $288,900
- Website: www.beehive.govt.nz

The Minister for Arts, Culture and Heritage is a minister in the New Zealand Government with responsibility for arts, culture, heritage, and broadcasting, and is in charge of the Ministry for Culture and Heritage. The position was established in 1975 as Minister for the Arts.

The present Minister is Paul Goldsmith.

== History ==
The Third National Government of New Zealand established a ministerial portfolio with responsibility for the arts at its election in 1975. This reflected a growing interest of the Government in the cultural sector. The name of the portfolio changed to "Minister for Arts and Culture" in 1987. During this period, the portfolio was serviced by the Department of Internal Affairs.

A separate portfolio, Minister responsible for the New Zealand Symphony Orchestra, was established in 1987. This was held first by Jonathan Hunt (24 August 1987 – 9 February 1990) and subsequently by Margaret Austin (also the Minister for Arts and Culture; 9 February 1990 – 2 November 1990) before being subsumed back into the responsibilities of the Minister for Arts and Culture.

A standalone agency, the Ministry for Cultural Affairs, was established by the Fourth National Government in 1991, which necessitated the change of title to "Minister for Cultural Affairs." With the creation of the Ministry for Culture and Heritage in 1999, which brought together cultural and heritage responsibilities in the same agency, the portfolio title changed to match its department. The present name was adopted in November 1999 at the election of the Fifth Labour Government.

== List of ministers ==
Key

National Labour

No.	Name	Portrait	Term of office		Prime Minister
As Minister for the Arts
1	Allan Highet		12 December 1975	26 July 1984	Muldoon
2	Peter Tapsell		26 July 1984	24 August 1987	Lange
As Minister for Arts and Culture
3	Michael Bassett		24 August 1987	9 February 1990	Lange
3	Michael Bassett		24 August 1987	9 February 1990	Palmer
4	Margaret Austin		9 February 1990	2 November 1990	Palmer
4	Margaret Austin		9 February 1990	2 November 1990	Moore
5	Doug Graham		2 November 1990	3 October 1991	Bolger
As Minister for Cultural Affairs
(5)	Doug Graham		3 October 1991	16 December 1996	Bolger
6	Christine Fletcher		16 December 1996	12 September 1997	Bolger
7	Simon Upton		12 September 1997	31 August 1998	Bolger
7	Simon Upton		12 September 1997	31 August 1998	Shipley
8	Marie Hasler		31 August 1998	1 September 1999	Shipley
As Minister for Culture and Heritage
(8)	Marie Hasler		1 September 1999	27 November 1999	Shipley
As Minister for Arts, Culture and Heritage
9	Helen Clark		27 November 1999	19 November 2008	Clark
10	Chris Finlayson		19 November 2008	8 October 2014	Key
11	Maggie Barry		8 October 2014	26 October 2017	Key
11	Maggie Barry		8 October 2014	26 October 2017	English
12	Jacinda Ardern		26 October 2017	6 November 2020	Ardern
13	Carmel Sepuloni		6 November 2020	27 November 2023	Ardern
13	Carmel Sepuloni		6 November 2020	27 November 2023	Hipkins
14	Paul Goldsmith		27 November 2023	present	Luxon

== List of associate ministers ==
Associate Ministers for Arts, Culture and Heritage have been appointed on occasion since 1999. Their role is to assist the portfolio minister in carrying out tasks related to the portfolio. They may exercise statutory powers or functions delegated on behalf of the minister under the Constitution Act 1986.

No.	Name	Portrait	Term of office		Minister
1	Judith Tizard		10 December 1999	19 October 2008	Clark
2	Mahara Okeroa		19 October 2005	19 October 2008	Clark
3	Carmel Sepuloni		26 October 2017	6 November 2020	Ardern
4	Grant Robertson		26 October 2017	6 November 2020	Ardern
5	Jacinda Ardern		6 November 2020	25 January 2023	Sepuloni
6	Kiri Allan		6 November 2020	1 February 2023	Sepuloni
7	Willow-Jean Prime		1 February 2023	27 November 2023	Sepuloni
