= Minister of Defence (New Zealand) =

New Zealand minister of the Crown

- Coat of arms of New Zealand

- Flag of New Zealand

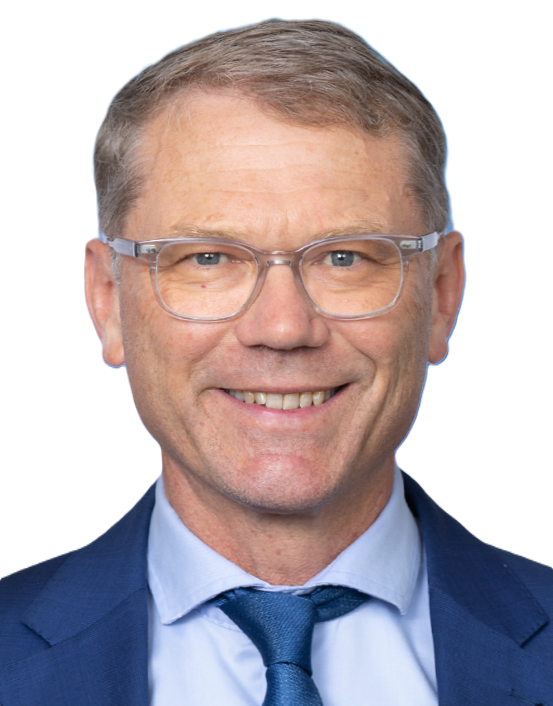
- Incumbent; Paul Goldsmith since 13 August 2026
- Ministry of Defence
- Style: The Honourable
- Member of: Cabinet of New Zealand; Executive Council
- Reports to: Prime Minister of New Zealand
- Appointer: Governor-General of New Zealand
- Term length: At His Majesty's pleasure
- Formation: 22 July 1862
- First holder: Reader Wood
- Salary: $288,900
- Website: www.beehive.govt.nz

The minister of defence is a minister in the New Zealand Government with responsibility for the New Zealand Defence Force and the Ministry of Defence.

The present minister is Paul Goldsmith, a member of the National Party.

== History ==
Initially, military affairs in New Zealand were controlled by the British-appointed governor, without input from the New Zealand Parliament, which was only established in 1853. There was no minister of defence as such, as the governor retained control over all armed forces in the colony. However, senior military officers did serve as members of the Executive Council. Three such appointments were made: Lieutenant Colonel Robert Wynyard, Major General Thomas Simson Pratt, and Lieutenant General Duncan Alexander Cameron.

In 1863, under the premiership of Alfred Domett, a minister for colonial defence was appointed. Reader Wood, a former militia officer, became the first minister. This post continued to exist with only brief interruption until Edward Stafford's short-lived premiership of 1872, in which no defence minister was appointed. As a consequence of the New Zealand Wars, the defence portfolio was considered closely linked to the post of Minister of Native Affairs — on occasion, the latter post was formally titled "Minister of Native Affairs and Defence". It was not until the premiership of Robert Stout in 1884 that a separate minister of defence was formally appointed, and not until 1887 that the post was given to someone who was not simultaneously minister of native affairs. Until 1896 the responsibility for the New Zealand Police rested with the minister of defence before being allocated to the minister of justice instead.

During World War II, the post was supplemented by several others — a minister of national service (conscription), a minister of supply and munitions, a minister in charge of war expenditure, and a minister of armed forces and war co-ordination. All were part of the special War Cabinet, but only the first was a member of the regular domestic Cabinet.

== List of defence ministers ==
Key

Independent Liberal Reform United Labour National NZ First

No.	Name	Portrait	Term of Office		Prime Minister
1	Reader Wood		22 July 1862	30 October 1863	Domett
2	Harry Atkinson		24 November 1864	16 October 1865	Weld
3	Theodore Haultain		31 October 1865	28 June 1869	Stafford
4	Donald McLean		28 June 1869	10 September 1872	Fox
1872–1884: No separate appointments, although John Bryce twice held office as "Minister of Native Affairs and Defence"; broken by William Rolleston from 4 February to 19 October 1881
5	John Ballance		16 July 1884	8 October 1887	Stout
6	Thomas Fergus		8 October 1884	17 October 1889	Atkinson
7	William Russell		17 October 1889	24 January 1891	Atkinson
8	Richard Seddon		24 January 1891	22 June 1896	Ballance
8	Richard Seddon		24 January 1891	22 June 1896	Seddon
9	Thomas Thompson		22 June 1896	23 January 1900	Seddon
(8)	Richard Seddon		23 January 1900	10 June 1906	Seddon
10	Albert Pitt		21 June 1906	18 November 1906	Hall-Jones
10	Albert Pitt		21 June 1906	18 November 1906	Ward
11	Joseph Ward		23 November 1906	28 March 1912	Ward
12	Arthur Myers		28 March 1912	10 July 1912	Mackenzie
13	James Allen		10 July 1912	28 April 1920	Massey
14	Heaton Rhodes		21 July 1920	18 January 1926	Massey
14	Heaton Rhodes		21 July 1920	18 January 1926	Bell
14	Heaton Rhodes		21 July 1920	18 January 1926	Coates
15	Frank Rolleston		18 January 1926	26 November 1928	Coates
16	William Downie Stewart Jr		28 November 1928	10 December 1928	Coates
17	Thomas Wilford		10 December 1928	10 December 1929	Ward
18	John Cobbe		10 December 1929	6 December 1935	Ward
18	John Cobbe		10 December 1929	6 December 1935	Forbes
19	Fred Jones		6 December 1935	13 December 1949	Savage
19	Fred Jones		6 December 1935	13 December 1949	Fraser
20	Tom Macdonald		13 December 1949	26 September 1957	Holland
21	Dean Eyre		26 September 1957	12 December 1957	Holyoake
22	Phil Connolly		12 December 1957	12 December 1960	Nash
(21)	Dean Eyre		12 December 1960	12 December 1966	Holyoake
23	David Thomson		12 December 1966	9 February 1972	Holyoake
24	Allan McCready		9 February 1972	8 December 1972	Marshall
25	Arthur Faulkner		8 December 1972	10 September 1974	Kirk
26	Bill Fraser		10 September 1974	12 December 1975	Rowling
(24)	Allan McCready		12 December 1975	13 December 1978	Muldoon
27	Frank Gill		13 December 1978	21 August 1980	Muldoon
(23)	David Thomson		28 August 1980	26 July 1984	Muldoon
28	Frank O'Flynn		26 July 1984	24 July 1987	Lange
29	Bob Tizard		24 July 1987	9 February 1990	Lange
29	Bob Tizard		24 July 1987	9 February 1990	Palmer
30	Peter Tapsell		9 February 1990	2 November 1990	Palmer
30	Peter Tapsell		9 February 1990	2 November 1990	Moore
31	Warren Cooper		2 November 1990	1 March 1996	Bolger
32	Paul East		1 March 1996	5 December 1997	Bolger
33	Max Bradford		5 December 1997	10 December 1999	Shipley
34	Mark Burton		10 December 1999	12 October 2005	Clark
35	Phil Goff		12 October 2005	19 November 2008	Clark
36	Wayne Mapp		19 November 2008	14 December 2011	Key
37	Jonathan Coleman		14 December 2011	6 October 2014	Key
38	Gerry Brownlee		6 October 2014	2 May 2017	Key
38	Gerry Brownlee		6 October 2014	2 May 2017	English
39	Mark Mitchell		2 May 2017	26 October 2017	English
40	Ron Mark		26 October 2017	6 November 2020	Ardern
41	Peeni Henare		6 November 2020	1 February 2023	Ardern
41	Peeni Henare		6 November 2020	1 February 2023	Hipkins
42	Andrew Little		1 February 2023	27 November 2023	Hipkins
43	Judith Collins		27 November 2023	2 April 2026	Luxon
44	Chris Penk		7 April 2026	13 August 2026	Luxon
45	Paul Goldsmith		13 August 2026	Incumbent	Luxon

== See also ==
- Ministry of Defence (New Zealand)
- Defence Diplomacy
