= Minister for Mental Health (New Zealand) =

- Coat of arms of New Zealand

- Flag of New Zealand

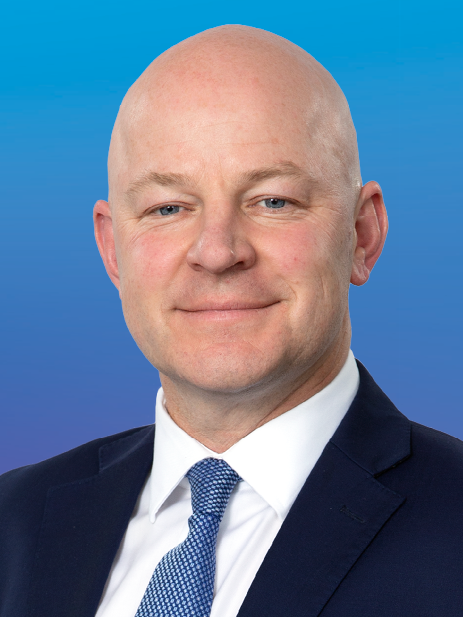
- Incumbent; Matt Doocey since 27 November 2023
- Style: The Honourable
- Member of: Cabinet of New Zealand; Executive Council
- Reports to: Prime Minister of New Zealand
- Appointer: Governor-General of New Zealand
- Term length: At His Majesty's pleasure
- Formation: 27 November 2023
- First holder: Matt Doocey

The Minister for Mental Health is a minister in the government of New Zealand with the responsibility of managing mental health.

The current Minister for Mental Health is Matt Doocey.

== History ==
Doocey first pitched the idea of a minister of mental health in 2017 to Bill English, who was the National leader at the time. In 2023 it was decided that if National won the 2023 general election, he would become the minister for mental health. National did win the 2023 general election, and Doocey became the first minister for mental health.

== List of ministers for mental health ==
The following ministers have held the office of Minister for Mental Health.

Key

National

No.	Name	Portrait	Term of office		Prime Minister
1	Matt Doocey		27 November 2023	Incumbent	Luxon
