= Cameron Brewer =

New Zealand politician

The Honourable Cameron Brewer MP
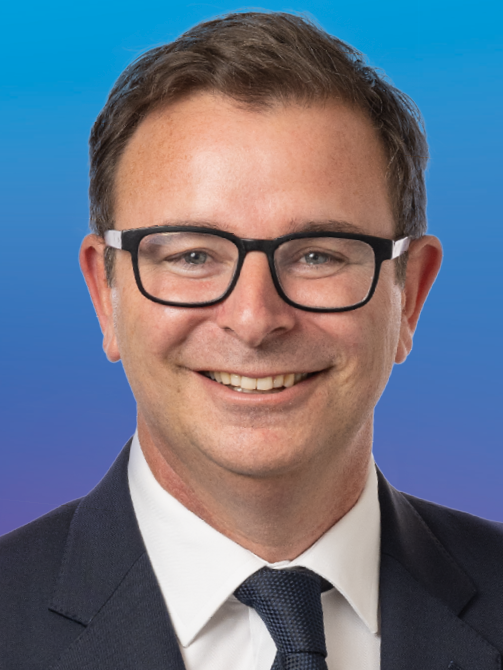
- Brewer in 2023

19th Minister of Commerce and Consumer Affairs
- Incumbent
- Assumed office 7 April 2026
- Prime Minister: Christopher Luxon
- Preceded by: Scott Simpson

Minister for Small Business and Manufacturing
- Incumbent
- Assumed office 7 April 2026
- Prime Minister: Christopher Luxon

Member of Parliament for Upper Harbour
- Incumbent
- Assumed office 14 October 2023
- Preceded by: Vanushi Walters
- Majority: 11,192

Ōrākei ward councillor
- In office 9 October 2010 – 8 October 2016
- Preceded by: Office established
- Succeeded by: Desley Simpson

Personal details
- Born: Cameron Eric Brewer; 8 March 1973 (age 53) Hāwera, New Zealand
- Party: New Zealand National Party
- Children: 3
- Education: Massey University (BA)
- Occupation: Member of Parliament

Cameron Eric Brewer (born 8 March 1973) is a New Zealand politician and former journalist.

A member of the National Party, Brewer has been a Member of Parliament in the House of Representatives for Upper Harbour since 2023. He was previously the Ōrākei ward representative on Auckland Council from 2010 to 2016. Following a cabinet reshuffle in 2026, he became the Minister of Commerce and Consumer Affairs, the Minister for Small Business and Manufacturing and the associate Minister of Immigration.

== Early life and career ==
Born in Hāwera on 8 March 1973, Brewer attended Wanganui Collegiate School and Massey University where he completed a Bachelor of Arts in history and sociology in 1994. He was president of the students' association of Western Institute of Technology, where he studied journalism and edited the student publication.

In early 1996 he founded and edited Dunedin-based community newspaper Inside Otago before selling it in late 1998. He moved to Wellington and worked as a writer and researcher for the National Party and as a press secretary first to the Leader of the Opposition, Jenny Shipley, and later to the leader of ACT New Zealand, Rodney Hide. From 2002 to 2004 Brewer was communications advisor to the Mayor of Auckland City, John Banks.

Between 2005 and 2010 he was the chief executive of the Newmarket Business Association.

== Auckland Council ==
Auckland Council
Years	Ward	Affiliation
2010–2013	Ōrākei	Independent
2013–2016	Ōrākei	Independent

In the 2010 Auckland Council elections Brewer was elected from the Ōrākei ward as an Independent with a 7,000 vote margin over Citizens & Ratepayers (C&R) deputy leader Doug Armstrong. Brewer's decision to contest the election as a right-wing independent was labelled as a "betrayal" by C&R members while the result was considered a humiliation for C&R in its "traditional heartland".

In his first term, Brewer was chair of Auckland Council's Business Advisory Forum, chair of the Planning and Urban Design Panel, and deputy chair of the Economic Development Forum. He was considered a potential candidate for the Mayor of Auckland in 2013, but did not run. Instead he was re-elected as a councillor unopposed. Brewer was an opponent of mayor Len Brown and criticised him for not declaring gifts. Brewer himself failed to declare gifts and hospitality in 2013. He did not contest a third term on the council in 2016.

In October 2016 Brewer was elected to the Rodney Local Board in the Kumeu subdivision. He had stood as part of the Rodney First ticket. During the term, he chaired the board's transport, infrastructure and environment committee. He retired from local politics in 2019 to focus on running his communications firm.

== Member of Parliament ==
New Zealand Parliament
Years	Term	Electorate	List	Party
2023–2026	54th	Upper Harbour	62	National
2026–present	55th	Upper Harbour	19	National

Brewer has been a member of the National Party since 1996. The New Zealand Herald reported in 2022 he had long held ambitions to become a member of Parliament. He declined to seek National's candidacy in the Tāmaki electorate in 2011 and also ruled out standing for the ACT Party. He also declined to seek the candidacy in Helensville in 2017.

In April 2023, Brewer was announced as the National Party's candidate in the Upper Harbour electorate for the 2023 general election. He defeated first-term incumbent Vanushi Walters, New Zealand's first Sri Lankan-born MP, with a margin of 11,192. After an election night celebration, Brewer was accused of making an inappropriate comment in his speech, declaring that his win was a victory for "stale, pale, males." He later apologised, saying it was “a poor attempt at humour”.

In his first term in Parliament, Brewer served as deputy chair of the governance and administration committee and as a member of the justice committee from December 2023 to January 2025. On 29 January 2025, he was appointed as chair of the finance and expenditure committee. A private member's bill in his name, the Life Jackets for Children and Young Persons Bill, was introduced in April 2025 and seeks to require all recreational boat users aged 15 and under to wear a life jacket.

Following a cabinet reshuffle on 2 April 2026, Brewer became Minister of Commerce and Consumer Affairs, Minister for Small Business and Manufacturing and associate minister of immigration.

During the 2026 New Zealand general election, Brewer contested the Upper Harbour electorate for National. He was ranked 19th on the National Party list. On 7 November, Brewer retained Upper Harbour by a margin of 8,967 votes based on preliminary results.

== Personal life ==
Brewer has three children from two past marriages.

New Zealand Parliament
Preceded by Vanushi Walters	Member of Parliament for Upper Harbour; 2023–present	Incumbent
