= 54th New Zealand Parliament =

New Zealand parliamentary term from 2023 to 2026

54th Parliament of New Zealand
←	53rd Parliament	55th Parliament	→
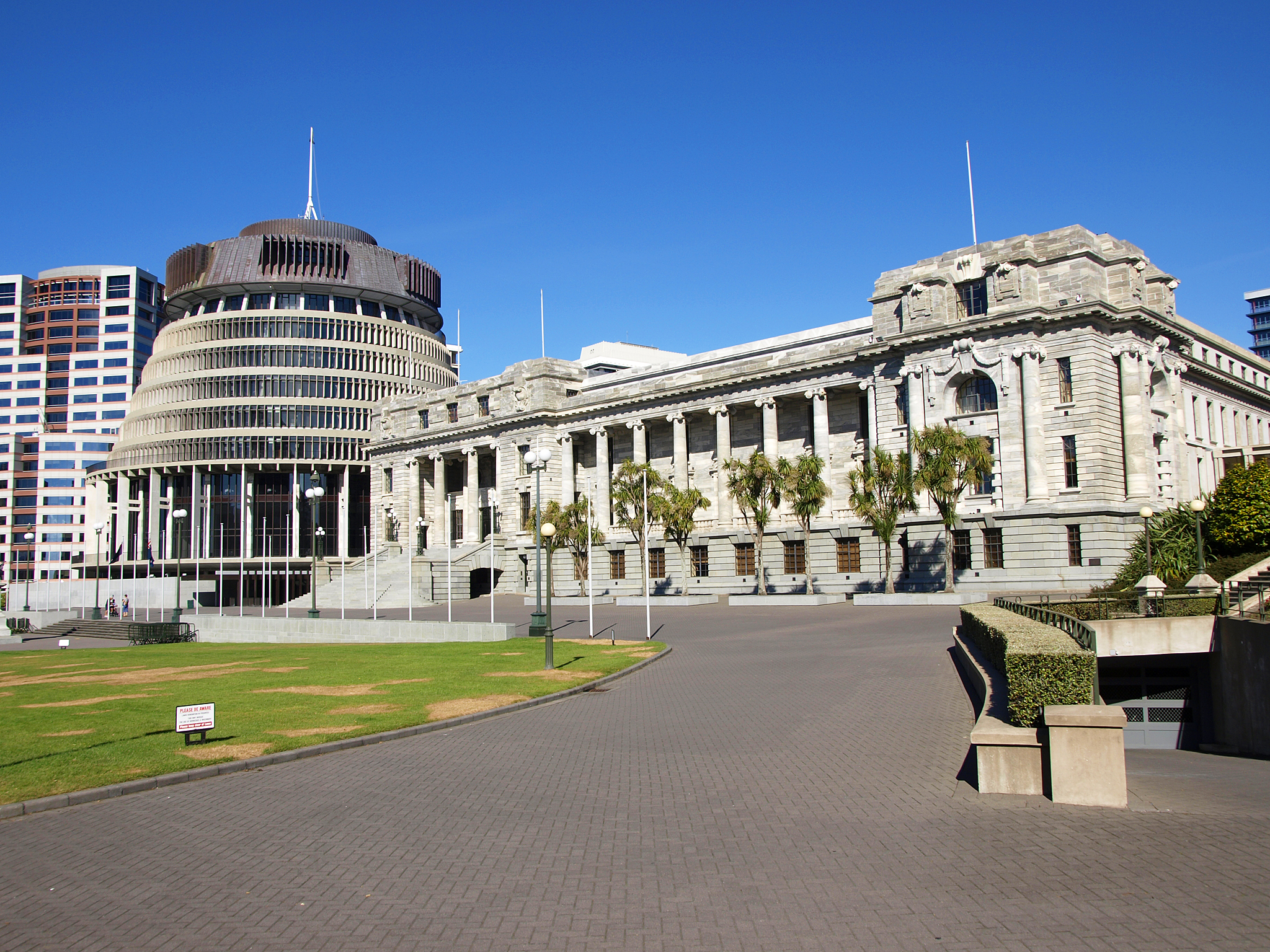
- Parliament House, Wellington

Overview
- Legislative body: New Zealand Parliament
- Term: 5 December 2023 – 1 October 2026
- Election: 2023 general election
- Government: Sixth National Government
- Website: www.parliament.nz

House of Representatives
- Members: 122
- Speaker of the House: Gerry Brownlee
- Leader of the House: Louise Upston — Chris Bishop until 7 April 2026
- Prime Minister: Christopher Luxon
- Leader of the Opposition: Chris Hipkins

Sovereign
- Monarch: Charles III
- Governor-General: Cindy Kiro

Terms of the
New Zealand Parliament

1st | 2nd | 3rd | 4th | 5th
6th | 7th | 8th | 9th | 10th
11th | 12th | 13th | 14th | 15th
16th | 17th | 18th | 19th | 20th
21st | 22nd | 23rd | 24th | 25th
26th | 27th | 28th | 29th | 30th
31st | 32nd | 33rd | 34th | 35th
36th | 37th | 38th | 39th | 40th
41st | 42nd | 43rd | 44th | 45th
46th | 47th | 48th | 49th | 50th
51st | 52nd | 53rd | 54th | 55th

The 54th New Zealand Parliament was a meeting of the legislature in New Zealand. It opened on 5 December 2023 following the 14 October 2023 general election, and dissolved on 1 October 2026 prior to the 2026 general election.

The Parliament was elected using a mixed-member proportional representation (MMP) voting system. MPs represent 72 geographical electorates: 16 in the South Island, 49 in the North Island and 7 Māori electorates. The Electoral Act 1993 provides for the remaining seats to be elected from party lists using the Sainte-Laguë method to realise proportionality to an expected total of at least 120 MPs.

Final results of the election determined that there are 123 members of Parliament, rather than the usual 120. 122 members were elected in the general election (there is an overhang of two members for Te Pāti Māori). Due to the death of a candidate between the close of nominations and election day, Port Waikato did not elect a representative and an additional list MP was elected to ensure Parliament would have at least 120 members. The 72nd electorate MP, and 123rd MP overall, was elected in the Port Waikato by-election on 25 November 2023. In May 2026 following the appointment of Judith Collins as President of the New Zealand Law Commission, she resigned her electorate seat which lowered the number of MPs to 122.

Members in the 54th Parliament represent six political parties: National, ACT, and New Zealand First, in government; and Labour, Green, and Te Pāti Māori, in opposition. Christopher Luxon of the National Party formed a coalition government with ACT and New Zealand First and was sworn in as prime minister on 27 November 2023.

== Background ==
=== 2023 general election ===
The 2023 general election was held on 14 October. The opposition National Party won 48 seats in the election, an increase of 14 seats. The ruling Labour Party was reduced to 34 seats after losing a total of 28 seats. The Green Party, Labour's cooperation partner, got 15 seats, a rise of 6. The ACT Party increased its seat count by one. Te Pāti Māori took five Maori seats from Labour, totaling six seats, one more than their party vote entitled them to, giving parliament a three-seat overhang. After being voted out in the 2020 New Zealand general election, New Zealand First returned to parliament, earning eight seats.

=== Government formation ===
Following the general election, the National Party required support from the ACT Party and New Zealand First to command the confidence of the House. Negotiations between the three parties took place after the official results were announced on 3 November. After three weeks of negotiations, Christopher Luxon announced the formation of a coalition government with ACT and New Zealand First on 24 November. On 27 November, Luxon was sworn in as prime minister by Governor-General Dame Cindy Kiro.

== Parliamentary term ==
The final results of the election were announced on 3 November and the writ for the 2023 election was returned on 16 November 2023. Under section 19 of Constitution Act 1986, Parliament must meet no later than six weeks after this date; on 29 November 2023, following the new government's first Cabinet meeting, Leader of the House Chris Bishop confirmed that the Commission Opening and State Opening of Parliament would take place on 5 and 6 December 2023, respectively.

=== Timeline ===
- 16 November 2023 – The writ for election is returned; officially declaring all elected members of the 54th Parliament.
- 24 November 2023 – A coalition government is formed between National, ACT, and NZ First.
- 27 November 2023 – Christopher Luxon is sworn in as Prime Minister of New Zealand.
- 5 December 2023 – The Governor-General issued the Commission of Opening of Parliament. The House elects Gerry Brownlee as Speaker.
- 6 December 2023 – State Opening of Parliament
- 30 May 2024 – Budget 2024 is delivered to Parliament.
- 17–21 June 2024 – Parliament holds its first ever "scrutiny week," which allows select committees to scrutinise government and public sector spending plans.
- 2–6 December 2024 – Parliament held its second scrutiny week.
- 22 May 2025 – Budget 2025 is delivered to Parliament.
- 16–20 June 2025 – Scrutiny week.
- 26 June–15 July 2025 – Parliament adjourns for two weeks following the death of Takutai Tarsh Kemp, the Te Pāti Māori Member of Parliament for Tāmaki Makaurau.
- 1–5 December 2025 – Scrutiny week
- 28 May 2026 – Budget 2026 is delivered to Parliament.
- 15–19 June 2026 – Scrutiny week.
- 23 September – The 54th Parliament held its final legislative seating prior to the 2026 New Zealand general election.
- 1 October 2026 – The 54th Parliament is dissolved, leading up to the 2026 general election held on 7 November 2026.

=== Major legislation ===
==== 2023–2024 ====
In December 2023, the Government repealed several of the previous Labour Government's legislation and policies including the Reserve Bank of New Zealand's dual mandate, the Fair Pay Agreements Act 2022, the Clean Car Discount programme, the Natural and Built Environment Act 2023 and the Spatial Planning Act 2023. On 21 December, the Government passed legislation reinstating 90-day work trials. In February 2024, the Government repealed the Three Waters reform programme, Smokefree Environments and Regulated Products (Smoked Tobacco) Amendment Act 2022 and disestablished Te Aka Whai Ora (the Māori Health Authority) under urgency.

In late March 2024, the Government passed major tax legislation restoring interest deductibility for residential investment property, reducing the bright-line test for residential property to two years, and eliminating depreciation deductions for commercial and industrial buildings. The Government also passed legislation requiring electric cars and plug-in hybrids to pay road user charges. In April 2024, the Government passed the legislation allowing 11 pseudoephedrine cold and flu medicines to be sold without prescriptions from June 2024.

In late July 2024, the Government passed legislation reinstating the referendum requirement for Māori wards and constituencies in local councils. Councils that had previously established a Māori ward without a referendum are now required to hold a binding poll alongside the 2025 New Zealand local elections or to disestablish them. In late August 2024, the Government passed legislation requiring local councils to develop plans for delivering drinking water, wastewater and stormwater services as part of its "Local Water Done Well" programme.

In September 2024, Parliament passed a private member's bill amending the Fair Trading Act 1986 to ensure that gift cards have a minimum expiry date of three years from their initial purchase. The bill was supported by all parties except ACT. In mid October 2024, Parliament passed Deborah Russell's private member's bill exempting victims of domestic violence from waiting a mandatory two years to seek a divorce. In late October 2024, National-led government passed the legislation easing the "regulatory burden" on the country's farming, mining and other primary industries. In late November 2024, Parliament with cross-party support passed legislation restoring New Zealand citizenship to people born in Samoa between 1924 and 1949, who had been deprived of New Zealand citizenship in 1982.

On 10 December 2024, Parliament passed urgent legislation banning greyhound dogs from being killed while the Government took action to end greyhound racing in New Zealand by July 2026. On 12 December, Parliament passed the government's legislation introducing its pet bonds for tenants and reinstating 90 day no-cause evictions. On 13 December, Parliament passed the government's legislation reinstating three-strikes laws. On 17 December, the Government's contentious Fast-track Approvals Act 2024 passed into law.

==== 2025 ====
On 30 January 2025, Parliament passed the Taranaki Maunga Collective Redress Bill, which conferred legal personhood on Mount Taranaki. The New Zealand Crown also apologised to eight Māori iwi for confiscating Mount Taranaki and 1.2 million acres of Māori lands in the Taranaki region. In addition, Mount Egmont would cease to be an official name for Mt Taranaki.

On 12 March, Parliament passed Labour MP Camilla Belich's Crimes (Theft By Employer) Amendment Bill, clarifying that an employer withholding an employee's wages is theft. While the bill was opposed by National and ACT (60 votes), it passed with the support of the Labour, Green, Māori and New Zealand First parties (63 votes). The bill received royal assent on 13 March.

On 7 May, Parliament passed the Equal Pay Amendment Act 2025 under urgency, raising the threshold for making pay equity claims. As a result, 33 claims representing thousands of workers have to be dropped and refiled. The bill was supported by the governing coalition but opposed by all opposition parties. On 15 May, Parliament passed legislation formalising a Treaty of Waitangi settlement with Ngāti Ranginui; which included NZ$38 million in financial restitution and returning 15 sites of historical significance to the tribe.

On 26 June, Parliament passed legislation designating the Independent Children's Monitor as a stand-alone independent Crown entity, disestablishing the Children and Young People's Commission and reinstating the Children's Commissioner; effective 1 August 2025. The bill was supported by all parties except Te Pāti Māori. On 31 July, Parliament passed legislation repealing a 2018 law limiting new oil and gas exploration permits off the coast of Taranaki along party lines.

On 19 August, the Government passed two laws, the Local Government (Water Services) Bill and the Local Government (Water Services) (Repeals and Amendments) Bill, entrenching its Local Water Done Well framework. On 20 August, Parliament passed Labour MP Camilla Belich's bill banning employers from imposing gag orders on workers talking about their salaries passed into law with the support of the Green, Māori, and National parties. That same day, Labour MP Tracey McLellan's bill extending the range of protections for those giving evidence of sexual assaults or family harm in the Family Court passed into law with unanimous support.

On 17 September, Parliament passed urgent legislation preventing convicted abusers from adopting children from other countries. On 14 October, Parliament passed legislation allowing radio and television stations to broadcast advertisements on Christmas Day, Good Friday, Easter Sunday and Anzac Day. The legislation was supported by the National, Labour and ACT parties but was opposed by the Greens, New Zealand First and Te Pāti Māori. On 22 October, Parliament passed the government's legislation limiting the threshold for Māori foreshore and seabed claims. Opposition parties vowed to repeal the legislation if they formed the next government.

On 5 November, Parliament passed legislation formalizing a Treaty of Waitangi settlement with Ngāti Pāoa. The settlement includes NZ$23.5 million in financial compensation, recognising 12 "culturally significant" sites, and a formal Crown apology for historical land alienation. On 13 November, ACT leader and Deputy Prime Minister David Seymour's contentious Regulatory Standards Act 2025 passed its third reading in Parliament, becoming law.

On 11 December, Parliament passed two urgent government laws delaying a ban on farrowing crates by ten years and legislation amending the Fast-track Approvals Act 2024. On 17 December, Parliament passed electoral amendment legislation reducing the timeframe for voter registration to two weeks before election day, banning prisoners from voting and allowing larger anonymous donations. That same day, Parliament passed a bill implementing the Nelson Tenths settlement between the Te Tau Ihu Māori and the New Zealand Crown.

==== 2026 ====
On 29 January, Parliament passed legislation formalising the Crown's Treaty settlement with Ngāti Hāua; which includes NZ$19 million worth of financial redress and the return of 64 culturally-significant sites. On 17 February, Parliament passed the Government's controversial Employment Relations Amendment Act 2026 which tightened the criteria for personal grievances claims, created a "gateway test" for differentiating between employees and contractors, ended payouts for employees dismissed for "serious misconduct," and eliminated a 30-day rule extending automatic collective agreement terms to new employees. That same week, Parliament passed legislation extending Anzac Day recognition to all servicemen who had served New Zealand in conflicts, peacekeeping operations and other deployments.

In mid-February 2026, Minister for Infrastructure Chris Bishop released the country's first "National Infrastructure Plan." This plan outlines 16 recommendations and 10 priorities for the next decade. Bishop said that the Government would be seeking cross-party support across Parliament for the plan. By mid-June 2026, the opposition Labour and Green parties agreed to support the bulk of the National Infrastructure Plan's provisions. The Government agreed to implement 13 of the 16 recommendations and four further actions including reviewing the land transport funding system, introducing legislation requiring government departments and Crown entities to develop long-term investment and asset management plans, requiring infrastructure provides to maintain updated data in the National Infrastructure Network and developing a professional standard for public sector leadership.

On 1 April 2026, Parliament passed Labour MP Kieran McAnulty's member's bill allowing more premises open on Good Friday, Anzac Day and Christmas Day to sell alcohol under normal license conditions, with the exception of liquors stores and supermarkets. In early April 2026, Parliament passed legislation reducing the housing intensification target in Auckland by 32.5 percent from 2 million to 1.4 million homes. On 2 April, Parliament passed legislation creating the legislative framework for phasing out greyhound racing in New Zealand by 1 August 2026 including creating a transitional agency and rehoming the dogs. On 28 April, Parliament passed the Government's controversial legislation legalising online casinos along party lines.

On 13 May, Parliament passed legislation entrenching three Treaty settlements with three Hauraki iwi (tribes): Ngāti Hei, Ngāti Tara Tokanui and Ngāti Rāhiri Tumutumu. On 27 May, Parliament passed the Government's legislation disestablishing the Ministry for the Environment and transferring its statutory functions to the new Ministry for Cities, Environment, Regions and Transport (MCERT), effective 1 July. On 29 May, Parliament passed the Government's legislation under urgency allowing the Ministry of Social Development to use artificial intelligence to make decisions regarding people's welfare benefits.

On 1 July, Parliament passed the Government's contentious legislation reversing several 2015 workplace safety legislative changes that were passed following the 2010 Pike River Mine disaster. On 28 July, Parliament passed the Arms Act 2026, which replaced the Arms Act 1983 as the regulatory framework for firearms in New Zealand. On 29 July, Parliament passed the Government's Employment Leave Bill replacing the Holiday Act. The new law bases employees' annual and sick leave in direct proportion to their standard work hours. On 30 July, Parliament passed the English Language Act 2026, which designated the English language as one of New Zealand's three official languages.

On 6 August, Parliament passed the Crimes Amendment Bill, which amended the Crimes Act 1961 by creating new offences for assaulting first responders and coward punching, raised penalties for shoplifting and human trafficking, and expanded citizen's arrest powers. On 18 August, Parliament unanimously passed legislation entrenching the Nelson Tenths settlement into law. That same day, Parliament passed the contentious Climate Change Response (Tort Liability) Amendment Bill, which prevents lawsuits against companies for climate changing-emissions under tort law.

On 3 September, Parliament passed the Emergency Management 2026, which replaced the Civil Defence Management Act 2002. That same day, Parliament passed legislation tightening the welfare benefits criteria for teenagers aged 18 and 19-years old based on a parental income test. In mid-September, Parliament passed two separate bills enacting the Crown's settlements with Whanganui Māori and Ngāti Ruapani. On 16 September, Parliament passed legislation directing local government bodies to focus on delivering core services and restricting council voting to elected members. On 17 September, Parliament passed two separate laws implementing the New Zealand–India Free Trade Agreement and empowering the Youth Court of New Zealand to send youth offenders to Military Style Academies.

On 18 September, Parliament passed the Government's contentious legislation empowering Police to issue "move-on" orders to people aged 18 years above for begging, rough sleeping, disorderly behaviour, disturbing the peace, and obstructing someone from entering a business. On 19 September, Parliament passed the government's legislation easing earthquake strengthening rules in most of New Zealand, particularly the upper North Island and the Chatham Islands. On 22 September, Parliament passed the Government's Planning Act 2026 and the Natural Environment Act 2026, which will replace the Resource Management Act 1991 as the main legislative framework for infrastructural and environmental regulations.

=== Workplace behaviour and disciplinary actions ===
==== Julie Anne Genter ====
In early May 2024, Green Party MP Julie Anne Genter was referred to Parliament's privileges committee following complaints that she intimidated National Party's MP Matt Doocey during a heated parliamentary exchange. In early August 2024, Genter was found in contempt of Parliament and ordered to apologise.

==== Tākuta Ferris ====
In late September 2024, Te Pati Māori MP Tākuta Ferris was referred to Parliament's Privileges Committee after he made remarks accused Members of Parliament of lying and obfuscation. On 12 February 2025, the Privileges Committee found that Ferris deliberately misled the House and ordered that he apologise for calling other MPs "liars".

==== 2024 Treaty Principles Bill haka ====
On 10 December 2024, Labour MP Peeni Henare, Te Pāti Māori MPs Hana-Rawhiti Maipi-Clarke, co-leaders Rawiri Waititi and Debbie Ngarewa-Packer were referred to the Privileges Committee for leading a haka (ka mate) that interrupted vote proceedings during the first reading of the Treaty Principles Bill on 14 November. On 26 March, the Committee found that Henare had acted in a "disorderly" way in joining the Te Pāti Māori-led haka but ruled that his actions did not amount to "contempt."

On 1 April 2025, Maipi-Clark, Waititi and Ngarewa-Packer declined to appear before the Privileges Committee, claiming they had been denied key legal rights such as a joint hearing, restrictions on their legal representation Christopher Finlayson, expert testimony from tikanga (Māori culture) expert Tā Pou Temara denied, hearing scheduling conflicts being ignored and concerns about disciplinary action against Maipi-Clarke. On 2 April, Chairperson of Privileges Committee Judith Collins confirmed that the privileges hearing would go ahead regardless of whether the three TPM MPs turned up. In response, Ngarewa-Packer and Waititi announced that Te Pāti Māori would boycott the hearing and hold its own "alternative independent hearing," dismissing the Privileges Committee as a "kangaroo court."

On 14 May, the Privileges Committee censured Maipi-Clark, Ngarewa-Packer and Waititi for "acting in a manner that could have the effect of intimidating a member of the House in the discharge of their duty" during the haka protest. Maipi-Clark was suspended from Parliament for seven days while the two co-leaders were suspended from Parliament for 21 days. The Privileges Committee's chair Judith Collins declined to confirm whether Parliamentary protocol would be updated to accommodate more Tikanga Māori. Te Pāti Māori issued a statement denouncing the verdict as punishment by colonial powers meant to intimidate them.

On 20 May, Parliament held a debate on the Privileges Committee's recommendation to suspend three Te Pāti Māori MPs. Labour leader Chris Hipkins agreed that the three MPs broke the rules of Parliament but disagreed with the suspension, instead proposing that Waititi and Ngarewa-Packer be suspended from Parliament for 24 hours and that no further action be taken against Maipi-Clark. Privileges Committee chair Judith Collins defended the suspension, describing their conduct as a "serious incident." Leader of the House Chris Bishop successfully moved a motion that the suspension debate be deferred until 5 June, allowing the Te Pāti Māori MPs to participate in the upcoming debate around the 2025 New Zealand budget. While the government coalition parties supported Bishop's motion, the opposition parties voted against it. On 5 June, Parliament voted along party lines to suspend the three TPM MPs.

==== Green Party–New Zealand First tensions ====
On 29 January 2025, the Green Party sent a letter asking Prime Minister Christopher Luxon and Speaker of the House Gerry Brownlee to condemn alleged racist and xenophobic remarks made by New Zealand First MPs and government ministers Winston Peters and Shane Jones towards several Green MPs from migrant backgrounds. Jones had made remarks about sending Mexicans home, a reference to Mexican-New Zealander MP Ricardo Menéndez March while Peters had accused Green MPs Lawrence Xu-Nan and Franciso Hernandez of seeking to impose "foreign ideas" on New Zealanders. In response, Jones and Peters defended their remarks, with the former accusing the aforementioned foreign-born MPs of not respecting New Zealand culture and the latter accusing the Greens of "faux outrage." Luxon refused to confirm whether he would discipline Peters and Jones but advised other MPs to "watch their language." The Mexican Embassy to New Zealand said it had raised concerns about Peters and Jones' remarks through diplomatic channels. Peters subsequently confirm that he would meet with the Ambassador at Waitangi in early February.

On 19 February 2025, NZ First MPs Peters and Jones criticised Green MP Menéndez March for referring to New Zealand as "Aotearoa" while questioning Immigration Minister Erica Stanford. Peters also sought to change standing orders around references to New Zealand. Speaker Brownlee defended March's right to refer to New Zealand as Aotearoa but reminded MPs to refer to New Zealand by both its English and Māori language names. On 4 March, Speaker Brownlee issued a ruling ordering Members of Parliament to stop complaining about the use of Aotearoa as the Māori name for New Zealand.

On 18 February 2026, Winston Peters twice criticised Green MP Teanau Tuiono for referring to New Zealand by its Māori name Aotearoa during a Question Time debate on New Zealand's climate aid policies to the Pacific. In response, Labour leader Chris Hipkins accused Peters of making racist remarks to the ethnic Cook Islander MP while Speaker Brownlee cautioned Peters against asking unacceptable questions." On 19 February, Brownlee ejected Shadow Leader of the House and Labour MP Kieran McAnulty from a House debate after the latter accused the former of showing "double standards" towards Peters over his treatment of Tuiono.

On 30 July, Peters told Green MP Lawrence Xu-Nan to "go back to your own country" during a debate on the previous government's response to the COVID-19 pandemic. His remarks drew criticism from other parliamentarians across the spectrum as well as the Chinese Ambassador Wang Xiaoling. Prime Minister Luxon condemned Peters' comments as "offensive" but declined to remove his as Foreign Minister. On 6 August, Speaker Brownlee rejected a Green Party request that Peters to be asked to withdraw and apologise for his remarks towards Xu-Nan.

==== Chlöe Swarbrick ====
On 12 August 2025, Greens co-leader Chlöe Swarbrick was removed from Parliament for the rest of the week by Speaker Brownlee after she criticised Government MPs during a debate on the recognition of Palestine. The following day, Swarbrick refused to apologise and was "named" by Brownlee, who ordered her to leave Parliament's debating chamber once again. This punishment means that Swarbrick as an MP will have to leave the House of Representatives once again and will have her pay docked for the duration of her suspension.

On 4 August 2026, Swarbrick was ejected from Parliament after accusing Speaker Brownlee of showing favoritism towards New Zealand First leader Winston Peters over opposition Members of Parliament during a Question Time debate. Swarbrick and her Green Party colleagues had also earlier condemned Peters for telling Green MP Lawrence Xu-Nan to "go back to his own country" during a parliamentary debate in late July 2026.

==== MBIE biometric upgrades controversy ====
On 26 August 2026, Parliament's Privileges Committee found two Ministry of Business, Innovation and Employment (MBIE) officials, chief executive Nick Blakeley and former Immigration New Zealand head Alison McDonald, in contempt of Parliament for not informing Parliament that a biometric upgrade project had been cancelled during a meeting with the Education and Workforce select committee in March 2026. In late September 2026, Blakely acknowledged that MBIE had spent NZ$50.7 million in taxpayer funding on the botched biometric upgrade project without delivering any results.

==== Other ejections ====
On 15 September 2026, Speaker Brownlee ordered Labour MP Ginny Andersen and ACT leader David Seymour to leave the House of Representatives. Andersen had heckled National MP Carl Bates as he answered a question while Seymour had argued with the Speaker while questioning ACT MP Laura McClure.

On 17 September, Te Pāti Māori co-leader Debbie Ngarewa-Packer was ordered to leave the House after using the swear word "cunt" during an argument with Assistant Speaker Maureen Pugh during a debate on the National-led government's contentious move-on orders. Labour MP Willie Jackson was then ordered to leave after contesting Pugh's decision to discipline Ngarewa-Packer when the same word had previously been used in the House. After Jackson continued to speak, Pugh ordered the Sergeant-at-arms to escort him from the debating chamber.

=== Dissolution ===
The 54th Parliament will serve until another election is called. Under section 17 of the Constitution Act 1986, Parliament expires three years "from the day fixed for the return of the writs issued for the last preceding general election of members of the House of Representatives, and no longer". The writ for the 2023 election was issued on 10 September 2023 and returned on 16 November 2023, meaning that the 54th Parliament would have to dissolve on or before 16 November 2026.

== Officeholders ==
=== Presiding officers ===
- Speaker of the House: Rt. Hon. Gerry Brownlee (National)
- Deputy Speaker of the House: Barbara Kuriger (National)
- Assistant Speakers of the House:
  - Maureen Pugh (National)
  - Greg O'Connor (Labour)
  - Teanau Tuiono (Green)

==== Other parliamentary officers ====
- Clerk: David Wilson
- Deputy Clerk: Suze Jones
- Serjeant-at-Arms: Steve Streefkerk

=== Party leaders ===
- Prime Minister of New Zealand (National): Rt. Hon. Christopher Luxon
  - Deputy Leader of the National Party: Hon. Nicola Willis
- Deputy Prime Minister of New Zealand:
  - Hon. David Seymour (from 31 May 2025)
  - Rt. Hon. Winston Peters (until 31 May 2025)
- Leader of the Opposition (Labour): Rt. Hon. Chris Hipkins
  - Deputy Leader of the Opposition: Hon. Carmel Sepuloni
- Co-leaders of the Green Party of Aotearoa New Zealand:
  - Hon. Marama Davidson
  - Chlöe Swarbrick (from 10 March 2024)
  - Hon. James Shaw (until 10 March 2024)
- Leader of ACT New Zealand: Hon. David Seymour
  - Deputy Leader of ACT New Zealand:
    - Hon. Nicole McKee (from 28 June 2026)
    - Hon. Brooke van Velden (until 28 June 2026)
- Leader of New Zealand First: Rt. Hon. Winston Peters
  - Deputy Leader of New Zealand First: Hon. Shane Jones (from 17 September 2025)
- Co-leaders of Te Pāti Māori:
  - Female Co-leader: Debbie Ngarewa-Packer
  - Male Co-leader: Rawiri Waititi

=== Floor leaders ===
- Leader of the House:
  - Hon. Louise Upston (from 7 April 2026)
  - Hon. Chris Bishop (until 7 April 2026)
    - Deputy Leader of the House:
      - Hon. Scott Simpson (from 7 April 2026)
      - Hon. Louise Upston (from 24 January 2025 until 7 April 2026)
      - Hon. Simeon Brown (until 24 January 2025)
- Shadow Leader of the House: Hon. Kieran McAnulty
  - Deputy Shadow Leader of the House:
    - Tangi Utikere (from 11 March 2026)
    - Hon. Duncan Webb (until 11 March 2026)

=== Whips ===
- Senior Government (National) Whip:
  - Stuart Smith (from 4 March 2025)
  - Hon. Scott Simpson (until 4 March 2025)
    - Junior Government (National) Whips: Suze Redmayne
- Senior Opposition (Labour) Whip:
  - Glen Bennett (from 11 March 2025)
  - Tangi Utikere (until 11 March 2025)
    - Junior Opposition (Labour) Whip:
      - Tracey McLellan (from 11 March 2025)
      - Camilla Belich (until 11 March 2025)
    - Assistant Opposition (Labour) Whip:
      - Cushla Tangaere-Manuel (from 11 March 2025)
      - Arena Williams (until 11 March 2025)
- Green Party Whip (Musterer): Ricardo Menéndez March
  - Green Party Deputy Musterer: Kahurangi Carter
- ACT Party Whip: Todd Stephenson
- New Zealand First Whip: Jamie Arbuckle
- Te Pāti Māori Whip (Matarau):
  - Debbie Ngarewa-Packer (from 9 September 2025)
  - Mariameno Kapa-Kingi (until 9 September 2025)

=== Shadow cabinets ===
- Opposition Cabinet of Chris Hipkins during the 54th Parliament

== Members ==
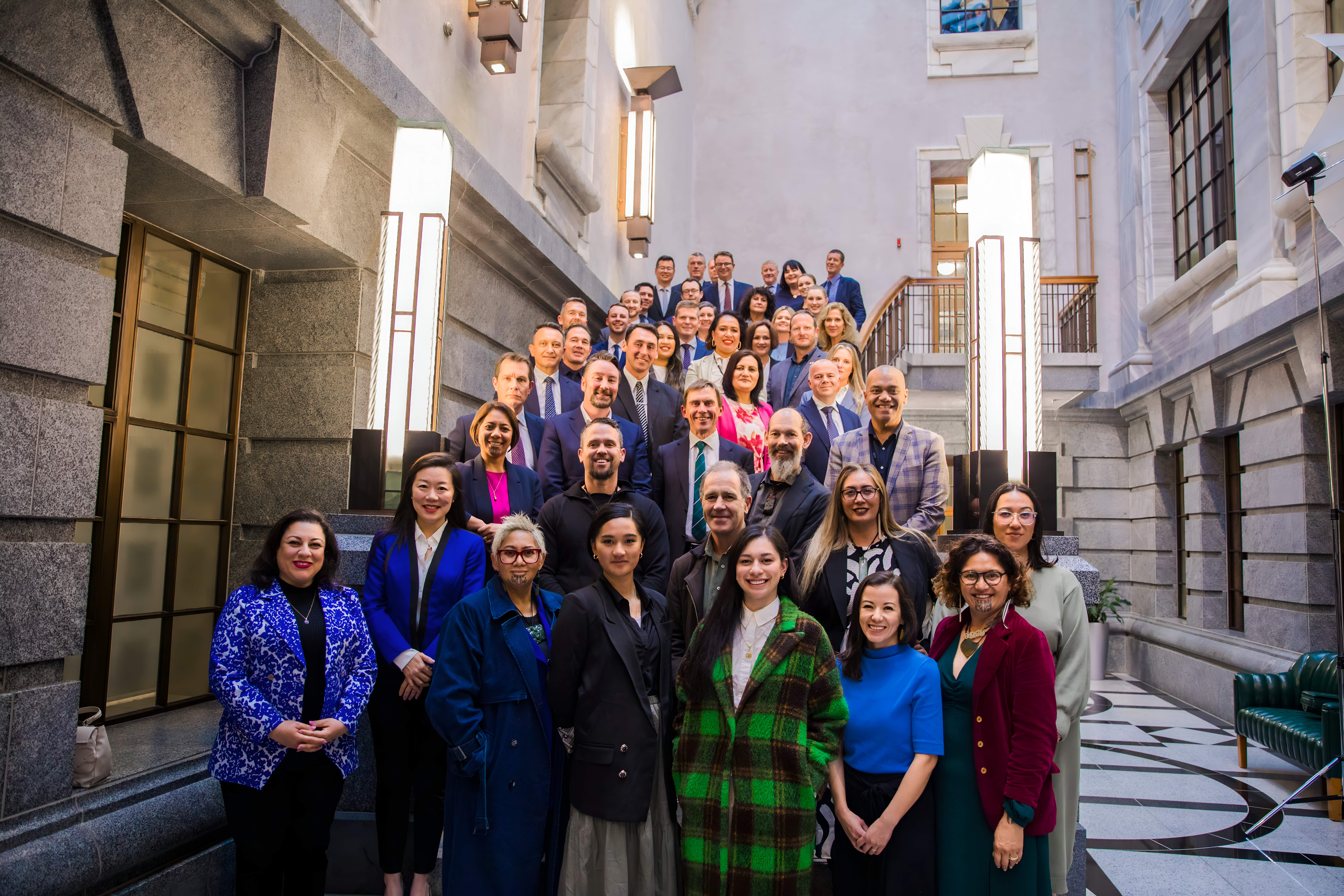
Group photo of new Members of Parliament

=== Overview ===
The table below shows the members of the 54th Parliament based on the results of the 2023 general election, including the result of the Port Waikato by-election. Ministerial roles were officially announced on 24 November 2023. Based on the official results, 41 candidates who had never been in parliament before were returned. Of those, 19 were from National, 2 from Labour, 8 from the Greens, 4 from ACT, 4 from Te Pāti Māori, and 4 from NZ First. The parliament totaled 123 seats after the conclusion of the Port Waikato by-election, meaning that one-third of the members are newcomers.

This table shows the number of MPs in each party:

Affiliation	Members	
Affiliation	At 2023 Port Waikato by-election	At dissolution
National	49	48
ACT	11	11
NZ First	8	8
Government total	68	67
Labour	34	34
Green	15	15
Te Pāti Māori	6	4
Independent	0	2
Opposition total	55	55
Total MPs in Parliament	123	122
Working Government majority	13	12

Notes

- The Working Government majority is calculated as all Government MPs less all other parties.

=== Members ===
National (48)
Rank	Photo	Name	Electorate (list if blank)	Term in office	Portfolios & Responsibilities
Ministers in Cabinet
1	Christopher Luxon	Christopher Luxon	Botany	2020–	Prime Minister; Leader of the National Party; Minister for National Security and Intelligence; Minister Responsible for Ministerial Services; Chair of the Intelligence and Security Committee
2	Nicola Willis	Nicola Willis		2018–	Deputy Leader of the National Party; Minister of Finance; Minister for Economic Growth; Minister for Social Investment
3	Chris Bishop	Chris Bishop	Hutt South	2014–	Attorney General; Minister of Housing; Minister for Infrastructure; Minister Responsible for RMA Reform; Minister of Transport; Associate Minister of Finance
4	Simeon Brown	Simeon Brown	Pakuranga	2017–	Minister of Health; Minister for Energy; Minister for State Owned Enterprises
5	Erica Stanford	Erica Stanford	East Coast Bays	2017–	Minister of Education; Minister for Immigration; Lead Coordination Minister for the Government's Response to the Royal Commission's Report into Historical Abuse in State Care and in the Care of Faith-based Institutions
6	Paul Goldsmith	Paul Goldsmith		2011–	Minister for Arts, Culture and Heritage; Minister of Defence; Minister for Pacific Peoples; Minister for the Public Service and Digitising Government; Minister Responsible for the GCSB; Minister Responsible for the NZSIS; Minister for Space; Minister of Justice; Minister for Media and Communications; Minister for Treaty of Waitangi Negotiations; Minister for Veterans
7	Louise Upston	Louise Upston	Taupō	2008–	Minister for the Community and Voluntary Sector; Minister for Disability Issues; Minister for Social Development and Employment; Minister for Tourism and Hospitality; Minister for Child Poverty Reduction; Leader of the House
8	Mark Mitchell	Mark Mitchell	Whangaparāoa	2011–	Minister of Corrections; Minister for Emergency Management and Recovery; Minister for Ethnic Communities; Minister of Police; Minister for Sport and Recreation
9	Todd McClay	Todd McClay	Rotorua	2008–	Minister of Agriculture; Minister of Forestry; Minister for Trade; Associate Minister of Foreign Affairs
11	Tama Potaka	Tama Potaka	Hamilton West	2022–	Minister of Conservation; Minister for Māori Crown Relations: Te Arawhiti; Minister for Māori Development; Minister for Whānau Ora; Associate Minister of Housing (Social Housing)
10	Matt Doocey	Matt Doocey	Waimakariri	2014–	Minister for Mental Health; Associate Minister of Health
11	Simon Watts	Simon Watts	North Shore	2020–	Minister for Building and Construction; Minister of Climate Change; Minister of Local Government; Minister of Revenue; Minister for Auckland
Ministers outside Cabinet
12	Penny Simmonds	Penny Simmonds	Invercargill	2020–	Minister of Science, Innovation and Technology; Minister for Tertiary Education; Associate Minister for Social Development and Employment
13	Nicola Grigg	Nicola Grigg	Selwyn	2020–	Minister for the Environment; Minister of State for Trade; Minister for Women; Associate Minister of Agriculture (Horticulture); Associate Minister for ACC
14	James Meager	James Meager	Rangitata	2023–	Minister for Hunting and Fishing; Minister for Youth; Minister for the South Island; Associate Minister for Transport
15	Scott Simpson	Scott Simpson	Coromandel	2011–	Minister for ACC; Minister of Statistics; Deputy Leader of the House; Deputy Chair of the Parliament Bill Committee
16	Cameron Brewer	Cameron Brewer	Upper Harbour	2023–	Minister of Commerce and Consumer Affairs; Minister for Small Business and Manufacturing
17	Mike Butterick	Mike Butterick	Wairarapa	2023–	Minister for Land Information
Officers of Parliament
	Gerry Brownlee	Gerry Brownlee		1996–	Speaker of the House; Chair of the Business, Officers of Parliament, and Standing Orders Committees
	Barbara Kuriger	Barbara Kuriger	Taranaki-King Country	2014–	Deputy Speaker
	Maureen Pugh	Maureen Pugh	West Coast-Tasman	2016–2017 2018–	Assistant Speaker
Members of Parliament
18	Stuart Smith	Stuart Smith	Kaikōura	2014–	Chief Government Whip
19	Suze Redmayne	Suze Redmayne	Rangitīkei	2023–	Junior Whip
20	Shane Reti	Shane Reti	Whangārei	2014–	
21	Melissa Lee	Melissa Lee		2008–	
22	Chris Penk	Chris Penk	Kaipara ki Mahurangi	2017–	
23	Andrew Bayly	Andrew Bayly	Port Waikato	2014–	Chair of the Justice Committee
24	Nancy Lu	Nancy Lu		2023–	Deputy Chair of the Regulations Review Committee
25	Katie Nimon	Katie Nimon	Napier	2023–	Chair of the Education and Workforce Committee
26	Catherine Wedd	Catherine Wedd	Tukituki	2023–	Chair of the Environment Committee
27	Paulo Garcia	Paulo Garcia	New Lynn	2019–2020 2023–	Deputy Chair of the Social Services and Community Committee
28	Vanessa Weenink	Vanessa Weenink	Banks Peninsula	2023–	Deputy Chair of the Economic Development, Science and Innovation Committee
29	Rima Nakhle	Rima Nakhle	Takanini	2023–	Deputy Chair of the Māori Affairs Committee
30	Dana Kirkpatrick	Dana Kirkpatrick	East Coast	2023–	
31	Carl Bates	Carl Bates	Whanganui	2023–	Deputy Chair of the Education and Workforce Committee
32	Carlos Cheung	Carlos Cheung	Mount Roskill	2023–	
33	Joseph Mooney	Joseph Mooney	Southland	2020–	Chair of the Social Services and Community Committee
34	Sam Uffindell	Sam Uffindell	Tauranga	2022–	Chair of the Health Committee
35	Tim van de Molen	Tim van de Molen	Waikato	2017–	Chair of the Foreign Affairs, Defence and Trade Committee
36	Miles Anderson	Miles Anderson	Waitaki	2023–	Deputy Chair of the Primary Production Committee
38	Dan Bidois	Dan Bidois	Northcote	2018–2020 2023–	Deputy Chair of the Transport and Infrastructure Committee
39	Hamish Campbell	Hamish Campbell	Ilam	2023–	Deputy Chair of the Health Committee
40	Tim Costley	Tim Costley	Ōtaki	2023–	Deputy Chair of the Governance and Administration Committee
41	Greg Fleming	Greg Fleming	Maungakiekie	2023–	Deputy Chair of the Petitions Committee
42	Ryan Hamilton	Ryan Hamilton	Hamilton East	2023–	Deputy Chair of the Finance and Expenditure Committee
43	David MacLeod	David MacLeod	New Plymouth	2023–	Chair of the Māori Affairs Committee
44	Grant McCallum	Grant McCallum	Northland	2023–	Deputy Chair of the Environment Committee
45	Tom Rutherford	Tom Rutherford	Bay of Plenty	2023–	
Members of the National caucus who resigned during the term of the 54th Parliament
	Judith Collins	Judith Collins	Papakura	2002–2026	Resigned May 2026

ACT New Zealand (11)
Rank	Photo	Name	Electorate (list if blank)	Term in office	Portfolios & Responsibilities
Ministers in Cabinet
1	David Seymour	David Seymour	Epsom	2014–	Leader of ACT New Zealand; Deputy Prime Minister; Minister for Regulation; Associate Minister of Education (Partnership Schools); Associate Minister of Finance; Associate Minister of Health (Pharmac); Associate Minister of Justice (Treaty Principles Bill)
2	Brooke van Velden	Brooke van Velden	Tāmaki	2020–	Deputy Leader of ACT New Zealand; Minister of Internal Affairs; Minister for Workplace Relations and Safety
3	Nicole McKee	Nicole McKee		2020–	Minister for Courts; Associate Minister of Justice (Firearms)
Ministers outside Cabinet
4	Andrew Hoggard	Andrew Hoggard		2023–	Minister for Biosecurity; Minister for Food Safety; Associate Minister of Agriculture (Animal Welfare, Skills); Associate Minister for the Environment
5	Karen Chhour	Karen Chhour		2020–	Minister for Children; Minister for the Prevention of Family and Sexual Violence
Parliamentary Under-Secretaries
6	Simon Court	Simon Court		2020–	Parliamentary Under-Secretary to the; Minister for Infrastructure; Minister for RMA Reform; ACT Spokesperson for; Climate Change; Energy and Resources
Members of Parliament
7	Todd Stephenson	Todd Stephenson		2023–	Party Whip; Spokesperson for Arts, Culture and Heritage; Spokesperson for Finance; Spokesperson for Health; Spokesperson for Justice; Spokesperson for Public Service; Spokesperson for Tourism
8		Mark Cameron		2020–	Chair of the Primary Production Committee; Spokesperson for Agriculture; Spokesperson for Defence; Spokesperson for Fisheries; Spokesperson for Forestry; Spokesperson for Hunting and Fishing; Spokesperson for Rural Communities; Spokesperson for Veterans
9	Parmjeet Parmar	Parmjeet Parmar		2014–2020 2023–	Chair of the Economic Development, Science and Innovation Committee; Spokesperson for Commerce and Consumer Affairs; Spokesperson for Ethnic Communities; Spokesperson for Immigration; Spokesperson for Research; Spokesperson for Social Development; Spokesperson for Tertiary Education and Skills; Spokesperson for Trade
10	Laura McClure	Laura McClure		2023–	Spokesperson for Education; Spokesperson for Mental Health; Spokesperson for Small Business; Spokesperson for Social Development (Seniors)
11	Cameron Luxton	Cameron Luxton		2023–	Spokesperson for Conservation; Spokesperson for Housing, Building and Construction; Spokesperson for Infrastructure; Spokesperson for Local Government; Spokesperson for Transport

New Zealand First (8)
Rank	Photo	Name	Electorate (list if blank)	Term in office	Portfolios & Responsibilities
Ministers in Cabinet
1	Winston Peters	Winston Peters		1979–1981 1984–2008 2011–2020 2023–	Leader of New Zealand First; Minister of Foreign Affairs; Minister for Racing; Minister for Rail; NZ First Spokesperson for; Foreign Affairs; Pacific Island Affairs; Security Issues and GCSB; Defence and Veterans; Disarmament and Arms Control; Covid Inquiry; Racing; Rail
2	Shane Jones	Shane Jones		2005–2014 2017–2020 2023–	Deputy Leader of New Zealand First; Minister for Oceans and Fisheries; Minister for Regional Development; Minister for Resources; Associate Minister of Finance; Associate Minister for Energy; NZ First Spokesperson for; Regional Development; Resources; Oceans and Fisheries; Finance; Energy; Economic Development and Infrastructure; Research and Development; Building and Construction; Transport; Infrastructure; State Owned Enterprises; Māori Affairs; Treaty Issues; Climate Change and ETS
3	Casey Costello	Casey Costello		2023–	Minister of Customs; Minister for Seniors; Associate Minister of Health; Associate Minister for Immigration; Associate Minister for Police; NZ First Spokesperson for; Customs; Seniors; Health; Immigration; Police; Law and Order; Justice and the Courts; Corrections; Serious Fraud; Gangs and Organised Crime; Youth Justice; Firearms; Crown Legal Services; Ethnic Affairs; Human Rights
Ministers outside Cabinet
4		Mark Patterson		2017–2020 2023–	Minister for Rural Communities; Associate Minister of Agriculture; Associate Minister for Regional Development; NZ First Spokesperson for; Rural Communities; Agriculture; Employment and Employment Relations; Land Information; Biosecurity; Food Safety; Sport and Recreation; Horticulture
Parliamentary Under-Secretaries
5	Jenny Marcroft	Jenny Marcroft		2017–2020 2023–	Parliamentary Under-Secretary to the; Minister for Media and Communications; Minister for Oceans and Fisheries; NZ First Spokesperson for; Media and Communications; Health; Primary Care; PHARMAC and Medicines; Women's Affairs; Arts, Culture and Heritage; Children; Disability Issues; Family Issues
Members of Parliament
6	Jamie Arbuckle	Jamie Arbuckle		2023–	Party Whip; Deputy Chair of the Justice Committee; Spokesperson for the Environment; Spokesperson for Aquaculture; Spokesperson for RMA; Spokesperson for Tourism; Spokesperson for Enterprise; Spokesperson for Social Development; Spokesperson for Youth Affairs
7	Andy Foster	Andy Foster		2023–	Chair of the Transport and Infrastructure Committee; Spokesperson for Education; Spokesperson for Housing; Spokesperson for Local Government; Spokesperson for Tertiary, Adult and Community Education; Spokesperson for Civil Defence; Spokesperson for Internal Affairs; Spokesperson for Democracy, Government and Electoral Affairs; Spokesperson for Social Housing; Spokesperson for Conservation; Spokesperson for the Community and Volunteer; Associate Spokesperson for Transport
8		David Wilson		2025–	Spokesperson for Small Business; Spokesperson for ACC; Spokesperson for Commerce and Consumer Affairs; Spokesperson for Statistics; Spokesperson for Auckland; Spokesperson for Science and Innovation; Spokesperson for Digital; Associate Spokesperson for Economic Development and Infrastructure; Associate Spokesperson for Research and Development; Associate Spokesperson for State-Owned Enterprises; Associate Spokesperson for Regional Development; Associate Spokesperson for Finance; Associate Spokesperson for Infrastructure
Members of the New Zealand First caucus who resigned during the term of the 54th Parliament
	Tanya Unkovich	Tanya Unkovich		2023–2025	Resigned June 2025

Labour (34)
Rank	Photo	Name	Electorate (list if blank)	Term in office	Portfolios & Responsibilities
1	Chris Hipkins	Chris Hipkins	Remutaka	2008–	Leader of the Opposition; Leader of the Labour Party; Spokesperson for Ministerial Services; Spokesperson for National Security and Intelligence
2	Carmel Sepuloni	Carmel Sepuloni	Kelston	2008–2011 2014–	Deputy Leader of the Opposition; Deputy Leader of the Labour Party; Spokesperson for Auckland Issues; Spokesperson for Pacific Peoples; Spokesperson for Women
3	Barbara Edmonds	Barbara Edmonds	Mana	2020–	Spokesperson for Finance; Spokesperson for Spokesperson for the Economy, Savings and Interest
4	Megan Woods	Megan Woods	Wigram	2011–	Spokesperson for Manufacturing and Industry; Spokesperson for Energy and Resources; Associate Spokesperson for Finance
5	Willie Jackson	Willie Jackson		1999–2002 2017–	Spokesperson for Māori Development; Spokesperson for Māori Crown Relations
6	Ayesha Verrall	Ayesha Verrall		2020–	Spokesperson for Health; Spokesperson for Wellington Issues
7	Kieran McAnulty	Kieran McAnulty		2017–	Shadow Leader of the House; Deputy Chair of the Standing Orders Committee; Spokesperson for Housing; Spokesperson for Infrastructure; Spokesperson for Public Investment
8	Willow-Jean Prime	Willow-Jean Prime		2020–	Spokesperson for Social Development; Spokesperson for Children
9	Ginny Andersen	Ginny Andersen		2017–	Spokesperson for Education; Spokesperson for Police; Spokesperson for Jobs and Income; Spokesperson for Treaty of Waitangi Negotiations
10	Jan Tinetti	Jan Tinetti		2017–	Spokesperson for Workplace Relations and Safety; Spokesperson for Social Investment; Spokesperson for Early Childhood Education; Spokesperson for Child Poverty Reduction
11	Tangi Utikere	Tangi Utikere	Palmerston North	2020–	Deputy Shadow Leader of the House; Spokesperson for Transport; Spokesperson for Local Government; Spokesperson for Racing; Spokesperson for Small Business
12	Vanushi Walters	Vanushi Walters		2020–2023 2025–	Shadow Attorney-General; Spokesperson for Foreign Affairs; Spokesperson for the NZSIS; Spokesperson for the GCSB
13	Reuben Davidson	Reuben Davidson	Christchurch East	2023–	Spokesperson for Economic Development; Spokesperson for Science, Technology and Innovation; Spokesperson for Broadcasting, Media and Creative Economy
14	Priyanca Radhakrishnan	Priyanca Radhakrishnan		2017–	Spokesperson for Conservation; Spokesperson for Disability Issues; Spokesperson for ACC
15	Jo Luxton	Jo Luxton		2017–	Spokesperson for Agriculture; Spokesperson for Biosecurity; Spokesperson for Customs
16	Deborah Russell	Deborah Russell		2017–	Spokesperson for Revenue; Spokesperson for Climate Change; Associate Spokesperson for Finance
17	Rachel Brooking	Rachel Brooking	Dunedin	2020–	Spokesperson for the Environment; Spokesperson for Food Safety; Spokesperson for Space; Spokesperson for RMA Reform
18	Damien O'Connor	Damien O'Connor		1993–2008 2009–	Deputy Chair of the Foreign Affairs, Defence and Trade Committee; Spokesperson for Trade; Spokesperson for Defence; Spokesperson for Land Information; Spokesperson for Regional Development
19	Camilla Belich	Camilla Belich		2020–2023 2023–	Chair of the Governance and Administration Committee; Spokesperson for Justice; Spokesperson for Public Services
20	Cushla Tangaere-Manuel	Cushla Tangaere-Manuel	Ikaroa-Rawhiti	2023–	Assistant Whip; Spokesperson for Emergency Management and Recovery; Spokesperson for the Natural Hazards Commission; Spokesperson for Sport and Recreation; Spokesperson for Forestry; Spokesperson for Māori Economy
21	Glen Bennett	Glen Bennett		2020–2023 2024–	Senior Whip; Spokesperson for Tourism and Hospitality
22	Tracey McLellan	Tracey McLellan		2020–2023 2024–	Junior Whip; Spokesperson for Corrections; Spokesperson for Christchurch Issues
23	Jenny Salesa	Jenny Salesa	Panmure-Ōtāhuhu	2014–	Spokesperson for Ethnic Communities; Spokesperson for Customs
24	Arena Williams	Arena Williams	Manurewa	2020–	Chair of the Regulations Review Committee; Spokesperson for Commerce and Consumer Affairs; Spokesperson for Building and Construction; Spokesperson for Youth
25	Phil Twyford	Phil Twyford	Te Atatū	2008–	Spokesperson for Immigration; Spokesperson for Disarmament and Arms Control; Associate Spokesperson for Foreign Affairs
26	Greg O'Connor	Greg O'Connor	Ōhāriu	2017–	Assistant Speaker; Chair of the Petitions Committee; Deputy Chair of the Officers of Parliament Committee; Spokesperson for Courts; Spokesperson for Veterans
27	Rachel Boyack	Rachel Boyack	Nelson	2020–	Spokesperson for Oceans and Fisheries; Spokesperson for Arts, Culture, and Heritage; Spokesperson for Animal Welfare
28	Shanan Halbert	Shanan Halbert		2020–2023 2024–	Spokesperson for Tertiary Education; Spokesperson for Whānau Ora
29	Helen White	Helen White	Mount Albert	2020–	Spokesperson for the Community and Voluntary Sector; Spokesperson for Prevention of Family and Sexual Violence
30	Ingrid Leary	Ingrid Leary	Taieri	2020–	Spokesperson for Seniors; Spokesperson for Mental Health
31	Lemauga Lydia Sosene	Lemauga Lydia Sosene	Māngere	2022–	Spokesperson for Internal Affairs; Spokesperson for Statistics
32	Georgie Dansey	Georgie Dansey		2026–	Spokesperson for Rainbow Issues; Spokesperson for Regulation
33	Dan Rosewarne	Dan Rosewarne		2022–2023 2026–	Spokesperson for Rural Communities; Spokesperson for Small Business
34	Duncan Webb	Duncan Webb	Christchurch Central	2017–	
Members of the Labour caucus who resigned during the term of the 54th Parliament
	Andrew Little	Andrew Little		2011–2023	Resigned December 2023
	Rino Tirikatene	Rino Tirikatene		2011–2024	Resigned January 2024
	Kelvin Davis	Kelvin Davis		2008–2011 2014–2024	Resigned February 2024
	Grant Robertson	Grant Robertson		2008–2024	Resigned March 2024
	David Parker	David Parker		2002–2025	Resigned May 2025
	Adrian Rurawhe	Adrian Rurawhe		2014–2026	Resigned February 2026
	Peeni Henare	Peeni Henare		2014–2026	Resigned March 2026

Green Party of Aotearoa New Zealand (15)
Rank	Photo	Name	Electorate (list if blank)	Term in office	Portfolios & Responsibilities
1	Marama Davidson	Marama Davidson		2015–	Co-leader of the Green Party; Spokesperson for Conservation; Spokesperson for Child Poverty Reduction; Spokesperson for the Prevention of Family and Sexual Violence; Spokesperson for Social Investment
2	Chlöe Swarbrick	Chlöe Swarbrick	Auckland Central	2017–	Co-leader of the Green Party; Spokesperson for Climate Change; Spokesperson for Drug Law Reform; Spokesperson for Finance; Spokesperson for Mental Health; Spokesperson for Revenue
3	Julie Anne Genter	Julie Anne Genter	Rongotai	2011–	Spokesperson for Building and Construction; Spokesperson for Economic Development; Spokesperson for Infrastructure; Spokesperson for RMA Reform (Built Environment); Spokesperson for State Owned Enterprises; Spokesperson for Transport; Spokesperson for Urban Development
4	Teanau Tuiono	Teanau Tuiono		2020–	Assistant Speaker; Spokesperson for Defence and Disarmament; Spokesperson for Foreign Affairs; Spokesperson for National Security and Intelligence; Spokesperson for Ocean and Fisheries; Spokesperson for Pacific Peoples; Spokesperson for Space; Spokesperson for Veterans; Spokesperson for Workplace Relations and Safety
5	Lan Pham	Lan Pham		2023–	Spokesperson for Biosecurity and Customs; Spokesperson for the Environment; Spokesperson for Land Information; Spokesperson for RMA Reform (Environment); Spokesperson for Statistics; Spokesperson for Water Services
6	Ricardo Menéndez March	Ricardo Menéndez March		2020–	Green Party Whip (Musterer); Spokesperson for Auckland Issues; Spokesperson for Commerce and Consumer Affairs; Spokesperson for Immigration; Spokesperson for Social Development and Employment; Spokesperson for Workforce Planning and Development; Associate Spokesperson for Health (Primary Healthcare)
7	Steve Abel	Steve Abel		2023–	Spokesperson for Agriculture; Spokesperson for Animal Welfare; Spokesperson for Food Safety; Spokesperson for Just Transitions; Spokesperson for Māori Crown Relations: Te Arawhiti; Spokesperson for Racing; Spokesperson for Resources; Spokesperson for Treaty of Waitangi Negotiations
8	Hūhana Lyndon	Hūhana Lyndon		2023–	Spokesperson for Forestry; Spokesperson for Health; Spokesperson for Māori Development; Spokesperson for Media and Communications; Spokesperson for Whānau Ora; Associate Spokesperson for Ocean and Fisheries (Māori Fisheries)
9	Scott Willis	Scott Willis		2023–	Spokesperson for Dunedin Issues; Spokesperson for Energy; Spokesperson for Hunting and Fishing; Spokesperson for Regional Development; Spokesperson for Rural Communities; Spokesperson for Small Business and Manufacturing; Spokesperson for Sport and Recreation; Associate Spokesperson for Justice (Firearms)
10	Kahurangi Carter	Kahurangi Carter		2023–	Green Party Deputy Musterer; Spokesperson for Arts, Culture and Heritage; Spokesperson for Children; Spokesperson for the Community and Voluntary Sector; Spokesperson for Disability; Spokesperson for Women; Spokesperson for Zero Waste
11	Celia Wade-Brown	Celia Wade-Brown		2024–	Spokesperson for Democracy and Electoral Reform; Spokesperson for Digitising Government; Spokesperson for Local Government; Spokesperson for Tourism and Hospitality; Associate Spokesperson for Conservation (Predator Free)
12	Lawrence Xu-Nan	Lawrence Xu-Nan		2024–	Spokesperson for Courts; Spokesperson for Education; Spokesperson for Ethnic Communities; Spokesperson for Justice; Spokesperson for Overseas New Zealanders; Spokesperson for Seniors; Spokesperson for Trade
13	Francisco Hernandez	Francisco Hernandez		2024–	Spokesperson for Emergency Management and Recovery; Spokesperson for Regulation; Spokesperson for Science, Innovation and Technology; Spokesperson for Statistics; Spokesperson for Public Services; Spokesperson for Tertiary Education
14	Mike Davidson	Mike Davidson		2025–	
	Tamatha Paul	Tamatha Paul	Wellington Central	2023–	Spokesperson for Corrections; Spokesperson for the Government Response to March 15; Spokesperson for Housing; Spokesperson for Police; Spokesperson for Youth; Spokesperson for Youth Justice; Associate Spokesperson for Justice (Māori Justice Issues)
Members of the Green caucus who resigned during the term of the 54th Parliament
	Golriz Ghahraman	Golriz Ghahraman		2017–2024	Resigned January 2024
	James Shaw	James Shaw		2014–2024	Resigned May 2024
	Benjamin Doyle	Benjamin Doyle		2024–2025	Resigned October 2025
Members of the Green caucus who died during the term of the 54th Parliament
	Efeso Collins	Efeso Collins		2023–2024	Died February 2024
Members of the Green caucus who were expelled during the term of the 54th Parliament
	Darleen Tana	Darleen Tana		2023–2024	Green Party member until July 2024

Te Pāti Māori (5)
Rank	Photo	Name	Electorate (list if blank)	Term in office	Portfolios & Responsibilities
1	Debbie Ngarewa-Packer	Debbie Ngarewa-Packer	Te Tai Hauāuru	2020–	Female Co-leader of Te Pāti Māori; Te Pāti Māori Whip (Matarau); Spokesperson for Health; Spokesperson for Climate Change; Spokesperson for the Environment; Spokesperson for Energy and Resources; Spokesperson for Takatāpui; Spokesperson for the Digital Economy; Spokesperson for ACC; Spokesperson for Immigration; Spokesperson for Pacific Peoples; Spokesperson for Human Rights; Spokesperson for Technology
2	Rawiri Waititi	Rawiri Waititi	Waiariki	2020–	Male Co-leader of Te Pāti Māori; Spokesperson for Finance; Spokesperson for Economic Development; Spokesperson for Trade and Enterprise; Spokesperson for Revenue; Spokesperson for Procurement; Spokesperson for Defence; Spokesperson for Foreign Affairs; Spokesperson for Intelligence; Spokesperson for Māori Performing Arts; Spokesperson for Arts, Culture and Heritage
3	Hana-Rawhiti Maipi-Clarke	Hana-Rawhiti Maipi-Clarke	Hauraki-Waikato	2023–	Spokesperson for Māori Development; Spokesperson for Rangatahi; Spokesperson for Te Reo Māori; Spokesperson for Kai Sovereignty; Spokesperson for Agriculture; Spokesperson for Conservation; Spokesperson for Sports and Recreation; Spokesperson for Food Safety; Spokesperson for Biosecurity; Spokesperson for Customs
4	Oriini Kaipara	Oriini Kaipara	Tamaki Makaurau	2025–	
		Mariameno Kapa-Kingi	Te Tai Tokerau	2023–	Te Pāti Māori member until November 2025; Reinstated December 2025
Members of Te Pāti Māori caucus who died during the term of the 54th Parliament
	Takutai Tarsh Kemp	Takutai Tarsh Kemp	Tāmaki Makaurau	2023–2025	Died June 2025
Members of Te Pāti Māori caucus who were expelled during the term of the 54th Parliament
	Tākuta Ferris	Tākuta Ferris	Te Tai Tonga	2023–	Te Pāti Māori member until November 2025

Independent (1)
Name	Photo	Electorate (list if blank)	Term in office	Notes
Tākuta Ferris	Tākuta Ferris	Te Tai Tonga	2023–	Te Pāti Māori member until November 2025
Members who were expelled during the term of the 54th Parliament
Darleen Tana	Darleen Tana		2023–2024	Green Party member until July 2024; Expelled October 2024

=== Demographics ===
The 54th Parliament has a historically high number of Māori MPs at 33. The number of female MPs, 55, is the second highest in New Zealand history, down from the high of 61 achieved during the 53rd Parliament.

The number of Pasifika MPs, 6, is also down from the record number in the previous parliament, and is at its lowest number in 10 years. There are currently no Pasifika MPs on the government benches.

Only 5 MPs who publicly identify as LGBTQIA+ were elected, 2 each from Labour and the Greens and 1 from ACT. This is down from a record 12 (10%) elected in the 2020 election.

The following table shows the gender split of MPs at the start of the 54th New Zealand Parliament:

Party	Female			Male		
Party	No.	±	%	No.	±	%
National	16	▲	31%	33	▲	69%
Labour	19	▼	56%	15	▼	44%
Greens	9		60%	6		40%
ACT	4		36%	7		64%
New Zealand First	3	▲3	38%	5	▲5	63%
Te Pāti Māori	4	▲3	67%	2	▲1	33%
Total	55	▼7	44%	68	▲9	56%

=== Changes ===
The following changes in Members of Parliament occurred during the term of the 54th Parliament:

#	Seat	Incumbent				Replacement			
#	Seat	Party	Name	Date vacated	Reason	Party	Name	Date elected	Change
1.	List	Labour	Andrew Little	5 December 2023	Resigned to allow a newer Labour MP into parliament	Labour	Camilla Belich	6 December 2023	List
2.	List^{1}	National	Andrew Bayly	13 December 2023	Elected to electorate seat	National	Nancy Lu	14 December 2023	National gain
3.	List	Green	Golriz Ghahraman	18 January 2024	Resigned due to shop-lifting allegations	Green	Celia Wade-Brown	19 January 2024	List
4.	List	Labour	Rino Tirikatene	28 January 2024	Resigned after losing Te Tai Tonga in 2023 election	Labour	Tracey McLellan	29 January 2024	List
5.	List	Labour	Kelvin Davis	6 February 2024	Resigned after losing Te Tai Tokerau in 2023 election	Labour	Shanan Halbert	7 February 2024	List
6.	List	Green	Efeso Collins	21 February 2024	Died	Green	Lawrence Xu-Nan	6 March 2024	List
7.	List	Labour	Grant Robertson	22 March 2024	Resigned to take up the role of Vice-Chancellor of the University of Otago	Labour	Glen Bennett	25 March 2024	List
8.	List	Green	James Shaw	5 May 2024	Resigned to take up governance and advisory roles in the climate sector	Green	Francisco Hernandez	6 May 2024	List
9.	List	Green	Darleen Tana	8 July 2024	Resigned from the Green Party due to allegations of migrant exploitation	Independent	Darleen Tana	8 July 2024	Independent gain; Green loss
10.	List	Independent	Darleen Tana	22 October 2024	Expelled from Parliament under the Electoral (Integrity) Amendment Act 2018	Green	Benjamin Doyle	22 October 2024	Green gain; Independent loss
11.	List	Labour	David Parker	12 May 2025	Resigned	Labour	Vanushi Walters	12 May 2025	List
12.	Tāmaki Makaurau	Te Pāti Māori	Takutai Tarsh Kemp	26 June 2025	Died	Te Pāti Māori	Oriini Kaipara	6 September 2025	Te Pāti Māori hold (By-election)
13.	List	NZ First	Tanya Unkovich	27 June 2025	Resigned	NZ First	David Wilson	30 June 2025	List
14.	List	Green	Benjamin Doyle	3 October 2025	Resigned	Green	Mike Davidson	6 October 2025	List
15.	Te Tai Tonga	Te Pāti Māori	Tākuta Ferris	10 November 2025	Expelled from Te Pāti Māori	Independent	Tākuta Ferris	10 November 2025	Independent gain; Te Pāti Māori loss
16.	Te Tai Tokerau	Te Pāti Māori	Mariameno Kapa-Kingi	10 November 2025	Expelled from Te Pāti Māori	Independent	Mariameno Kapa-Kingi	10 November 2025	Independent gain; Te Pāti Māori loss
17.	Te Tai Tokerau	Independent	Mariameno Kapa-Kingi	5 December 2025	Allowed to return to Te Pāti Māori via Court trial	Te Pāti Māori	Mariameno Kapa-Kingi	5 December 2025	Independent loss; Te Pāti Māori gain
18.	List	Labour	Adrian Rurawhe	6 February 2026	Resigned	Labour	Georgie Dansey	9 February 2026	List
19.	List	Labour	Peeni Henare	16 March 2026	Resigned	Labour	Dan Rosewarne	16 March 2026	List
20.	Papakura	National	Judith Collins	14 May 2026	Resigned to take up role as the President of the New Zealand Law Commission	None^{2}			

^1 This change occurred as a result of the elevation of Andrew Bayly, who had previously been elected as a list MP at the 2023 general election, to an electorate seat on 25 November 2023 at the Port Waikato by-election. Bayly resigned his list seat on 13 December 2023, creating a list vacancy.

^2 The resignation of Judith Collins took place less than six months before the 2026 New Zealand general election and therefore a by-election to fill the vacancy was not required.

== Seating plan ==
=== Start of term ===
The chamber is in a horseshoe-shape.

													Tangaere-Manuel	Lyndon	Tana	Carter	Rutherford
G. O’Connor	Rurawhe	Russell	Williams	Davis	Brooking	Parker	Twyford	Salesa	Boyack	White	Leary	Sosene	R. Davidson	Pham	E. Collins	S. Willis	Lu
D. O’Connor	Tinetti	Belich	Utikere	Webb	Edmonds	Henare	Radhakrishnan	J. Luxton	Tirikatene	Swarbrick	Paul	Genter	Tuiono		Ghahraman	Costley	Kirkpatrick
Verrall	McAnulty	Sepuloni	Hipkins	Robertson	Woods	Jackson	Prime	Andersen	M. Davidson	Shaw	Menéndez March	Ngarewa-Packer		Kemp	Abel	Cheung	Fleming
													Waititi	Kapa-Kingi	Maipi-Clarke
Brownlee															Ferris
Brownlee															Court
													McKee	Hoggard	Cameron
Costello	Jones	Peters	LUXON	N. Willis	Bishop	Reti	Brown	Stanford	Goldsmith	Upston	Seymour	van Velden		Stephenson	Chhour	C. Luxton	Weenink
Patterson	Marcroft	Arbuckle	Simpson	J. Collins	Mitchell	McClay	Potaka	Doocey	Bayly	Pugh	Mooney	Smith	Uffindell		Bates	Trask	Wedd
Unkovich	Foster	Kuriger	Redmayne	Lee	Watts	Simmonds	Penk	Grigg	van de Molen	Bidois	MacLeod	Meager	Nimon	Anderson	Campbell	Parmar	Nakhle
													Brewer	Butterick	Garcia	Hamilton	McCallum

=== End of term ===
The chamber is in a horseshoe-shape.

													Rosewarne	Xu-Nan	Rutherford	Weenink	Vacant
G. O’Connor	Webb	Brooking	Tangaere-Manuel	D. O'Connor	Belich	Salesa	Williams	Twyford	Halbert	White	Leary	Sosene	Dansey	Abel	Carter	Wade-Brown	Nakhle
Tinetti	Walters	McLellan	Bennett	Utikere	R. Davidson	Radhakrishnan	J. Luxton	Russell	Boyack	Paul	Genter	Tuiono	Pham		Lyndon	Ferris	McCallum
Verrall	McAnulty	Sepuloni	Hipkins	Edmonds	Woods	Jackson	Prime	Andersen	Marama Davidson	Swarbrick	Menéndez March	Ngarewa-Packer		Maipi-Clarke	S. Willis	Kapa-Kingi	Lu
													Waititi	Kaipara	Hernandez
Brownlee															Mike Davidson
Brownlee															MacLeod
													Costello	Marcroft	Hamilton
van Velden	McKee	Seymour	LUXON	N. Willis	Bishop	Brown	Stanford	Goldsmith	Upston	Mitchell	Jones	Peters		Patterson	Anderson	Bidois	Fleming
Chhour	Hoggard	Stephenson	Smith	McClay	Potaka	Doocey	Watts	Simmonds	Lee	Pugh	Foster	Wilson	Arbuckle		Uffindell	Wedd	Costley
Court	Cameron	Kuriger	Redmayne	Grigg	Meager	Simpson	Brewer	Butterick	Reti	Bayly	Penk	van de Molen	Mooney	Kirkpatrick	Nimon	Garcia	Cheung
													Parmar	McClure	C. Luxton	Bates	Campbell

== Committees ==
The 54th Parliament has 13 select committees and 7 specialist committees. They are listed below, with their chairpersons and deputy chairpersons:

Committee	Chairperson	Deputy chairperson	Government–Opposition divide
Select committees
Economic Development, Science and Innovation Committee	Parmjeet Parmar (ACT)	Vanessa Weenink (National)	4–4
Education and Workforce Committee	Katie Nimon (National)	Carl Bates (National)	5–4
Environment Committee	Catherine Wedd (National)	Grant McCallum (National)	5–4
Finance and Expenditure Committee	Cameron Brewer (National)	Ryan Hamilton (National)	6–5
Foreign Affairs, Defence and Trade Committee	Tim van de Molen (National)	Hon Peeni Henare (Labour)	4–3
Governance and Administration Committee	Camilla Belich (Labour)	Tim Costley (National)	4–3
Health Committee	Sam Uffindell (National)	Hamish Campbell (National)	5–4
Justice Committee	Hon Andrew Bayly (National)	Jamie Arbuckle (NZ First)	6–5
Māori Affairs Committee	David MacLeod (National)	Rima Nakhle (National)	4–4
Parliament Bill Committee	Rt Hon Adrian Rurawhe (Labour)	Hon Scott Simpson (National)	4–4
Primary Production Committee	Mark Cameron (ACT)	Miles Anderson (National)	4–3
Social Services and Community Committee	Joseph Mooney (National)	Paulo Garcia (National)	5–4
Transport and Infrastructure Committee	Andy Foster (NZ First)	Dan Bidois (National)	4–4
Specialist committees
Business Committee	Rt Hon Gerry Brownlee (National)	none	5–4
Intelligence and Security Committee	Rt Hon Christopher Luxon (National)	none	4–3
Officers of Parliament Committee	Rt Hon Gerry Brownlee (National)	Greg O'Connor (Labour)	5–4
Petitions Committee	Greg O'Connor (Labour)	Greg Fleming (National)	2–2
Privileges Committee	Hon Judith Collins (National)	Hon Duncan Webb (Labour)	5–4
Regulations Review Committee	Arena Williams (Labour)	Nancy Lu (National)	3–2
Standing Orders Committee	Rt Hon Gerry Brownlee (National)	Hon Kieran McAnulty (Labour)	5–4

== Electorates ==
This section shows the New Zealand electorates as they are currently represented in the 54th Parliament.

=== General electorates ===
Electorate	Region	MP	Party
Auckland Central	Auckland	Chlöe Swarbrick	Green
Banks Peninsula	Canterbury	Vanessa Weenink	National
Bay of Plenty	Bay of Plenty	Tom Rutherford	National
Botany	Auckland	Christopher Luxon	National
Christchurch Central	Canterbury	Duncan Webb	Labour
Christchurch East	Canterbury	Reuben Davidson	Labour
Coromandel	Waikato	Scott Simpson	National
Dunedin	Otago	Rachel Brooking	Labour
East Coast	Gisborne and Bay of Plenty	Dana Kirkpatrick	National
East Coast Bays	Auckland	Erica Stanford	National
Epsom	Auckland	David Seymour	ACT
Hamilton East	Waikato	Ryan Hamilton	National
Hamilton West	Waikato	Tama Potaka	National
Hutt South	Wellington	Chris Bishop	National
Ilam	Canterbury	Hamish Campbell	National
Invercargill	Southland	Penny Simmonds	National
Kaikōura	Marlborough and Canterbury	Stuart Smith	National
Kaipara ki Mahurangi	Auckland	Chris Penk	National
Kelston	Auckland	Carmel Sepuloni	Labour
Mana	Wellington	Barbara Edmonds	Labour
Māngere	Auckland	Lemauga Lydia Sosene	Labour
Manurewa	Auckland	Arena Williams	Labour
Maungakiekie	Auckland	Greg Fleming	National
Mt Albert	Auckland	Helen White	Labour
Mt Roskill	Auckland	Carlos Cheung	National
Napier	Hawke's Bay	Katie Nimon	National
Nelson	Nelson and Tasman	Rachel Boyack	Labour
New Lynn	Auckland	Paulo Garcia	National
New Plymouth	Taranaki	David MacLeod	National
North Shore	Auckland	Simon Watts	National
Northcote	Auckland	Dan Bidois	National
Northland	Northland	Grant McCallum	National
Ōhāriu	Wellington	Greg O'Connor	Labour
Ōtaki	Wellington and Manawatū-Whanganui	Tim Costley	National
Pakuranga	Auckland	Simeon Brown	National
Palmerston North	Manawatū-Whanganui	Tangi Utikere	Labour
Panmure-Ōtāhuhu	Auckland	Jenny Salesa	Labour
Papakura	Auckland	Judith Collins	National
Port Waikato	Auckland and Waikato	Andrew Bayly	National
Rangitata	Canterbury	James Meager	National
Rangitīkei	Manawatū-Whanganui	Suze Redmayne	National
Remutaka	Wellington	Chris Hipkins	Labour
Rongotai	Wellington and the Chatham Islands	Julie Anne Genter	Green
Rotorua	Bay of Plenty	Todd McClay	National
Selwyn	Canterbury	Nicola Grigg	National
Southland	Southland and Otago	Joseph Mooney	National
Taieri	Otago	Ingrid Leary	Labour
Takanini	Auckland	Rima Nakhle	National
Tāmaki	Auckland	Brooke van Velden	ACT
Taranaki-King Country	Taranaki and Waikato	Barbara Kuriger	National
Taupō	Waikato	Louise Upston	National
Tauranga	Bay of Plenty	Sam Uffindell	National
Te Atatū	Auckland	Phil Twyford	Labour
Tukituki	Hawke's Bay	Catherine Wedd	National
Upper Harbour	Auckland	Cameron Brewer	National
Waikato	Waikato	Tim van de Molen	National
Waimakariri	Canterbury	Matt Doocey	National
Wairarapa	Wellington, Manawatū-Whanganui and Hawke's Bay	Mike Butterick	National
Waitaki	Otago and Canterbury	Miles Anderson	National
Wellington Central	Wellington	Tamatha Paul	Green
West Coast-Tasman	West Coast and Tasman	Maureen Pugh	National
Whanganui	Manawatū-Whanganui and Taranaki	Carl Bates	National
Whangaparāoa	Auckland	Mark Mitchell	National
Whangārei	Northland	Shane Reti	National
Wigram	Canterbury	Megan Woods	Labour

=== Māori electorates ===
Electorate	Region	MP	Party
Te Tai Tokerau	Northland and Auckland	Mariameno Kapa-Kingi	Independent
Tāmaki Makaurau	Auckland	Oriini Kaipara	Māori
Hauraki-Waikato	Auckland and Waikato	Hana-Rawhiti Maipi-Clarke	Māori
Waiariki	Bay of Plenty and Waikato	Rawiri Waititi	Māori
Ikaroa-Rāwhiti	Hawke's Bay, Gisborne, Manawatū-Whanganui and Wellington	Cushla Tangaere-Manuel	Labour
Te Tai Hauāuru	Taranaki, Waikato, Manawatū-Whanganui and Wellington	Debbie Ngarewa-Packer	Māori
Te Tai Tonga	The South Island, Wellington and the Chatham Islands	Tākuta Ferris	Independent

== See also ==
- Opinion polling for the 2023 New Zealand general election
- Politics of New Zealand
