= Summary Offences (Move-on Orders) Amendment Act 2026 =

New Zealand legislation

New Zealand Parliament
- Royal assent: 25 September 2026
- Commenced: 26 October 2026
- Administered by: New Zealand Police

Legislative history
- Introduced by: Paul Goldsmith
- First reading: 21 May 2026
- Second reading: 15 September 2026
- Third reading: 18 September 2026

Related legislation
- Summary Offences Act 1981
- Status: Current legislation

The Summary Offences (Move-on Orders) Amendment Act 2026 is a New Zealand Act of Parliament that amends the Summary Offences Act 1981 to enable the New Zealand Police to issue "move-on orders" to manage low-level disorderly behaviour including homelessness, begging and protests. The bill passed its third reading on 18 September 2026, and received royal assent on 25 September. The Act's move-on orders came into effect on 26 October.

== Key provisions ==
The Summary Offences (Move-on Orders) Amendment Act 2026 amends the Summary Offences Act 1981 to empower the New Zealand Police to issue "move-on orders" for a range of disorderly and disruptive behaviour including obstructing entry to a trade or business, breaching the peace, begging, rough sleeping and other activities showing an intention to inhabit a public space. The bill also gives the Police additional powers to detain individuals for obtaining biographical details such as names in order to issue a move-on order.

The bill also creates two new offences. The first offence would be individuals facing or refusing to remain at the place where they are detained, refusing to provide biographical details, or providing misleading information to Police. This offence would carry a maximum fine of $500. The second offence would be knowingly refusing to comply with a move-on order without reasonable excuse. This offence would carry either a three months prison term or a fine not exceeding $2,000. The final version of the bill limits the scope of move-on orders to individuals aged 18 years and above, and also excludes freedom camping.

== Legislative history ==
=== Introduction ===
On 22 February 2026, the Justice Minister Paul Goldsmith and Police Minister Mark Mitchell confirmed that the Sixth National Government would amend the Summary Offences Act 1981 to empower Police to issue move-on orders for people engaging in disorderly behaviour, obstructing someone entering their business, begging and rough sleeping. These move-on orders would require people to leave a specific area for at least 24 hours. The Government initially proposed applying the move-on orders to persons aged 14 and above. Goldsmith said that the move-on orders were intended to address disruptive behaviour in urban centres that intimidated businesses, residents and tourists. In response, the opposition Labour Party's Auckland spokesperson Carmel Sepuloni said that move-on orders would not fix homelessness and described "slapping fines or threatening the homeless with imprisonment as disgraceful."

The Move-on Orders bill was introduced into Parliament by Goldsmith on 14 May 2026. On 18 May, the Attorney General Chris Bishop acknowledged that aspects of the legislation violated the rights and freedoms of New Zealanders under the New Zealand Bill of Rights Act 1990.

On 21 May, the Summary Offences (Move-on Orders) Amendment Bill passed its first reading. While the governing National and its coalition partners ACT and New Zealand First supported the bill, it was opposed by the opposition Labour, Green parties and Te Pāti Māori. While Goldsmith, ACT MP Simon Court and NZ First MP Casey Costello argued the bill would helped Police deal with disorderly and disruptive behaviour, opposition MPs including Labour's deputy leader Carmel Sepuloni, Green MP Tamatha Paul and Labour MP Willie Jackson argued that it would criminalise homelessness.

=== Select committee ===
The Summary Offences (Move-on Orders) Amendment Bill was subsequently referred to the Justice select committee on 21 May. While Goldsmith wanted the select committee to report back on the bill by 3 September 2026, Green MP Lawrence Xu-Nan proposed that the select committee report should be delayed until 22 September (two days prior to the dissolution of the 54th New Zealand Parliament) due to a Section 7 report by Attorney-General Bishop finding that removing rough sleepers and beggars were unjustified. Similarly, Labour MP Duncan Webb unsuccessfully tabled an amendment preventing the committee from meeting while Parliament was sitting.

The Justice select committee was chaired by National Party MP Andrew Bayly until 1 July 2026, who was subsequently succeeded by fellow National MP Tom Rutherford. Other members of the select committee included National MPs Carl Bates, Paulo Garcia (from 1 July), Rima Nakhle, ACT MP Todd Stephenson, NZ First MP Jamie Arbuckle, Labour MPs Camilla Belich, Dan Rosewarne, Duncan Webb, Green MP Lawrence Xu-Nan and independent MP Tākuta Ferris. In addition, Green MP Tamatha Paul participated in the Move-on Orders bill's consideration.

==== Submissions ====
The Move-on Orders bill received 7,618 submissions; with 98% of submitters opposing the bill and only one percent support it. Opponents objected to the bill on moral orders including its alleged "disproportionate offences and penalty regime," and inconsistency with human rights and legislative frameworks. They also contented that the move-on orders would have limited effectiveness and operational efficiency. Supporters contended that the bill would address a perceived lack of public safety caused by anti-social behaviour which disrupted businesses and daily live. Groups opposing the Move-on Orders on the grounds of human rights and social welfare included the New Zealand Law Society, the Human Rights Commission, the Salvation Army's Social Policy & Parliamentary Unit, Lifewise NZ and the Auckland City Mission. Notable individuals opposing the proposed Move-on Orders bill on human rights and welfare grounds included Children's Commissioner Claire Achmad, retired Judge Tony Fitzgerald and lawyer Danielle LeGallais.

The New Zealand Police Association (NZPA) expressed concerns that the proposed Move-on Orders would force police to manage complex social issues including homelessness, addiction, mental health issues and poverty without addressing their cause. They also expressed concern that children as young as 14 would be adversely affected by the Move-on Orders without receiving support. Retail NZ's chief executive Carolyn Young said the bill gave Police the tools needed for addressed disruptive, disorderly and threatening behaviour but expressed disagreement with provisions targeting begging and rough sleeping. She said that the proposed Move-on Orders did not address the causes of homelessness but would instead move them to different areas. Similarly, the Auckland Council opposed the inclusion of rough sleeping and begging under the Move-on Orders' behaviour criteria but said that the bill could be use to address anti-social or disorderly behaviour without making arrests.

==== Amendments ====
In response to submissions and a report by the Attorney-General on concerns that the proposed legislation breached the New Zealand Bill of Rights Act 1990, the justice select committee made several amendments to the Move-on Orders bill including narrowing the legislation's scope to protect the freedoms of expression and movement, inserting a definition of "begging," tightening the grounds for issuing "move-on orders" from begging to so-called "unreasonable begging," and excluding teenagers aged between 14 and 17 years and freedom campers from move-on orders. They also lowered penalties for breaching move-on orders such as fines.

Despite supporting the Move-on Orders, ACT leader David Seymour agreed with opposition parties' concerns about teenagers being subject to the Move-on Orders and successfully lobbied Goldsmith into raising the age threshold to 18 years. The opposition Labour and Green members of the Justice select committee issued dissenting reports opposing the Move-on Orders on the grounds that they did not address the causes of homelessness in New Zealand, breached human rights legislation, punished homeless people, and were impractical to enforce. Both parties also opposed the inclusion of teenagers aged between 14 and 17 years within the move-on orders. Following feedback, the justice select committee limited the scope of people subject to move-on orders to adults aged 18 years and above.

=== Final stages ===
The Move-on Orders bill passed its second reading and Committee of the Whole House stages on 15 September 2026. During the legislative process, the Green MPs including Tamatha Paul unsuccessfully tabled 34 amendment papers in an attempt to blunt the legislation. Paul had proposed requiring the Ministry of Social Development to provide assistance to everyone affected by Move-on Orders.

On 18 September, the bill passed its third and final reading. While the governing National, ACT and New Zealand First parties supported the bill, it was opposed by the opposition Labour, Green and Māori parties. During the final debate, Goldsmith rejected opposition arguments that the Move-on Orders would criminalise homelessness, arguing that they simply provided Police an additional tool for dealing with disorderly behaviour in public spaces. He said that only people refusing the move-on orders would face prosecution and that a move-on order is not a criminal charge. By contrast, Paul criticised the Government for rejecting a Green amendment requiring the Ministry of Social Development to assist people affected by move-on orders and said that the bill would criminalise homelessness.

The bill received royal assent on 25 September 2026. Following the bill's passage into law, Labour's housing spokesperson Kieran McAnulty said that his party would remove rough sleeping and begging from the bill entirely. The Greens, Te Pāti Māori and Opportunity Party also announced that they would repeal the Move-on Orders legislation if elected into government.

== Implementation ==
On 26 October, the Move-on Orders came into effect. Retail NZ chief executive Carolyn Young said that the industry body would monitor the effects of these orders. While welcoming the legislation as a tool for dealing with disorderly behaviour, she expressed concern that the move-on orders would merely relocate troublemakers rather than addressing the causes of disorderly behaviour and homelessness. In response to Retail NZ's skepticism of the Move-on Orders, Police Minister Mark Mitchell said that disorderly behaviour was a problem affecting many of the industry group's members.

By 3 November, Assistant commissioner Tusha Penny confirmed that Police had issued 29 Move-on Orders including 19 for disorderly, intimidating and threatening behaviour. At that time, no Move-on Orders had been issued for unreasonable begging or rough sleeping. Most of the orders were issued in the Wellington Region, followed by the Auckland and Canterbury Regions. According to Newstalk ZB broadcaster Heather du Plessis-Allan, only four orders were issued for homelessness; with at least one individual being provided with food by Police. The National Party has expressed support for reviewing the effectiveness of the legislation in three years time.

== Responses ==
In February 2026, the New Zealand Council for Civil Liberties opposed the proposed Move-on orders bill on the grounds that it violated the New Zealand Bill of Rights and punished homeless people, describing it as an "overreaction." Similar criticism of the bill was echoed by the Māori public health organisation Hāpai Te Hauora, which argued that the proposed bill did not address the causes of homelessness and would criminalise many Māori youth and children.

Following the Move-on Orders bill's first reading in May 2026, 31 Auckland faith leaders and clergy including Reverend Cate Thorn of St Matthew-in-the-City issued an open letter criticising the proposed bill as the wrong solution for addressing homelessness and poverty. On 15 June 2026, the University of Otago's Public Health Communication Centre (PHCC) opposed the bill on the grounds that it would criminalise homeless young people and urged the Justice select committee to reject the bill. The PHCC urged the New Zealand Government to instead focus on providing safe housing for vulnerable young people.

In early September 2026 Auckland City Missioner Helen Robinson and Manaaki Rangatahi Waikato regional coordinator Danielle Marks welcomed the Justice select committee's decision to exclude teenagers aged between 14 and 17 years from the Move-on Orders but opposed the bill's provisions targeting begging and rough sleeping. Similarly, the Wellington City Mission expressed disappointed that the bill would proceed into its second and third readings without changes to its rough sleeping provisions.

After the Move-on Orders came into effect on 26 October 2026, Aaron Hendry, youth social worker and head of youth organisation Kick Back, described them as "cruel and dangerous." He attributed the spike in homelessness in New Zealand to several government policies including tightening the criteria for emergency housing eligibility and the Ministry of Social Development's Work and Income division turning away people seeking help. In response to the legislation and the upcoming 2026 New Zealand general election, Kick Back released 12 steps to addressing youth homelessness including repealing the Move-on Orders. In early November 2026, Wellington City Missioner Murray Edridge praised Police for minimising the potential harm of the legislation by focusing on drunk and disorderly behaviour but called for the homelessness and begging provisions to be removed in a law change.
