= Francisco Hernandez (politician) =

New Zealand politician (born 1990 or 1991)

Francisco Hernandez MP
- Hernandez in 2026

Member of the New Zealand Parliament for Green party list
- Incumbent
- Assumed office 7 May 2024
- Preceded by: James Shaw

Personal details
- Born: 1990 or 1991 (age 34–35) Manila, Philippines
- Party: Green (2014–present)
- Other political affiliations: Labour (2008–2014)
- Education: University of Otago
- Hernandez's voice recorded July 2024

Francisco Bagkus Hernandez (born 1990 or 1991) is a New Zealand politician, representing the Green Party of Aotearoa New Zealand as a Member of Parliament since 7 May 2024.

== Early life ==
Hernandez was born in Manila, Philippines and moved to Wellington with his family when he was 12. His father, Rossano Hernandez, had been a politician aligned with Joseph Estrada and left the Philippines with his family after the fall of the Estrada administration in 2001. His family moved to Auckland after a brief stint in Wellington and he attended Liston College. Francisco Hernandez graduated from the University of Otago with a Bachelor of Arts in politics and a Master of Entrepreneurship. During 2023, he was studying a master's degree in economics.

== Political career ==
Hernandez enrolled with the Labour Party in 2008 when he began studying at Otago, before joining the Green Party in 2014. Hernandez was president of the Otago University Students' Association (OUSA) in 2013, and previously held positions on the OUSA executive in 2011 and 2012.

In the 2013 local elections, he unsuccessfully ran for a councillor position at Dunedin City Council and, subsequently, for head of the New Zealand Union of Students' Associations (NZUSA). In the 2016 local elections, he unsuccessfully stood for a position on the Henderson-Massey Local Board.

After leaving university in 2014, he began working as a Green Party parliamentary staffer and policy advisor, before joining the Climate Change Commission to work on sustainable waste usage. He served as chief climate change advisor for the Otago Regional Council before entering parliament.

=== Entry into Parliament ===
New Zealand Parliament
Years	Term	Electorate	List	Party
2024–2026	54th	List	17	Green
2026–present	55th	List	10	Green

Hernandez was announced as the Green Party's Dunedin candidate for the 2023 general election on 3 February 2023. His campaign helped build party support in his constituency, where the Green Party took second place in the party vote. However, his list placement was not sufficient to make it into parliament. In 2024 he entered parliament following the retirement of James Shaw. Initially Lawrence Xu-Nan was set to be Shaw's replacement, however Xu-Nan entered parliament sooner than expected after the sudden death of Efeso Collins. Following Shaw's resignation, Hernandez became a Member of Parliament on 6 May 2024.

=== Parliamentary career ===
Following his entry to Parliament, Hernandez was appointed to the petitions select committee as the Green member and designated as the party spokesperson for Public Services, Tertiary Education and Emergency Management and Recovery and was later designated as the party spokesperson for Regulation, Statistics and Science, Innovation and Technology. In November 2024 he was named on The Post's 'Parliament backbenchers to watch' and in December 2025 he was named The Post's "Rookie on the rise" in parliament.

During the 2026 New Zealand general election, Hernandez was ranked tenth on the Green Party list. He contested the Dunedin electorate. On 7 November, Hernandez came second in the Dunedin contest, gaining 7,370 votes based on preliminary results. He was re-elected to Parliament on the Green Party list.

== Personal life ==
Hernandez is Catholic.

== Views and positions ==
=== Political views ===
Hernandez identified himself as a "market-socialist" in his parliamentary maiden speech.
