= Nelson Tenths =

New Zealand's longest-standing legal dispute (1840s–2025)

The Nelson Tenths was New Zealand's longest-standing legal dispute. After 180 years, it was resolved in 2025 through a settlement between the Crown and Te Tau Ihu Māori. In August 2026, the New Zealand Parliament passed legislation entrenching the Nelson Tenths settlement into law.

== History ==
When the New Zealand Company bought land from Māori landowners in the wider Nelson region in the 1840s, it was agreed that 10% of the land would remain in Māori ownership. This gave the dispute its name: Nelson Tenths. Less than 3,000 acres (1,200 ha) were reserved and protected, when it should have been 15,100 acres (6,100 ha) that were to remain in Māori ownership. The land is question is located in the wider Nelson area and covers what is today administered by Nelson City and Tasman District.

To address the injustice, Wakatū Incorporation was established by order in council in 1977, so that the original landowners had an organisation that could receive land from the Crown. Once established, the Crown handed back some 1,393.72 ha (3,444.0 acres) of land in December 1977. The Crown had held the land since 1882 through the Public Trustee since 1882, and from 1921 through the Māori Trust Office. Wakatū Incorporation held the land in trust and issued shares, which were distributed between 2374 initial owners.

Rore Stafford first raised the Nelson Tenths with the Crown in 1986. In 2010, Stafford filed legal action, which eventually made its way to the Supreme Court. The Supreme Court ruled in 2017 that the Crown had a duty to provide the Nelson Tenths to the customary owners, and referred the case back to the High Court. The High Court found in 2024 that the land held by the Crown for Māori had all along belonged to the customary owners, with significant monetary compensation due to be paid. Both the Crown and the plaintiff appealed or lodged a cross-appeal. In August 2025, the parties entered into confidential negotiations. By mid-December, an agreement was signed, with the Crown returning an additional 7,583 acres (3,069 ha) of land to Te Tau Ihu Māori, and a payment of NZ$420 million for the shortfall in land.

On 18 August 2026, the New Zealand Parliament passed legislation entrenching the Nelson Tenths settlement into law.
