= Darleen Tana =

New Zealand environmental scientist and former politician

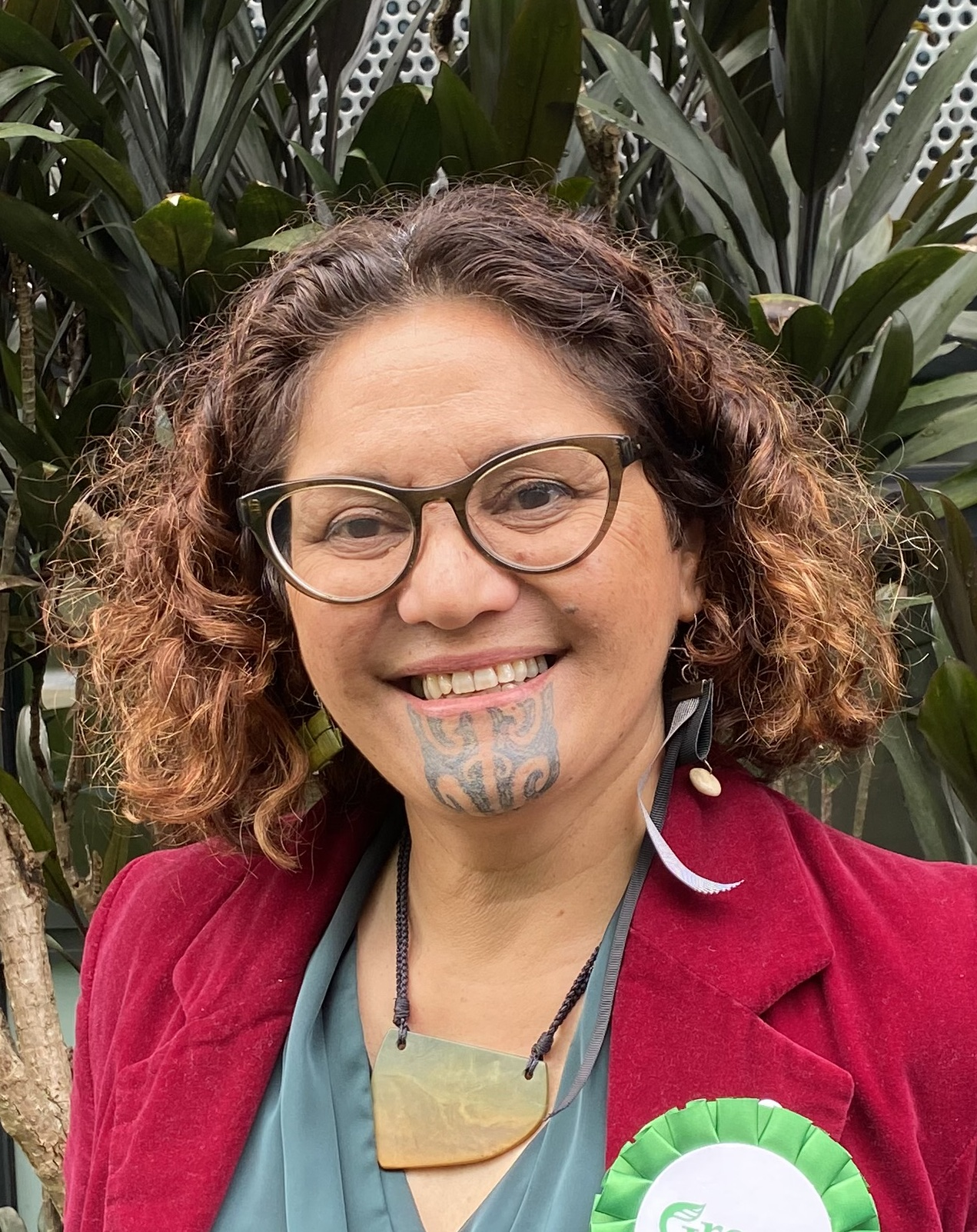
- Tana in 2023

Member of the New Zealand Parliament for Green, then Independent party list
- In office 14 October 2023 – 22 October 2024
- Succeeded by: Benjamin Doyle

Personal details
- Born: Northland, New Zealand
- Party: Independent (6 July 2024 – 22 October 2024); Green (14 October 2023 – 6 July 2024)
- Spouse: Christian Hoff-Nielsen (sep. 2024)
- Website: NZ Parliament Profile of Darleen Tana

Darleen Sheree Tana Hoff-Neilsen is a New Zealand businessperson, and former politician. Tana was elected to represent the Green Party of Aotearoa New Zealand as a member of Parliament in the 2023 New Zealand general election. On 8 July 2024, she (Note: While Tana had previously indicated that she used they/them pronouns, Tana's counsel told the High Court at Auckland on 29 August 2024 that she uses she/her pronouns.) resigned from the Green Party following an investigation into her conduct and allegations of involvement in migrant exploitation. Tana subsequently sat as an independent member of Parliament until her expulsion under waka-jumping legislation.

== Early life and career ==
Tana was born in Northland. She is of Ngāpuhi, Ngāti Porou, Ngā Rauru and Te Āti Awa, Ngāti Kahungunu ki Wairarapa descent. She grew up with Māori language around her in a marae setting. Her experiences growing up in Northland include gathering shellfish at the beach and Waitangi Day celebrations.

Tana went to Bay of Islands College in Kawakawa and then to Whangārei Girls' High School (in Whangārei). She became an environmental scientist, with a Bachelor of Chemical Technology from Massey University; she worked in an environmental science role at Horizons Regional Council early on in her career.

Tana received a Rotary Foundation scholarship to study abroad, where she earned a Master of Business Administration from Solvay International Business School. She held senior roles as Expert Program Manager and Head of Talent Management in corporate telecommunications in Brussels before returning to New Zealand in 2013. Tana speaks Māori, English, Danish, Flemish and French.

Tana and her husband Christian Hoff-Nielsen founded e-mobility firm Bikes and Beyond. The business started in 2013 initially on Waiheke Island before expanding to other locations. On Waiheke Tana has also been involved in the Kelp Gardeners Project as part of the Waiheke Marine Project, the former of which takes an indigenous-informed approach to marine care.

== Political career ==
New Zealand Parliament
Years	Term	Electorate	List	Party
2023–2024	54th	List	13	Green
2024	Changed allegiance to:			Independent

In the 2020 general election she stood in the Northland electorate, where she came fourth with 1,749 votes.

Tana contested Tāmaki Makaurau in the 2023 election. She was thirteenth on the national list. Her campaign was supported by Marama Davidson, the co-leader of the Green Party who had previously contested the electorate. While third place in her electorate, Tana was elected as a list member for the Greens based on the party vote.

Tana said she sought to ensure that the government "gets real on climate action, regenerates our taiao (environment), and removes the shackles of a system that is designed to keep us poor, without means, or on a fast track to jail". She spoke in support of the party's Hoki Whenua Mai policy, which seeks to return historic land to Māori.

In late November 2023, Tana assumed the Green Party's oceans and fisheries, science, innovation and technology, small business and manufacturing, media and communications, digitising government, internal affairs, and overseas New Zealanders spokesperson portfolios.

During the Gaza war, Tana attended a Palestinian solidarity rally in November 2023 where she joined fellow Green MPs Chlöe Swarbrick, Ricardo Menéndez March and Steve Abel in chanting "From the river to the sea, Palestine will be free."

=== 2024 allegations of misconduct ===
On 15 March 2024 Tana was suspended by the Green Party and stood down from her small business portfolio after allegations of migrant exploitation relating to two workers including an Argentine man who complained about unpaid wages while working at Bikes and Beyond. The case is currently before the Employment Relations Authority. In response, former Alliance Party MP Matt Robson and political commentator Trish Sherson said that the Green Party's perceived slow response to Tana's migrant exploitation allegations could affect the Green Party's public image and credibility.

The Green Party engaged barrister Rachel Burt to carry out an independent investigation into Tana's conduct, after becoming aware of allegations that she had some prior knowledge of the allegations against her. On 20 May, RNZ reported that the Green Party's investigation into Tana had cost NZ$43,000 to date. The funding came from the Green Party's leaders' budget, which is sourced from the Parliamentary Service.

On 21 June 2024, Stuff reported that one of the complainants had alleged that Tana had told him he was allowed to work in Tana's husband's bike shop despite his seasonal work visa limiting his work to horticulture and viticulture jobs. The worker also alleged that Tana advised him to work in the shop during a COVID-19 lockdown on the grounds it was essential work. On 24 June, the Electoral Commission referred Tana and the publishers of Verve Magazine to Police for allegedly failing to include a promoter statement in an election advertisement published in May 2023.

=== Resignation from Green Party ===
On 8 July 2024, Tana resigned from the Green Party following the conclusion of the investigation into her conduct. Swarbrick, as party co-leader, said Tana's conduct had fallen short of expectations and that her actions were "completely at odds with our party’s values, policies and kaupapa". Tana was asked by the party to resign as a member of Parliament.

In response, Tana released a media statement claiming that "natural justice had not been followed" and disputing the report of the independent report into allegations of migrant exploitation. By contrast Alex Kersjes and Nathan Santesso, lawyers for the former bike shop workers, stated that their clients felt "vindicated" and "exonerated" by the report. On 9 July, Kersjes said that one worker's income taxes had not been paid and urged Tana and her husband to pay the money that was owed to their former employees. New Zealand First leader and Deputy Prime Minister Winston Peters called for the Greens to use the waka-jumping legislation to expel Tana from Parliament.

During an interview with 1News on 15 July 2024, Tana stated she was considering whether to resign from Parliament. Tana also denied exploiting migrant workers and expressed an openness to working with her former Green Party colleagues. Tana also criticised the independent investigation for allegedly choosing to interview people who "did not have direct relationship to the events and could only offer hearsay." Tana also said that she believed that the Green Party had formed a predetermined view prior to the report's release. She attributed a delay in reporting the migrant exploitation allegations to the party to a busy Waitangi Day weekend where she was on "tea towel duty".

On 17 July, the Green Party released the executive summary of Rachel Burt's independent report into Tana's migrant exploitation allegations. The report found that Tana played a major role in running her husband's bicycle shop business and had been aware of the allegations prior to standing as a Green Party candidate. That same day, the New Zealand Companies Register confirmed that Tana's husband's business E Cycles NZ Limited had gone into liquidation, with the consulting firm Khov Jones being appointed as liquidators. The business's Newmarket branch was temporarily closed while the Waiheke store was auctioned on online auction website TradeMe. By 23 July, Stuff reported that E Cycles NZ Limited owed the Inland Revenue Department and other creditors over NZ$400,000. By that time, liquidators had secured the company's three stores and conducted stock takes.

On 23 July, Tana returned to Parliament as an independent, stating "I'm here now and doing the mahi, for as long as this place will allow me." Tana confirmed she had not made any contact with the Green Party following the release of the independent report's summary. On this date, Tana also stated that she used they/them pronouns, stating to Stuff that this is because "I never walk alone". In a court hearing on 29 August 2024, however, Tana's counsel informed the Court that Tana uses she/her pronouns.

On 28 July, Green Party members attending the party's annual general meeting in Christchurch agreed to support a caucus proposal to hold a special general meeting on 1 September 2024 to decide on whether the party should use the "waka-jumping" legislation to expel Tana from Parliament. Three senior members of the Green's Pasifika network including Dunedin City Council member Marie Laufiso, Alofa Aiono and Vasemaca Tavola resigned in protest at the party's treatment of Tana, saying that the party's co-leaders had "inflamed and weaponised media narratives, intentionally smearing Darleen's character, integrity and mana." They also alleged that the leaders' plans to invoke waka-jumping legislation were motivated by budgetary considerations rather than Tana's alleged exploitation of migrant workers. The trio also issued a joint letter claiming that Māori and Pasifika members of the party including Tana and former Green MP Elizabeth Kerekere had been mistreated and sidelined by the leadership. By contrast, former Green MPs Sue Bradford and Eugenie Sage defended the Green Party's response including the invocation of waka jumping legislation.

On 20 August, Tana released a letter rejecting her party's co-leaders calls on her to resign. She rejected the Green Party's assertion that she was distorting Parliament's proportionality and criticised the Green Party for going against its long-standing position against invoking the waka-jumping act, stating that "invoking in this particular case will lead to a chilling of possible dissent across the Party." Tana also claimed that several Green Party members and non-members had encouraged her to remain in Parliament as an independent MP. In response, Labour Party leader Chris Hipkins said that Tana's refusal to resign was distorting Parliament's proportionality and expressed support for the Greens taking action to expel her from Parliament.

On 28 August, Tana filed for an interim junction at the Auckland High Court seeking to block the Green Party's special general meeting in September 2024 along with a judicial review of Swarbrick, Davidson and the Green Party. On 29 August, lawyers for both parties announced that Tana and the Green Party had agreed to an interim injunction ahead of a full hearing for the injunction application at the Auckland High Court on 12 September. The special member's meeting scheduled for 1 September was also cancelled.

On 12 September, the hearing for a judicial review of Swarbrick, Davidson and the Greens' decision to expel Tana was held at the Auckland High Court. Tana's lawyer Sharyn Green argued the Green Party had failed to follow its own constitution and charter when it asked Tana to resign from the party and Parliament. Green argued that Tana had been denied a presumption of innocence by her party during the independent investigation, citing the removal of her profile from the Green Party's website and not being invited to former co-leader James Shaw's valedictory speech during her suspension. In response, the Green Party's lawyer Tim Smith argued that there was no evidence that Tana had been forced to resign before she left the Green Party. Smith argued that Tana was attempting to abdicate responsibility for her resignation to avoid being expelled from Parliament under the waka jumping legislation. He also argued that the Green Party had followed due process under the MP code of conduct. Judge David Johnstone heard the judicial review and reserved his decision. On 20 September the court determined that the Green party followed the rules of their party constitution while conducting the investigation and asking for Tana's resignation.

In late September 2024, Swarbrick announced that the Greens would hold a special meeting on 17 October to decide whether to expel Tana from Parliament using the waka-jumping legislation. In mid-October, Tana appealed the High Court ruling upholding the Green Party's proceedings to expel her from Parliament. In response, Swarbrick said that the appeal would not affect the special meeting scheduled for 17 October. At that meeting 185 party delegates voted to support the use of the legislation by an overwhelming consensus. On 22 October, House Speaker Gerry Brownlee revoked Tana's ability to attend Parliament and expelled her using the Electoral (Integrity) Amendment Act 2018. She ceased to be an MP immediately following this announcement. In response to the ruling, Tana maintained her innocence but said she respected the speaker's decision due to the waka-jumping law.

In July 2024, Green Dunedin City Councilor Marie Laufiso, in a collective action with fellow Pasifika members of the Green Party Alofa Aiono and Vasemaca Tavola, resigned from the party over the ousting of Tana from parliament. The collective said the party co-leaders had "inflamed and weaponised media narratives, intentionally smearing Darleen’s character, integrity, and mana."
