= Greyhound racing in New Zealand =

- Start date: 1948; Addington Park (Christchurch Greyhound Racing Club)
- End date: 2026

Greyhound racing in New Zealand consists of seven Greyhound racing clubs. They are all affiliated with Greyhound Racing New Zealand (GRNZ). Racing in New Zealand is governed by the New Zealand Racing Board (NZRB) in accordance with the Racing Industry Act 2020. On 10 December 2024, Minister for Racing Winston Peters announced that greyhound racing was to be banned in New Zealand and would end by 2026.

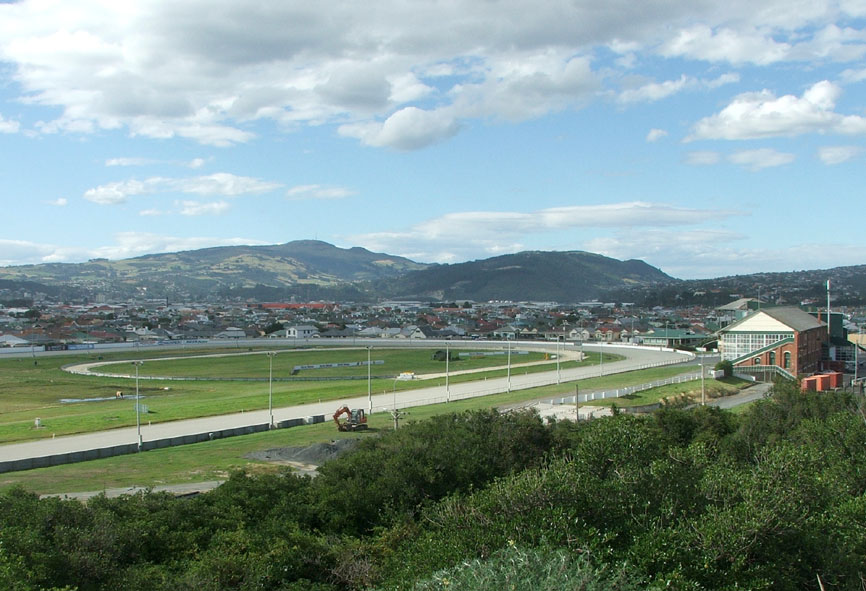
Forbury Park Raceway, home of the Otago GRC from 1979 to 2024.

== History ==
The current oval racing industry was born out of coursing which was seen at the time as a way to help control the population of hares. The first hares were brought to New Zealand in 1868 as hunting quarry but a gestation period of around 40 days resulted in problems for farmers and British greyhounds were imported to help control them. The first greyhound club in New Zealand was formed in Southland during 1876.

The New Zealand Federation of Coursing Clubs was formed in 1877 and the National Coursing Association was formed in 1908.

Experiments with artificial hares began in 1934 and the "Tin Hare" (a metal arm system on a rail around an oval track) was first officially used for a race meeting at Christchurch in 1948. This is regarded as the birth of modern greyhound racing in New Zealand. However, in 1949, the sport was refused totalisator betting by the Royal Commission on Gaming.

In 1954 the New Zealand Greyhound Racing Association (NZGRA) was formed following the ban on coursing. In March 1970, the Auckland Greyhound Club presented the Prince Philip a greyhound as a gift, which led to a significant annual race to commemorate the royal visit of Elizabeth II. In 1978, the modern oval form of racing was granted totalisator betting. Three years later in 1981 the industry was granted off-site totalisator betting and the TAB.

In 2009 the NZGRA became the GRNZ, which it is called today.

=== Abolition ===
On 10 December 2024, Minister for Racing Winston Peters announced that greyhound racing was to be banned in New Zealand, stating “The time has come to do the right thing". The sport was to be phased out gradually over 20 months to allow time to rehome the estimated 2900 racing dogs. Legislation was passed through all stages under urgency that day, with unanimous support, to prevent any unnecessary killing of racing dogs as the result of the announcement.

In the 2024/2025 racing season, 17 dogs were killed and more than 800 were injured, including 114 with broken bones.

On 20 August 2025, Cabinet agreed to draft legislation abolishing the greyhound racing industry in New Zealand. The industry initiated judicial review proceedings challenging the ban, but this review request was subsequently withdrawn.

On 2 April 2026, Parliament passed the Racing Industry (Closure of Greyhound Racing Industry) Amendment Act 2026, which enacted the legislative framework for phasing out greyhound racing by 1 August 2026. The bill also established a transitional agency to facilitate the phasing out of the greyhound racing industry and rehome the dogs.

== Organisation ==
Greyhound racing in New Zealand is organised through GRNZ, with seven affiliated racing clubs located in Auckland, Waikato, Whanganui, Palmerston North, Canterbury, Otago and Southland. The industry operates under the Racing Industry Act 2020, with integrity oversight provided by the Racing Integrity Board (RIB). In 2025, there were approximately 2,500 greyhounds registered with GRNZ.

== Criticism ==
In 2013, following concern over the welfare of racing greyhounds, the Greyhound Racing Association (NZGRA) initiated an Independent Welfare Review from WHK, released in June 2013. The review found little evidence of issues involving the care of greyhounds during their racing careers, but found issues with population management. The lack of transparency, along with reported levels of euthanasia, led the review team to consider the current situation “not sustainable”.

In 2014, GRNZ stopped making its injury statistics publicly available because it claimed its critics were using them to "manipulate the facts". Statistics released by GRNZ showed that between late 2012 and April 2014, 92 dogs suffered serious injuries on the track and 64 were euthanised. GRNZ stated that this only represents "0.00017% of 53,760 starters", with Aaron Cross rebutting that referring to 'race starters' is a method of bloating figures wherein "death and injury rates are diluted". In 2016, a top trainer claimed poor track conditions were putting greyhound lives at risk.

In 2017, after GRNZ did not resume regular progress reporting as requested by Associate Agriculture Minister Meka Whaitiri, a second review was commissioned by the NZRB, led by former High Court Judge Rodney Hansen. Judge Hanson made 20 recommendations to further advance the welfare of greyhounds. The report found that 77% of trainers had had a healthy greyhound euthanised and that 1,447 greyhounds were reported as euthanised over the 2013/14 – 2016/17 seasons. The report noted evidence "suggesting the true figure is much higher", with 1,271 dogs were unaccounted for. Hansen concluded that improvements had been made since 2013 but "have been insufficient to right the structural imbalance." In December 2017, Minister for Racing Winston Peters, said the reports findings were “disturbing and deeply disappointing” and “simply unacceptable”.

In December 2018 the New Zealand government considered a second petition from Aaron Cross and 129 others seeking a prohibition on racing. In response, the government requested that the greyhound racing industry continue to implement the Hansen recommendations and invited the NZGRA to update them on their progress

In June 2020 GRNZ submitted a final report to Rt Hon Winston Peters, declaring all recommendations successfully implemented, and that they would no longer be reporting progress. In April 2021, Minister for Racing Grant Robertson appointed the Hon Sir Bruce Robertson (no relation) to undertake a further independent review, stating that some recommendations were not fully implemented or enforced. The report identified a number of new issues since the 2017 Hansen report, in the areas of: Rehoming, Euthanasia, Database accuracy, Training, breeding and population control, Makeup of the breeding industry, Governance of the industry, and the functionality of the Health and Welfare Committee. The report states that "there can be no doubt" that the Hansen Report was taken seriously by GRNZ and changes to improve animal welfare have occurred, but also that GRNZ has unnecessarily obfuscated information and that after “ten years and a further two reports” ... “the fundamental issues within the industry remain the same”.

In June 2021 researchers at the University of Auckland published a study report finding many ex-racing greyhounds poorly equipped for rehoming.

In August 2021, a petition to ban commercial greyhound racing in Aotearoa New Zealand, signed by 38,631 people, was presented to the New Zealand Parliament. The cross-party petitions committee concluded its response by stating "We have doubts about whether the greyhound racing industry still has a social license to operate in its current form. We have serious concerns about the way the industry is operating at present."

In September 2021 the government formally put the racing industry on notice. Grant Robertson asked the RIB to assess the industry's progress against specific indicators, and report back before the end of 2022. He stated "I want to be clear today – the greyhound racing industry is on notice: either make the improvements needed or risk closure".

On 4 May 2022, Newshub reported that a trainer dropped 11 greyhounds at a rehoming kennel, with 8 having substantial injuries. The trainer, John McInerney, was New Zealand's largest greyhound trainer, with 191 racing dogs. McInerney denied that any dogs had left his kennels in that condition. On 5 May 2022, Newshub reported that the RIB had issued improvement notices to "almost all" the kennels it had visited since its inception, between 200 and 300 notices. On 13 May 2022, a third Newshub report found that Kevin Brady, a director on the board of GRNZ and the Racing Industry Unit, was co-owner of a greyhound that tested positive for methamphetamine.

In August 2022, Newstalk ZB reported that RIB inspectors had found 15 greyhounds in "squalid" and "inexcusable" conditions. The kennel was fined and banned from racing for two years.

In October 2022 Camorra Research Ltd delivered an independent review commissioned by the SPCA, to analyse public opinion towards commercial greyhound racing among the New Zealand population. Of their representative sample of New Zealanders, 9% believed that racing greyhounds have a good life, and 74.8% indicated that "given the chance, they would vote in support of a ban on greyhound racing."

In December 2022 the RIB presented its findings to Minister for Racing Kieran McAnulty. The RIB review finds improvement in ten out of fifteen areas, and concludes that progress is mixed and has not always met the RIB's expectations. It found that GRNZ had made significant progress reducing euthanasias, with 325 greyhounds being euthanised in the 2020/21 – 2021/22 seasons. 174 of these were euthanised at a single kennel belonging to "Trainer X". This licensed person was spoken with. Thereafter, that kennel only euthanised six greyhounds in the first two quarters of the 2022/23 season. The Minister requested further information, and a supplementary report was received in March 2023. The supplementary report included options for the closure of the industry.

In October 2023 both leaders of New Zealand's main political parties agreed that greyhound racing should be banned, in the TV1 leader's debate.

In November 2023 trainer John McInerney was disqualified for a year after one of his greyhounds tested positive for methamphetamine and another was mistreated. McInerney's dogs had, on previous occasions, tested positive for procaine, heptaminol, codeine, hydroxystanolozol, caffeine and ketoprofen, although the Judicial Control Authority stated that there was no malicious intent and McInerney maintained a professional kennel of the highest standard.

In an announcement on 10 December 2024, Minister for Racing Winston Peters made good on the position expressed by National Party leader Christopher Luxon, most notably during the TV1 leaders debate prior to the 2023 general election, that greyhound racing should be banned.
