= Go back to where you came from =

Insult against foreign-born individuals

"Go back to where you came from" is a racist or xenophobic command which is used in many countries against immigrants and ethnic minorities. Another common iteration of the phrase is "Go back to your country." According to American University scholar Alan Kraut, it was originally used in the United States against European immigrants. The phrase was popularized during World War I and World War II in relation to German Americans, who were subject to suspicion, discrimination, and violence. The message conveys a sense that the person is "not supposed to be there, or that it isn't their place." The speaker is presumed to be a "real" American, but the target of the remark is not.

In the contemporary United States, the epithet is often directed at Asian and Hispanic Americans, and sometimes sub-Saharan African, Arab, Jewish, and Slavic Americans. It has even been ignorantly directed towards Indigenous Americans in the US. Its use is often based on an erroneous assumption of the target's origin; for example, Hispanic and Latino Americans may be told to "Go back to Mexico," even if they are not Mexican. Under federal employment law in the United States, it has been accepted as evidence of workplace discrimination.

The phrase has also been used in other countries and languages, including Australia, Greenland, Israel, Italy, Japan, Malaysia, New Zealand, Singapore, and South Africa.

== Background ==
Such phrases are deemed by the United States federal government and the court system to be discriminatory in the workplace. Their use has been accepted as evidence of workplace discrimination in cases brought before the Equal Employment Opportunity Commission (EEOC), a federal government agency that "enforces federal law to make sure employees are not discriminated against for their gender, sex, national origin or age." EEOC documents specifically cite the use of the comment "Go back to where you came from," as the example of unlawful workplace conduct by co-workers and supervisors, along with the use of "insults, taunting, or ethnic epithets, such as making fun of a person's accent," deemed to be "harassment based on national origin."

EEOC documents defining "harassment based on national origin" specifically cite the use of the comment "Go back to where you came from", as the example of "unlawful" workplace conduct by co-workers and supervisors if its use is creates an "intimidating, hostile, or offensive working environment, interfere[s] with work performance, or negatively affect[s] job opportunities". Other "illegal" workplace behavior includes the use of "insults, taunting, or ethnic epithets, such as making fun of a person's accent".

According to a July 20, 2019, CNN article, the United States Equal Employment Opportunity Commission has used phrases, such as, "Go back to where you came from" as evidence of workplace discrimination.

== Examples ==
According to an August 31, 2003, Houston Chronicle article, a car salesman of East Indian descent who was Muslim had been hired at a Texas car dealership in May 2001. He began to be subjected to taunts by his co-workers including "go back where you came from" post 9/11. He filed a complaint with the EEOC in 2003 after he was fired from the dealership in 2002. According to CNN, in rendering their decision to side with the EEOC case on behalf of the salesman and against the car dealership accused of creating a "hostile work environment based on ... national origin and religion", the United States Court of Appeals for the Fifth Circuit "cited the example" several times of the repeated use of the phrase "just go back where [he] came from". By 2003, allegedly as part of the post-9/11 backlash, over 943 discrimination complaints were filed to the EEOC leading to over 115 lawsuits.

On July 14, 2019, President Donald Trump used the phrase to refer to four American congresswomen of color in a tweet, stating "Why don't they go back and help fix the totally broken and crime infested places from which they came...", even though three of the four are native-born Americans and all four are US citizens. The tweet drew controversy due to Donald Trump's history of racially-charged comments. According to CNN legal analyst Laura Coates, the statement, "although obviously racist to the public," may not be unlawful, because EEOC guidelines only apply to work environments and "the United States Congress and its members do not work for the President." In response to Trump's tweet, The New York Times invited readers to comment. They received accounts from 16,000 readers of their "experiences of being told to 'go back'."

== Global usage ==
=== Europe ===
Numerous articles which are related to racism in Europe cite the use of the phrase and its variations in many European countries. In 2009, a nurse who worked in a Södertälje Hospital in Sweden complained to management about the way the staff treated patients who had immigrant backgrounds, citing examples of verbal harassment such as "go back to Arabia". The nurse lost his job.

In 2008, Greenlanders were forced to flee Gellerupparken after having been subjected to racist persecution from Arab and Somali residents for years. Chants such as "Fuck home to Greenland, this is our Gellerup" was reported as being common, along with being shot at with fireworks by Arab youth.

Incidents of verbal harassment based on ethnicity in Italy include the 2018 beating of a 19-year-old man from Senegal, who had requested political asylum and was working as a server in Palermo. He was attacked by three Sicilian men and told to "Go back to your country, dirty nigger". Their actions were denounced by Monsignor Michele Pennisi, the Archbishop of Monreale, who expressed the "strongest condemnation of this act of racism, of xenophobia" that does not reflect the "attitude of Christians and of many men of good will in Sicily".

On 28 January 2020, André Ventura, leader of the Portuguese political party Chega, provoked an outcry in Parliament by saying that black Joacine Katar Moreira, a Guinea-Bissau-born Assembly member who wanted museum items from Portugal's former colonies to be returned, should be "sent back to her country of origin. It would be a lot better for everyone".

=== Africa ===
The phrase was used during the 2015 South African xenophobic riots, in which immigrants—including African expatriates from other African countries—were blamed for the high unemployment rate of South Africans. The Los Angeles Times said that South Africa's high unemployment rate has been the catalyst for violent attacks in South Africa against migrants from India, Pakistan, Bangladesh, and African countries who are blamed for "stealing jobs and undercutting small businesses owned by South Africans". There was a wave of xenophobic killings in South Africa in 2008, in which 62 people were killed.

=== Asia ===
In Malaysia, parliament members sometimes told politicians of Chinese descent to "balik Cina" (go back to China), especially if they are members of DAP.

=== Oceania ===
In 2015, New Zealand First member of parliament Ron Mark told National MP Melissa Lee to "go back to Korea" in parliament.

In September 2022, One Nation senator Pauline Hanson tweeted that Greens senator Mehreen Faruqi should "piss off back to Pakistan" after Faruqi called for an Australian republic in response to the death of Elizabeth II, whom Faruqi also referred to posthumously as "the leader of a racist empire built on stolen lives, land and wealth of colonised peoples."

In July 2026, Foreign Minister of New Zealand Winston Peters told Green MP Lawrence Xu-Nan, who was born in China but moved to New Zealand as a child in 1994, to "go back to your own country", a comment characterised by New Zealand's Race Relations Commissioner as "racist".

=== Israel/Palestine conflict ===
The phrase "Jews/Israelis go back to Europe/Poland" had been widely used in anti-Israel protests during the Gaza war, and to lesser degree before that in other places. Jo-Ann Mort of The Guardian pointed out the irony in the phrase, as the majority of the Jewish population in Israel were born in Israel. In addition, Israeli Mizrahi Jews of MENA descent outnumber Israeli Ashkenazi Jews of European descent. She (and Seth Greenland of the LA Times) also point out a further irony - that most of the Jews who actually came from Europe to the Land of Israel did it in order to flee severe persecution in Europe, where they were long regarded as the non-European other. Rusi Jaspal said that these statements are meant to deny the historical Jewish connection to Israel.

== See also ==
- Pendatang asing – Malay term which means "foreign visitor", it is also used as a pejorative term for non-Bumiputera Malays.
- Perpetual foreigner, a pejorative term for people who are not considered citizens of a particular country even though they were born in it, the use of this term has disproportionately affected Asian Americans.
- Remigration – far-right political concept of forcibly returning immigrants to their place of ethnic origin
- Rootless cosmopolitan – Soviet antisemitic slur
