= Lawrence Xu-Nan =

New Zealand politician (born 1985 or 1986)

Lawrence Xu-Nan MP
- 南西
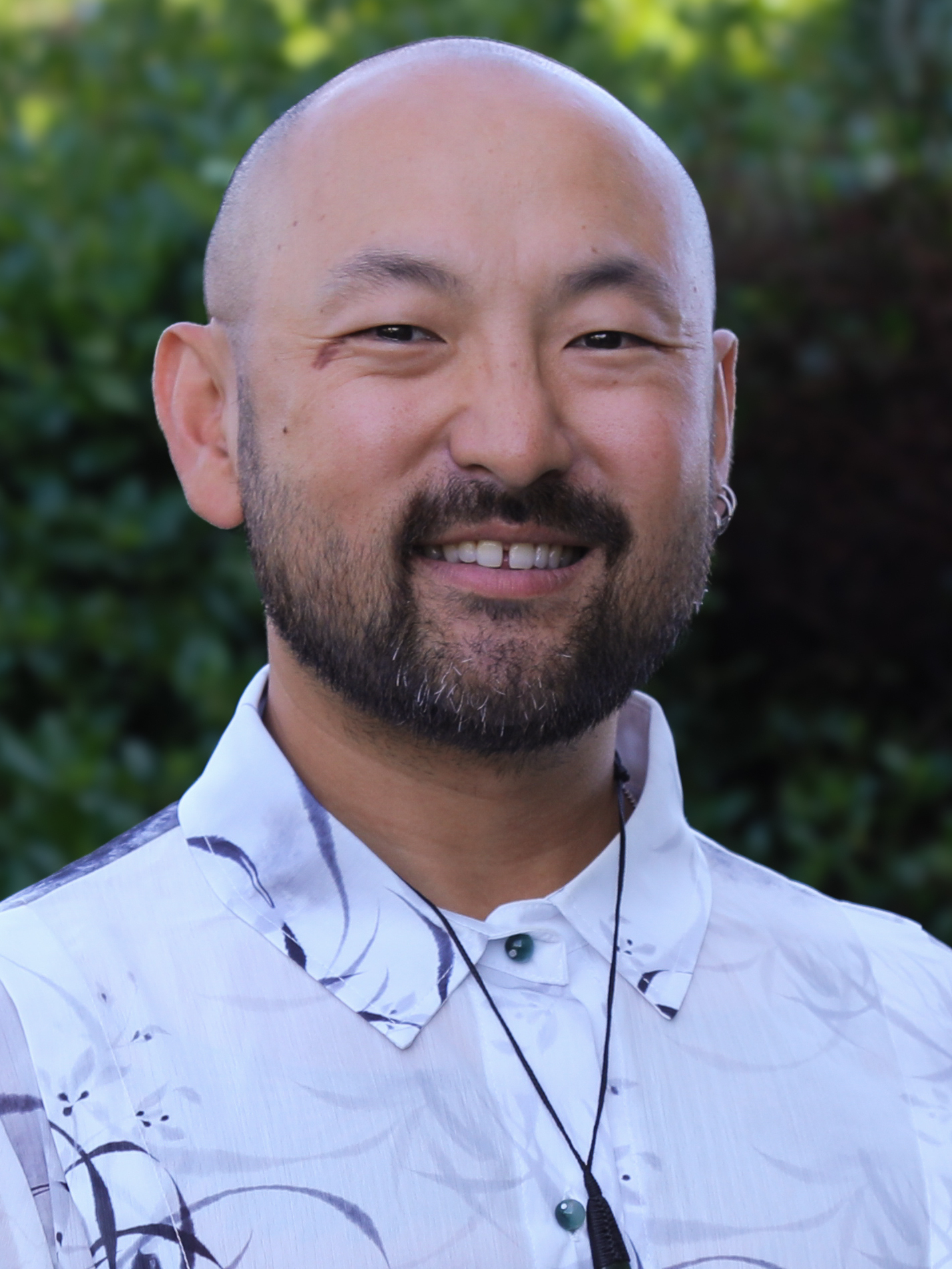
- Xu-Nan in 2026

Member of the New Zealand Parliament for Green party list
- Incumbent
- Assumed office 6 March 2024
- Preceded by: Efeso Collins (Note: Normally, list MPs do not have individual predecessors or successors, but Collins died during a sitting parliament and therefore was succeeded by Xu-Nan.)

Personal details
- Born: 12 December 1986 (age 39) Tianjin, China
- Citizenship: New Zealand
- Party: Green
- Xu-Nan's voice recorded July 2024

Academic background
- Education: University of Auckland
- Thesis: Defining the Inaros tradition: an interdisciplinary approach (2017)
- Doctoral advisor: Anthony Spalinger

Academic work
- Discipline: Ancient history
- Sub-discipline: Egyptology

Lawrence Xi Xu-Nan (Chinese: 南西; pinyin: Nán Xī) (born 12 December (Note: Xu-Nan has stated his birthday is on "the day" of the 1936 Xi'an Incident, which commenced on 12 December and is also referred to as the "Double Twelve Incident".)1986) is a New Zealand politician and member of Parliament (MP). He has served as a list MP for the Green Party since 2024.

== Early life and education ==
Lawrence Xi Xu-Nan was born in Tianjin, China, and first moved to New Zealand with his parents in 1994. After a brief return to China for primary school, his family permanently settled in Auckland in 1997 when he was 11 years old. Xu-Nan was raised by his single mother after his parents' early divorce.

Xu-Nan grew up in East Auckland, attending Pakuranga Intermediate and Pakūranga College. He then studied at the University of Auckland, completing a conjoint Bachelor of Arts and Bachelor of Science (BA/BSc) in Ancient History and Pharmacology in 2009. He continued his studies in Ancient History with a Bachelor of Arts with Honours in 2010 and a Master of Arts in 2012. He completed his studies in 2017, graduating with a PhD in Egyptology.

== Political career ==
New Zealand Parliament
Years	Term	Electorate	List	Party
2024–2026	54th	List	16	Green
2026–present	55th	List	8	Green

Xu-Nan joined the Green Party of Aotearoa New Zealand in 2017. He was the party's male policy co-convenor from 2020 to 2023 and party co-convenor from 2023.

At the 2020 general election, Xu-Nan contested the Pakuranga electorate and was placed 17th on the Green Party list. In 2023 Xu-Nan contested the Epsom electorate. He was placed 16th on the Green Party list, but was ranked too low to win a list seat at the election.

=== First term, 2024–2026 ===
Following the death of Efeso Collins on 21 February 2024, Xu-Nan was declared elected as a member of Parliament by the Electoral Commission on 6 March.

Since 2024, Xu-Nan has been the Green Party spokesperson for courts, education, ethnic communities, justice, overseas New Zealanders, seniors, and trade. Since January 2025, he has sat as a member of the justice committee.

According to The Post, Xu-Nan has the longest collective speaking time of all members of parliament since the 2023 election. It is estimated that his speaking time amounts to around 420,000 words or approximately twice the number of words in the renowned novel 'Ulysses' by James Joyce.

In July 2026, Foreign Minister Winston Peters told Xu-Nan to "go back to your own country" during a debate on the government's COVID-19 response. Peters' comments were condemned as racist and attention-seeking by New Zealand's Race Relations Commissioner Melissa Derby, Prime Minister Christopher Luxon, Labour deputy leader Carmel Sepuloni and fellow Green MP Tamatha Paul. The Chinese Ambassador Wang Xiaolong criticised Peters' remarks as a reflection of his character and the Chinese Embassy in New Zealand lodged a complaint with the Ministry of Foreign Affairs and Trade. Xu-Nan later described Peters' comments as a "desperate attempt to distract from the coalition's record" and criticised the Foreign Minister for "scapegoating" migrants. On 31 July, Luxon defended Xu-Nan's right to speak in Parliament and described Peters' comments as "very offensive and completely inappropriate." While he retained Peters as Foreign Minister, Luxon urged voters to vote for National to ensure that Cabinet seats were occupied by National MPs rather than coalition parties. On 13 October 2026, Opportunity Party leader Qiulae Wong categorically ruled out serving in a government with Peters as foreign minister, describing his comments about Xu-Nan as "clearly racist" in the TVNZ Multi-Party Debate. In the same debate, Green Party co-leader Chlöe Swarbrick described Xu-Nan as "one of the hardest working MPs in our parliament".

=== Second term, 2026– present ===
During the 2026 New Zealand general election, Xu-Nan stood in the Epsom electorate for the Greens. He was ranked eighth on the party list. Based on preliminary results, Xu-Nan came fourth place in the Epsom contest with 3,105 votes. However, he was able to return to Parliament on the Green Party list.

== Personal life ==
Xu-Nan is queer and neurodivergent. His family name is jointly taken from his father's, Xu, and his mother's, Nan. He is a fan of the game World of Warcraft and a member of the Green Party's unofficial "gamer's caucus".
