= Te Tau Ihu Māori =

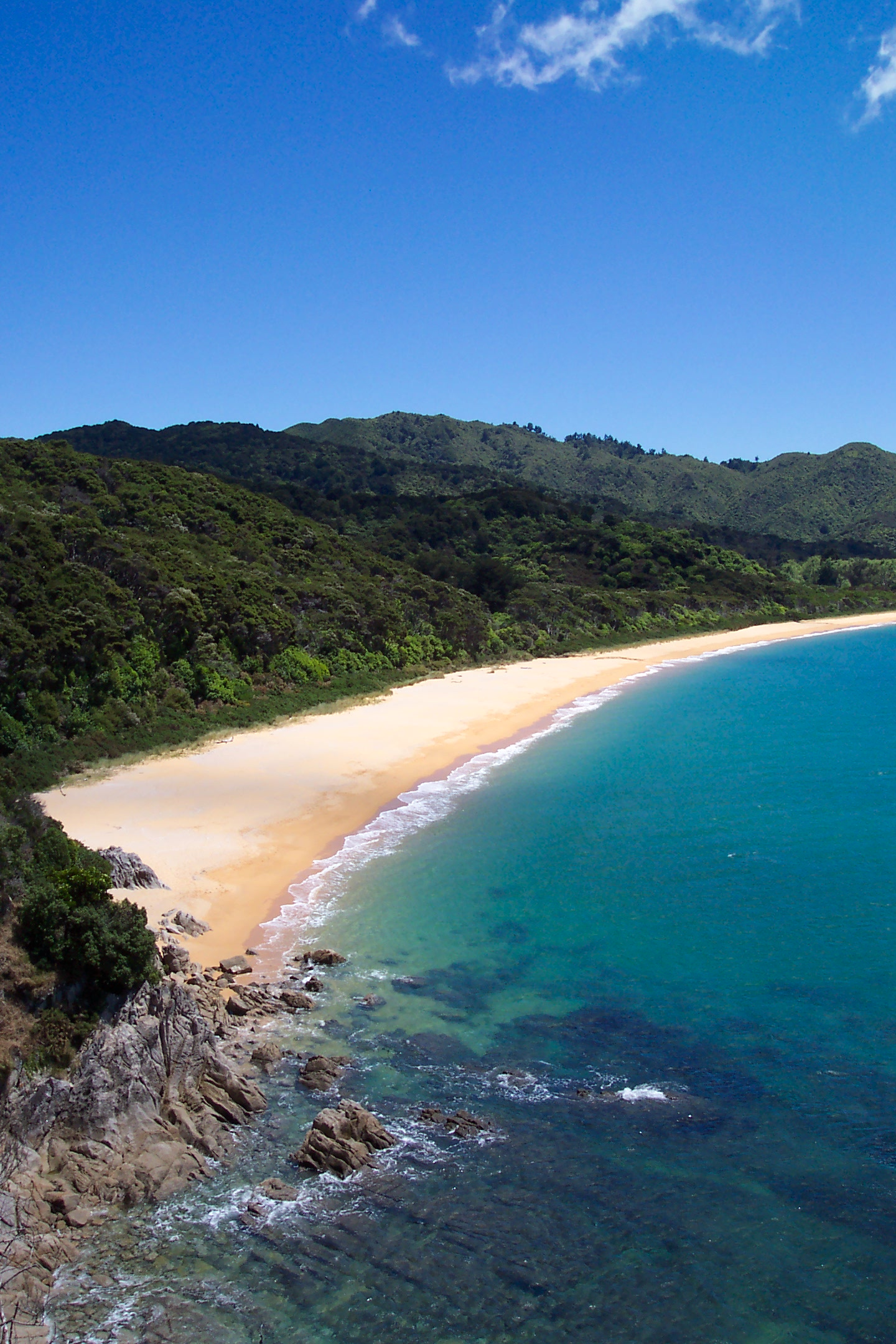
- Abel Tasman National Park is in the rohe (tribal areas) of Te Tau Ihu people.

Regions with significant populations
- Tasman District, Nelson City, Marlborough Region

Languages
- Māori language

Te Tau Ihu Māori are a group of Māori iwi in the upper South Island of New Zealand. It includes Ngāti Kuia, Rangitāne, Ngāti Tūmatakōkiri and Ngāti Apa ki te Rā Tō (from the Kurahaupō canoe), Ngāti Koata, Ngāti Rārua and Ngāti Toa (from the Tainui canoe), and Ngāti Tama and Te Atiawa o Te Waka-a-Māui (from the Tokomaru canoe of Taranaki).
