= New Zealand Listener Power List =

List of powerful people in New Zealand

The New Zealand Listener Power List is a list of the most powerful people in New Zealand, compiled annually by the New Zealand Listener from 2004 to 2009. From 2004 to 2007, the list covered the 50 most powerful people without separating them by field. In 2008, the list was divided into the top ten most powerful, and ten lists of five or six people each in specific fields.

== Power List ==
Name	2004	2005	2006	2007	2008	2009
John Key – Prime Minister 2008–, Leader of the Opposition 2006–2008	~	09	09	03	01	01
Bill English – Deputy Prime Minister 2008–, Deputy Leader of the Opposition 2006–2008	~	~	~	05	02	02
Dr Alan Bollard – Reserve Bank Governor	04	04	10	06	03	03
Rodney Hide – ACT New Zealand leader	~	~	~	~	07	04
Steven Joyce – National Party campaign chief	~	~	~	~	05	05
Rob Fyfe – Air New Zealand CEO	~	~	~	~	~	06
Michael Stiassny – Vector Energy chairman, receiver	~	~	~	~	~	07
Tariana Turia – Māori Party co-leader	18	20	~	~	~	08
John Whitehead – Secretary of the Treasury	35	24	~	~	~	09
Sir Peter Jackson – filmmaker	02	05	06	~	~	10
Phil Goff – Leader of the Opposition (2008–)	~	~	~	~	~	11
Sir Tumu Te Heuheu – Paramount chief of Tuwharetoa iwi	~	~	07	13	04	(Note: Moved to the Māoridom list)
Dr Pita Sharples – Māori Party co-leader	~	19	15	09	06	
Helen Clark – Prime Minister 1999–2008	01	01	01	01	08	~
Dr Michael Cullen – Deputy Prime Minister 2002–2008, Finance Minister 1999–2008	03	02	03	02	09	~
Gareth Morgan – economist	~	~	~	~	10	(Note: Moved to the Environment list)
Sam Morgan – founder of TradeMe	20	25	04	04	~	~
Graham Henry – All Black coach	13	14	23	07	~	~
Sir Henry van der Heyden – Chairman, Fonterra	45	~	~	08	(Note: Moved to the Primary sector list)	~
Sir Geoffrey Palmer – Law Commission President	~	~	~	10	(Note: Moved to the Government and law list)	~
John Barnett – television and film director	~	~	27	11	(Note: Moved to the Media list)	~
Lloyd Morrison – Managing Director, Infratil	~	49	20	12	~	~
Dr Keith Turner – Chief Executive, Meridian Energy	~	42	12	14	~	~
Peter Talley – businessman	~	~	33	15	~	
Richard Taylor – Weta Workshop head	~	~	~	16	(Note: Moved to the Culture list)	~
Paula Rebstock – Commerce Commission Chairman	~	~	14	17	~	~
Sue Bradford – politician	~	~	~	18	~	(Note: Moved to the Health, education and social issues list)
Professor Sir Paul Callaghan – Director of the MacDiarmid Institute	31	39	28	19	~	~
Dr Andy West – CEO of AgResearch	~	45	34	20		~
Jeanette Fitzsimons – politician	~	~	~	21		~
Sir Stephen Tindall – founder of The Warehouse	17	26	~	22	~	~
John Palmer – Air New Zealand chairman	~	~	~	23	~	(Note: Moved to the Business and economy list)
Heather Simpson – Prime Minister's Chief of Staff 1999–2008	33	21	24	24	~	~
Mark Weldon – New Zealand Exchange CEO	~	~	~	25		~
Willie Jackson – broadcaster	~	~	~	26	~	~
Craig Norgate – former leader of Fonterra, current leader of Wrightson	~	29	~	27		~
Allan Hubbard – Chair of South Canterbury Finance	~	41	18	28	~	
Graeme Hart – businessman, owner of the Rank Group	44	06	02	29		~
Phil O'Reilly – Business New Zealand leader	~	~	46	30	~	
Campbell Smith – Recording Industry Association of New Zealand chief executive	~	~	~	31		~
John Fellet – Sky Television Chief executive	~	11	05	32		~
Tony Carter – Foodstuffs managing directory	~	~	~	33	~	~
Ian Wishart – Investigate magazine editor	~	~	29	34	~	~
Mark Jennings – TV3 news director	~	~	~	35	~	~
Oscar Kightley – television and film directory and writer	~	~	36	36	~	~
Professor Bill Manhire – poet	~	~	~	37	~	~
Joe Karam – former All Black and David Bain campaigner	~	~	~	38	~	~
Jock Hobbs – New Zealand Rugby Union Chairman	~	~	22	39	~	~
Andrew Little – General Secretary, Engineering Manufacturing and Printing Union	38	30	~	40	~	~
Nick Hill – Sport and Recreation New Zealand Chief Executive	~	~	~	41	~	~
Jeremy Moon – founder of Icebreaker	~	~	~	42	~	~
Jenny Morel – venture capitalist	~	~	~	43	~	(Note: Moved to the Science and technology list)
Justice Joe Williams – Waitangi Tribunal Chair and Chief Judge of the Māori Land Court	~	~	~	44	~	~
David Skilling – New Zealand Institute thinktank founder	~	~	45	45	~	~
Paul Morgan – Federation of Māori Authorities chief executive	~	~	~	46	~	~
Professor Graeme Fraser – Chair, Health Research Council	~	48	48	47	~	~
Grant Dalton – America's Cup Team Boss	~	~	~	48	~	~
Shane Jones – Labour Party MP	09	23	~	49	~	~
Mai Chen – lawyer	~	~	~	50	~	~
Dr Don Brash – Leader of the Opposition 2003–2006	06	03	08	~	~	~
Andrew Ferrier – Fonterra CEO	~	~	11	~	~	~
Kevin Brady – Auditor-General	~	~	13	~	~	~
Trevor Mallard – Minister of Economic Development, Industry and Regional Development, and Sport	19	16	16	~	~	~
Tim Murphy – The New Zealand Herald editor	~	~	17	~	~	~
Sir Edmund Hillary – mountaineer	14	13	19	~	~	~
Dame Sian Elias – Chief Justice	28	28	21	~	~	~
Tiwana Tibble – Ngāti Whātua CEO	~	~	25	~	~	~
Sir John Anderson – TVNZ Chairman and New Zealand Cricket Chair	~	12	26	~	~	
Julie Christie – Managing Director, Eyeworks	~	~	30	~	~	~
John Shewan – PricewaterhouseCoopers New Zealand Chair	~	~	31	~	~	
Garth McVicar – Sensible Sentencing Trust founder	~	~	32	~	~	
Professor Stuart McCutcheon – University of Auckland Vice-Chancellor	~	34	35	~	~	~
Murray Deaker – radio host	~	37	37	~	~	
June Jackson – Manukau Urban Māori Authority head	~	~	38	~	~	~
Ian Athfield – architect	~	~	39	~	~	~
Kerry Prendergast – Mayor of Wellington	~	31	40	~	~	~
Trelise Cooper – fashion designer	36	~	41	~	~	~
Mark Solomon – Chair, Te Runanga O Ngāi Tahu	~	46	42	~	~	~
Sir John Wells – Sport and Recreation New Zealand Chairman	~	~	43	~	(Note: Moved to the Sport list)	~
Peter Boshier – Principal Family Court Judge	~	~	44	~	~	~
Kaye Parker – Cure Kids fundraiser	~	~	47	~	~	~
Ralph Hotere – artist	34	43	49	~	~	~
Murray Sherwin – Director-General of the Ministry of Agriculture and Forestry	~	38	50	~	~	~
Winston Peters – New Zealand First leader, Foreign Affairs Minister 2005–2008	16	07	~	~	~	~
Theresa Gattung – former Telecom New Zealand CEO	21	08	~	~	~	~
Brent Impey – Canwest Mediaworks CEO	24	10	~	~	~	~
Michael Campbell – golfer	~	15	~	~	~	~
Dr Roderick Deane – company director, Telecom, ANZ and Fletcher Building	07	17	~	~	~	~
John Campbell – television presenter	~	18	~	~	~	~
Tana Umaga – All Black captain	15	22	~	~	~	~
John Belgrave – Chief Ombudsman	50	27	~	~	~	~
Peter Dunne – United Future leader, Minister of Revenue	~	32	~	~	~	~
Dr Mark Prebble – State Services Commissioner	40	33	~	~	~	~
Brotha D – frontman for Dawn Raid	~	35	~	~	~	~
Rob McLeod – Business Roundtable chair	12	36	~	~	~	
Frances Stead – Managing Director, L'Oreal New Zealand	~	40	~	~	~	~
Sir Hugh Kawharu – Paramount Chief of the Ngati Whatua	~	44	~	~	~	~
Sir Eion Edgar – stockbroker	47	47	~	~	~	~
Steve Maharey – Minister of Education, Broadcasting, Science and Research	~	50	~	~	~	~
Ian Fraser – then CEO of Television New Zealand	05	~	~	~	~	~
Sir Ralph Norris – then CEO of Air New Zealand	08	~	~	~	~	~
John Tamihere – then Labour Party MP and former Cabinet Minister	10	~	~	~	~	~
Sir Tipene O'Regan – former leader of Ngāi Tahu	11	~	~	~	~	~
Sarah Ulmer – Olympic gold medal cyclist	22	~	~	~	~	~
Scribe – rap artist	23	~	~	~	~	~
Stephen Fleming – Black Caps cricket captain	25	~	~	~	~	~
Paul Holmes – broadcaster	26	~	~	~	~	~
Tahu Potiki – CEO of Te Runanga O Ngāi Tahu	27	~	~	~	~	~
David Butler – Commissioner of Inland Revenue Department	29	~	~	~	~	~
Dame Te Atairangi Kaahu – Maori Queen	30	~	~	~	~	~
Sylvia Rumball – Chair, National Ethics Committee on Assisted Human Reproduction	32	~	~	~	~	~
Mike Williams – President of the New Zealand Labour Party	37	~	~	~	~	~
David Skegg – Vice-Chancellor, University of Otago	39	~	~	~	~	~
Peter Leitch – The Mad Butcher	41	~	~	~	~	~
Dame Jenny Gibbs – art patron	42	~	~	~	~	~
Hugh Logan – Director-General of the Department of Conservation	43	~	~	~	~	~
Sir Kenneth Keith – Supreme Court Justice	46	~	~	~	~	~
Richard Woods – Director, New Zealand Security Intelligence Service	48	~	~	~	~	~
Marc Ellis – television personality	49	~	~	~	~	~

== Divisions ==
=== Business and economy ===
Name	2008	2009
Graeme Hart – businessman, owner of Rank Group	01	01
Sam Knowles – Chief Executive of Kiwibank	~	02
Phil O'Reilly – Business New Zealand CEO	~	03
John Palmer – Air New Zealand chairman	~	04
John Shewan – PricewaterhouseCoopers New Zealand Chair	~	05
Adrian Orr – CEO of New Zealand Superannuation Fund management company	02	~
Mark Weldon – New Zealand Exchange CEO	03	~
Craig Norgate – former leader of Fonterra, current leader of Wrightson	04	~
Jim Bolger – Prime Minister 1990–1997, Chairman of New Zealand Post, Kiwibank and KiwiRail	05	~

=== Māoridom ===
Name	2008	2009
Sir Tumu Te Heuheu – Paramount chief of Tuwharetoa iwi	~	01
Dr Pita Sharples – Māori Party co-leader	~	01
Rob McLeod – Business Roundtable chair	~	03
Hone Kaa – Te Kahui Mana Ririki chair and campaigner against child abuse	~	04
Katerina Mataira – Māori language revival pioneer	~	05
Paul Morgan – CEO of Federation of Maori Authorities	01	~
Jim Mather – CEO of Māori Television	02	
Wharehuia Milroy – linguist	03	~
Hinerangi Raumati – CFO of Tainui	04	~
Willie Jackson – radio and television broadcaster	05	~

=== Government and law ===
Name	2008	2009
Simon Power – Minister of Justice	~	01
Sir Geoffrey Palmer – Law Commission President	01	02
Judith Collins – Minister of Corrections and Minister of Police	~	03
Rob Cameron – investment banker	~	04
Garth McVicar – Sensible Sentencing Trust founder	~	05
David Collins – Solicitor-General	02	~
Annette Sykes – Te Arawa lawyer	03	~
Greg King – criminal lawyer	04	~
Greg O'Connor – President of the Police Association	05	~

=== Primary sector ===
Name	2008	2009
Chris Kelly – CEO of Landcorp	01	01
Sir Henry van der Heyden – Chairman, Fonterra	02	02
Peter Talley and Andrew Talley – businessmen	~	03
Allan Hubbard – Chair of South Canterbury Finance	~	04
Keith Cooper – Former Chief Executive of Silver Fern Farms	~	05
Andy West – CEO of AgResearch	03	~
Frank Brenmuhl – Vice-President of Federated Farmers	04	~
Dean Nikora – Hawke's Bay farmer	05	~

=== Health, education and social issues ===
Name	2008	2009
Tony Ryall – Minister of Health	~	01
Sue Bradford – activist	~	02
Sir John Anderson – TVNZ and Capital and Coast District Health Board Chairman	~	03
Rod Carr – University of Canterbury Vice-Chancellor	~	04
Nigel Latta – child psychologist	~	05
Ron Paterson – Health and Disability Commissioner	01	~
Stephen McKernan – Director-General of Health	02	~
Len Cook – Chairman of the Medical Training Board	03	~
Pat Sneddon – Chairman of the Quality Improvement Board and of the Auckland District Health Board	04	~
Deborah Powell – General Secretary, Resident Doctors' Association	05=	~
Ian Powell – Executive Director, Association of Salaried Medical Specialists	05=	~

=== Culture ===
Name	2008	2009
Richard Taylor – Weta Workshop head	03	01
Flight of the Conchords – television comedy duo	01	02
John Barnett – chief executive at South Pacific Pictures	~	03
Jane Wrightson – chief executive, New Zealand on Air	~	04
Campbell Smith – Recording Industry Association of New Zealand chief executive	04	05
Derek Lardelli – artist	02	~
Imogen Johnson – actors' agent	05	~

=== Science and technology ===
Name	2008	2009
Sir Peter Gluckman – Chief Science Advisor	03	01
Shaun Coffey – Industrial Research Limited chief executive	~	02
Rod Drury – entrepreneur	~	03
Stephen Goldson – Chief Scientist at AgResearch	04	04
Jenny Morel – venture capitalist	~	05
Jim Watson – Chair of the National Science Panel	01	~
Garth Carnaby – upcoming President of the Royal Society of New Zealand	02	~
Jim Anderton – Fast Forward fund promoter	05	~

=== Media ===
Name	2008	2009
John Fellet – CEO at Sky Television Chief executive	04	01
Jim Mather – CEO of Māori Television	~	02
John Armstrong – columnist at The New Zealand Herald	~	03
David Farrar – blogger	~	04
Murray Deaker – radio host	~	05
Tim Pankhurst – Editor, The Dominion Post	01	~
Jeff Latch – Head of Television at Television New Zealand	02	~
Bill Francis – General Manager at Newstalk ZB	03	~
John Barnett – chief executive at South Pacific Pictures	05	

=== Environment ===
Name	2008	2009
Nick Smith – Minister for the Environment	~	01
Gareth Morgan – economist and author	~	02
George Clement – fisheries consultant	~	03
Brent Clothier – Plant and Food Research scientist	~	04
Gary Taylor – executive director, Environmental Defence Society	~	05
David Parker – Minister responsible for the Emissions Trading Act	01	~
Jeanette Fitzsimons – co-leader of the Green Party	02	~
Russel Norman – co-leader of the Green Party	03	~
Jan Wright – Parliamentary Commissioner for the Environment	04	~
David Wratt – leader of the National Climate Centre at NIWA	05	~

=== Sport ===
Name	2008	2009
Martin Snedden – Rugby New Zealand CEO	~	01
Daniel Vettori – Black Caps captain	~	02
Ricki Herbert – All Whites coach	~	03
Valerie Vili – World shot put champion	04	04
Peter Dale – New Zealand Community Trust chairman	~	05
John Wells – Sport and Recreation New Zealand Chairman	01	~
Scott Dixon – Indianapolis 500 winner	02	~
Steve Price – Captain of the New Zealand Warriors	03	~
Alan Isaac – Chairman, New Zealand Cricket	05	~

== See also ==
- List of New Zealanders by net worth
