= Three Strikes Legislation Repeal Act 2022 =

Act of Parliament in New Zealand

New Zealand Parliament
- Royal assent: 15 August 2022
- Repealed: 13 December 2024

Legislative history
- Introduced by: Kris Faafoi
- First reading: 17 November 2021
- Second reading: 7 June 2022
- Third reading: 9 August 2022

Related legislation
- Sentencing and Parole Reform Act 2010
- Status: Expired

The Three Strikes Legislation Repeal Act 2022 was an omnibus Act of Parliament passed by the New Zealand Parliament that repealed the elements of the Sentencing and Parole Reform Act 2010, which constituted the so-called three-strikes law. The bill passed its third reading on 9 August 2022 with the support of the governing Labour Party, the allied Green Party, the Māori Party but was opposed by the opposition National and ACT parties. The following year the Sixth National Government took power and pledged to reinstate the three strikes law. On 13 December 2024, the Government passed legislation reinstating three-strikes legislation in New Zealand, effectively reversing the 2022 repeal legislation.

== Key provisions ==
The Three Strikes Legislation Repeal Act 2022 removes references to the Sentencing and Parole Reform Act 2010 in several laws including the Sentencing Act 2002, the Arms Act 1983, the Criminal Procedure Act 2011, the Evidence Act 2006, the Parole Act 2002, the Victims' Orders Against Violent Offenders Act 2014, Criminal Procedure (Transfer of Information) Regulations 2013, and the Legal Services (Quality Assurance) Regulations 2011.

Individuals sentenced for stage-2 or stage-3 offences prior to the passage of the Three Strikes Legislation Repeal Act are not eligible for release or resentencing. Those who have served or are currently serving sentences under the provisions of the Sentencing Parole Reform Act 2010 are also not entitled to compensation.

== History ==
=== Background ===
In May 2010, the Fifth National Government passed the Sentencing and Parole Reform Act 2010, which introduced a three-strikes law sentencing regime for repeat offenders. While it was supported by the centre-right National and libertarian ACT parties, the Sentencing and Parole Reform Act was opposed by the opposition Labour and Green parties as well as National's confidence and supply partner the Māori Party.

Since its passage, the Sentencing and Parole Reform Act was controversial in New Zealand society. While critics have criticized the law for its alleged punitive approach to justice and disproportionate impact on the Māori community, supporters such as the Sensible Sentencing Trust and Family First New Zealand claimed that it protected the public from the worst offenders.

Following the formation of the Sixth Labour Government after the 2017 general election, Justice Minister Andrew Little confirmed that his government would begin repealing the Sentencing and Parole Reform Act in early June 2018. He claimed that the law had failed to deter crime or lower the country's crime rate. In response, the Sensible Sentencing Trust's founder Garth McVicar commissioned a poll of 965 adults which claimed that 68 percent of New Zealanders approved of the law and 20 percent did not; including 63 percent of Labour supporters and 48 percent of Green supporters. On 11 June 2018, Andrew Little announced that the Government would be abandoning its efforts to repeal the "three-strikes law" due to opposition from its coalition partner, the populist conservative New Zealand First.

=== Introduction ===
In mid–November 2021, Justice Minister Kris Faafoi announced that the Labour-majority government would be introducing legislation to repeal the majority of the Sentencing and Parole Reform Act 2010. Faafoi described the "three-strikes law" as "archaic, unfair, and ineffective" and claimed it had led to "absurd and perverse" outcomes. While the proposed repeal legislation was supported by the Labour and Green parties, the opposition National and ACT parties defended the "three strikes law." National's justice spokesperson Simon Bridges and ACT's justice spokeswoman Nicole McKee claimed that repealing the "three strikes law" would "re-victimise" victims and encourage gangs and violent crime offenders.

=== First reading ===
On 17 November 2021, the Bill passed its first reading by 77 votes (Labour, Greens, and Māori parties) to 44 votes (National and ACT). The bill's sponsor Faafoi and Labour MP Ginny Andersen argued that the existing three strikes legislation restricted judicial discretion when it came to sentencing. Labour MP Emily Henderson and Green Party co-leader Marama Davidson supported repeal on the grounds that the Sentencing Parole and Reform Act 2010 impeded the rehabilitation of offenders while Labour MP Ingrid Leary claimed that Māori people were disproportionately affected by the three strikes legislation. By contrast, National MPs Bridges and Simon O'Connor, and ACT MP McKee accused the Government of going "soft on crime" and favouring criminals over victims.

=== Second reading ===
On 7 June 2022, the Bill passed its third reading by 77 votes to 42 votes along party lines.

=== Third reading ===
On 9 August 2022, the Labour Government's Three Strikes Legislation Repeal Bill passed its third reading in Parliament, becoming law. The bill was supported by the Labour, Green, and Māori parties but was opposed by National and ACT. Justice Minister Kiri Allan welcomed the repeal of the Sentencing and Parole Reform Act 2010, describing it as "anomaly in the New Zealand justice system" and a "knee-jerk reaction" to crime by the previous Fifth National Government. Similarly, Green MP Elizabeth Kerekere welcomed the repeal of the "three strikes" legislation, arguing that it was "punitive rather than restorative justice and rehabilitation." By contrast, the National and ACT parties' justice spokespersons Paul Goldsmith and McKee opposed the repeal, stating that the Government was ignoring rising crime rates and vowed to reinstate the Sentencing and Parole Reform Act if re-elected into Government at the next general election.

== Reversal ==
In late November 2023, the newly-formed Sixth National Government and its ACT and New Zealand First coalition partners vowed to reinstate three-strikes legislation. The three strikes legislation was introduced into Parliament on 25 June 2024. On 13 December 2024, the New Zealand Parliament passed legislation reinstating the three-strikes sentencing regime in New Zealand, effectively reversing the Three Strikes Legislation Repeal Act 2022. The law was supported by the National, ACT and New Zealand First parties but was opposed by the opposition Labour, Green parties and Te Pāti Māori.
