= David Garrett (politician) =

New Zealand lawyer and politician (born 1957)

Member of the New Zealand Parliament for ACT party list
- In office 8 November 2008 – 23 September 2010
- Succeeded by: Hilary Calvert (Note: Normally, list MPs do not have individual predecessors or successors, but Garrett resigned during a sitting parliament and therefore was succeeded by Calvert.)

Personal details
- Born: 1957 (age 68–69) Gisborne
- Party: ACT (until September 2010)
- Other political affiliations: Socialist Unity; Labour
- Profession: Lawyer

David Garrett (born 1957) is a lawyer and former member of the New Zealand House of Representatives. He entered parliament at the 2008 general election as a list MP for ACT New Zealand, having been ranked fifth on that party's list. He was ACT's spokesman on law and order until he resigned from the party on 17 September 2010. On 23 September 2010, he resigned from Parliament, following revelations that he had fraudulently obtained a passport in the name of a deceased infant in 1984.

== Early years ==
David Garrett was born in 1957 in Gisborne, where he grew up as one of six children. He went to school at Campion College, Gisborne, before working on oil rigs, initially in the North Sea but later elsewhere around the world for almost a decade. He attended Canterbury University between 1986 and 1992, where he completed a Bachelor of Arts and a law degree. In New Zealand Garrett became a member of the Socialist Unity Party and was a Labour Party activist. He also worked as a lawyer and a pro-bono legal adviser to the Sensible Sentencing Trust.

== Member of Parliament ==
New Zealand Parliament
| Years | Term | Electorate | List | Party |
|---|---|---|---|---|
| 2008–10 | 49th | List | 5 | ACT |
| 2010 | 49th | List | | Independent |

He joined the ACT party three months before the 2008 election, when he was approached to stand for ACT in an arrangement made between Rodney Hide, ACT leader, and Garth McVicar, chairman of the Sensible Sentencing Trust. He was elected as a list MP, having been ranked fifth on the ACT party list. He resigned from the ACT party on September 18, 2010, after the passport fraud incident came to light. He was formally confirmed as an independent MP at the beginning of the following week but then resigned from Parliament on September 23.

== Legislation ==
Garrett is the author of the "three strikes" legislation which was supported by the National Party and incorporated into the Sentencing and Parole Reform Act 2010 which became law in May 2010. Under this law, certain crimes involving violence or sexual offending are deemed "strike" offences. An offender receives a normal sentence and a warning for a first strike offence, a sentence without parole for a second, and the maximum sentence for the offence without parole for a third.

== Criminal offences ==
Garrett was convicted of assault in a Tongan Magistrates court in 2002. Notwithstanding that conviction, Garrett was made a Senior Counsel by the then Chief Justice of Tonga four years later, in 2006

In 2010, Garrett admitted in Parliament that he had used the identity of a deceased child to obtain a passport in 1984. He said he used a method shown in the novel The Day of the Jackal, and obtained the birth certificate of a child who died in infancy around the same time Garrett was born. The incident led to a court case being brought against Garrett in 2005; he was discharged without conviction, and the judge in the case ordered his name be suppressed from public record. During the case, Garrett swore a false affidavit to the court. He later pleaded guilty to doing so in front of the New Zealand Law Society's Lawyers and Conveyancer's Committee. This led to the committee formally censuring him, prohibiting him from practicing law for a period of one year, and ordering him to pay $8430 costs.

In 2011, Garrett pleaded guilty to one charge of drunk driving. He was fined $550 plus costs, and disqualified from driving for six months.

== After parliament ==
Garrett returned to Auckland and continues to practice law, in Tonga.
