= Mahara Okeroa =

New Zealand politician

The Honourable Mahara Okeroa
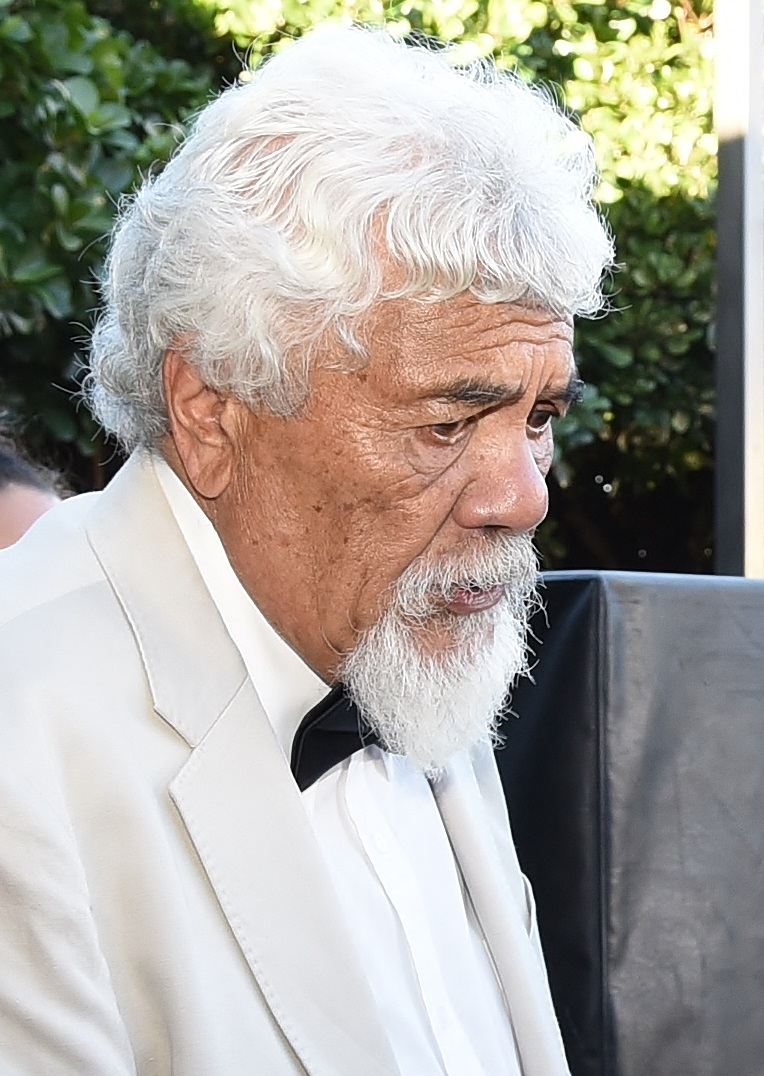
- Okeroa in 2018

Minister of State
- In office 19 October 2005 – 19 November 2008

Member of the New Zealand Parliament for Te Tai Tonga
- In office 27 November 1999 – 8 November 2008
- Preceded by: Tu Wyllie
- Succeeded by: Rahui Katene

Personal details
- Born: Te Whakamaharatanga Okeroa; 1946 (age 79–80) Waitara, New Zealand
- Party: Labour
- Children: Te Aorangi (son); Poata (son)
- Profession: Teacher, public servant, MP

Te Whakamaharatanga Okeroa (born 1946) is a former New Zealand politician of the New Zealand Labour Party. He represented the Te Tai Tonga Māori electorate as a Member of Parliament from 1999 to 2008.

== Early life and career ==
Okeroa was born in Waitara, Taranaki and grew up in Parihaka. He has iwi affiliations to Te Ātiawa, Ngāti Maniapoto, Taranaki, Ngāti Ruanui and Ngā Rauru. He trained and worked as a teacher before joining the Ministry of Education as a Māori education advisor and Te Puni Kōkiri as director for the Taranaki region.

== Member of Parliament ==
New Zealand Parliament
| Years | Term | Electorate | List | Party |
|---|---|---|---|---|
| 1999–2002 | 46th | Te Tai Tonga | none | Labour |
| 2002–2005 | 47th | Te Tai Tonga | 33 | Labour |
| 2005–2008 | 48th | Te Tai Tonga | 22 | Labour |

Okeroa sought the Labour Party candidacy in Te Tai Hauāuru in 1998 (for the 1999 general election), but lost to Labour list MP Nanaia Mahuta. He was instead selected for Te Tai Tonga, the Māori electorate covering the South Island and Wellington city. He was successful, defeating the incumbent Tu Wyllie of the New Zealand First Party. Okeroa held the electorate in 2002 and 2005.

In his first term as an MP, Okeroa was deputy chair of the Social Services select committee and a member of the Māori Affairs committee. In his second term, he was chair of the Māori Affairs committee and a member of the law and order committee. From July 2004, he held additional appointments as parliamentary under-secretary to the Minister of Māori Affairs and to the Minister of Education.

After the 2005 general election, Okeroa was appointed a minister outside of Cabinet holding associate ministerial portfolios for Arts, Culture and Heritage; Conservation and Social Development and Employment.

In the 2008 general election, Rahui Katene of the Māori Party out-polled Okeroa by a margin of 1,049 votes. Okeroa's party list placement of 40 meant he was not able to immediately be elected as a list MP. He declined to re-enter Parliament as a list MP after the resignation of Darren Hughes in 2011 and did not stand for the general election later that year. He was succeeded as Labour's Te Tai Tonga candidate by Rino Tirikatene.

== Post-parliamentary career ==
Okeroa was elected to the Port Nicholson Block Settlement Trust in 2009 and succeeded Sir Ngātata Love as chair in October 2012 after the latter was removed, following a Serious Fraud Office investigation. Okeroa held the chair until October 2013 when he was replaced by Neville Baker. Okeroa's resignation from the Trust was announced the following year.

He has also been a trustee of the Wellington Tenths Trust.

New Zealand Parliament
| Preceded by Tu Wyllie | Member of Parliament for Te Tai Tonga; 1999–2008 | Succeeded by Rahui Katene |
