= Bailey Junior Kurariki =

New Zealand murderer (born 1989)

Charges in the killing of Michael Choy
Person	Age (years)	Charge
Bailey Junior Kurariki	12	manslaughter
Alexander Tokorua Peihopa	16	murder
Ricky Rapira	16	manslaughter and aggravated robbery
Joe Edwin Kaukasi	15	manslaughter and aggravated robbery
Whatarangi Rawiri	17	murder and aggravated robbery
Phillip Kaukasi	17	attempted aggravated robbery
Casie Rawiri	21	theft and attempted aggravated robbery
name suppressed	16	attempted aggravated robbery (acquitted)

In 2001, Bailey Junior Kurariki (born 15 May 1989) was involved in the robbery, assault and murder of pizza delivery man Michael Richard Choy (15 February 1961 – 13 September 2001) in Papakura, a suburb of Auckland, New Zealand. Kurariki was later convicted of manslaughter. He was 12 years and 252 days old the day Choy was killed, making him the youngest person convicted of killing in New Zealand history.

On 12 September 2001, a group of teenagers attacked pizza delivery man Michael Choy with a baseball bat and robbed him of cash and the pizzas he was delivering. The attack was planned by Whatarangi Rawiri and carried out on her 17th birthday, and Alexander Tokorua Peihopa led the group in attacking Choy with a baseball bat. The pair were later convicted for murder, and given life sentences.

At the time of Choy's death, Kurariki was in the custody of Child, Youth and Family instead of his mother's, but had absconded; he had been in trouble since the age of five and had not been to school for more than a year.

In the days following the death of Choy, Kurariki was interviewed by police and reportedly confessed to the killing. However, police did not follow the correct procedures in conducting an interview with an alleged offender under 17, making the results of the interview inadmissible.

Choy's stepfather, Ken Croskery, became active in the Sensible Sentencing Trust, a lobby group campaigning for longer sentences. After his death, 10 years later, his family claims that he died of a broken heart.

Kurariki was reportedly "born again" while in prison, and was released on parole on 5 May 2008, but has been in trouble with the court since and has connections to the Killer Beez gang. There has also been contention about the nature of evidence needed to recall him to jail for breaching parole.

On 29 March 2011 Kurariki was convicted for assault and domestic violence charges and sentenced to 14 months in prison. During one hearing, he declared himself to be "just an innocent black man".
