= Rahui Katene =

New Zealand politician

Member of the New Zealand Parliament for Te Tai Tonga
- In office 8 November 2008 – 26 November 2011
- Preceded by: Mahara Okeroa
- Succeeded by: Rino Tirikatene
- Majority: 1,049 (45.73%)

Personal details
- Born: Rahui Reid Hippolite; 1954 (age 71–72) Nelson, New Zealand
- Party: Māori Party
- Spouse: Dr Selwyn Katene
- Children: 5

Rahui Reid Katene (née Hippolite, born 1954) is a New Zealand politician. She was elected to the 49th New Zealand Parliament at the 2008 general election representing the Māori Party in the seat of Te Tai Tonga, but lost in the 2011 general election to Labour's Rino Tirikatene.

== Early life and family ==
The daughter of activist John Hippolite, Katene is of Ngati Koata, Ngati Kuia, Ngāti Toa and Kāi Tahu descent. She grew up in Nelson and was educated at Waimea College and Church College of New Zealand. A lawyer, she spent six years as managing solicitor at Te Ratonga Ture / Māori Legal Services. Katene is a member of the Church of Jesus Christ of Latter-day Saints.

== Member of Parliament ==
New Zealand Parliament
Years	Term	Electorate	List	Party
2008–2011	49th	Te Tai Tonga	7	Māori Party

Prior to the 2008 general election, Katene initially missed out on the Māori Party candidacy for Te Tai Tonga to Monte Ohia. However she became the candidate following Ohia's death.

She defeated incumbent Labour MP Mahara Okeroa with an election night majority of 684.

In 2009 her Te Rā o Matariki Bill/Matariki Day Bill, which would have made Matariki a public holiday, was drawn from the member's ballot. The bill was defeated at its first reading.

In 2010, her member's bill to remove Goods and Services Tax from healthy food was drawn from the member's ballot. The bill gathered support although Labour leader Phil Goff favoured a simpler exemption on just fruit and vegetables. It was defeated at its first reading: National, ACT and United Future voted against the bill while Labour, the Greens, the Māori Party and the Progressive Party supported it.

Since leaving Parliament Katene has remained active in the Māori Party and was briefly in the media spotlight for failing to remove her designation as an MP from social media, a revelation discovered after she appeared in new articles criticising her replacement, Rino Tirikatene who she argued was not listening to the electorate. In early 2013 Katene put her hat in the ring to replace retiring co-leader Tariana Turia who had announced she would step down before the 2014 General election. However, Marama Fox was subsequently chosen as Turia's replacement following the general election.

Katene has also been working for the New Zealand Māori Council as a spokeswomen, supporting its legal challenge to the sale into mixed ownership of Crown-owned assets.

New Zealand Parliament
Preceded by Mahara Okeroa	Member of Parliament for Te Tai Tonga; 2008–2011	Succeeded by Rino Tirikatene
