= Minister for Courts =

New Zealand minister of the Crown

Minister of Courts of New Zealand
- Coat of arms of New Zealand

- Flag of New Zealand

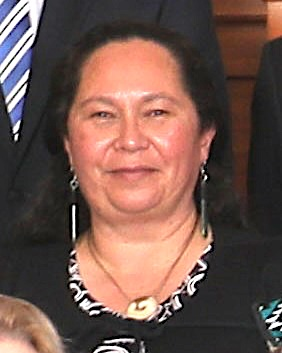
- Incumbent; Nicole McKee since 27 November 2023
- Ministry of Justice
- Style: The Honourable
- Member of: Cabinet of New Zealand; Executive Council
- Reports to: Prime Minister of New Zealand
- Appointer: Governor-General of New Zealand
- Term length: At His Majesty's pleasure
- Formation: 1 July 1995
- First holder: Doug Graham
- Salary: $288,900
- Website: www.beehive.govt.nz

The Minister for Courts (or Minister of Courts) is a minister in the New Zealand Government with responsibility for the support and administration of the courts system. It was split from the Justice portfolio in 1995.

== List of ministers ==
Key

Labour National Alliance ACT

No.	Name	Portrait	Term of office		Prime Minister
1	Doug Graham		1 July 1995	8 December 1997	Bolger
2	Wyatt Creech		8 December 1997	31 August 1998	Shipley
3	Georgina te Heuheu		31 August 1998	10 December 1999	Shipley
4	Matt Robson		10 December 1999	15 August 2002	Clark
5	Margaret Wilson		15 August 2002	19 May 2003	Clark
6	Rick Barker		19 May 2003	19 November 2008	Clark
(3)	Georgina te Heuheu		19 November 2008	14 December 2011	Key
7	Chester Borrows		14 December 2011	8 October 2014	Key
8	Amy Adams		8 October 2014	26 October 2017	Key
8	Amy Adams		8 October 2014	26 October 2017	English
9	Andrew Little		26 October 2017	6 November 2020	Ardern
10	William Sio		6 November 2020	1 February 2023	Ardern
10	William Sio		6 November 2020	1 February 2023	Hipkins
11	Rino Tirikatene		1 February 2023	27 November 2023	Hipkins
12	Nicole McKee		27 November 2023	present	Luxon
