= Sentencing and Parole Reform Act 2010 =

New Zealand Parliament
- Passed: 25 March 2010
- Royal assent: 31 May 2010
- Commenced: 1 June 2010
- Repealed: 16 August 2022
- Introduced by: Judith Collins

Repealed by
- Three Strikes Legislation Repeal Act 2022
- Status: Repealed

The Sentencing and Parole Reform Act 2010 was an Act of Parliament in New Zealand that denied parole to repeat violent offenders, and imposed maximum terms of imprisonment on repeat offenders who commit three serious violent offences - unless it would be manifestly unjust. The law was known informally in New Zealand public, media and government circles as the "three-strikes law".

The bill passed its third reading on 25 May 2010. It was supported by the conservative National and libertarian ACT parties but was opposed by the Labour, Green, and Māori parties. It became law when it received royal assent on 31 May 2010.

It led to some anomalous sentencing outcomes with questionable evidence that it helped to reduce violent offending. It was repealed on 9 August 2022, by the Sixth Labour Government. On 13 December 2024, the Sixth National Government passed legislation reinstating a three-strikes sentencing regime in New Zealand.

== Purpose ==
The Sensible Sentencing Trust, led by Garth McVicar, played a significant role in promoting the idea of a "three strikes and you're out" sentencing law in New Zealand from as early as 2004. The Ministry of Justice says the law was "intended to deter repeat offenders with the threat of progressively longer mandatory prison terms, and to penalise those who continued to re-offend through a three-stage process."

== Key provisions ==
The Sentencing and Parole Reform Act 2010 created a three-stage system of increasing consequences for repeat violent offenders. The Act applied to 40 qualifying offences comprising all violent and sexual offences with a maximum penalty of seven years or greater imprisonment. It covered murder, attempted murder, manslaughter, wounding with intent to cause grievous bodily harm, sexual violation, abduction, kidnapping, and aggravated robbery. Since the New Zealand Bill of Rights Act 1990 prohibits retroactive application of laws to disadvantage an offender, the law only applies to offences committed on or after 1 June 2010.

A first warning is issued after an offender who is aged 18 or over is convicted of a qualifying offence. Once the offender has received a "first-strike" warning, it stays on their criminal record permanently unless their conviction is overturned. The warning must be given verbally by the Judge and followed up in writing for it to be valid. If the offender is subsequently convicted of another qualifying offence, they receive a final warning. If they are sentenced to a term of imprisonment, they will serve that sentence in full without the possibility of parole. The first and final warnings will stay on the offender's record.

On conviction of a third qualifying offence, the court must impose the maximum penalty for the offence on the defendant. The legislation stipulates that if the offence the court must also order that the sentence be served without parole, unless the qualifying offence is manslaughter or court considers that it would be manifestly unjust. In cases of manslaughter, a minimum non-parole period of 20 years applies instead, unless the court considers that it would be manifestly unjust, in which case the standard 10-year non-period for life imprisonment applies.

If the second or third qualifying offence is murder, then the court must impose a sentence of life imprisonment without possibility of parole, unless it deems it manifestly unjust to do so.

In the case a previous qualifying offence is overturned, the courts must set aside all other qualifying offences' sentences and warnings, and re-sentence and re-warn as if the overturned offence never occurred. Sentencing judges for second and third qualifying offences must state in their sentencing judgment the sentence they would have given but for the Act to assist in case of re-sentencing.

The Act also introduced the option to impose life imprisonment without possibility of parole for murder regardless of the offender's previous convictions. If an offender aged 18 and over is convicted of murder, and the sentencing judge believes no minimum parole period would satisfy the purposes and principles of sentencing, they may impose a sentence of life imprisonment without parole. As of 2022, Brenton Tarrant, perpetrator of the Christchurch mosque shootings, is the only person sentenced to life imprisonment without parole under this provision. The provision for life without parole was not repealed with the Three Strikes Legislation Repeal Act 2022.

== History ==
=== Legislative passage ===
The Sentencing and Parole Reform Act was first introduced into the New Zealand House of Representatives on 18 February 2009. The Bill passed its first reading by a margin of 64 to 58 votes. While it was supported by the ruling National Party and its ACT and United Future coalition partners, it was opposed by the opposition Labour, Green, and Jim Anderton's Progressive Party as well as the Fifth National Government's support partner the Māori Party. The Bill's supporters argued that a three strikes law was needed due to insufficient sentencing and parole laws while opponents argued that the Bill would not reduce crime but contribute to higher incarceration and recidivism rates.

The Sentencing and Parole Reform Bill was referred to the Law and Order select committee on 18 February 2009. The committee received a total of 1,075 submissions on the Sentencing and Parole Reform Bill; with 32 opposing the Bill, 729 supporting it, and 308 supporting it in principle. Between May and June 2009, the committee also heard 57 submissions in Auckland and Wellington. The Law and Order select committee reported back to the House on 26 March 2010, recommending the Bill to proceed with modifications. The largest modification was changing the third strike penalty from life imprisonment with 25 years non-parole to the maximum sentence without parole, after the Attorney-General Christopher Finlayson found the original penalty breached the cruel and unusual punishment provisions in the New Zealand Bill of Rights Act 1990.

The Sentencing and Parole Reform Bill passed its second reading on 4 May 2010 by a margin of 63 to 59. A majority of the New Zealand House of Representatives voted to accept the amendments recommended by the Law and Order select committee and to pass the Bill through its second reading. While National and ACT supported the Bill, it was opposed by the Labour, Green, Māori, Progressive, and United Future parties. The Bill's supporters including its sponsor Minister of Corrections Judith Collins, fellow National MP Melissa Lee and ACT leader Rodney Hide argued that a three-stage sentencing regime would increasing public safety while providing a warning to offenders to amend their ways. Opponents of the Bill including Labour MPs Lianne Dalziel, Parekura Horomia, Chris Hipkins, Green MP David Clendon, and Māori Party MP Hone Harawira argued that it was punitive, would boost incarceration rates, and discouraged the rehabilitation of prisoners.

On 25 May 2010, the Sentencing and Parole Reform Bill passed its third and final reading by a margin of 63 to 58 votes. While National and ACT supported the Bill, it was opposed by the Labour, Green, Māori, Progressive, and United Future parties. During the final reading, Collins reiterated the Government's commitment to law and order and public security while reiterating that the three strikes sentencing regime would not apply to offenses committed by juveniles under the age of 18 years but would only apply to 40 specific serious offences. The Bill received royal assent and became law on 31 May 2010.

=== Effectiveness ===
Since its passage, the so-called "three-strikes law" has been controversial in New Zealand society. Critics have criticised the Sentencing and Parole Reform Act for its alleged punitive approach to justice and for disproportionately affecting the Māori community. By contrast, it has been supported by conservative advocacy groups such as the Sensible Sentencing Trust and Family First New Zealand.

According to the Ministry of Justice, there is little evidence that three strikes legislation reduced serious offending; it restricted the judiciary's ability to consider the individual circumstances and context of the offending; it impacted more adversely on Maori who are already overrepresented in the prison system and in subsequent cases, the High Court, Court of Appeal, and Supreme Court found sentences imposed under the regime contravened the Bill of Rights Act. Despite its ineffectiveness, the National Party said it will reinstate the legislation when it becomes the Government. Referring to the anomalous sentencing of Wiremu Allen described below, National's Justice spokesperson, Paul Goldsmith, said: “It is unimaginable that offenders such as Wiremu Allen, who was convicted of a third strike offence which entailed breaking into a house, demanding money from the victim and then shooting him, would not receive the maximum mandatory sentence today.

=== Anomalous results ===
In December 2016, a mentally ill man, Daniel Fitzgerald, was sentenced to seven years in prison after he approached a woman he didn't know and kissed her on the cheek in the street in Wellington. He already had two strikes for similar offending in 2012 and 2015. Under the three strikes law, the judge had to impose the maximum prison sentence of seven years for the kiss, designated as indecent assault. Fitzgerald served four years. In 2021, the Supreme Court ruled that the sentence of seven years under the three strikes law was so grossly disproportionate that it breached his human rights. Without the three strikes law, the sentence would have been six months. Fitzgerald was awarded $450,000 in compensation by the government for the four years he spent in prison.

In July 2020, Wiremu Allen incurred his “third strike” after he was involved in an accidental shooting in the Hutt Valley. Allen is a member of the King Cobra gang. He and a younger man had forced their way into a Stokes Valley flat in the early hours of June 15, 2019, trying to collect a debt. Both men had pistols and the victim was shot in the knee when the younger man's pistol discharged, which the Crown accepted was accidental. Although he didn't shoot the victim, Allen pleaded guilty to wounding with reckless disregard. Because it was his third strike, the judge had to sentence him to seven years’ in prison, the maximum for this crime. At sentencing, Justice Karen Clark said Allen would have received only two years and one month in prison if not subject to the third strikes regime. His lawyer, Chris Nicholls, said that without the punitive three strikes restrictions, after the time he had already spent in custody on remand, Allen would have been released in four weeks and sent to an intensive treatment and rehabilitation programme.

=== Repeal efforts ===
Following the formation of the Labour coalition government after the 2017 general election, Labour's Justice Minister Andrew Little announced that it would be scrapping the three-strikes law. Little argued that the law was doing little to facilitate rehabilitation of violent offenders and was contributing to New Zealand's growing prison population. Little's announcement was criticised by ACT Party leader David Seymour.

On 30 May 2018, Justice Minister Little announced that the Labour coalition government would be taking steps to repeal the "three-strikes law" in early June. In response, the Sensible Sentencing Trust's founder Garth McVicar commissioned a poll of 965 adults which claimed that 68 percent of New Zealanders approved of the law and 20 percent did not; including 63 percent of Labour supporters and 48 percent of Green supporters. On 11 June 2018, Andrew Little announced that the Government would be abandoning its efforts to repeal the "three-strikes law" due to opposition from its coalition partner, the populist conservative New Zealand First.

In mid–November 2021, Justice Minister Kris Faafoi announced that the Labour-majority government would be introducing the Three Strikes Legislation Repeal Bill to repeal the majority of Sentencing and Parole Reform Act. Faafoi described the "three-strikes law" as "archaic, unfair, and ineffective" and claimed it had led to "absurd and perverse" outcomes. While the proposed repeal legislation was supported by the Labour and Green parties, the opposition National and ACT parties defended the "three strikes law." National's justice spokesperson Simon Bridges and ACT's justice spokeswoman Nicole McKee claimed that repealing the "three strikes law" would "re-victimise" victims and encourage gangs and violent crime offenders.

On 9 August 2022, the Labour Government's Three Strikes Legislation Repeal Bill passed its third reading in Parliament, becoming law. The bill was supported by the Labour, Green, and Māori parties but was opposed by National and ACT. Justice Minister Kiri Allan welcomed the repeal of the Sentencing and Parole Reform Act 2010, describing it as "anomaly in the New Zealand justice system" and a "knee-jerk reaction" to crime by the previous Fifth National Government. Similarly, Green MP Elizabeth Kerekere welcomed the repeal of the "three strikes" legislation, arguing that it was "punitive rather than restorative justice and rehabilitation." By contrast, the National and ACT parties' justice spokespersons Paul Goldsmith and Nicole McKee opposed the repeal, stating that the Government was ignoring rising crime rates and vowed to reinstate the Sentencing and Parole Reform Act if re-elected into Government at the next general election.

=== Reinstatement ===
On 24 November 2023, the newly-formed Sixth National Government and its ACT and New Zealand First coalition partners vowed to reinstate three-strikes legislation. The three strikes reinstatement legislation was introduced into Parliament on 25 June 2024. On 13 December 2024, the New Zealand Parliament passed legislation reinstating the country's three-strikes sentencing regime. The law was supported by the National, ACT and New Zealand First parties but was opposed by the opposition Labour, Green parties and Te Pāti Māori.

== Statistics ==
Year	First warning	Final warning	Third strike
2010	160	–	–
2011	911	1	–
2012	1,310	12	–
2013	1,333	16	–
2014	1,275	32	–
2015	1,291	52	–
2016	1,424	56	1
2017	1,506	83	1
2018	1,519	101	5
2019	1,299	108	6
2020	1,184	100	7

== Polling ==
A 2018 Poll found that 68% supported the Three Strikes law. It also found that with party supporters, National supporters support the law with 78%, New Zealand First supporters at 66%, Labour party supporters at 63%, Green party supporters at 48%
