= Nicole McKee =

New Zealand politician (born 1971/72)

The Honourable Nicole McKee MP
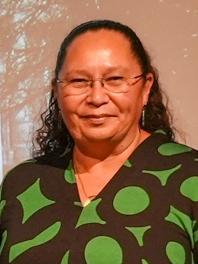
- McKee in 2025

Deputy Leader of ACT New Zealand
- Incumbent
- Assumed office 28 June 2026
- Leader: David Seymour
- Preceded by: Brooke van Velden

12th Minister for Courts
- Incumbent
- Assumed office 27 November 2023
- Prime Minister: Christopher Luxon
- Preceded by: Rino Tirikatene

Member of the New Zealand Parliament for ACT party list
- Incumbent
- Assumed office 17 October 2020

Personal details
- Born: 1971 or 1972 (age 54–55)
- Party: ACT
- Spouse: Duncan McKee
- Children: 4

Nicole Raima McKee (born 1971 or 1972) is a New Zealand politician. She has been a Member of Parliament for ACT New Zealand since the 2020 general election, and Deputy Leader since June 2026. She currently serves as the 12th Minister for Courts and Associate Minister of Justice (Firearms).

== Early life and career ==
McKee was born in Lower Hutt. She moved to Rotorua in her teens, then returned to Wellington as an adult. McKee became pregnant when she was 24. Her partner died in a car crash a week before their daughter was born.

== Political career ==
New Zealand Parliament
Years	Term	Electorate	List	Party
2020–2023	53rd	List	3	ACT
2023–2026	54th	List	3	ACT
2026–present	55th	List	2	ACT

Mckee entered public life as a lobbyist for the Council of Licensed Firearms Owners, appearing in the media to criticise the Sixth Labour Government's gun law reforms, passed following the Christchurch mosque shootings of 15 March 2019. The new restrictions on gun ownership and game animal management are the issues which propelled her to enter politics. She met David Seymour, ACT's leader, through their opposition to those gun laws, and joined the ACT Party in June 2020.

=== First term, 2020–2023 ===
McKee ran for the electorate of Rongotai at the 2020 general election and was also ranked third on the ACT Party list. While she did not win the electorate, McKee was elected through the party list since ACT won 7.6% of the vote, entitling it to ten seats in Parliament. In her first term, she was ACT's spokesperson for firearms law reform, conservation, justice and veterans.

=== Second term, 2023-2026 ===
McKee contested Rongotai unsuccessfully for a second time at the 2023 general election, coming fourth place. She was re-elected to Parliament for a second term as a list MP.

Following the formation of the National-led coalition government, McKee became Minister for Courts and Associate Minister of Justice (Firearms) in late November 2023.

==== Three strikes legislation ====
In April 2024, Associate Justice Minister McKee and Prime Minister Christopher Luxon confirmed that the Government would proceed with plans to reintroduce three strikes legislation, which had been repealed by the previous Labour Government. The new three strikes framework would only apply to sentences lasting at least two years, give judges greater discretion in cases where harsh outcomes would be "manifestly unjust," encourage offenders on their final strike to plead guilty, add strangulation and suffocation to crimes qualifying for three strikes sentences and demand a lengthy non-parole period for repeat murderers.

On 25 June 2024, McKee announced that the Government would introduce the Sentencing (Reinstating Three Strikes) Amendment Bill to reinstate the three-strikes legislation that was repealed by the previous Labour government. The Bill passed into law on 10 December 2024.

==== Firearms ====
On 14 June 2024, McKee confirmed that the Government would introduce new firearms legislation by 2026 to replace the Arms Act 1983. Proposed changes include reviewing the firearms registry and transferring the Firearms Safety Authority from the Police to another government department.

In late June 2024, McKee also defended the Government's plan to amend Part 6 of the Arms Legislation Act 2020, which requires oversight and regulation of shooting clubs and ranges. The New Zealand Police Association, Federation of Islamic Associations of New Zealand, Gun Control New Zealand, and the opposition Labour Party had criticised the Government for the short timeframe for public submissions and giving priority to select groups. In response, McKee defended the short consultation timeframe and argued that the law needed to be change to help club ranges and owners "struggling with burdensome and confusing regulation."

On 12 August 2024, NZ Police Association's president Chris Cahill called for McKee to be removed from the firearms reform portfolio due to the union's exclusion from the consultation process for the amendment to the Arms Legislation Act. Cahill also accused McKee of being a gun lobbyist. In response to Cahill's criticism, McKee defended the consultation process and said that Police had been consulted.

On 11 November 2025, McKee unveiled the Government's proposed Arms Act replacement legislation. Under the proposed legislation, the Government would transfer gun licensing responsibilities from the New Zealand Police's Firearms Safety Authority to a new independent agency. However, the Government would retain its ban on semi-automatic firearms and the national gun registry. McKee also confirmed that the Government would create a new Firearms Licensing Review Committee and introduce eight new offenses including manufacturing firearms without a license. This bill passed into law in late July 2026.

==== Justice ====
On 11 July 2024, McKee and Justice Minister Paul Goldsmith announced the formation of a new retail crime advisory group to engage with victims, workers, business owners, retail experts and advocacy groups to combat retail crime. The advisory group will be allocated NZ$1.8 million a year and expected to last two years. On 10 February 2026, Radio New Zealand reported that the retail crime advisory group would be dissolved in May 2026, four months ahead of its planned dissolution in September 2026. Three of the group's five members had resigned due to disagreements with the group's chairman Sunny Kaushal.

On 1 July 2025, McKee and Goldsmith announced several proposed tougher penalties to combat shoplifting. These included introducing infringement fees for shoplifting offences above NZ$500 and NZ$100, increasing prison terms to one year for stolen goods worth NZ$2,000 and seven years for goods worth NZ $2,000 or more, and creating a new aggravated shoplifting offence. These changes were part of National's coalition agreement with NZ First. On 3 July, Goldsmith and McKee announced that the Government would increase the maximum trespass period from two to three years, and raise the maximum fines for trespassing.

On 28 August 2025, McKee announced that the Government would amend alcohol legislation to make it harder for people to block liquor licenses and to introduce one-off special trading hours for pubs and clubs hosting major sport and cultural events. Other proposed changes include making it harder for liquor licensing bodies to reject alcohol license applications, allowing hairdressers and barbers to serve small amounts of alcohol without a license and banning food delivery services like UberEats from serving highly intoxicated customers.

==== Deputy leadership ====
On 28 June 2026, McKee was appointed as ACT's deputy leader during the party's annual general meeting in Auckland, succeeding the outgoing Brooke van Velden. She emphasised her role in rewriting the Arms Act and the passage of the reinstatement of the three-strikes law. During her acceptance speech, McKee said she was proud of both her British and Māori ancestry, and criticised Te Pāti Māori's claim to represent all Māori.

=== Third term, 2026–present ===
During the 2026 New Zealand general election, McKee was ranked second on the ACT party list and contested the Wellington Bays electorate. Based on preliminary results, McKee came fifth place in Wellington Bays with 1,450 votes. She was re-elected to Parliament on the ACT party list.

== Personal life ==
McKee lives in Hataitai, Wellington. She is married, and she and her husband Duncan have four children. She enjoys hunting and wool spinning. McKee is Māori and her iwi is Ngāpuhi.
