= Te Tai Tonga =

Coordinates: 43.6000°S 172.0000°E

- Single-member Māori constituency for the New Zealand House of Representatives

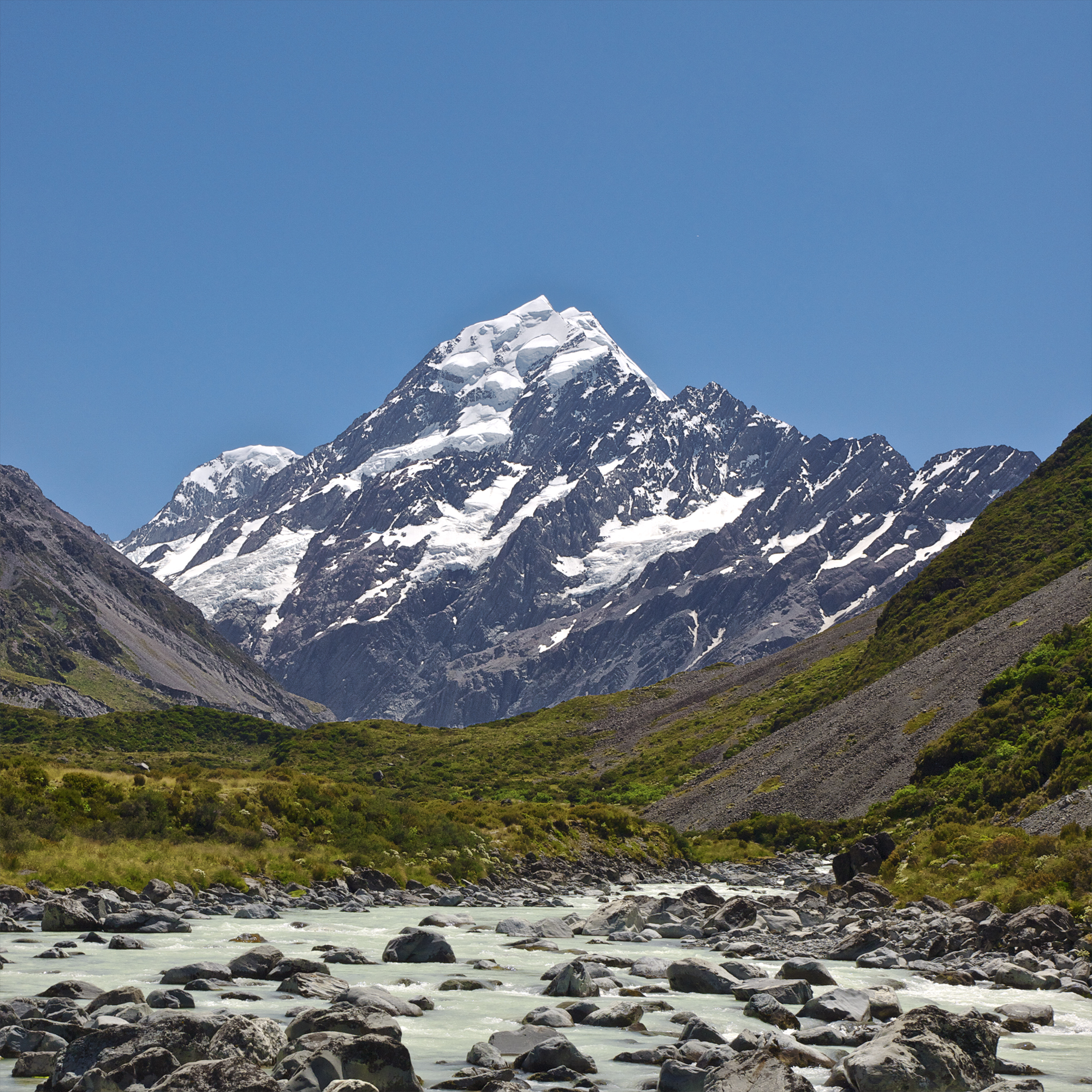
- Aoraki / Mount Cook, New Zealand's tallest mountain and of deep cultural importance to iwi in the South Island
- Formation: 1996
- Region: All South Island regions; Wellington; Chatham Islands
- Character: Urban and rural
- Term: 3 years

Member for Te Tai Tonga
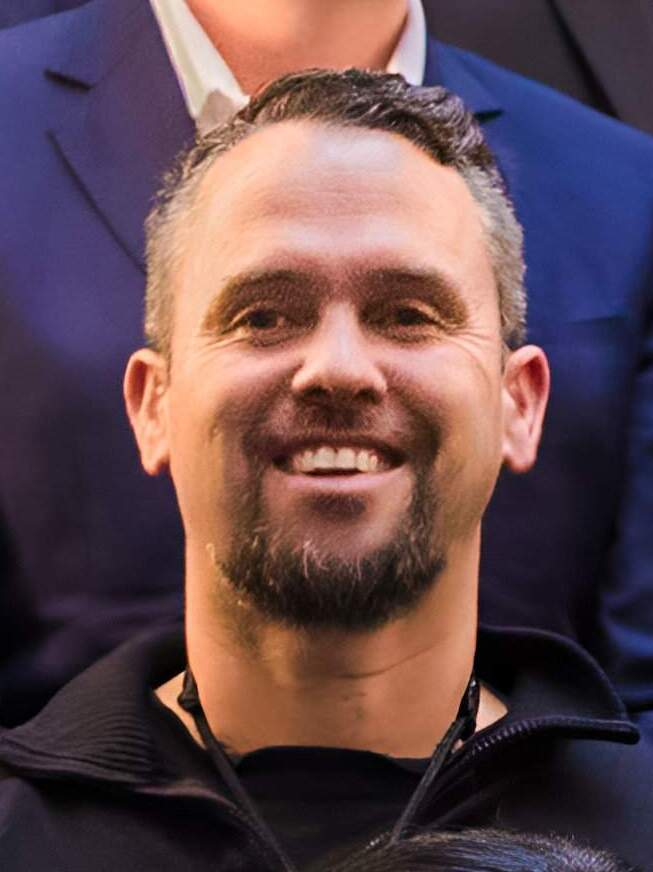
- Tākuta Ferris since 14 October 2023
- Party: Independent
- Previous MP: Rino Tirikatene (Labour)
Party vote distribution

Te Tai Tonga (lit. 'The South Coast') is a New Zealand parliamentary Māori electorate, returning one Member of Parliament to the New Zealand House of Representatives. It was established for the 1996 general election, replacing Southern Maori. It covers all of the South Island, Stewart Island, the Chatham Islands, and parts of both Wellington City and the Hutt Valley. The current MP for Te Tai Tonga is Tākuta Ferris a former member of the Te Pāti Māori but is now an independent.

== Population centres ==
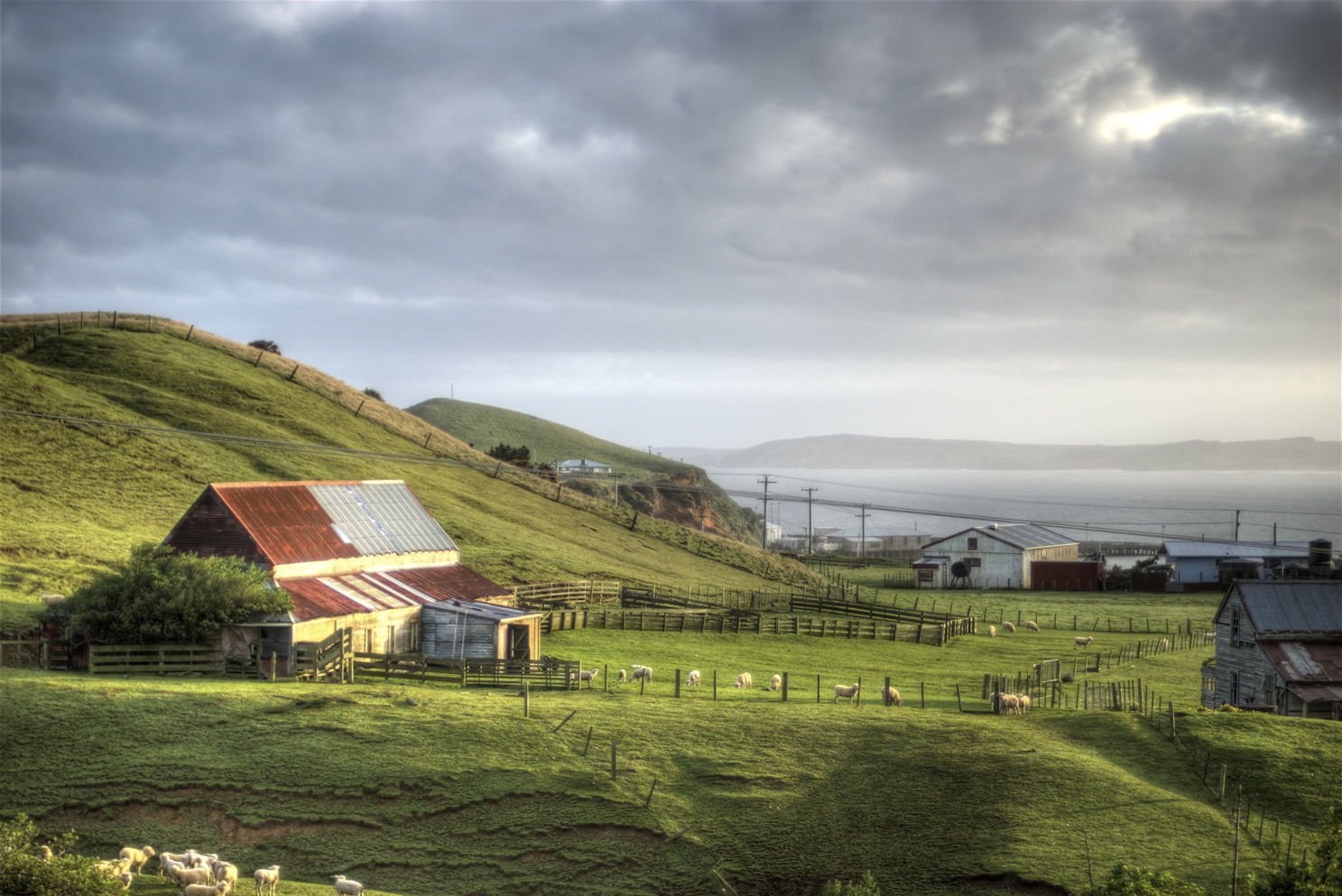
Chatham Islands farm

Te Tai Tonga is geographically by far the largest of the seventy-one electorates of New Zealand, covering all of the South Island, Stewart Island, the Chatham Islands, all the islands in the Southern Ocean and a large part of the Wellington urban area, namely Wellington City as far as Churton Park, and Lower Hutt City south of Naenae and west of Wainuiomata. Besides Wellington, the main centres in Te Tai Tonga are Nelson, Christchurch, Timaru, Oamaru, Dunedin, Queenstown, and Invercargill.

As a Māori electorate, Te Tai Tonga overlaps with the sixteen South Island electorates, as well as Rongotai and Wellington Central, and parts of Ōhāriu and Hutt South.

Te Tai Tonga's size was marginally decreased after a review of boundaries in 2007, when the suburbs of Naenae and Taitā were moved into Ikaroa-Rāwhiti. The 2013/14 redistribution did not further alter the boundaries of the electorate. The 2019/20 redistribution adjusted the north-east boundary to align with the northern boundary of Hutt South. The 2025 redistribution saw the Lower Hutt suburbs of Petone and Eastbourne transferred to Ikaroa-Rāwhiti.

The main iwi of Te Tai Tonga are Ngāi Tahu/Kāi Tahu, Kāti Māmoe and Waitaha, and in the North Island, Te Āti Awa ki Whakarongotai, Ngāti Toa Rangatira and Ngāti Poneke, that latter of which is not iwi in the traditional sense, but an urban pan-tribal grouping. The Chatham Islands was invaded by members of Ngāti Mutunga and Ngāti Tama, and their descendants live there today, alongside the indigenous Moriori.

== History ==
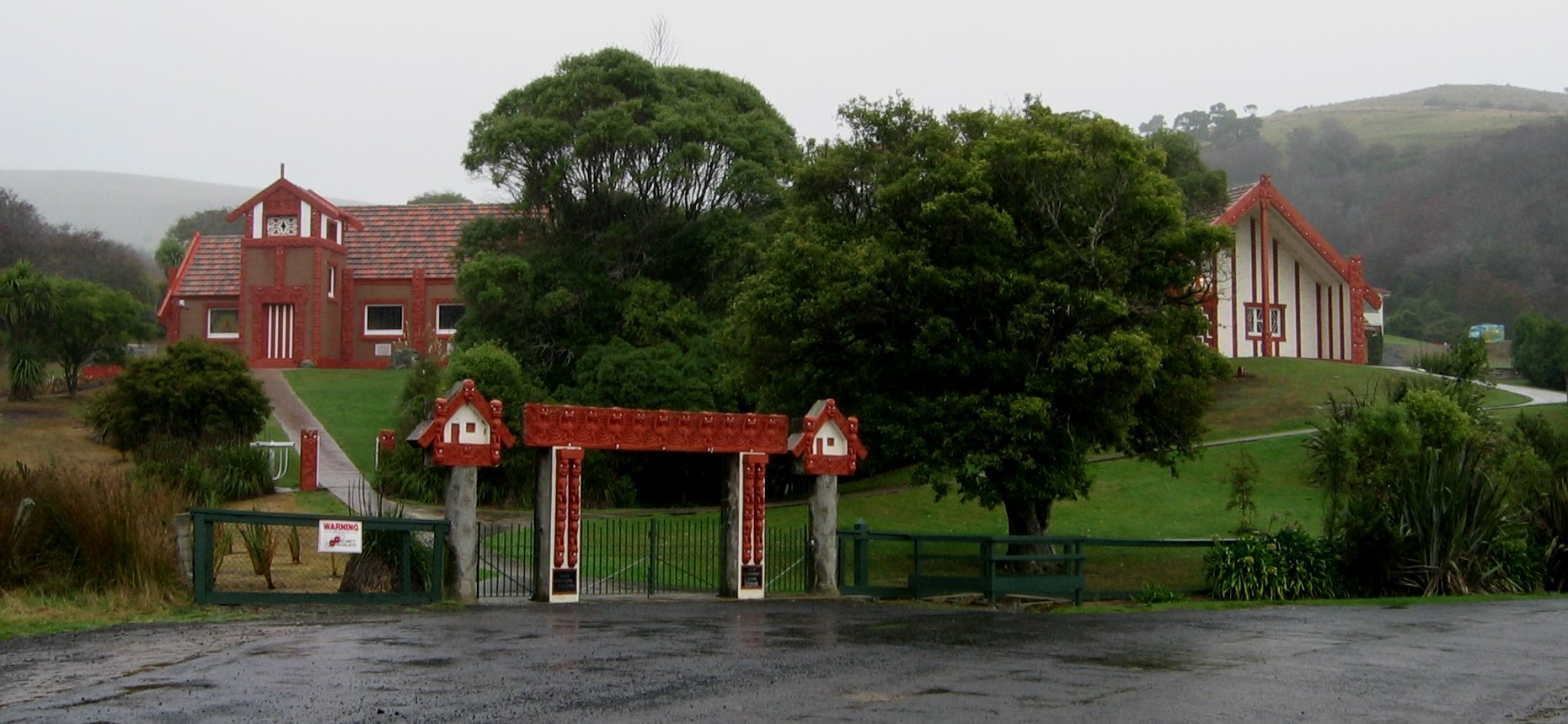
Ōtākou marae, near Dunedin

Te Tai Tonga was established for the 1996 general election, replacing Southern Maori which had existed since the first Māori elections in 1868. The 1996 election was the first to use the Mixed Member Proportional (MMP) voting system and a new formula for calculating the number of electorates, which resulted in an increase in the number of Māori electorates from four to five.

The main difference involves the separation of the Wairarapa and Hawke's Bay into seats wholly located in the North Island—initially Te Puku O Te Whenua, and since 1999 Ikaroa-Rāwhiti.

Whetū Tirikatene-Sullivan had served as Southern Maori's representative in Parliament since 1967—during the terms of five different governments and nine Prime Ministers. However, the New Zealand First Party challenger Tū Wyllie tipped her out of the seat in 1996, as sixty years of Labour Party control of the Māori electorates ended.

In 1999 New Zealand First lost its electoral footing after an unpopular term in office, firstly as junior government-coalition partner and then following an internal split in the party, with much of the party's original parliamentary caucus leaving the party ("waka-jumping") to prop up the government of Jenny Shipley (although Wyllie himself did not join the breakaway group). Along with a drop in the New Zealand First vote from thirteen to four percent nationwide came the return of the Māori electorates to Labour and the election of Mahara Okeroa to Parliament as the Labour Party MP for Te Tai Tonga.

A political difference of opinion between many Māori and the Labour Party emerged in 2004, when Helen Clark's Labour government introduced the Seabed and Foreshore Bill, claiming the coastline for the Crown and in the process providing the catalyst for the launch of the Māori Party (7 July 2004), which went on to win four of the seven Māori seats (but not the plurality of the party votes cast in those seats) at the 2005 general election. Te Tai Tonga did not form part of this electoral sea-change, with Okeroa's majority slashed from 8,000 to around 2,500 despite his facing two fewer contenders than in 2002.

Rahui Katene won the electorate for the Māori Party in the 2008 election, defeating the incumbent. She was defeated after a single term; Rino Tirikatene, the nephew of Tirikatene-Sullivan, won the electorate in 2011 with a margin of 1,475 votes. He was returned in the 2014 and 2017 elections with increased majorities.

=== Members of Parliament ===
Key

NZ First Labour Te Pāti Māori Green

Election	Winner
1996 election	Tu Wyllie
1999 election	Mahara Okeroa
2002 election	Mahara Okeroa
2005 election	Mahara Okeroa
2008 election	Rahui Katene
2011 election	Rino Tirikatene
2014 election	Rino Tirikatene
2017 election	Rino Tirikatene
2020 election	Rino Tirikatene
2023 election	Tākuta Ferris
2026 election	Mananui Ramsden

=== List MPs ===
Members of Parliament elected from party lists in elections where that person also unsuccessfully contested the Te Tai Tonga electorate. Unless otherwise stated, all MPs terms began and ended at general elections.

Election	Winner
2005 election	Metiria Turei
2023 election	Rino Tirikatene

== Election results ==
=== 2026 election ===
The next election will be held on 7 November 2026. Candidates for Te Tai Tonga are listed at Candidates in the 2026 New Zealand general election by electorate § Te Tai Tonga. Official results will be available after 27 November 2026.

=== 2023 election ===
2023 general election: Te Tai Tonga
Notes:	Blue background denotes the winner of the electorate vote. Pink background denotes a candidate elected from their party list. Yellow background denotes an electorate win by a list member, or other incumbent. A ✓ or ✗ denotes status of any incumbent, win or lose respectively.						
Party	Candidate	Votes	%	±%	Party votes	%	±%
Te Pāti Māori	Tākuta Ferris	12,828	46.80	+21.39	6,447	22.69	+14.00
Labour	✗ Rino Tirikatene	10,004	36.49	–12.39	10,396	36.59	–22.11
Legalise Cannabis	Rebecca Rae Robin	2,852	10.40	+4.48	479	1.68	–0.43
Independent	Geoffrey Karena Fuimaono Puhi	816	2.97	—			
Green					4,605	16.20	+4.82
National					2,453	8.63	+2.99
NZ First					1,557	5.48	+2.08
ACT					659	2.31	–0.44
Opportunities					549	1.93	+0.10
NZ Loyal					471	1.65	—
Freedoms NZ					156	0.54	—
NewZeal					122	0.42	—
DemocracyNZ					68	0.28	—
Animal Justice					50	0.17	—
Leighton Baker Party					50	0.17	—
Women's Rights					22	0.07	—
New Nation					12	0.42	—
New Conservatives					11	0.38	–0.31
Informal votes		910			302		
Total valid votes		27,410			28,409		
Te Pāti Māori gain from Labour	Majority	2,824	10.30	–13.17			

=== 2020 election ===
2020 general election: Te Tai Tonga
Notes:	Blue background denotes the winner of the electorate vote. Pink background denotes a candidate elected from their party list. Yellow background denotes an electorate win by a list member, or other incumbent. A ✓ or ✗ denotes status of any incumbent, win or lose respectively.						
Party	Candidate	Votes	%	±%	Party votes	%	±%
Labour	✓ Rino Tirikatene	14,277	48.88	+4.44	17,543	58.70	+2.90
Māori Party	Tākuta Ferris	7,422	25.41	+4.44	2,596	8.69	+0.29
Green	Ariana Paretutanganui-Tamati	3,324	11.38	–13.12	3,448	11.54	+3.42
Legalise Cannabis	Anituhia McDonald	1,732	5.92	–1.00	631	2.11	+0.95
Advance NZ	Matiu Thoms	965	3.30	—	635	2.12	—
New Conservative	Raymond Tuhaka	606	2.07	—	208	0.69	+0.61
National					1,685	5.64	–6.83
NZ First					1,030	3.45	–4.35
ACT					822	2.75	+2.55
Opportunities					547	1.83	—
Vision NZ					130	0.43	—
ONE					98	0.33	—
Outdoors					58	0.19	+0.14
Sustainable NZ					15	0.05	—
Heartland					7	0.02	—
Social Credit					7	0.02	—
TEA					5	0.01	—
Informal votes		879			417		
Total valid votes		29,205			29,882		
Labour hold	Majority	6,855	23.47	+3.52			

=== 2017 election ===
2017 general election: Te Tai Tonga
Notes:	Blue background denotes the winner of the electorate vote. Pink background denotes a candidate elected from their party list. Yellow background denotes an electorate win by a list member, or other incumbent. A ✓ or ✗ denotes status of any incumbent, win or lose respectively.						
Party	Candidate	Votes	%	±%	Party votes	%	±%
Labour	✓ Rino Tirikatene	10,416	44.44	+2.67	13,484	55.80	+19.1
Green	Metiria Turei	5,740	24.50	+8.81	1,963	8.12	–8.29
Māori Party	Mei Reedy-Taare	4,915	20.97	–3.22	2,030	8.40	–2.79
Legalise Cannabis	Emma-Jane Mihaere Kingi	1,625	6.93	+1.96	280	1.16	–0.20
National					3,014	12.47	–2.45
NZ First					1,926	7.80	–5.02
Opportunities					944	3.91	—
Mana					123	0.51	–4.42 (Note: 2017 Mana Party swing is relative to the votes for Internet-Mana in 2014; it shared a party list with the Internet Party in the 2014 election)
Ban 1080					58	0.24	–0.24
ACT					48	0.20	+0.03
People's Party					20	0.82	—
Conservative					18	0.075	–0.68
Outdoors					11	0.046	—
United Future					10	0.041	–0.049
Internet					6	0.025	–4.905 (Note: 2017 Internet Party swing is relative to the votes for Internet-Mana in 2014; it shared a party list with Mana Party in the 2014 election)
Democrats					5	0.021	–0.5
Informal votes		738			226		
Total valid votes		24,166			23,434		
Labour hold	Majority	4,676	19.95	+2.37			

=== 2014 election ===
2014 general election: Te Tai Tonga
Notes:	Blue background denotes the winner of the electorate vote. Pink background denotes a candidate elected from their party list. Yellow background denotes an electorate win by a list member, or other incumbent. A ✓ or ✗ denotes status of any incumbent, win or lose respectively.						
Party	Candidate	Votes	%	±%	Party votes	%	±%
Labour	✓ Rino Tirikatene	8,445	41.77	+1.15	7,607	36.70	–1.82
Māori Party	Ngaire Button	4,891	24.19	–7.60	2,319	11.19	–2.30
Green	Dora Roimata Langsbury	3,173	15.69	+0.45	3,402	16.41	+0.59
Mana	Georgina Beyer	1,996	9.87	+1.73			
Legalise Cannabis	Emma-Jane Mihaere Kingi	1,005	4.97	+0.76	282	1.36	+0.06
Democrats	Hahona Rakiraki Tamati	165	0.84		15	0.07	−0.02
National					2,977	14.92	–0.56
NZ First					2,657	12.82	+4.06
Internet Mana					1,021	4.93	–0.99 (Note: 2014 Internet Mana swing is relative to the votes for Mana in 2011; it shared a party list with Internet in the 2014 election.)
Conservative					153	0.74	+0.06
Ban 1080					99	0.48	+0.48
ACT					35	0.17	–0.01
United Future					18	0.09	–0.15
Civilian					9	0.04	+0.04
Independent Coalition					8	0.04	+0.04
Focus					3	0.01	+0.01
Informal votes		545			125		
Total valid votes		20,220			20,730		
Labour hold	Majority	3,554	17.58	+8.75			

=== 2011 election ===
2011 general election: Te Tai Tonga
Notes:	Blue background denotes the winner of the electorate vote. Pink background denotes a candidate elected from their party list. Yellow background denotes an electorate win by a list member, or other incumbent. A ✓ or ✗ denotes status of any incumbent, win or lose respectively.						
Party	Candidate	Votes	%	±%	Party votes	%	±%
Labour	Rino Tirikatene	6,786	40.62	–1.18	6,791	38.52	–11.06
Māori Party	✗ Rahui Katene	5,311	31.79	–15.51	2,379	13.49	–8.76
Green	Dora Roimata Langsbury	2,546	15.24	+4.34	2,789	15.82	+8.61
Mana	Clinton Dearlove	1,360	8.14	+8.14	1,043	5.92	+5.92
Legalise Cannabis	Emma-Jane Mihaere Kingi	703	4.21	+4.21	230	1.30	+0.26
National					2,631	14.92	+3.78
NZ First					1,544	8.76	+3.20
Conservative					120	0.68	+0.68
United Future					43	0.24	+0.05
ACT					32	0.18	–0.48
Democrats					16	0.09	+0.06
Alliance					7	0.04	–0.03
Libertarianz					4	0.02	+0.003
Informal votes		840			268		
Total valid votes		16,706			17,629		
Labour gain from Māori Party	Majority	1,475	8.83	+14.34			

Electorate (as at 26 November 2011): 31,933

=== 2008 election ===
2008 general election: Te Tai Tonga
Notes:	Blue background denotes the winner of the electorate vote. Pink background denotes a candidate elected from their party list. Yellow background denotes an electorate win by a list member, or other incumbent. A ✓ or ✗ denotes status of any incumbent, win or lose respectively.						
Party	Candidate	Votes	%	±%	Party votes	%	±%
Māori Party	Rahui Katene	9,011	47.30		4,414	22.26	
Labour	✗ Mahara Okeroa	7,962	41.80		9,833	49.58	
Green	Dora Roimata Langsbury	2,076	10.90		1,430	7.21	
National					2,210	11.14	
NZ First					1,102	5.56	
Legalise Cannabis					207	1.04	
Bill and Ben					158	0.80	
ACT					131	0.66	
Progressive					122	0.62	
Family Party					76	0.38	
Kiwi					69	0.35	
United Future					38	0.19	
Alliance					14	0.07	
Workers Party					13	0.07	
Democrats					6	0.03	
Libertarianz					4	0.02	
Pacific					4	0.02	
RAM					2	0.01	
RONZ					0	0.00	
Informal votes		656			261		
Total valid votes		19,049			19,833		
Māori Party gain from Labour	Majority	1,049	5.51				

=== 2005 election ===
2005 general election: Te Tai Tonga
Notes:	Blue background denotes the winner of the electorate vote. Pink background denotes a candidate elected from their party list. Yellow background denotes an electorate win by a list member, or other incumbent. A ✓ or ✗ denotes status of any incumbent, win or lose respectively.						
Party	Candidate	Votes	%	±%	Party votes	%	±%
Labour	✓ Mahara Okeroa	9,015	47.23	–15.94	11,485	57.89	
Māori Party	Monte Ohia	6,512	34.12	+34.12	3,481	17.55	
Green	Metiria Turei	2,296	12.03		1,283	6.47	
Progressive	Russell Caldwell	705	3.69		169	0.85	
Destiny	Maru Samuel	559	2.93		235	1.18	
National					1,462	7.37	
NZ First					1,240	6.25	
United Future					211	1.06	
Legalise Cannabis					159	0.80	
ACT					58	0.29	
Alliance					14	0.07	
Christian Heritage					9	0.05	
Democrats					8	0.04	
Family Rights					7	0.04	
Libertarianz					4	0.02	
One NZ					4	0.02	
99 MP					3	0.02	
Direct Democracy					3	0.02	
RONZ					3	0.02	
Informal votes		655			322		
Total valid votes		19,087			19,838		
Labour hold	Majority	2,503	13.11	–38.99			

=== 2002 election ===
2002 general election: Te Tai Tonga
Notes:	Blue background denotes the winner of the electorate vote. Pink background denotes a candidate elected from their party list. Yellow background denotes an electorate win by a list member, or other incumbent. A ✓ or ✗ denotes status of any incumbent, win or lose respectively.						
Party	Candidate	Votes	%	±%	Party votes	%	±%
Labour	✓ Mahara Okeroa	9,760	61.30		8,157	50.61	
National	Bill Karaitiana	1,708	10.73		1,083	6.72	
Mana Māori	Jacqui Amohanga	1,469	9.23		481	2.98	
Alliance	Vern Winitana	802	5.04		409	2.54	
United Future	Winata Murray	704	4.42		512	3.18	
Christian Heritage	Dee Morgan	396	2,49		200	1.24	
Nga Iwi Morehu Movement	Jennifer Waitai-Rapana	344	2.16				
Independent	Chris Webster	267	1.68				
Green					2,048	12.71	
NZ First					1,956	12.14	
Legalise Cannabis					412	2.56	
Progressive					287	1.78	
ACT					216	1.34	
ORNZ					178	1.10	
One NZ					6	0.04	
NMP					4	0.02	
Informal votes		471			167		
Total valid votes		15,921			16,116		
Labour hold	Majority	8,052	50.58				

=== 1999 election ===
Refer to Candidates in the New Zealand general election 1999 by electorate#Te Tai Tonga for a list of candidates.

=== 1996 election ===
1996 general election: Te Tai Tonga
Notes:	Blue background denotes the winner of the electorate vote. Pink background denotes a candidate elected from their party list. Yellow background denotes an electorate win by a list member, or other incumbent. A ✓ or ✗ denotes status of any incumbent, win or lose respectively.						
Party	Candidate	Votes	%	±%	Party votes	%	±%
NZ First	Tutekawa Wyllie	7,657	37.99		6,576	32.47	
Labour	✗ Whetu Tirikatene-Sullivan	7,372	36.58		7,167	35.39	
Alliance	Hone Kaiwai	1,916	9.51		2,290	11.31	
Independent	Eva Rickard	1,220	6.05				
National	Cliff Bedwell	1,115	5.53		1,732	8.55	
Independent	Honty Whaanga-Morris	873	4.33				
Legalise Cannabis					896	4.42	
Mana Māori					667	3.29	
Christian Coalition					441	2.18	
ACT					232	1.15	
United NZ					52	0.26	
McGillicuddy Serious					37	0.18	
Te Tawharau					35	0.17	
Progressive Green					33	0.16	
Animals First					28	0.14	
Green Society					22	0.11	
Natural Law					12	0.06	
Superannuitants & Youth					9	0.04	
Ethnic Minority Party					7	0.03	
Conservatives					5	0.02	
Libertarianz					4	0.02	
Advance New Zealand					3	0.01	
Asia Pacific United					2	0.01	
Informal votes		279			182		
Total valid votes		20,153			20,250		
NZ First win new seat	Majority	285	1.41				
