= Sentencing (Reinstating Three Strikes) Amendment Act 2024 =

Proposed Act of Parliament in New Zealand

Sentencing (Reinstating Three Strikes) Amendment Bill

New Zealand Parliament
- Royal assent: 17 December 2024
- Administered by: Justice Committee

Legislative history
- Introduced by: Nicole McKee
- First reading: 25 June 2024
- Second reading: 12 December 2024
- Third reading: 13 December 2024
- Status: Current legislation

The Sentencing (Reinstating Three Strikes) Amendment Act 2024 is a New Zealand Act of Parliament that restores the three-strikes sentencing regime that was repealed in 2022. The bill would cover 42 serious violent and sexual offenses including new strangulation and suffocation offences. The Reinstating Three Strikes Bill is one of the key policies of the Sixth National Government that was elected following the 2023 New Zealand general election. On 13 December, the legislation passed into law with the support of the governing National, ACT and New Zealand First parties. The bill came into force on 17 June 2025.

== Background ==
In May 2010, the Fifth National Government passed the Sentencing and Parole Reform Act 2010 (SPRA), which introduced a three-strikes law sentencing regime for repeat offenders. While it was supported by the centre-right National and libertarian ACT parties, the Sentencing and Parole Reform Act was opposed by the opposition Labour and Green parties as well as National's confidence and supply partner the Māori Party. The SPRA was controversial in New Zealand following its passage. While critics objected to its punitive approach to justice and disproportionate impact on the Māori community, supporters such as the Sensible Sentencing Trust and Family First New Zealand contended that it protected the public from the worst offenders.

During the 2017 New Zealand general election, Labour had campaigned on repealing the SPRA if elected into government. However the Sixth Labour Government had been forced to abandon its plans to repeal the law in 2018 due to the objection of its coalition partner New Zealand First. Following the 2020 New Zealand general election, Labour won a landslide victory, allowing it to govern alone for the first time since the mixed-member proportional representation (MMP) system was introduced in 1996. On 9 August 2022, Labour passed legislation repealing the Sentencing and Parole Reform Act with the support of the allied Green Party and Te Pāti Māori. In response, the opposition National and ACT parties vowed to reinstate three-strikes legislation if they won the 2023 New Zealand general election.

== Key provisions ==
The Reinstating Three Strikes Amendment Bill's regime will cover the same 40 serious violent and sexual offences as the former Sentencing and Parole Reform Act 2010, with the addition of the new strangulation and suffocation offences. The three-strikes law applies to criminal sentences of 12 months and above. While an initial version of the legislation had set a minimum qualifying sentencing threshold of 24 months, this was lowered to 12 months at the select committee stage. However, the 24 months minimum sentencing threshold was retained for the second and third offenses.

As with the previous three-strikes legislation, first-strike offenders would receive a warning. For a second strike, they will be denied parole. For a third strike, offender will serve the maximum penalty without parole. The law imposes a non-parole period of 17 years for the second offence and 20 years for the third offence.

The Three Strikes Amendment Bill provides some judicial discretion to avoid manifestly unjust outcomes and address outlier cases. It also outlines principles and guidance to assist the courts' application of the new law. The Bill also provides a limited benefit for guilty pleas to avoid re-traumatising victims and to reduce court delays.

The Bill amends several laws including the Sentencing Act 2002, the Criminal Procedure Act 2011, the Criminal Procedure (Mentally Impaired Persons) Act 2003, the Evidence Act 2006, and the Parole Act 2002.

== Legislative history ==
=== Launch and regulatory impact statement ===
As part of the National Party's coalition agreement with ACT that was released on 24 November 2023, the Sixth National Government agreed to commit to restoring three-strikes legislation as part of several "tough on crime" policies.

On 11 April 2024, the Ministry of Justice released its regulatory impact statement into the Reinstating Three Strikes Bill. The Ministry's report found that the 2010 three strikes regime had resulted in disproportionate sentencing, did not reduce serious crime and that mandatory sentencing had created inflexibility for judges in imposing sentences. In response, the Ministry proposed increased judicial discretion for sentencing serious offenses, clearer guidance on the three-strikes regime for judges, introduce a threshold sentence of two years imprisonment, providing some benefits for guilty pleas, setting minimum penalties for second and third strike offenses and excluding offenses with a seven-year penalty from the three-strikes regime. The Ministry expressed concerned that reinstating the three-strikes regime would have a disproportionate impact on Māori and Pasifika New Zealanders, and that the legislation could create inconsistencies with the Treaty of Waitangi and New Zealand Bill of Rights Act 1990. Associate Justice Minister Nicole McKee subsequently amended the draft legislation to exclude low-level offending and reduce the risk of disproportionate sentencing.

On 22 April 2024, Prime Minister Christopher Luxon and McKee confirmed that the Government would proceed with plans to reintroduce three strikes legislation. Details of the new three strikes regime were released including the inclusion of strangulation and suffocation as three-strike offenses and a new requirement that three-strikes legislation would only apply to sentences above 24 years.

=== Introduction ===
On 25 June 2024, McKee introduced the legislation into Parliament. During its introduction, Justice Minister Paul Goldsmith said that the Reinstating Three Strikes legislation addressed the problems associated with the previous Sentencing and Parole Reform Act 2010. Goldsmith argued that the legislation was needed to send a strong message to serious offenders and to bring justice for victims including Māori, who made up the majority of the victims of crime. By contrast, Labour leader Chris Hipkins said that maximum sentences led to unfair sentencing outcomes and did little to combat crime.

=== First reading ===
The Bill passed its first reading on 25 June 2024 by a margin of 68 to 55 votes. While the National, ACT and New Zealand First parties supported the Bill, it was opposed by the opposition Labour, Green parties and Te Pāti Māori. The bill's sponsor McKee said that it would warn offenders about the consequences of serious repeat offending while emphasising that the law would give judges flexibility when imposing sentences.

Opposition MPs Duncan Webb, Tamatha Paul, Hana-Rawhiti Maipi-Clarke, Ginny Andersen and Tracey McLellan criticised the Reinstating Three Strikes Bill, arguing that previous legislation had failed to reduce reoffending, worsened mass incarceration and disproportionately affected Māori. Government MPs Tim Costley, Casey Costello, James Meager, Cameron Brewer and Paulo Garcia argued that the Bill would restore law and order, deter and punish serious repeat offenders, and make communities safer.

=== Select committee ===
The Reinstating Three Strikes Amendment Bill was subsequently referred to the Justice select committee. The Bill was open to public submissions between 27 June and 23 July 2024. The committee received 749 submissions from interested groups and individuals, and heard oral evidence from 41 submitters via video conference and in person at Wellington. The Children's Commissioner, New Zealand Bar Association, New Zealand Law Society, Pacific Lawyers Association, Human Rights Commission, Māori Law Society and the Law Association opposed the bill on various grounds including that it would disproportionately affect Māori and Pasifika New Zealanders, ignored the circumstance of individual offenders, failed to reduce the causes of crime, and conflicted with the Treaty of Waitangi, Bill of Rights and the recommendations of the United Nations Committee Against Torture.

On 22 October 2024, Nicole Mckee confirmed that the Government had agreed, following public consultation, to lower the threshold for first strike offenses from 24 months to 12 months and to activate three strikes warnings issued under the previous Sentencing and Parole Reform Act 2010 legislation where offenders met the new thresholds under the new legislation.

The justice select committee released its report on 3 December 2024. They proposed several amendments including lowering the "qualifying sentence threshold" for stage one offenders to 12 months; clarifying that offenders serving home detention instead of imprisonment would cease to have a record of a first warning; issuing warnings for offenders serving sentences longer than 12 months but shorter than 24 months; clarifying which courts could give three-strike offenders warnings; removing the requirement for courts to give written reasons for issuing minimum penalties; clarifying the criteria for courts to impose "the manifestly unjust exception" on offenders; cancelling warnings in the event that offenders were granted free or conditional pardons; and ensuring that strikes issued under the previous three-strikes regime would "carry on" under the new three strikes regime. The latter amendment was made in response to feedback from submitters arguing that warnings issued under the previous regime should remain valid under the new regime.

The committee also agreed to amend the Criminal Procedure (Mentally Impaired Persons) Act 2003 to allow three strikes offenders to be committed to a hospital or other secure facility. The Labour Party issued a dissenting report opposing the Reinstating Three Strikes Amendment Bill on the grounds that it did not reduce crime and victimisation. Similarly, the Green Party stated that it did not support the legislation.

=== Second reading ===
The Reinstating Three Strikes Amendment Bill passed its second reading on the night of 12 December 2024 by a margin of 68 to 454 along party lines. It was then submitted to a committee of the Whole House. Several government MPs including Nicole McKee, James Meager, Cameron Brewer, Rima Nakhle, Paulo Garcia, and David MacLeod gave speeches in favour of the bill. Costello and Meager argued that the legislation would priority victims of crime and public safety over criminals.

Several opposition MPs including Duncan Webb, Lawrence Xu-Nan, Hana-Rawhiti Maipi-Clarke, Hūhana Lyndon, Ginny Andersen, Tangi Utikere and Tracey McLellan gave speeches opposing the bill. Xu-Nan argued that punitive measures would increase reoffending while Maipi-Clark argued that the legislation and other "tough on crime" policies would disproportionately affect Māori. Andersen argued that other policies such as drug and alcohol treatment courts and Te Pae Oranga (iwi community panels) were more effective at combating crime and recidivism than three strikes legislation.

=== Third reading ===
On 13 December 2024, the Bill passed its third and final reading by a margin of 68 to 43 along party lines. Government MPs James Meager, Casey Costello, Cameron Brewer, Rima Nakhle, Paulo Garcia and David MacLeod spoke in favour in the bill while opposition MPs Duncan Webb, Lawrence Xu-Nan, Tākuta Ferris, Ricardo Menéndez March, Ginny Andersen, Arena Williams, Tracey McLellan spoke against the bill. McKee argued that the three strikes legislation would send a "strong message" to serious criminals while Meager argued that the legislation was focused on "deterrence and detention." Costello argued that the three strikes law was about justice to victims of "heinous crimes" including rape victims. Webb accused the Government of "pandering to a small section of the community which it seeks to nourish its hateful approaches to law and order" while Ferris said that the bill would reinforce what he regarded as a "racist" justice system.

The Bill received royal assent on 17 December 2024.

=== Implementation ===
The Reinstating Three Strikes Amendment Act 2024 came into force on 17 June 2025.

== Responses ==
=== Political parties ===
On 22 April 2024 Green Party's justice spokesperson Tamatha Paul opposed the Reinstating Three Strikes Bill, stating that it would disproportionately target Māori and contribute to New Zealand's high incarceration rate. Similarly, Labour justice spokesperson Duncan Webb said that three strikes sentencing regimes and other minimum sentencing laws did little to reduce serious crime and reoffending.

=== Civil society ===
The conservative justice advocacy group Sensible Sentencing Trust (SST) trustee Louise Parsons criticised the Reinstating Three Strikes Bill, describing the proposed law as "weak and watered-down." The Trust opposed the Government's decision to wipe 13,000 former strike warnings and said that the new legislation only affected 30% of offenders covered under the 2010 three-strikes sentencing regime. Parsons also said that the Trust would be reactivating to oppose the legislation and called on the Government to deliver a stronger version of the three-strikes law.

In mid October 2024, Radio New Zealand reported that 450 of the 763 select committee submissions of the three-strikes legislation were based on a template issued by the SST. When interviewed, Trust spokesperson Parsons said that the template was used to make it easier for citizens to engage with the legislative process.

== Statistics ==
Year	First warning	Final warning	Third strike
2025	0	–	–
