= Rino Tirikatene =

New Zealand politician

The Honourable Rino Tirikatene
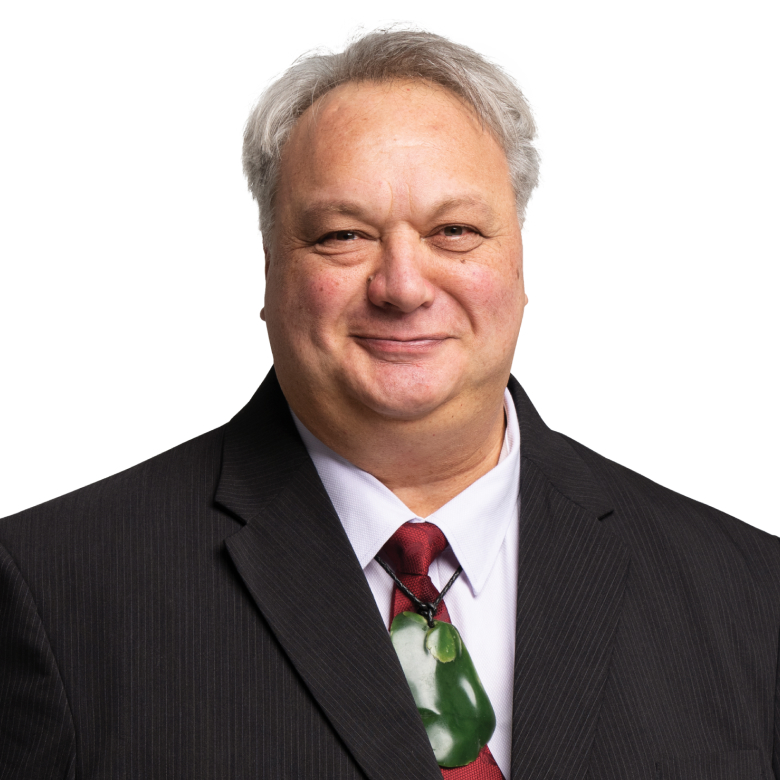
- Tirikatene in 2023

11th Minister for Courts
- In office 1 February 2023 – 27 November 2023
- Prime Minister: Chris Hipkins
- Preceded by: William Sio
- Succeeded by: Nicole McKee

Minister of State for Trade and Export Growth
- In office 1 February 2023 – 27 November 2023
- Prime Minister: Chris Hipkins
- Preceded by: William Sio
- Succeeded by: Nicola Grigg

Member of the New Zealand Parliament for Labour party list
- In office 14 October 2023 – 28 January 2024
- Succeeded by: Tracey McLellan

Member of the New Zealand Parliament for Te Tai Tonga
- In office 30 November 2011 – 14 October 2023
- Preceded by: Rahui Katene
- Succeeded by: Tākuta Ferris

Personal details
- Born: 1972 (age 53–54) Rangiora, New Zealand
- Party: Labour (1990 – 2024); New Zealand First (2026–present)
- Relations: Eruera Tirikatene (grandfather); Whetu Tirikatene-Sullivan (aunt)

Rino Tirikatene (born 1972) is a former member of the New Zealand Labour Party and the House of Representatives. He comes from a family with a strong political history.

Tirikatene represented the Te Tai Tonga Māori electorate from the 2011 election until the 2023 election, when he was returned to Parliament as a list MP. He retired from politics in January 2024. In July 2026, Tirikatane confirmed that he joined the New Zealand First party.

== Early life ==
Born in Rangiora, Tirikatene affiliates to the Ngāi Tahu and Ngāti Hine iwi. He is the grandson of Sir Eruera Tirikatene and the nephew of Whetu Tirikatene-Sullivan. His grandfather and aunt between them held the Southern Maori electorate for 64 years from 1932 to 1996. As such, the name Tirikatene is for many voters synonymous with the Māori electorate that covers the southern part of New Zealand.

Prior to running for parliament, Tirikatene worked as a commercial lawyer with Simpson Grierson and in a variety of Māori economic development roles.

== Member of Parliament ==
New Zealand Parliament
Years	Term	Electorate	List	Party
2011–2014	50th	Te Tai Tonga	45	Labour
2014–2017	51st	Te Tai Tonga	none	Labour
2017–2020	52nd	Te Tai Tonga	none	Labour
2020–2023	53rd	Te Tai Tonga	29	Labour
2023–2024	54th	List	21	Labour

=== In Opposition, 2011–2017 ===
Tirikatene stood for Labour in Te Puku O Te Whenua in the 1996 election. His father, Rino Tirikatene Senior, was originally selected for the seat but died suddenly on the campaign trail. Tirikatene was asked to replace his father. That year, New Zealand First won all Māori electorates, with Rana Waitai beating Tirikatene and Tu Wyllie defeating Whetu Tirikatene-Sullivan.

He was selected to represent Labour in the Te Tai Tonga electorate on 1 December 2010. Te Tai Tonga is one of the seven Māori electorates, covers the South Island plus Wellington and is New Zealand's largest electorate by area. In the 2011 New Zealand general election, Tirikatene was placed at number 45 on the Labour Party list.

He contested the Te Tai Tonga electorate against the incumbent, Rahui Katene of the Māori Party. Labour's selection of Tirikatene was criticised as cynical by Katene, as they are both from the same hapū, but this was rejected by Tirikatene, as "all Maoris connect up somewhere along the line". Tirikatene won the electorate with a margin of 1,475 votes. The electorate had previously been held by Labour, from 1999 until 2005.

In 2013, Tirikatene voted against the Marriage Amendment Bill, which aims to permit same sex marriage in New Zealand, with fellow Labour MPs William Sio, Ross Robertson and Damien O'Connor.

Tirikatene significantly increased his majority in the 2014 election and again in 2017. In Opposition for the six years of his Parliamentary career, Tirikatene served variously as the Labour Party spokesperson for customs, fisheries, tourism and Treaty of Waitangi negotiations, as well as holding a number of associate spokesperson roles.

=== In Government, 2017–2023 ===
When the Labour Party formed a coalition government in 2017, Tirikatene was appointed chairperson of the Māori Affairs select committee.

During the 2020 general election, Tirikatene was re-elected by a margin of 6,855 votes, retaining Te Tai Tonga for Labour.

In early November 2020, Tirikatane was appointed as Parliamentary Under-Secretary to the Minister for Oceans and Fisheries and Minister for Trade and Export Growth with responsibility for Māori Trade. In a cabinet reshuffle by Prime Minister Chris Hipkins on 31 January 2023 Tirikatene was appointed Minister for Courts and Minister of State for Trade and Export Growth.

=== In Opposition, 2023–2024 ===
During the 2023 general election, Tirikatane was unseated from his electorate seat by Te Pāti Māori (Māori Party) candidate Tākuta Ferris by a margin of 2,824 votes. Tirikatane was re-elected to Parliament on the Labour party list.

Following the formation of the National-led coalition government in late November 2023, Tirikatene became spokesperson for corrections and land information in the Shadow Cabinet of Chris Hipkins.

On 5 December 2023, Tirikatene was granted retention of the title The Honourable, in recognition of his term as a member of the Executive Council.

Tirakatene announced on 26 January 2024 that he would be resigning from Parliament with effect from 28 January, to "reset and take up new opportunities" – and would not be making a valedictory speech. The next candidate on Labour's party list, Tracey McLellan, would take up the seat vacated by Tirakatene.

=== New Zealand First, 2026–present ===
On 18 July 2026, Tirakatene confirmed that he had joined the New Zealand First party.

New Zealand Parliament
Preceded by Rahui Katene	Member of Parliament for Te Tai Tonga; 2011–2023	Succeeded by Tākuta Ferris
Political offices
Preceded by William Sio	Minister for Courts; 2023	Succeeded by Nicole McKee
