= Rob McLeod =

New Zealand tax specialist

Sir Rob McLeod KNZM
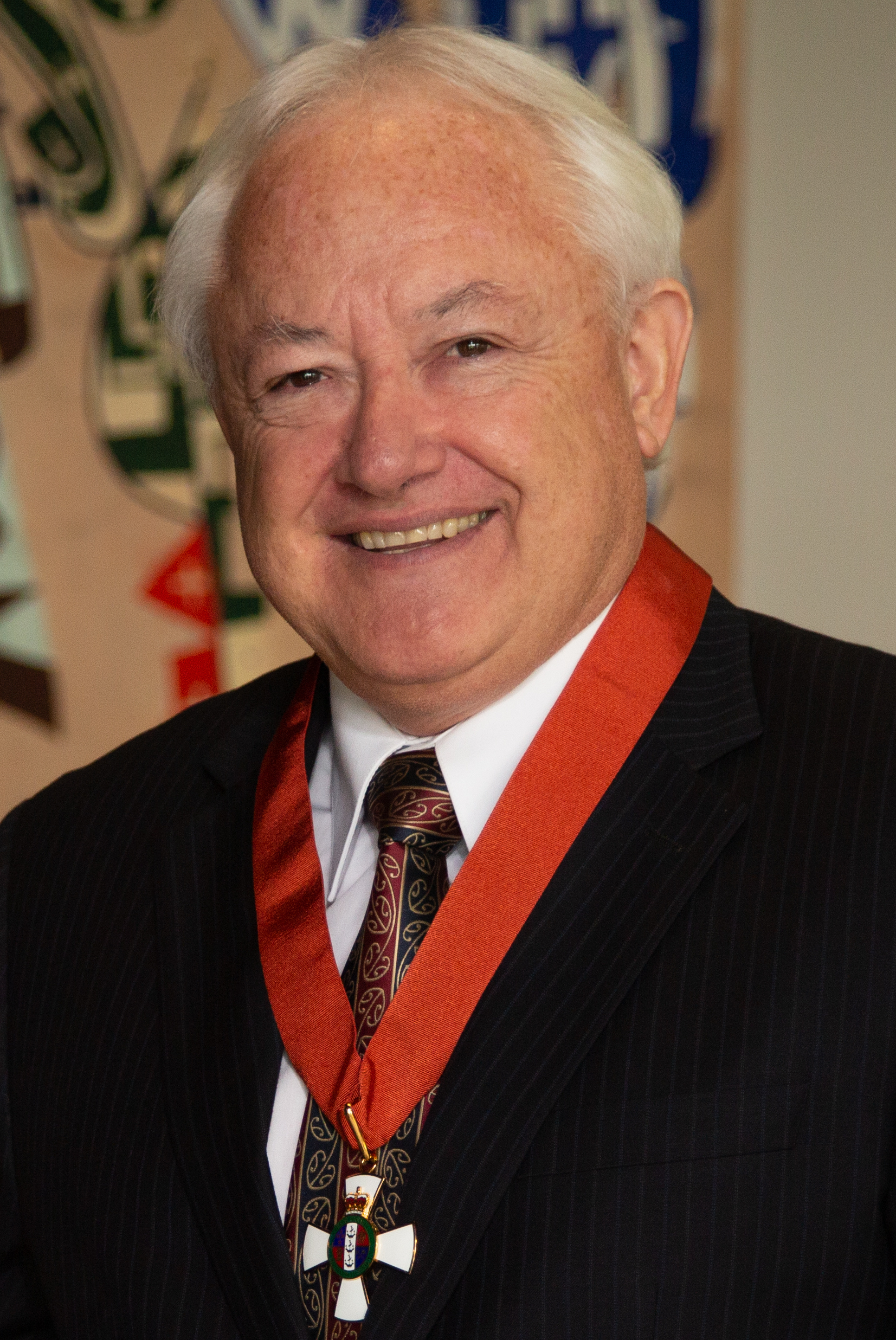
- McLeod in 2019

Personal details
- Born: Robert Arnold McLeod; 1957 or 1958 (age 68–69)
- Occupation: Tax specialist

Sir Robert Arnold McLeod KNZM (born 1957 or 1958) is a tax specialist in New Zealand. In the 2019 New Year Honours, he was appointed a Knight Companion of the New Zealand Order of Merit, for services to business and Māori.
