= Peter Talley =

New Zealand businessman

Sir Peter Talley KNZM
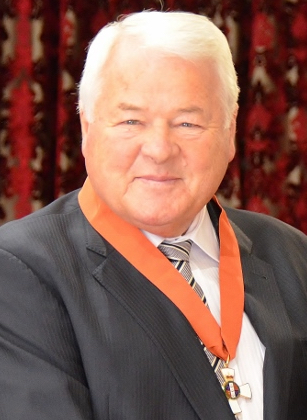
- Talley in 2015
- Born: Peter Ivan Talijancich
- Occupation: Businessman

Sir Peter Ivan Talijancich KNZM, generally known as Peter Talley, is a New Zealand businessman, known for his involvement in the fishing and food industries as the Managing Director of Talley's Group. In the 2002 New Year Honours, Talley was appointed as an Officer of the New Zealand Order of Merit, for services to the fishing industry, export and the community, and he was promoted to Knight Companion of the New Zealand Order of Merit, for services to business and philanthropy, in the 2015 Queen's Birthday Honours.
