= Phil O'Reilly =

Irish Gaelic footballer (1933–2026)

Personal information
- Native name: Pilib Ó Raghallaigh (Irish)
- Born: 16 November 1933 Tullamore, County Offaly, Ireland
- Died: 30 August 2026 (aged 92) Tullamore, County Offaly, Ireland
- Occupation: Undertaker
- Height: 5 ft 11 in (180 cm)

Sport
- Sport: Gaelic football
- Position: Right wing-back
Club
- Years: Club
- Tullamore
Club titles
- Offaly titles: 3
Inter-county
Years	County	Apps (scores)
1956–1964	Offaly	17 (0–00)
Inter-county titles
- Leinster titles: 2
- All-Irelands: 0
- NFL: 0

Philip O'Reilly (16 November 1933 – 30 August 2026) was an Irish Gaelic footballer. At club level he played with Tullamore and at inter-county level with the Offaly senior football team.

== Career ==
Philip O'Reilly was born on 16 November 1933 in Tullamore, County Offaly, where he was also raised. He was educated at Tullamore CBS, where he played Gaelic football as a back and as a forward. He later attended Belcamp College and was at full-forward during the Leinster Colleges SFC campaign in 1951.

O'Reilly first played Gaelic football and hurling at underage levels with Tullamore. He was part of the Tullamore minor teams that won the Offaly MFC and MHC double in 1950. O'Reilly progressed to adult level and won the Offaly IFC title in 1953. This was followed by Offaly SFC titles in 1954, 1956 and 1963.

At inter-county level, O'Reilly was a substitute on Offaly's minor hurling team in 1950. He made his Offaly senior football team debut in a National Football League game against Laois in February 1956. O'Reilly was wing back on the team that captured the Offaly's first Leinster SFC title in 1960. They retained the title the following year before losing the 1960 All-Ireland SFC final to Down before a record attendance of over 90,000 at Croke Park. O'Reilly made the last of 59 appearances in December 1963.

== Personal life and death ==
In retirement from playing, O'Reilly went on to serve various roles in the Tullamore club. His son, Phil O'Reilly Jnr, also played with Offaly and won Offaly SFC titles with Tullamore as both captain and manager. O'Reilly had his own undertaker business in Tullamore.

O'Reilly died on 30 August 2026, at the age of 92.

== Honours ==
Tullamore

- Offaly Senior Hurling Championship (3): 1954, 1956, 1963
- Offaly Intermediate Hurling Championship (1): 1953
- Offaly Minor Hurling Championship (1): 1950
- Offaly Minor Football Championship (1): 1950

Offaly

- Leinster Senior Football Championship (2): 1960, 1961
