= Tu Wyllie =

New Zealand politician and rugby union player

Tutekawa Wyllie
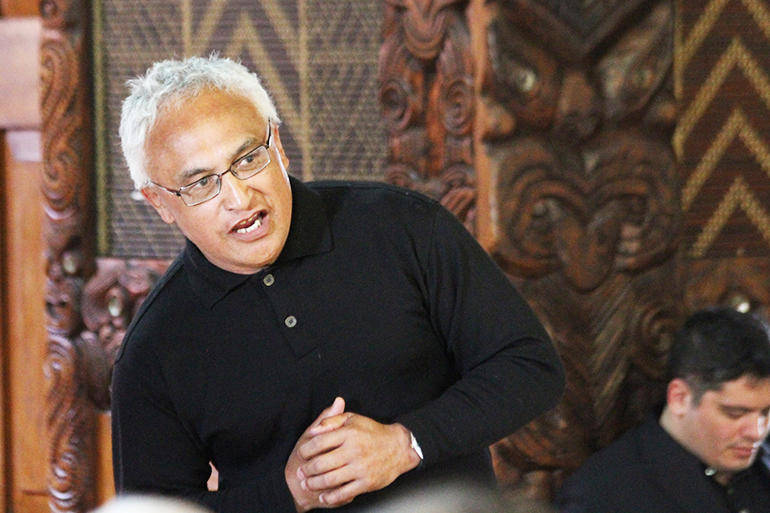
- Wyllie in 2013
- Born: Tutekawa Wyllie; 24 October 1954 (age 72) Manutuke, New Zealand
- Height: 1.63 m (5 ft 4 in)
- Weight: 69 kg (152 lb)
- School: Gisborne Boys' High School
- University: Victoria University of Wellington

Rugby union career
- Position: First five-eighth
Provincial / State sides
| Years | Team | Apps | (Points) |
| 1978–83 | Wellington | 86 | (84) |
- Correct as of 19 December 2023
International career
| Years | Team | Apps | (Points) |
| 1980 | New Zealand | 1 | (4) |
| 1979–82 | New Zealand Māori | 13 | (4) |

Member of the New Zealand Parliament for Te Tai Tonga
- In office 1996–1999
- Preceded by: New constituency
- Succeeded by: Mahara Okeroa
- Majority: 285

Personal details
- Party: New Zealand First

Tutekawa "Tu" Wyllie (born 24 October 1954) is a former New Zealand politician and rugby union player. A first five-eighth, Wyllie represented Wellington at a provincial level, and played one match for the New Zealand national side, the All Blacks, in 1980. He was the New Zealand First Member of Parliament for Te Tai Tonga from 1996 to 1999.

== Early life ==
Born in Manutuke, Wyllie affiliates to the Ngāi Tāmanuhiri, Ngāti Ruapani and Rongowhakaata iwi. He was educated at Gisborne Boys' High School where he played rugby for the 1st XV. He then went to Victoria University of Wellington, where he studied law. He worked as a bus driver, court clerk, teacher trainee and as a bureaucrat in the Ministry of Education, Iwi Transition Agency and the Department of Health.

== Rugby career ==
While at Victoria, Wyllie played rugby league for New Zealand Universities between 1975 and 1977. He then played representative rugby union for Wellington from 1978 to 1983 and New Zealand Māori from 1979 to 1982. In the off-seasons he played overseas, in Ireland, the United States, Germany and France. His sole appearance for the All Blacks came in 1980, when he played against the touring Fijian side, scoring a try. The game was not recognised as a full international.

== Member of Parliament ==
New Zealand Parliament
| Years | Term | Electorate | List | Party |
|---|---|---|---|---|
| 1996–1999 | 45th | Te Tai Tonga | 36 | NZ First |

Wyllie represented Te Tai Tonga as a member of Parliament from 1996 to 1999 for the New Zealand First Party.

He defeated 29-year parliamentary veteran Whetu Tirikatene-Sullivan with a majority of 285 votes enabling New Zealand First to capture all five Māori electorates in the 1996 election (including Te Tai Tonga). When the Tight five led by Tau Henare splintered from New Zealand First and created the Mauri Pacific party, Wyllie chose to remain loyal to the party core. During the 1999 election he sought re-election as MP for Te Tai Tonga, but chose not to stand on the party list. He was defeated by Mahara Okeroa of the Labour Party by 4522 votes.

During his term in Parliament, Wyllie also played for the parliamentary rugby team.

== Post Parliamentary career ==
=== Protest against the sale of Young Nicks head ===
Following his defeat in the 1999 election Wyllie returned to Gisborne in an effort to assist Ngai Tamanuhiri to prevent the sale of Young Nick's Head (Te Kuri), a place of historical, and spiritual significance to local Māori. Wyllie stated that "It is the absolute jewel in the crown because Young Nick’s Head, or Te Kuri as we know it, is our equivalent to Hikurangi for Ngāti Porou and Aorangi or Aoraki for Ngāi Tahu. It is our mountain, it is what identifies us as an iwi and we have some real issues about what’s going to happen to it in the future". Ngai Tamanuhri tribal members led by Wyllie conducted a protest march and pitched their tents on the grounds of New Zealand Parliament.

He later lost his mandate as iwi spokesperson after he filed a judicial application to overturn Michael Cullen's decision to approve the sale of the landmark. Young Nicks Head was consequently sold to American millionaire John Griffin.

=== Health issues ===
Wyllie was diagnosed with chronic traumatic encephalopathy (CTE), having suffered numerous concussions during his rugby career. As of early 2023, he was no longer able to speak or move unaided.

New Zealand Parliament
| New constituency | Member of Parliament for Te Tai Tonga; 1996–1999 | Succeeded by Mahara Okeroa |
