= Sensible Sentencing Trust =

New Zealand political advocacy group

Current logo

The Sensible Sentencing Trust (SST) is a political advocacy group based in Napier, New Zealand. The Trust's stated goal is "to educate both the public and victims of serious violent and/or sexual crime and homicide". It focuses on advocating for the rights of victims and tougher penalties against offenders. In late 2018, founder Garth McVicar stepped down as leader of the Trust. In January 2021, former New Zealand First Member of Parliament Darroch Ball became the Trust's leader. In late June 2024, the Sensible Sentencing Trust reactivated to lobby for a tougher three strikes law.

== Goals and issues ==
The Sensible Sentencing Trust's stated sole purpose in 2022 was "to educate both the public and victims of serious violent and/or sexual crime and homicide." Key goals included educating victims of their rights and entitlements, educating the public about the light of victims, and supporting victims of crime through education, trauma support, accessing protection, and providing social rehabilitation.

The Trust has campaigned for several goals including:

- tightening criteria for name suppression
- adding burglary to the schedule of "three strikes" offenses
- imposing mandatory maximum sentences on unprovoked attacks
- introducing a "degrees of murder" sentencing regime including a "life means life" provision for first degree murder
- replacing the "Not Guilty By Reason of Insanity" (NGBRI) verdict with one of "Proven, but insane"
- amending the definition of "reckless murder" in the Crimes Act 1961 to include kicking and stomping the victim's head
- introducing the offense of home invasion to the Crime Act 1961
- establishing a Victims Commissioner
- abolishing parole
- introducing cumulative sentencing
- compensating jurors based on their income rate
- tightening the criteria for restorative justice.

== Organisational structure ==
The Sensible Sentencing Trust consists of two separate trusts.

1. The Sensible Sentencing Trust (SST) which advocates on behalf of victims of serious violent and/or sexual crime and homicide in New Zealand. SST is a registered charitable trust which does not have donee status with the Inland Revenue Department (IRD).
2. The Sensible Sentencing Group Trust (SSGT) which serves to educate the public as to the plight of victims and to ensure such victims and their families are fully aware of their rights and entitlements, providing both education and practical support during their time of trauma. SSGT is a registered charitable trust which has donee status with the Inland Revenue Department.

== History ==
The Sensible Sentencing Trust logo under Garth McVicar.

=== Formation ===
The Sensible Sentencing Trust was formed by Garth McVicar in 2001 in response to the prosecution and trial of Mark Middleton for threatening to kill Paul Dally who tortured, raped, and killed Middleton's 13-year-old stepdaughter Karla Cardno in 1989. Due to public sympathy for Middleton over Dally's crimes, Judge Michael Lance sentenced Middleton to nine months' jail suspended for two years. McVicar supported Middleton during his trial.

Following Middleton's prosecution and trial, McVicar and 30 supporters established the Sensible Sentencing Trust to advocate for tougher sentencing for violent offenders including life imprisonment. Membership quickly grew to 135,000 by 2002. In addition, the Trust attracted 3,000 donors and chapters were established across New Zealand. In addition, the Trust established a youth division.

By 2009, McVicar claimed that the Trust had over 150,000 members including between 15 and 20 Members of Parliament including former ACT MPs David Garrett and Stephen Franks. Notable Trust members have included Stephen Couch and Rita Coskery. Couch was the sister of Susan Couch, a survivor of a 2001 triple homicide at the Panmure Returned and Services' Association (RSA) club perpetrated by William Dwane Bell. Couch as a Trust Member has advocated the reintroduction of capital punishment and three strikes legislation. Coskery was the mother of Auckland pizza delivery driver Michael Choy, who was assaulted and murdered by several youths including Bailey Junior Kurariki.

=== Campaigns ===
The Sensible Sentencing Trust has claimed credit for pushing several changes in the New Zealand justice system favouring victims including:

- lobbying for the Sentencing Parole and Reform Bill 2001, which increased the sentence for murder from 10 to 17 years.
- bail reforms in 2007 which increased the minimum non parole period for violent, sexual and drug offenders.
- placing victims' rights on the political radar
- lobbying for the Prisoner and Victims' Claims Bill to prevent criminals from profiting from their crimes in 2004.
- a $50 Offender Levy in 2009
- supported the Sentencing and Parole Reform Act 2010, which provided for progressively increased sentencing for repeat offenders within a category of 40 listed violent and sexual offences.
- securing compensation for Panmure RSA survivor Sue Crouch from the Department of Corrections.
- the introduction of Bail Amendment and Victims of Crime Reform legislation.
- lobbying for the retention of the Sentencing and Parole Reform Act 2010 including commissioning a public opinion poll.
- launching a campaign to stop recidivist impaired drivers.
- sponsoring a petition in May 2021 calling for tougher legislation against "coward punch" attacks following the death of mixed martial artist Fau Vake.

In December 2008, the Sensible Sentencing Trust condemned the manslaughter conviction of Bruce Emery, who was convicted of killing a teenage tagger. Spokesperson McVicar regarded the verdict as a shame, contending that Emery was forced to take the law into his own hands.

=== Loss of charitable status and reorganisation ===
In 2010, the Trust's tax-free charitable status was revoked by the Charities Commission, on the grounds that it had become a political lobby group rather than a charity. In response, McVicar accused the Charities Commission of "muzzling organisations like us that are rocking the boat a little bit". To comply with the Charities Commission's requirements, McVicar announced that the Trust would split into two separate organisations: a charity advocating for victims of crime called the Sensible Sentencing Group Trust and a separate non-charitable political arm that would lobby for harsher criminal penalties called the Sensible Sentencing Trust.

=== Election activities ===
The Trust was a registered electoral promoter at the 2011 general election.

The Trust did not register as a promoter for the 2014 general election, but founder McVicar contended the Napier electorate and the party list as a member of the Conservative Party. Former trust member Ruth Money criticised McVicar's decision to align the Trust with a political party due to revelations that former Conservative leader Colin Craig had sexually harassed former secretary Rachel MacGregor. Money had advocated for MacGregor and opined that McVicar's decision was the "beginning of the end" of his leadership.

=== Online offenders' database ===
In early 2002, the Trust established an online offender database in response to the New Zealand Government's refusal to undertake this task, in spite of repeated requests to do so.

In mid-January 2014, the Trust launched a new website and updated offender database. The SST claimed that the Trust would protect the public and help keep offenders accountable for their crimes. McVicar also announced that the organisation would publish two databases; one for Serious Violent Offenders and one for Paedophiles and Sexual Offenders. At its launch, the updated database contained over 5,000 criminal records with information on release conditions, previous convictions, and a Database Sentencing Tracker for viewing the sentence length of offenders.

Following a privacy breach in 2014, the Trust agreed to provide training to volunteers, but only one person was trained and they left shortly after.

In December 2018, the Privacy Commissioner John Edwards chastised the Trust for wrongfully misidentifying a man as a pedophile on its online database for almost two years. He stated that the Trust had a "continuously negligent, cavalier, and dangerous approach to privacy." In response to criticism by the Privacy Commissioner, McVicar admitted that the organisation "absolutely cocked up and deserved to be publicly identified." He also confirmed that the Trust would correct the inaccurate information on its database. However, he criticised Edwards for making an issue of identifying the Trust while not calling for the names of recidivist violent offenders to be placed in a publicly accessible database.

=== Interregnum, 2018–2024 ===
In December 2018, McVicar stepped down as leader of the Sensible Sentencing Trust and was succeeded by his youngest daughter Jess McVicar, who became the organisation's National Spokesperson.

In January 2021, former New Zealand First Member of Parliament Darroch Ball became the co-leader of the Sensible Sentencing Trust alongside Jess McVicar. As co-leader, Ball criticised the Green Party Co-Leader and minister Marama Davidson for attending a function hosted by the Mongrel Mob gang.

=== Louise Parson, 2024–present ===
On 25 June 2024, the Sensible Sentencing Trustee Louise Parsons announced that the Trust would be "reactivating" to oppose the National-led coalition government's proposed Sentencing (Reinstating Three Strikes) Amendment Bill. In a press release, the Trust described the proposed law as "weak and watered-down" and took issue with the Government to wipe 13,000 former strike warnings and its higher threshold for crimes that would fall under the three-strikes legislation. It urged the Government to deliver a stronger version of the three-strikes law.

On 23 October 2024, Radio New Zealand reported that 450 of the 763 select committee submissions of the three-strikes legislation were based on a template provided by the Sensible Sentencing Trust. Following public consultation at the select committee stage, the New Zealand Cabinet agreed to lower the threshold for first strike offences from 24 months to 12 months and to activate three strikes warnings issued under the previous Sentencing and Parole Reform Act 2010 legislation where offenders met the new thresholds under the new legislation. The Sixth National Government's new three strikes legislation passed into law on 13 December 2024.

On 7 April 2025 the Sensible Sentencing Trust funded billboard attack ads against Green Party MP Tamatha Paul's comments on police and co-leader Chlöe Swarbrick the month before. Paul had drawn criticism from Labour Party leader Chris Hipkins, Prime Minister Christopher Luxon, New Zealand First leader Winston Peters and ACT Party leader David Seymour in late March 2025 for accusing the New Zealand Police of targeting ethnic minorities. On 11 April, The Post reported that the SST had hired a digital campaign company called "The Campaign Company" to produce billboard ads attacking Paul and Greens co-leader Chlöe Swarbrick. The Campaign Company is owned by New Zealand Taxpayers' Union director Jordan Williams. On 14 April, the Advertising Standards Authority confirmed that it was investigating complaints against the SST's billboard attack ads.

In early May 2025, Parsons welcomed Justice Minister Paul Goldsmith's announcement that the Sixth National Government would reverse the previous Sixth Labour Government's policy of allowing prisoners serving sentences less than three years to vote. Parsons said that prisoners had lost their rights to be a part of "functioning society" due to their crimes and urged the government to extend the ban to those on home detention.

In October 2026, the Sensible Sentencing Trust funded further billboard attack ads targeting Green Party co-leaders Marama Davidson and Chlöe Swarbrick, alongside Labour leader Chris Hipkins. The ad drew ire from the former party, who lodged a complaint with the Advertising Standards authority, on the grounds that it resembled their branding, given that the billboard used their election slogan. As of 27 October 2026, JCDecaux, the owner of the billboard, has paused the ad. Later that day, Parsons confirmed that the Sensible Sentencing Trust had removed images of the three politicians while retaining the message. She disputed the Greens' complaint that the ad could be mistaken for a legitimate political advertisement, saying that it was satire.
