= Garth McVicar =

New Zealand politician (born 1951)

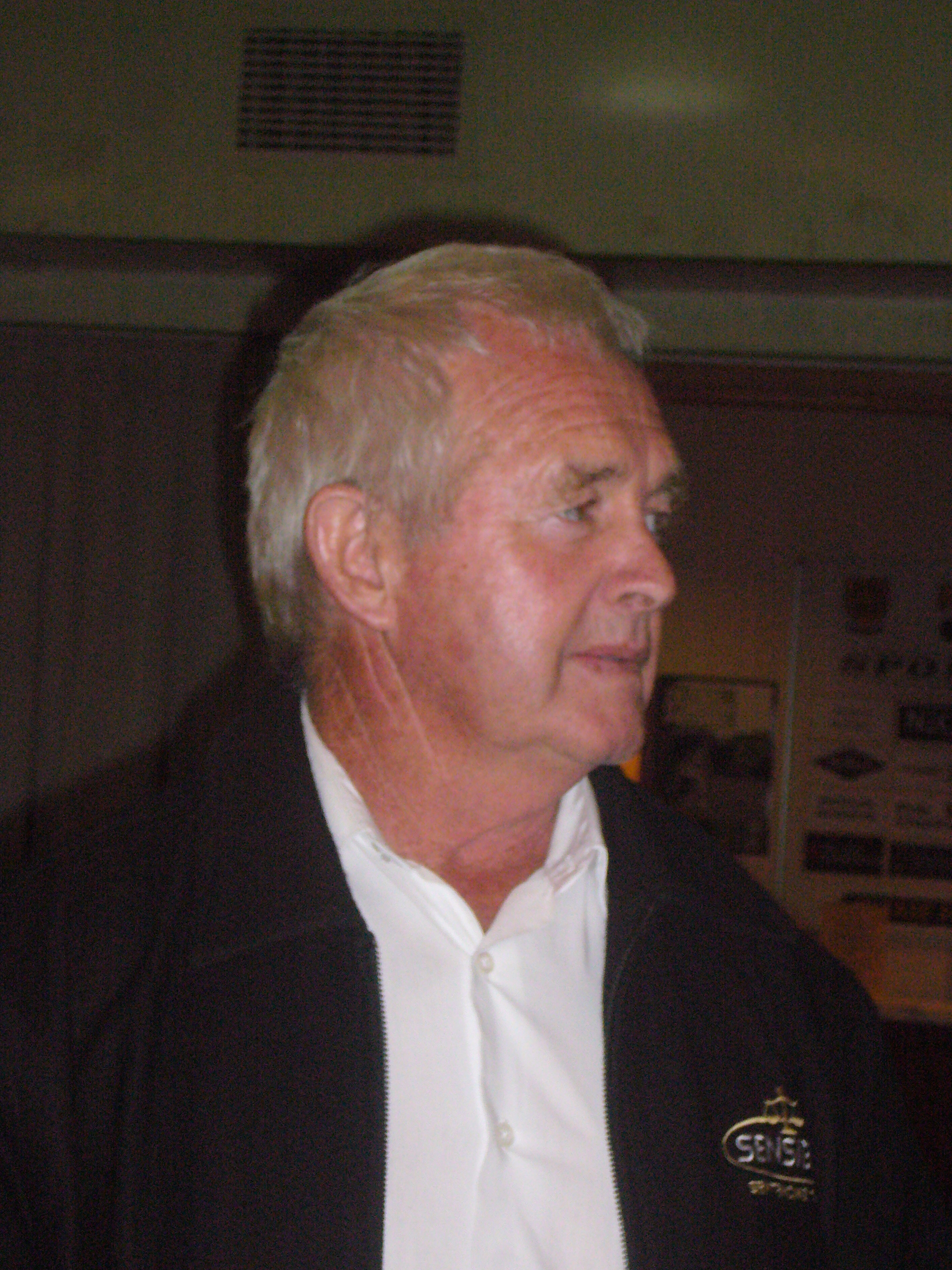
- McVicar in 2013
- Born: 1951 (age 74–75)
- Known for: Founder and former chief executive of the Sensible Sentencing Trust
- Political party: Conservative

Garth Neil McVicar (born 1951) is a New Zealand political lobbyist who founded the Sensible Sentencing Trust (SST) law-and-order advocacy group in 2001. In August 2014, he stood down from SST to focus on a campaign for election to Parliament. McVicar was the candidate for the Conservative Party in the Napier electorate, and ranked third on the party's list, but was unsuccessful.

== Biography ==
McVicar was born in 1951. He and his wife Anne have four adult daughters. The McVicars live with two of their daughters on their family farm near the Mohaka River west of Napier.

He founded the Sensible Sentencing Trust in 2001 in response to the police prosecution of Mark Middleton for threatening to kill Paul Dally who tortured, raped, and killed Middleton's 13-year-old stepdaughter Karla Cardno in 1989.

In 2006 McVicar was ranked 32nd in a New Zealand Listener Power List, a list of 50 influential New Zealand people. In 2014, McVicar was ranked 62nd equal on the Reader's Digest Most Trusted New Zealanders list, ahead of Police Commissioner Mike Bush (79th) but well behind Chief Justice Sian Elias (33rd).

According to Stephen Franks, a former member of parliament for ACT New Zealand, McVicar had been asked to stand for Parliament several times. After weeks of speculation, McVicar announced in August 2014 that he had joined the Conservative Party to contest the 2014 general election. McVicar was 3rd on the party list and was nominated for the Napier electorate. He received 7,135 votes but cut into traditional National Party votes allowing Stuart Nash to win back the seat for Labour. McVicar subsequently announced his departure from the Conservative Party and that he would return to heading the Sensible Sentencing Trust.

On 1 April 2018, Garth McVicar drew controversy when he posted remarks on Facebook lauding the New Zealand Police for killing a man armed with a machete who resisted arrest in the early hours of Easter Sunday. McVicar's remarks drew criticism from various people including prisoner advocates and a police officer, who stated that "shooting a human being is never a time to congratulate anybody." McVicar defended his actions and claimed that he wanted to spark a debate on public discussion of crime.

In December 2018, McVicar apologised on behalf of the Sensible Sentencing Trust after the organisation misidentified a man as a convicted pedophile on their online database, which caused the man considerable stress and duress. The Privacy Commissioner John Edwards publicly criticised the Trust, stating that it had a "continuously negligent, cavalier, and dangerous approach to privacy." McVicar accepted that the organisation had made a mistake and promised to correct the inaccurate information on its database. However, he also criticised Edwards for alleged double standards in singling out the Trust for criticism while not calling for the names of recidivist violent offenders to be placed in a public database.

In December 2018, McVicar stepped down as leader of the Sensible Sentencing Trust. He was succeeded by his youngest daughter Jess McVicar, who became the Trust's National Spokesperson.

== Views ==
McVicar is known as a "hard-line law and order lobbyist". McVicar submitted to Parliament on the Marriage (Definition of Marriage) Amendment Act 2013 that "changing the law would be another erosion of basic morals and values in society that had led to an escalation of child abuse, domestic violence and an ever-increasing prison population." He stated that crime would increase if gays were allowed to marry.
