= Colin Craig =

New Zealand politician

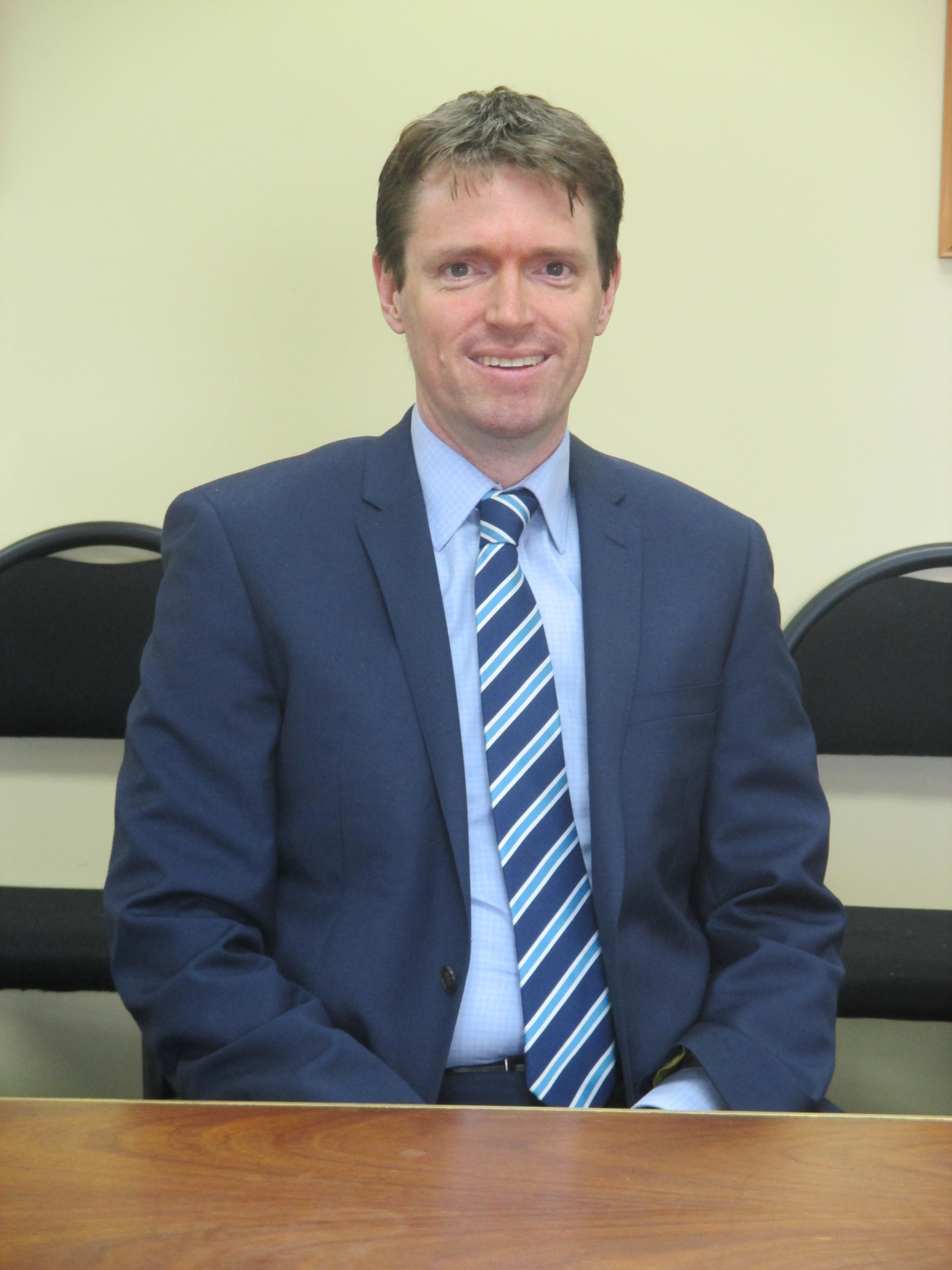
- Craig in 2015

1st Leader of the Conservative Party
- In office 3 August 2011 – June 2015
- Deputy: Christine Rankin
- Succeeded by: Leighton Baker

Personal details
- Born: 8 January 1968 (age 58) Auckland, New Zealand
- Party: Conservative
- Spouse: Helen Craig
- Children: 2
- Occupation: Businessman and politician

Colin Craig (born 8 January 1968) is a New Zealand businessman and perennial candidate who was the founding leader of the Conservative Party of New Zealand.

Craig is a millionaire who owns companies that manage high-rise buildings. His current company manages about $1.3 billion of assets. Upon entering politics in 2011, he opposed same-sex marriage, foreign ownership of land and housing, and "anti-smacking" legislation. On 19 June 2015, Craig resigned as leader of the Conservative Party following allegations of inappropriate behaviour surrounding the party's former press secretary Rachel MacGregor (to which he admitted later at a second press conference on 22 June 2015 with his wife) and tensions with the party's governing board. Craig has since admitted to inappropriate conduct with MacGregor but has denied charges of sexual harassment, a claim being challenged in the courts by several people including Craig himself. On 27 June, Craig was formally suspended from the Conservative Party. Since then, his suspension has been invalidated which would enable Craig to contest the Conservative Party's leadership. On 16 November 2015, Craig announced that he would not be contesting the Conservative Party leadership in lieu of a police investigation against him over his Party's spending during the 2014 general election.

== Personal life ==
Born in Auckland and raised in the suburb of Howick, Craig attended Macleans College and graduated from the University of Auckland with Bachelor of Commerce and Bachelor of Arts degrees before completing post-graduate study at Massey University. He has one daughter with his wife Helen. His father, Ross Craig, served as a Rodney District councillor until 2010.

Craig is a conservative Christian brought up in the Baptist denomination, but does not attend a church. As of June 2014, he is resident in Fairview Heights on Auckland's North Shore.

== Views ==
Craig has stated he is not sure that "legislating morality" works well. However, he has described legalisation of same-sex marriage as "social engineering", and is also opposed to gay adoption, adolescent access to abortion, and voluntary euthanasia or assisted suicide. In May 2012, Craig described New Zealand's young men and women as "the most promiscuous in the world" based upon surveys such as David P. Schmitt's International Sexuality Description Project research statistics and anecdotal evidence from New Zealand gynaecologists, a statement which was dismissed by Prime Minister John Key and other political leaders like Tariana Turia and Winston Peters.

Following a series of child poverty items on current affairs show Campbell Live and a fundraising effort from the show to raise money for school lunches, Craig said children sent to school without lunch should go without. Instead, their parents should be charged the "cost of rectifying their bad behaviour".

In September 2012, Craig had 20,000 leaflets delivered to residents in the Helensville electorate, claiming locals had told him Helensville MP and Prime Minister John Key was "too gay" to be their representative in Parliament.

In April 2013 Craig sided with controversial Danish politician Marie Krarup after she called a traditional Maori greeting "grotesque". Craig said no visitors should have to face a "bare-bottomed native making threatening gestures" if they didn't want to.

Following the legalisation of same sex marriage in April 2013, Craig said "the day of reckoning" would come, that it was a "failure of democracy" and that "[it] was not a vote of the people of New Zealand," adding "If it had been, the answer would have been no."

Craig has been known to take offence at satirical articles directed at him, including a piece on the satirical website The Civilian, which he said published a story designed "to make him look ridiculous". He threatened to sue the site unless they published a retraction and paid him $500. Craig withdrew the threat the following day.

In November 2013 Craig rejected the scientific consensus on climate change by claiming that humans were not to blame for climate change, instead blaming sunspots and "the circulation of planets".

== Political career ==
=== March for Democracy ===
Craig first emerged as a conservative activist in 2009 when he organised and funded a "march for democracy" to protest government decisions not to adhere to three citizen's initiated referendums:

1. the 1999 New Zealand MP reduction referendum, on a proposed reduction in the number of members of parliament (1999 – 81% in favour)
2. the 1999 New Zealand justice referendum, re sundry suggested changes to the justice system (1999 – 92% in favour)
3. the 2009 referendum concerning the repeal of the 2007 amendment of the Crimes Act, the so-called "anti-smacking" law, which removed parental corporal punishment as a defense in criminal assault cases (2009 – 87% in favour).

He spent $450,000 organising the march, and it attracted 5,000 participants. In 2010, Craig contested the Auckland Mayoral election, finishing third with 42,598 votes behind Len Brown, mayor of Manukau City (237,487 votes) and John Banks (New Zealand politician and former mayor of Auckland – 171,542 votes), but ahead of incumbent North Shore City mayor Andrew Williams (3,813 votes).

=== Conservative Party leadership ===
In 2011 Craig announced the formation of the Conservative Party of New Zealand. The party contested the 2011 general election on a variety of issues, including the introduction of binding referendums, reducing the number of members of parliament while increasing the electoral term by one year, law and order reform (including work for prisoners), a repeal of the New Zealand emissions trading scheme, the protection of state assets (notably the foreshore and seabed), and fiscal conservatism. In September 2011, he announced he would stand in the Rodney electorate for the 2011 general election.

After pre-election polling in this electorate, Craig claimed to have 47% support while the National Party candidate Mark Mitchell had 36.3%. Prime Minister and National Party leader John Key said that the Conservative Party faced a "massive hurdle" to get a seat in Parliament. According to preliminary election results, Mitchell won the seat with 52.6% of the vote, and Colin Craig came second with 21.4% of the vote. The Conservative Party also gained 2.76% of the vote nationwide, the fifth-largest share of any party and more than four of the parties that actually won seats, but this was insufficient for any Conservatives to enter Parliament because of the 5% of the party vote or one electorate seat required by the mixed-member proportional voting system operating in New Zealand.

Since the Conservative party's conception, Craig has donated $4 million. He is one of the party's two major donors besides Waikato businessman Laurence Day. Craig stood as a candidate in the East Coast Bays electorate in the 2014 general election but failed to win the electorate. His party received 4.1% of the vote; less than 5% of the voting threshold which denied them a seat in the New Zealand Parliament. On 18 September 2014, the Conservative Party's press secretary Rachel MacGregor resigned, citing his alleged manipulative behaviour. When questioned by the media, Craig denied the allegations and offered to discuss the issue with MacGregor following the 2014 general election.

In February 2014, the-then Green Party co-leader Russel Norman alleged that Colin Craig held misogynistic and homophobic attitudes during a speech at the Big Gay Out event in Auckland. Norman's comments prompted Craig to file a defamation suit and to demand that Norman issue an apology. In response, Norman and the Green Party announced that they would contest the lawsuit. On 10 October 2014, following the 2014 general election, both parties settled the lawsuit out of court and agreed to bear their own legal expenses.

=== 2015 leadership dispute ===
In June 2015, Colin Craig drew criticism from elements of the Conservative Party when he participated in a sauna interview hosted by TV3 reporter David Farrier, which they felt badly reflected on Craig's public image. The interview was part of the television channel's new Sauna Session current affairs series. Following sexual harassment allegations that were published on the right-wing blogger Cameron Slater's blog Whale Oil, Craig resigned as party leader on 19 June 2015 and also agreed to "facilitate a review" of the leadership. Craig was also criticised by elements of the Conservative Party for postponing a leadership vote at a scheduled board meeting that month.

On 20 June 2015, Colin Craig announced that he was not ruling out a return to the Conservative Party's leadership if he found sufficient support from the Party's members. He also threatened to sue several media outlets over allegations that he had paid off his former secretary MacGregor over a complaint of sexual harassment to the New Zealand Human Rights Commission. On 21 June, The New Zealand Herald reported that Craig had settled a "financial dispute" with MacGregor for around NZ$16,000 to $17,000 approximately eight weeks earlier. The television channel One News also reported that there was a serious falling-out between Craig and several Conservative board members. One board member, John Stringer, has accused Craig of lying to the board and other inappropriate behaviour. In response, Craig has denied these allegations and threatened to take action against Stringer for speaking to the media.

During the press conference held on 22 June 2015, Craig admitted that he had acted inappropriately towards his press secretary Rachel MacGregor but denied any charges of sexual harassment. In response, MacGregor accused the former Conservative leader for breaching a confidentiality agreement the pair had reached under Human Rights Commission mediation and disputed his version of the events. Craig's wife Helen Craig also announced that she was standing by her husband and characterised the charges against him as "false allegations." Both Craig and MacGregor have also denied that they were involved in a romantic relationship. Both Craig and MacGregor have also indicated that they would support the lifting of the confidentiality agreement in order to allay uncertainty and speculation.

According to the Herald, several board members of the Conservative Party including John Stringer, Christine Rankin, and Laurence Day have indicated support for a change of leadership. A board meeting was scheduled for 27 June 2015 and Day also called for Craig to be expelled from the party. Following the resignation of six Conservative Party board members, Craig indicated that a new board and a new leader would later be elected by the Party over the weekend. Craig has not ruled out contesting the leadership poll. It is currently unclear whether the dissolution of the board would favor Craig or any other contender for the Conservative Party's leadership.

On 27 June 2015, Colin Craig was formally suspended from the Conservative Party by the party's newly appointed board which consisted of John Stringer and four newly appointed members. Four of the five board members with the exception of Stringer voted to suspend the former Conservative leader's membership. The conference took place in a room at the Heartland Hotel near Auckland International Airport. According to One News, Craig has since challenged the legality of Stringer and the board's actions; claiming that Stringer had been suspended from the Party. He has also not ruled out contesting the Conservative Party's leadership. Craig's remarks were dismissed by Stringer, who became the Party's interim leader.

On 5 July 2015, John Stringer resigned his positions as chairman and board member to preserve the neutrality of the second Board so he and Craig could resolve their differences in court separately. According to the New Zealand Herald, a statement by former chairman Brian Dobbs that Stringer had been suspended meant that the decision by the interim board to suspend Colin Craig's membership was invalid. It transpired that the "suspension" of Stringer was nothing more than a phone call by Dobbs to Nathaniel Heslop (who had already resigned) and Stringer was never notified of any hearing or meeting being the only other board member still active. Dobbs then resigned hours later with Stringer not being notified he was 'suspended" until a week later which was ignored. Documents later emerged that Craig had threatened Dobbs with personal liabilities of the party debts and letters flowed from Craig's lawyers to Dobbs. On 7 July, Craig also sent a personal letter to Conservative Party members to apologize for his behaviour and to gauge whether he had sufficient support to return to the Party's leadership. On 29 July 2015, Colin Craig announced that he was going to sue several opponents including Conservative Party member John Stringer, the right wing blogger Cameron Slater and New Zealand Taxpayers' Union's president Jordan Williams for alleged defamation. In addition, Craig also circulated a booklet, entitled "Dirty Politics and Hidden Agendas", which he claimed outlined a "campaign of defamatory lies" against him. On 2 August 2015, Craig also announced his intention to contest the Auckland mayoral election in 2016.

On 10 August 2015, John Stringer lodged a complaint against Colin Craig with the New Zealand Police, alleging that the later had exceeded his allocated election fund legal limit by NZ$2,000 when contesting the East Coast Bays electorate in 2014. In addition, Stringer criticized Craig's management of the Conservative Party's 2014 election campaign. The following day, Stringer submitted a dossier of documents to both the Police and the Electoral Commission. On 14 August 2015, Jordan Williams served proceedings in defamation against Colin Craig and several Conservative Party officials in response to Craig's statements at the July press conference and in the circular Dirty Politics and Hidden Agendas. On 11 September 2015 Colin Craig filed a defamation suit against the Party's former chairman, John Stringer. Stringer has indicated that he would contest these charges in court.

On 7 November 2015, Colin Craig was outed as the anonymous "Mr X" who posed as a party whistleblower that was interviewed in the "Dirty Politics" booklet delivered earlier in July. Despite acknowledging that he had fabricated the interview by posing as the interviewee, he defended his actions on the grounds that "talking about himself" in the third person was a common literary tool. He also stood by his assertions in the "Dirty Politics" booklet and vowed to continue his involvement in the Conservative Party. On 16 November, Craig announced that he would not contest the Conservative Party's leadership in lieu of a police investigation over his Party's spending during the 2014 general election. However, he also indicated that he would contest the 2017 general elections if he was cleared and if the Party wanted him back. On 24 November, it was reported that Craig had demanded that the blogger Cameron Slater pay him NZ$15,000 as compensation for reproducing a poem written for his former press secretary Rachel MacGregor on his blog Whale Oil.

== Post-leadership ==
On 19 January 2016, Colin Craig donated NZ$36,000 to the Conservative Party. Despite his lack of involvement with the leadership, he stated that he and his wife still wanted to support the Party financially. On 1 March 2016, Stringer subsumed his Christchurch counter-claim suit against the Craigs within new proceedings for defamation against the Craigs in Auckland. Stringer's case was heard in Auckland before Justice Palmer September 2019 (verdict pending) and the older counter-claim was voided by the plaintiff (Stringer). In early April 2016, Craig tabled legal papers seeking more than $NZ13,000 in legal damages from blogger Cameron Slater for publishing his romantic poem The Two of Me relating to the former Conservative press secretary Rachel MacGregor on his blog Whale Oil the previous year.

In April 2016, the High Court ruled that the telecommunications company Vodafone could not disclose private email correspondence between Craig and former party member John Stringer, who welcomed the decision. Craig also agreed to pay Vodafone's legal bills.

=== 2016 Defamation lawsuit ===
On 5 September 2016, Colin Craig appeared in the Auckland High Court to face a defamation lawsuit filed by Taxpayers' Union executive director Jordan Williams. Williams had filed the lawsuit after Craig alleged that Williams lied when he said that Craig had sexually harassed his former press secretary Rachel MacGregor. A jury of seven men and five women were selected for the trial. On 6 September, Williams submitted text message correspondence between Craig and MacGregor as evidence of Craig's alleged sexual harassment. Williams has also alleged that Craig had breached a confidentiality agreement with McGregor.

On 7 September 2016, the former Conservative Party deputy Christine Rankin took the stand to testify in support of Williams' defamation suit. Rankin testified that revelations about Craig's alleged inappropriate relationship with MacGregor had led her to question Craig's suitability to lead the Party. That same day, Williams took the stand to read portions of Craig's poems to MacGregor. He also alleged that Craig's defence team had tried to link him to the Dirty Politics scandal by alleging that he had taken part in a smear campaign against the former head of the Serious Fraud Office. On 8 September, the judge discharged a juror after he revealed that he had a connection to a witness who was scheduled to give evidence for Craig later in the trial. As a result, the trial would proceed with eleven jurors.

On 8 September, Craig's lawyer Stephen Mills QC cross-examined Williams, who admitted that he had never seen the actual "sex text" between Craig and MacGregor. He also presented correspondence between Craig and MacGregor and contended that their relationship was consensual. The following day, Mills continued his cross-examination of Williams and suggested that William's motives for releasing the letters and emails were link to an ulterior motive of removing Craig as Party leader. Williams admitted this was the case but asserted that Craig's alleged inappropriate relationship with MacGregor made him an unsuitable leader for a "Christian movement based on family values."

On 12 September, the former Conservative board member John Stringer alleged that Craig was involved romantically with other women besides Rachel MacGregor. He also denied that there was a "dirty politics" strategy against Craig and alleged that Crag had disciplined, harassed, and attacked members that had disagreed with him. In his testimony, Stringer also alleged that Craig had created a "cult-like culture of confidentiality within the Conservative Party." On 14 and 15 September, Craig's former press secretary Rachel MacGregor took the stand to testify about Craig's alleged sexual harassment during the three-year period she had spent working as his press secretary. In her testimony, MacGregor cited a disagreement about her pay rate as the final straw in her decision to resign as press secretary two days before the 2014 general election. In addition, MacGregor admitted that Craig had once fallen asleep on her lap but denied singing Christian hymns to him during that incident. On 15 September, the former Auckland City councillor Aaron Bhatnagar testified in support of Williams. He dismissed Craig's claim that he had supplied the text correspondence between Craig and MacGregor to Williams as false allegations that had damaged his reputation.

On the afternoon of 15 September, Colin Craig and his lawyer Stephen Mills began presenting evidence for his defence after Jordan Williams and his team concluded their evidence. On 16 September, Craig denied William's allegations that he had sexually harassed MacGregor and likened their relationship to that of siblings. Craig also testified that MacGregor had proposed to marry him but that he had turned her offer down because he was already married. In his testimony, he argued that his rejection of MacGregor's proposition had led her to resign as press secretary.

On 19 September, Craig denied sending any sex text messages to Rachel McGregor but during cross-examination was unable to provide evidence supporting his claim. While hundreds of text messages from MacGregor's phone had been submitted as evidence, Craig's complete phone records have not been supplied to the court. The following day, Craig denied that he charged a 29.5% interest rate on MacGregor's loan in order to coerce her into dropping her sexual harassment claim against him. He maintained that he had imposed the interest rate after she had resigned because she had defaulted on a $19,000 loan.

On 20 September, Craig's wife Helen Craig testified that MacGregor had privately called her to confess that she was having an emotional relationship with Craig. She added that MacGregor had admitted kissing Craig on the night of the 2011 general election. Helen also confirmed that she had forgiven her husband. Helen also testified that she and Craig had drawn up a set of " working rules" to govern his working relationship. While Craig had admitted kissing McGregor, he denied undressing or having sexual intercourse with her.

On 21 September, the investigative journalist Nicky Hager testified as part of Colin Craig's defense. In his testimony, he alleged that the information that had been released about Colin Craig on blogs like Cameron Slater's Whale Oil matched the patterns he had documented in his book Dirty Politics, which had inspired Craig's pamphlet "Dirty Politics and Hidden Agendas". Brian Dobbs, the former chairman of the Conservative Party, also testified that he and several other board members had expressed their discomfort with Craig and MacGregor's relationship. He criticized Craig for proceeding with the a 2015 sauna interview with a journalist without consulting him first. Dobbs also disclosed that Williams had shown him a collection of love letters, poems, emails, and other correspondence between Craig and MacGregor in June 2015.

On 22 September, former Conservative Party board member Laurence Day disputed Rachel MacGregor's claim that Colin Craig had sexually harassed her on the grounds that Williams had failed to present the incriminating alleged "sext" text message. He alleged that Williams was trying to use the sexual harassment allegations to turn the party board members against Craig. Meanwhile, Family First director Bob McCoskrie described Williams' leak of the alleged sexual harassment allegations as part of an "organized campaign" to unseat Craig. Day and McCoskrie supported Craig's assertion that his relationship with MacGregor had been inappropriate but consensual. McCoskrie defended Craig's pamphlet as a response to the alleged "organized campaign" against Craig.

On 23 September, several Conservative Party staff members testified in Craig's defense. Two staffers Bev Adair-Beets and Angela Storr alleged that MacGregor had tried to exploit her relationship with Craig and disputed her sexual harassment allegations. Another staffer Kevin Stitt vouched for the accuracy of the allegations presented in Craig's "Dirty Politics" pamphlet. The left-wing blogger Martyn Bradbury also alleged that Williams had embarked on what he described as a "political hit" job against the former Conservative leader. While on the stand, the plaintiff Williams disputed Craig's defense lawyer Stephen Mill's charge that he had used MacGregor for political gain.

On 28 September, lawyers for both Jordan Williams and Colin Craig entered closing arguments. William's lawyer Peter Knight argued that the love letters and poems were proof that Williams had not been lying about Craig's alleged sexual harassment against MacGregor. In response, Craig's lawyer Stephen Mills asserted Craig had a right to defend himself through his "Dirty Politics" pamphlet. Mills also contended that Williams had broken MacGregor's trust by passing information on her relationship with Craig to other Conservative Party officials and Cameron Slater's blog Whale Oil.

On 30 September, after ten hours of deliberations, the jury unanimously found Craig guilty on two counts of defamation against Williams. Craig was ordered to pay $1.3 million in compensation and punitive damages to Williams. While Williams and his supporters including Cameron Slater have welcomed the decision, Craig's lawyers have announced that they would be appealing the verdict and challenging the size of the damages awarded.

=== Historic defamation damages award v Craig appealed ===
On 12 April 2017, High Court Justice Katz ruled that the compensation damages of $1.27 million constituted a "miscarriage of justice". The decision was welcomed by Colin Craig as a vindication of his assertion that he was responding to attacks on his character by Jordan Williams. However the judge's decision related only to the amount of damages awarded to Williams against Craig by the jury not their verdict that Williams had been defamed by Craig which stood. Justice Katz indicated that the two parties had until 26 April 2017 to consent to the High Court substituting its own award or setting aside the earlier verdict and ordering a retrial. Mr Williams filed an appeal of the Katz decision.

Colin Craig did not file an acceptance of this action by 26 April, actioning an inevitable re-trial. However, Jordan Williams then filed an appeal of the judge's decision seeking the jury damages award in his favour stand. He released a press statement late April saying "Colin Craig argued that the jury's damages award was too high. The judge agreed but the High Court is only able to reset the damages if both parties agree...I don't want Rachel MacGregor or my mother or any other of my witnesses to have to go through it all again. The jury made clear findings. At every stage Mr Craig has wanted to stretch things out. We have no assurance he would not appeal after a new trial...So an appeal now could get to the key issues directly. It is the best way forward."

=== Human Rights Review Tribunal record damages awarded against Craig ===
On 3 October, it was reported that the Human Rights Review Tribunal had, earlier in 2016, ordered Craig to pay Rachel MacGregor $128,780 in compensation for breaching the non-disclosure agreement with MacGregor by giving interviews about her. Because of the Williams defamation trial, the decision had been covered by blanket suppression until after the Williams v Craig verdict.

As of 2016, this amounts to the highest amount awarded by the Human Rights Review Tribunal. In addition, Craig paid MacGregor $100,000 relating to her legal costs.

=== Subsequent developments ===
On 4 October, the Conservative Party's board chairman Leighton Baker (confirmed as new leader of the party on 24 January 2017) confirmed that Colin Craig had resigned his membership and was not holding any positions in the party. However, Craig has not ruled out playing a role with the Conservatives after his legal problems were resolved. On 6 December 2016, Craig won his bid for his upcoming defamation case against former Party official John Stringer to be heard before a judge rather than a jury as with the Williams case which Craig lost with historic damages. The Craig v Stringer case had been scheduled to be heard in the Christchurch High Court before Justice Gendall for a three-week period on 6 March 2017 (Craig v Stringer). In late 2016 John Stringer succeeded before Justice Nation in having granted an application for a Judicial Settlement Conference under r7:79 in Christchurch. On 30 January 2017 Craig and Stringer settled their differences and the case against Stringer was dropped. No money exchanged hands and the settlement was sealed by the court and will not be released.

On 6 December 2016, Judge Mary-Beth Sharp of the Auckland District Court dismissed both of Craig's copyright lawsuits against Cameron Slater and Jordan Williams over the publication of Craig's poem Two of Me calling the claims "vexatious" and "improper" and a "deception perpetrated on the court". On 6 April 2017, Colin Craig filed a $240,000 lawsuit against former employee Jacqueline Stiekema regarding defamatory statements she had allegedly made on a Facebook page and other defamatory publications she had made to a third person. On 29 March 2017 Associate Judge Bell transferred the application to strike out the case to the district court.

=== 2017 defamation trials ===
Craig and blogger Cameron Slater both sued each other for defamation following the 2014 election. The cases were held in May 2017 and Craig represented himself in the four week trial. The Judge reserved his decision.

8 May - 1 June 2017 the Craig v Slater (and Slater v Craig counterclaim) CIV2015-404-1923 was heard in the Auckland High Court before Justice Toogood. Slater was represented by Brian Henry and Craig represented himself. The trial went a week past its scheduled three weeks. Craig said the case came down to credibility and whom the judge believed was telling the truth. Slater sued Craig for alleged defamatory statements in his booklet "Dirty Politics & Hidden Agendas" (2015) and Craig sued Slater for making alleged defamatory statements on his blog. These included that Craig: had sexually harassed Rachel MacGregor; lied about it; and covered it up after settling a sexual harassment hearing in the Human Rights Commission and then the Human Rights Review Tribunal; and that there was a "second woman".

It transpired during the trial that Slater had been rung by a barrister that he knew (and whose identity vocation and area of practice he had chosen to keep anonymous) was in fact working for Colin Craig. There was disagreement over phone calls on 24 and 25 June 2015 initiated by the barrister and allegedly by Mr Craig which left Slater with an inference the barrister (a sexual harassment specialist) was representing a "second victim" with whom "Craig was a factor". However, neither the barrister nor Craig ever revealed the conflict of interest nor did Craig correct Slater's inference at any stage leading up to and during most of the trial (the "second woman" was a central factor in both the earlier Craig v Stringer and Williams v Craig proceedings based on that evidence). Craig instead chose to sue all three parties for this contention which he knew was false yet allowed Slater to infer without correction until the much later trial.

The judge reserved his decision on 1 June 2017 to be delivered "as quickly as possible."

The Slater trial was the second in a triumvirate of trials central to a cluster of ancillary proceedings involving Craig (in the District Court; in hearings; in tribunals; and with the police; the Privacy Commission and the Electoral Commission all based on independent complaints). The main three trials (all filed 2015) concern the so-called "Dirty Politics Brigade" (Jordan Williams; Cameron Slater; John Stringer) alleged in the Craig's booklet "Dirty Politics & Hidden Agendas (2015) named after the Hager book "Dirty Politics" (2014). The Williams trial concluded 30 September 2016; the Slater-Craig trials 1 June 2017; and Stringer v Craig & Others CIV2015-404-2524 is anticipated later in 2017 which will be the largest of the three. The latter has six defendants including Helen Craig but one of the defendants (a lawyer) settled with John Stringer in May 2016. Stringer and Craig also settled "Craig v Stringer" (CIV2015-409-0575) on 30 January 2017 in the Christchurch high court for zero an unrelated but parallel proceeding to the three main trials which largely concern the same issues and the same people.

On 9 June, it was reported that Colin Craig had filed a lawsuit against his former press secretary Rachel MacGregor. He was criticized by MacGregor, her advocate Ruth Money, and Jordan Williams for abusing the legal process. On 20 June, MacGregor filed a counter-suit against her former employer for defamation. On 31 July, Judge Garry Harrison dismissed Craig's lawsuit against the former employee Jacky Stiekema, who had previously worked as a trust accounts manager for his company Centurion Management.

=== Second strike-out of Craig suit 1 September 2017 ===
On Friday 1 September 2017 Judge Harrison delivered a second strike-out of a Craig defamation suit.

In the judges' four page decision Craig was ordered to pay Mrs Jacky Stiekema [Craig v Stiekema Civ2915-404-002882] $17600 in costs following his earlier refusal to discontinue what was described as frivolous litigation [para 12 of the decision] against her by senior barrister Peter McKnight of Wellington firm Langford Law. In the Stiekema case it was concluded Craig sought to obtain emails (that did not exist) between John Stringer (see above) and Mrs Stiekema for ulterior purposes (so Craig could use any material discovered against Stringer elsewhere); ruled a "fishing expedition" in relation to Craig by Associate Judge Osborne in the Christchurch High Court in yet another Craig proceeding.

The Judge Harrison decision followed an earlier decision by Judge Sharp at the Auckland District Court in December 2016 to strike-out Craig's litigation Craig v Social Media Ltd and Jordan Williams described as "vexatious," "malicious" and "a deception on the court." In both instances Craig is appealing the judgements.

Jacky Stiekema (described in blog posts by Stringer as "Grandma Quilts" to protect her privacy) had previously worked as a senior trust account manager at Craig's Centurion company. In 2012, Stiekema had successfully taken Craig to the Employment Court for which she was awarded several thousand dollars. It was felt in some quarters that perhaps the more recent litigation was in retaliation for this as it appeared difficult to ascertain Craig's motivation for suing Stiekema and that he had failed "to disclose a serious tort". At the time of Stiekema's 2012 Employment Court hearing, it was reported that Craig had made remarks claiming that "shortness" was the result of sin; an allusion to the Biblical character Zaccheus the tax collector. Stiekema also objected at being forced to attend "prayer meetings" run by Craig at the business despite Stiekema's strong personal Christian faith.

=== New litigation, 2017–2019 ===
In late 2017 Craig was facing additional strike-out applications including a recall and possible strikeout of his Christchurch high court case against John Stringer (mid-October 2017; that was settled by Stringer in January 2017 for zero), still to be heard. He is involved in multiple proceedings including a new suit announced against his former sexual harassment complainant Rachel MacGregor and a counter suit from her against Craig.

On 24 September 2018, Craig dropped his damages claim against MacGregor but stated that he was still pursuing his defamation claim against his former press secretary. MacGregor has also pursued a defamation claim against her former employer. On 25 October, Auckland High Court Judge Kit Toogood ruled that Craig had committed "moderately serious sexual harassment" against MacGregor. He also ruled that Cameron Slater had defamed Craig in five untrue statements but declined to award damages, stating that "the reputational damage which Mr Craig suffered throughout the events traversed at length in this judgment resulted almost entirely from his own actions."

In mid September 2015, Stringer filed a lawsuit against Craig and others, claiming Colin and Helen Craig's 2015 booklet Dirty Politics and Hidden Agendas was defamatory of him. The case was heard before Justice Palmer in September 2019 (verdict pending). Earlier in 2019, the same Justice, the son of Sir Geoffrey Palmer, threw Craig's Christchurch high court case against Stringer (also for defamation) out of court. This is being appealed by Craig in Auckland and was heard 11–12 March 2020 before the Appeals' Court. Justice Palmer described it as "unjust" and "an abuse" against Stringer, and ruled it not be allowed to continue, "Mr Craig’s defamation proceeding against Mr Stringer is stayed" [67b].

Several Craig appeals are pending and the verdict for defamation in (2015) Stringer v Craig and Others (a repeat of the parallel Williams and Slater trials over the "Dirty Politics" booklet) is imminent from Justice M. Palmer (as at 12 March 2020).

=== 2020s litigation ===
The verdict in the Stringer v Craig & Others 2015 litigation (heard Sept 2019) was delivered by Justice Palmer, 3 April 2020 [Civ2015-4042524 [2020] NZHC 644].

The court delivered a verdict identical to the Craig v Slater trial regarding defamation in the booklet “Dirty Politics & Hidden Agendas.” In the Stringer verdict, the judge ruled Mr Stringer had been defamed multiple times by C. and H. Craig, as well as by party officials/members A. Storr, K. Stitt and S. Taylor, but that they were all covered by a qualified privilege defence, and the case was therefore dismissed. No damages or costs were awarded in the verdict.

The court also ruled, that (a) Mr Stringer was a member of the “Dirty Politics Brigade” but “(d) to elevate that to a conspiracy requires hard facts, not inferences, and Mr Craig’s case for Mr Stringer’s collusion with Whale Oil is a mirage.”

On 16 November 2021, Craig was ordered by the Auckland High Court to pay NZ$400,000 to former press secretary Rachel MacGregor for claiming that he did not sexually harass her prior to the 2014 general election. The two had been in litigation since 2018. Craig had previously lost a High Court case against MacGregor in 2019. Craig had appealed the 2019 decision to the Court of Appeal and Supreme Court, which upheld the High Court's decision.
