= Secrets and Lies (book) =

1999 book by Nicky Hager and Bob Burton

- Author: Nicky Hager and Bob Burton
- Language: English
- Genre: Public relations; Environmentalism
- Publisher: Craig Potton Publishing
- Publication date: 1999
- Pages: 286pp (paperback)
- ISBN: 0-908802-57-9
- OCLC: 45726973

Secrets and Lies: The Anatomy of an Anti-Environmental PR Campaign is a 1999 book by Nicky Hager and Bob Burton.

== The book ==
The book documents the public relations information put out by Timberlands West Coast Limited in order to win public support for logging of native forests on the West Coast of New Zealand.

The material is based on a large amount of documentation leaked by a staff member from the local branch of Shandwick (now Weber Shandwick Worldwide), a global public relations company, which had been hired by Timberlands to run a secret campaign against environmental groups such as Native Forest Action between 1997 and 1999.

The book describes its tactics of surveillance of meetings, monitoring the press and responding to every letter to the editor, greenwashing, the use of SLAPPs, cleaning anti-logging graffiti and blotting out campaign posters in public places, and managing to install its pro-logging educational materials into schools.

The book alleges that almost every pro-logging letter or article was organized by this campaign.

== Reception and responses ==
In 2000, a press council complaint was made against a letter to the editor in The Press, which argued that Hager had lied in the book. The complaint was not upheld, because the Press Council ruled that it was responsible for vetting robust debate in the letter pages.

During a general Parliamentary debate in November 2006, when the book The Hollow Men had an injunction against its publication, the MP Gerry Brownlee said of the author and the book:

This is the same Nicky Hager who wrote the book [Secrets and Lies] in 1999, in which he spoke about the Timberlands scandal. None of it was true. Not one of the pages in that book carried a single truth. It was roundly discredited. He is a man who indulges in intrigue and in the activities of scurrilously besmirching any individual he does not like, without any care whatsoever.

The Hollow Men documents behind the scenes activities of the National Party, of which Brownlee was deputy leader at the time.

In 2009, Kerry Tankard looked back at the book in a review for Salient. She concluded that: "As a study of how PR firms help corporations to spin and manipulate public opinion, I’ve seen none better."
