= Dirty Work (Hager book) =

2026 book by Nicky Hager

Dirty Work: The Taxpayers' Union and New Zealand's Hard Right
- Author: Nicky Hager
- Language: English
- Subject: Politics
- Publisher: Potton & Burton
- Publication date: 22 September 2026
- Publication place: New Zealand
- Media type: Paperback
- ISBN: 9781988550916
- OCLC: 1617460887
- Preceded by: Dirty Politics

Dirty Work: The Taxpayers' Union and New Zealand's Hard Right is a book by Nicky Hager published in September 2026 and promoted as "Part Three of the Dirty Politics trilogy", following on from 2006's The Hollow Men and 2014's Dirty Politics.

The book was described by Hager as an "exposé" on New Zealand's "radical right", with a focus on the New Zealand Taxpayers' Union (TPU), its co-founders Jordan Williams and David Farrar, and other right-wing lobby groups including Don Brash's Hobson's Pledge. It alleges that the TPU used race baiting and stirred up anti-Māori sentiment to shift the 2023 general election to the right.

== Background ==
Hager says he had never intended to write a follow-up to 2014's Dirty Politics, and initially had not been working on a book about the TPU prior to the 2023 general election.

In July 2023, the TPU issued a statement alleging Hager was working on a book about the organisation; Hager publicly rejected the allegation at the time, telling The Spinoff that the TPU were "jumping at shadows". Following his statement, Hager says he was contacted "within 24 hours" by his first source, and was contacted subsequently by further sources, including former TPU staff, and members of the National Party.

Unlike his previous investigations, which were largely based off documents leaked to Hager, Dirty Work instead relied largely upon interviews with inside sources and associates of the TPU.

== Release ==
Hager at the book's launch at Unity Books, Wellington

The book was released at Unity Books in Wellington on 22 September 2026, with hundreds in attendance.

The book was first announced on 18 September 2026, when invitations to the launch event were sent to journalists by the publisher. Details on the book – including its title and subject matter – were kept secret prior to the launch, leading to public speculation; The Post—upon being leaked the book's title—speculated it would be a follow up to 2014's Dirty Politics, while on X, the TPU's Jordan Williams shared that "Rumour has it Nicky Hager’s new book may feature the Taxpayers’ Union".

== Reception ==
Outgoing National Party Member of Parliament Chris Penk criticised Dirty Work as one-sided polemic, opining without having read it that it "belongs in the fiction section." Penk also defended the public advocacy work of the Taxpayers' Union as a sign of its effectiveness.
