= Nicky Hager =

Author and investigative journalist

Nicky Hager ONZM
- Hager in 2026
- Born: Nicolas Alfred Hager; 1958 (age 67–68); Levin, New Zealand
- Education: Victoria University of Wellington
- Occupation: Investigative journalist
- Children: 1
- Website: www.nickyhager.org

Nicolas Alfred Hager ONZM (born 1958) is a New Zealand investigative journalist. He has produced eight books since 1996, covering topics such as intelligence networks, environmental issues and politics. He is one of two New Zealand members of the International Consortium of Investigative Journalists.

== Early life ==
Hager was born in Levin to a middle-class "socially aware" family. His father was from Vienna, Austria, a Jewish clothing manufacturer who emigrated to New Zealand as a refugee from the Nazis. His mother was born in Zanzibar (part of Tanzania), where her father studied tropical medicine, and later grew up in Kenya and Uganda. His surname Hager is pronounced Har-gar, rhyming with lager.

Hager studied physics at Victoria University of Wellington, where he also did an honours degree in philosophy. He stood as a Values Party candidate for Pahiatua in the 1978 general election.

== Early career ==
After graduating from university, Hager worked at the ecology division of the Department of Scientific and Industrial Research (DSIR), and later worked with his brother-in-law building and renovating houses.

== Journalism career ==
Hager is an investigative journalist who has written eight books. As of July 2019, the International Consortium of Investigative Journalists (ICIJ), an international network that has 249 investigative reporters in over 90 countries, has Hager as one of only two New Zealand members.

Hager works on a number of projects at any given time, gathering information about them and looks for sources and mentors. Some projects "come together" but others can continue for a number of years.

=== Secret Power ===
Secret Power: New Zealand's Role in the International Spy Network, published in 1996, was Hager's first book.

The book investigates various spying techniques, including signals intelligence (Sigint), a form of electronic eavesdropping between countries. The information was taken from interviews with staff in New Zealand's Sigint agency, the Government Communications Security Bureau (GCSB), who revealed the workings of the agency in minute detail: the intelligence targets, equipment, operating procedures, security systems and training, as well as the staff and layout of the intelligence agency's facilities. The book makes special mention of GCSB's facilities at Waihopai and Tangimoana.

It revealed aspects of New Zealand's participation in the UKUSA Agreement facilitating intelligence gathering and sharing between the United States, United Kingdom, Canada, Australia and New Zealand. Since the Edward Snowden revelations, this partnership has become more commonly known as the Five Eyes.

As a result, the insights into the inner workings of the GCSB provide information about the allied agencies as well. In particular, Hager documented the US-coordinated ECHELON system, through which the five agencies intercept and process huge volumes of international e-mail, fax and telephone communications. Hager was one of the earliest to write about the secretive ECHELON worldwide electronic spy network. As a result of his book, in 2001 he testified before the European Parliament on his research into the network.

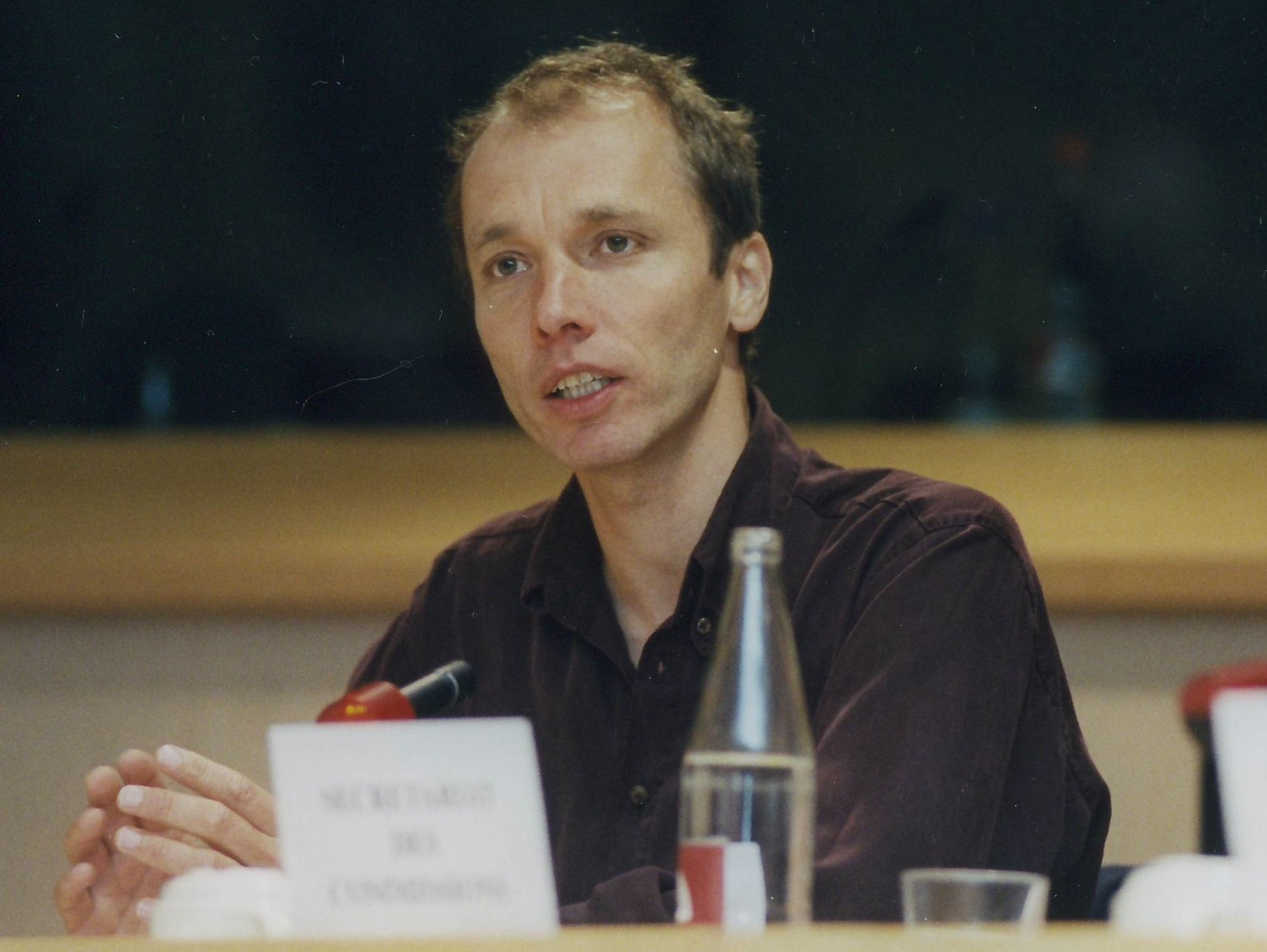
Nicky Hager speaking to the European Parliament's Echelon Committee in April 2001

The book contained two forewords, one written by former New Zealand Prime Minister David Lange and one by Jeffrey T. Richelson, a leading author on U.S. intelligence agencies and the author of the books America's Secret Eyes in the Sky and The Ties That Bind.

=== Secrets and Lies ===
Secrets and Lies: The Anatomy of an Anti-Environmental PR Campaign was co-authored with Bob Burton and published in 1999. It documents the public relations information put out by Timberlands West Coast Limited in order to win public support for logging of native forests on the West Coast of New Zealand.

The material is based on a large amount of documentation leaked by a staff member from the local branch of Shandwick (now Weber Shandwick Worldwide), a global public relations company, which had been hired by Timberlands to run a secret campaign against environmental groups such as Native Forest Action between 1997 and 1999.

The book describes its tactics of surveillance of meetings, monitoring the press and responding to every letter to the editor, greenwashing, the use of strategic lawsuit against public participation (SLAPPs), cleaning anti-logging graffiti and blotting out campaign posters in public places, and managing to install its pro-logging educational materials into schools.

The year after the book's publication, the new Labour government passed the Forests (West Coast Accord) Act 2000, which halted the logging of publicly owned native forests and provided a $120 million transition package for the West Coast economy.

=== Seeds of Distrust ===
Seeds of Distrust: The Story of a GE Cover-up was a study of government processes and decision-making under New Zealand's Labour-led government.

The book details an incident in November 2000, during the Royal Commission on Genetic Modification, when government officials were alerted to evidence of an accidental release of genetically modified corn plants, which was illegal under New Zealand law. The book traces the stages of industry lobbying and government decision making leading up to a decision to regard the incident as insignificant and keep it secret from the public.

The book was released in July 2002, just as a snap election was called, and helped make genetically modified organisms a major election issue.

At a media conference of government officials convened immediately after the book's release, the Chief Executive of the New Zealand Ministry for the Environment, Barry Carbon, conceded that the book was largely accurate but disputed the interpretation of the material.

The Christchurch newspaper The Press studied the official documents and concluded:

"So who's telling the truth, Hager or the Government? Officials at a special briefing for journalists last week memorably commented that they did not disagree with most of Hager's facts, just his conclusions. That is unsurprising, given that the conclusions that can be drawn are not palatable ones. The documents raise some serious questions about the level of open government New Zealand really has and the strength of our much-vaunted biosecurity regime."

=== The Hollow Men ===
In November 2006 Hager's book The Hollow Men: A Study in the Politics of Deception was published. The book details a wide range of National Party internal party documents including emails which were leaked by six National Party insiders. The documents were written by the party leader Don Brash and a wide range of people associated with him.

The origin of the book was the exposing of Plymouth Brethren Christian Church secret funding of National Party election advertising during the 2005 general election. It describes the National Party strategy discussions and the techniques the party advisors used to try to win the 2005 national elections. The thinking behind major speeches, media management, election advertising and election messages is shown in the participants' own words. Many of the party's previously anonymous major donors are identified and relations with them are documented.

The book was initially prevented from being published when Brash obtained an injunction preventing anyone from publishing material from emails that had been stolen from him. At the time Brash was unaware that Hager had completed and was about to launch his book. However, on 23 November 2006, Brash announced his resignation from the leadership of the National Party. The following day he had the injunction lifted, allowing the book to be released.

The Hollow Men was made into a theatrical piece by playwright Dean Parker. Hager assisted with the feature-length documentary of the book, made by Alister Barry, that was released in July 2008.

=== Other People's Wars ===
In August 2011 Hager published Other People's Wars, an investigation into New Zealand's role in the war on terror. Using leaked military information, Hager highlights the difference between what New Zealand was told about its role in Afghanistan and Iraq, and what the leaked documents show. The book demonstrates the role of public relations in blurring the lines between the idea of military as a public service and the agendas that the New Zealand Defence Force was orchestrating for foreign interests. Hager concludes that New Zealand needs greater accountability and neutrality in its armed forces.

It was recognised internationally, with investigative journalist Seymour Hersh stating in a review, "Nicky Hager has more knowledge and understanding of the American intelligence world in Afghanistan – both its good and its very bad points – than any reporter I know." Other People’s Wars was also adapted into a play by Dean Parker in 2012. In late November 2022, the New Zealand Security Intelligence Service (NZSIS) apologised to Hager and paid NZ$66,400 in compensation and legal fees after it illegally accessed his phone records in 2012. The spy agency believed that a member of the Defence Force had illegally provided Hager with information for his book Other People's War. The NZSIS had seized two months' worth of his home phone's metadata in an attempt to track down the NZDF member. Ultimately, the phone data found no link between Hager and the suspected NZDF member. In August 2019, the acting Inspector-General of Intelligence and Security found that the spy agency had no reasonable grounds for suspecting espionage and had failed to exercise caution when investigating Hager's source.

=== Dirty Politics ===
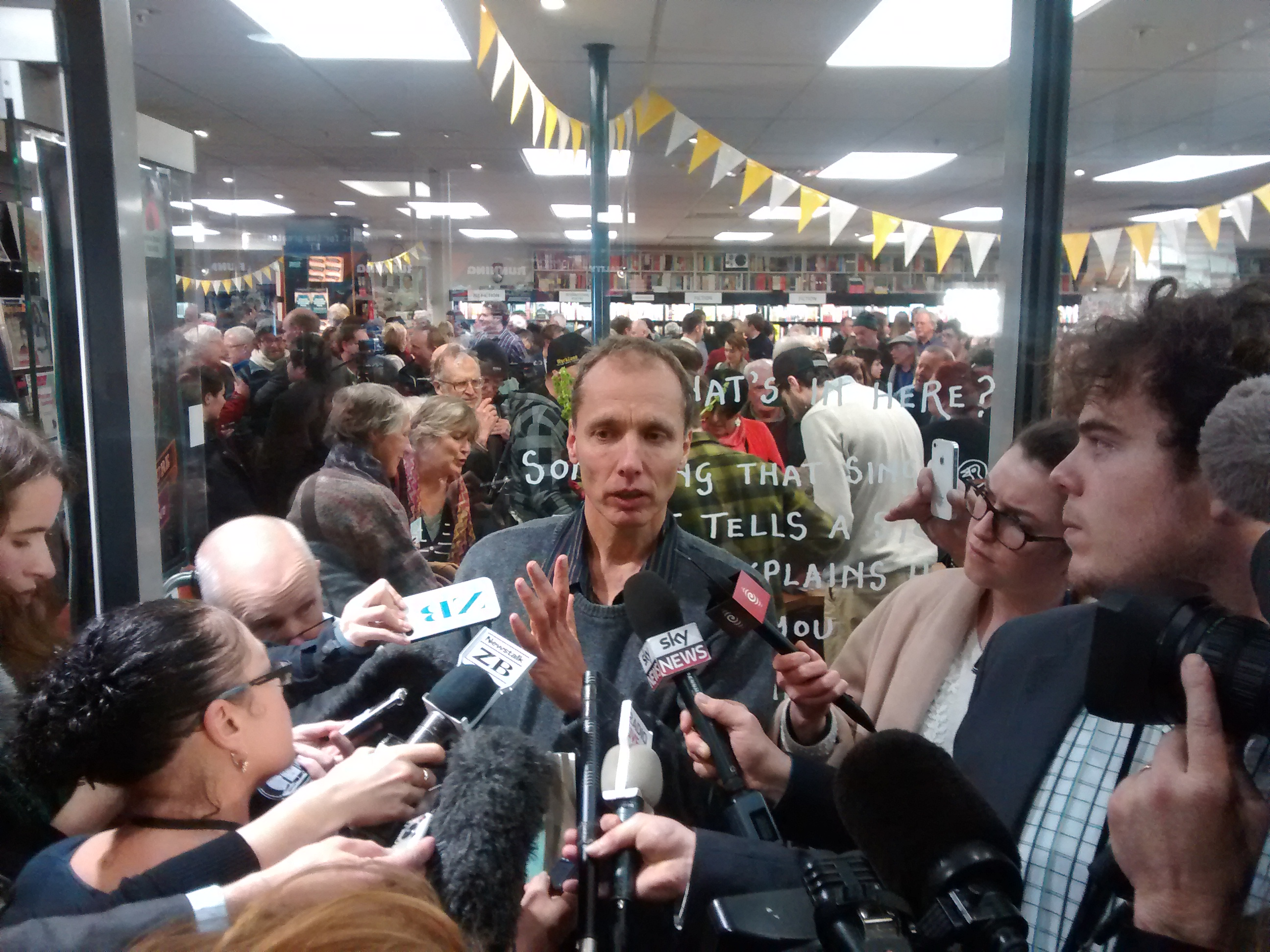
Hager speaking to journalists outside the launch of Dirty Politics

In August 2014, Hager published Dirty Politics: How attack politics is poisoning New Zealand’s political environment, featuring leaked emails between National Party figures and right-wing bloggers. According to Hager the book aims to tell the story of "how attack politics is poisoning NZ's political environment".

Among the claims in the book are that during the 2011 election campaign a right-wing blogger, Cameron Slater, who is the son of former National Party President John Slater, obtained a database of Labour Party members, emails and donations which were used to attack the Labour Party. Also in 2011 the PM's office used its knowledge of secret SIS documents to tip off a right-wing blogger and arrange an attack on Labour leader Phil Goff, and drafted Official Information Act requests for a right-wing blogger to use in other attacks.

In mid-June 2018, Hager accepted an apology and compensation for "substantial damages" from the New Zealand Police for raiding his home in 2014 as part of their investigation into the hacking that led to the Dirty Politics book. The Police also acknowledged accessing his financial records as part of the apology settlement.

=== Jordan Williams' lawsuit against Colin Craig ===
On 21 September 2016, Nicky Hager was subpoenaed by Colin Craig's lawyers to testify as part of the latter's defence in a defamation suit filed by Jordan Williams, the co-founder of the New Zealand Taxpayers' Union. Hager had initially volunteered to give evidence, however decided he did not want to after Mr Williams gave evidence in relation to Craig's treatment of his former press secretary, Rachel MacGregor. Craig gave evidence that he had read Hager's book Dirty Politics before producing his pamphlet Dirty Politics and Hidden Agendas, which was found to have defamed Williams. Hager took the stand as an expert witness and alleged that publications linked to Jordan Williams on Cameron Slater's blog attacked Craig and followed a similar pattern that had been documented in his book. After testifying for fifteen minutes, Hager was not cross-examined by Williams' lawyers and was allowed to leave by the judge.

=== Hit & Run ===
In March 2017, Hager and fellow journalist Jon Stephenson published Hit & Run: The New Zealand SAS in Afghanistan and the meaning of honour. The book explored the New Zealand Special Air Service's involvement in Operation Burnham, a retaliatory military raid on two Afghan villages, Naik and Khak Khuday Dad, in Afghanistan's Tirgiran Valley in August 2010. The NZSAS soldiers had attacked a village while pursuing Taliban fighters following the death of a New Zealand soldier in a roadside bomb. According to Hager and Stephenson, none of the fighters were found but 15 civilians were wounded and six killed. The authors asserted that the NZSAS actions could be considered war crimes and alleged a cover up by the New Zealand Defence Force.

The New Zealand Defence Force Chief Lieutenant-General Tim Keating challenged the book's accuracy and denied that NZ forces had operated in the Naik and Khak Khuday Dad villages. He asserted that the raid had taken place at the nearby "Tirgiran Valley village" and that the raid was carried out to protect New Zealand's Provincial Reconstruction Team in neighbouring Bamiyan Province. In response, the Tirgiran Valley villagers' lawyers including Richard McLeod responded that "Tirgiran Valley village" did not exist and challenged Keating's assertions. Hager and Stephenson acknowledged getting the exact location of the villages wrong but asserted that other information including the villages' names were correct. In late March 2017, the Tirgiran Valley villagers' lawyers McLeod, Rodney Harrison, and Deborah Manning requested that the New Zealand Government undertake a formal inquiry into the events at Naik and Khak Khuday Dad villages.

Hager and Stephenson's book attracted considerable media coverage and commentary in New Zealand. University of Otago law professor Andrew Geddis opined that Operation Burnham damaged the NZDF's trust and credibility. Left-wing blogger Martyn Bradbury supported Hager and Stephenson's assertions that New Zealand forces had committed war crimes. The conservative blogger Matthew Hooton, Amnesty International New Zealand's Executive Director Grant Bayldon, and Fairfax political editor Tracey Watkins supported calls for an independent inquiry into New Zealand war crimes. The-then Prime Minister Bill English rejected calls for an inquiry into NZSAS actions on the grounds of inaccuracies in Hit & Run. In August 2017, the Afghan villagers' three lawyers took the New Zealand Government to court over its refusal to hold an inquiry into Operation Burnham.

Following the formation of a new Labour-New Zealand First-Greens coalition government after the 2017 general election, Prime Minister Jacinda Ardern and Defence Minister Ron Mark announced in early November that they would hold an inquiry into the allegations raised by Hit & Run. On 13 March 2018, the New Zealand Defence Force confirmed that the location of an Afghan village mentioned in the book Hit & Run was the same place where the NZSAS raid Operation Burnham took place but maintained that claims of civilian casualties were "unfounded." On 19 March, the NZDF confirmed that the photos published in Hit & Run were taken in the same location where Operation Burnham had taken place.

On 9 April 2018, the Chief Ombudsman Peter Boshier ruled in favour of the New Zealand Defense Force's decision to withhold most of the information relating to Operation Burnham. On 11 April, Attorney-General David Parker announced that the Government would be holding an inquiry into Operation Burnham and the allegations in Hit & Run.

=== IGIS Reference Group ===
On 16 April 2018, Nicky Hager was appointed as a member of the Inspector-General of Intelligence and Security's Reference Group, an advisory group of journalists, lawyers, academics, and advocates that would scrutinise the legality of the actions of New Zealand's intelligence agencies, the NZSIS and GCSB. Hager's appointment was criticised by the National Party's GCSB and NZSIS spokesperson Gerry Brownlee, who pointed to his previous criticism of the NZSIS.

=== Dirty Work ===
Hager released his book Dirty Work: The Taxpayers' Union and New Zealand's Hard Right on the New Zealand Taxpayers' Union in September 2026.

== Honours and awards ==
In the 2023 King's Birthday and Coronation Honours, Hager was appointed an Officer of the New Zealand Order of Merit, for services to investigative journalism.

== Personal life ==
Hager lives in Wellington in a house that he built.

== Bibliography ==
- Secret Power, New Zealand's Role in the International Spy Network; Craig Potton Publishing, Nelson, NZ; ISBN 0-908802-35-8; 1996. (eBook of Secret Power)
- Secrets and Lies: The Anatomy of an Anti-Environmental PR Campaign (with Bob Burton); Craig Potton Publishing, Nelson, NZ; ISBN 0-908802-57-9; 1999.
- Seeds of Distrust: The Story of a GE Cover-up; Craig Potton Publishing, Nelson, NZ; ISBN 0-908802-92-7; 2002.
- The Hollow Men: A study in the politics of deception; Craig Potton Publishing, Nelson, NZ; ISBN 1-877333-62-X; 2006.
- Other People's Wars: New Zealand in Afghanistan, Iraq and the war on terror; Craig Potton Publishing, Nelson, NZ; ISBN 978-1-877517-69-3; 2011.
- Dirty Politics: How attack politics is poisoning New Zealand’s political environment; Craig Potton Publishing, Nelson, NZ; ISBN 9781927213360; 2014.
- Hager, Nicky; Stephenson, Jon (2017). Hit & Run: The New Zealand SAS in Afghanistan and the meaning of honour. Nelson, NZ. ISBN 978-0-947503-39-0.
- Dirty Work: The Taxpayers' Union and New Zealand's Hard Right; Potton & Burton, Nelson, NZ; ISBN 9781988550916; 2026.
