= Cathy Odgers =

New Zealand blogger and lawyer

- Other name: Cactus Kate
- Occupations: Blogger, columnist, lawyer
- Known for: Cactus Kate blog

Cathy Odgers is a New Zealand-born, Hong Kong–based former blogger and lawyer who is best known for running a smear campaign against the head of the New Zealand Serious Fraud Office. She published the Cactus Kate blog, and wrote the fortnightly Cactus Kate column in The Dominion Post from 2006 to 2009.

In 2009, Odgers was declared one of New Zealand's "hottest singles" by The Sunday Star-Times.

In 2011, it was reported in that Odgers was expected to be approved as a list candidate for the ACT party, however she was not included on ACT's eventual party list for the 2011 general election.

In 2013, Odgers was part of a group of three pranksters who taped New Zealand flags on the house of America's Cup defender Oracle Team USA principal Larry Ellison in San Francisco, as an act of support for Emirates Team New Zealand.

== Dirty Politics controversy ==
In 2014, private conversations between Odgers, political commentator Matthew Hooton, and blogger Cameron Slater were published in the book Dirty Politics by investigative journalist Nicky Hager. The conversations include an exchange in which Odgers suggests that if the address for Hager is published he may come to physical harm. Odgers subsequently wrote a blog post that included Hager's address that was then published on Slater's blog.

I've done a post for Saturday on whale blog as can't run myself as too close to work. The leaks he is involved with include tens of thousands of rich Chinese. Mainland and HK. It would be a disaster if they all knew where he lived. He may even need police protection. ... Chop chop for Nick.

— Cathy Odgers

Odgers also helped plan a campaign against members of the Maritime Union of New Zealand during the 2011 Ports of Auckland industrial dispute in which port management leaked a union member's personnel file.

== Serious Fraud Office controversy ==
Soon after the release of Dirty Politics, Odgers' employer confirmed she was no longer working for them "by mutual consent". Mark Hotchin allegedly paid Odgers to run a smear campaign against the head of the Serious Fraud Office and the Financial Markets Authority, while Hotchin was being investigated by said authorities. This led to the Minister of Justice Judith Collins losing her job.
