= Native Forest Action =

New Zealand environmental group

Native Forest Action (NFA) was set up protect the publicly owned native forests of the West Coast of the South Island of New Zealand from logging.

The West Coast has extensive stands of virgin native forests and numerous organisations had lobbied for their protection. In 1986 the West Coast Accord was signed between environmental groups and government agencies. There was discord amongst other environmental groups since it was seen to be too much of a compromise towards the logging interests. This should be seen in light of the fact that New Zealand had lost approximately 75% of its original forest cover since human habitation.

In 1997 the NFA campaign involved protesters setting up camps in the forest and tree sitting. In April 1997, one of these sites was deliberately destroyed by swinging a tree from a helicopter into it, allegedly without ensuring that it was fully clear of protesters.

NFA had a campaign of non-violent direct action which gained it prominence in the media. The New Zealand Labour Party made an election promise in 1999 to halt the logging. One of the most controversial parts of campaign history was when a bomb was found on a helicopter used for logging. NFA, which had always maintained a policy of non-violence denied vigorously any links to the bomb, and no link was found.

It is claimed that the release of the book Secrets and Lies by Nicky Hager prior to the 1999 general election had an influence on the election of the Labour Party. The book made detailed claims about an organised smear campaign against NFA by public relations firm Shandwick on behalf of Timberlands West Coast, the company tasked with sustainably harvesting West Coast beech forests. The Labour/Alliance coalition government halted the logging and the land was transferred to the Department of Conservation.

NFA, which as an organisation always had a very informal structure, is now dormant.
