= 1986 in the environment =

This is a list of notable events relating to the environment in 1986. They relate to environmental law, conservation, environmentalism and environmental issues.

== Events ==
- The International Geosphere-Biosphere Programme is launched.
- The Quota Management System commences. It is a type of individual fishing quota that is used in New Zealand to manage fish stocks.
- Northern river reversal, an ambitious project to divert the flow of the Northern rivers in the Soviet Union, was abandoned, primarily for environmental reasons.
- A number of protected areas were created, including Taroko National Park in Taiwan, and Żywiec Landscape Park, in Poland.

=== April ===
- The Chernobyl disaster, a catastrophic nuclear accident, occurred at the Chernobyl Nuclear Power Plant in Ukraine.

=== June ===
- US President Ronald Reagan signed the Safe Drinking Water Act Amendments of 1986

=== September ===
- The Balloonfest '86, a publicity stunt in Cleveland, Ohio, it aimed to break the world record for the largest simultaneous balloon release. However, the event led to unforeseen environmental damage and disruptions in the city, where thousands of balloons ended up in Lake Erie, hampering search and rescue operations and littering the shores.

=== November ===
- The Sandoz chemical spill, a major environmental disaster caused by a fire and its subsequent control, occurred at the Sandoz agrochemical storehouse in Schweizerhalle, Basel-Landschaft, Switzerland, on November 1, 1986. It released toxic agrochemicals into the air and resulted in tons of pollutants entering the Rhine river, turning it red.
- The West Coast Accord was signed between government, industry and environmental organisations concerning the conservation forests of the West Coast of New Zealand.

=== December ===
- The Environment Act 1986 is passed in New Zealand, established the Ministry for the Environment and the Office of the Parliamentary Commissioner for the Environment.

== See also ==
- Human impact on the environment
- List of environmental issues
- List of years in the environment
