= Żywiec Landscape Park =

Landscape park in Silesian Voivodeship, Poland

Coordinates: 49.5575°N 19.2006°E

- Żywiecki Park Krajobrazowy
- IUCN category V (protected landscape/seascape)
- Interactive map of Żywiec Landscape Park
- Location: Silesian Voivodeship
- Area: 359 km^{2} (139 sq mi)
- Established: 1986

Żywiec Landscape Park (Żywiecki Park Krajobrazowy) is a protected area (Landscape Park) in southern Poland. It was established in 1986 and covers an area of 359 square kilometres (139 sq mi).

The Park lies within Silesian Voivodeship and is named after the town of Żywiec.

== See also ==
- 1986 in the environment
