= Unity Books =

New Zealand independent bookseller

Coordinates: 41°17′16.13″S 174°46′32.43″E

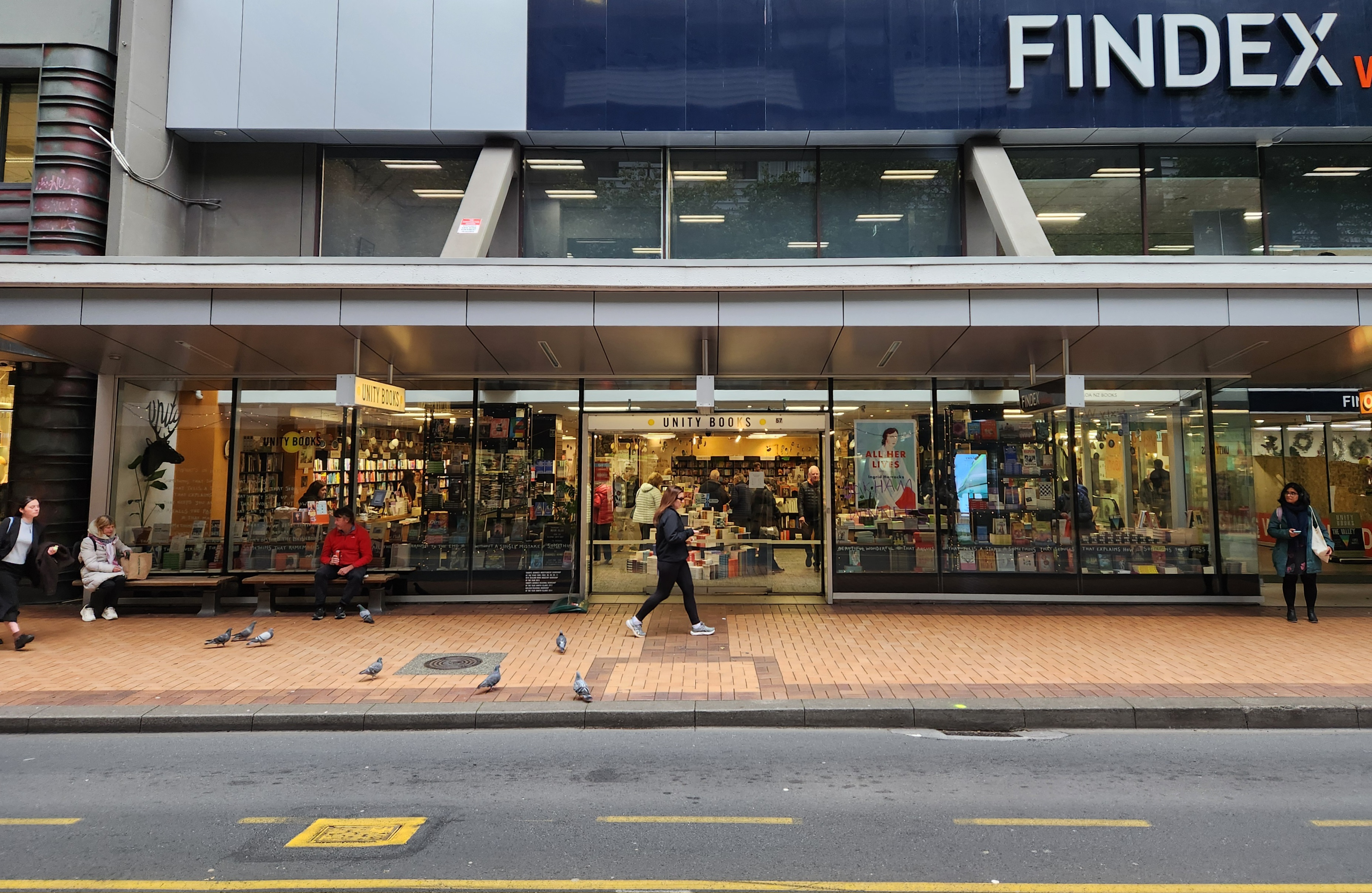
- Unity Books, Wellington
- Type: Independent
- Industry: Retail, Books
- Founded: 1967
- Founder: Alan Preston
- Headquarters: Wellington, Auckland, New Zealand
- Number of locations: 2
- Key people: Directors: Tilly Lloyd (Wellington); Jo McColl; Lawrence McColl
- Website: www.unitybooks.co.nz

Unity Books is an independent New Zealand bookseller founded in Wellington by the New Zealand sportsman Alan Preston in 1967. It has a bookshop in Wellington, and separate adult and children's bookshops in adjacent premises in Auckland.

== History ==
Alan Preston, a successful cricket and soccer player, established Unity Books in 1967 after his brother died from a cricket ball accident in 1960, and a period of "intense soul-searching" and renewed interest in philosophy. The first bookshop was in a small premises in the former Empire Building on 15–19 Willis Street. The shop moved a short distance opposite to 42 Willis Street in 1972, when the Empire Building was due to be demolished the following year to make way for the construction of the Bank of New Zealand's new 20-storey BNZ Centre.

In 1986 the store moved to Perrett's Corner, and opened its first branch in 1989 on Auckland's High Street. The Wellington bookshop moved again in 1998, to its current premises in Findex House at 57 Willis Street.

In 2005 after Preston's death, the Wellington and Auckland bookshops were separately re-incorporated under new staff ownership. The Wellington bookshop was further renovated and expanded in 2011, and celebrated its 45th anniversary the following year. The Wellington bookshop is co-owned by Tilly Lloyd.

Between 2014 and 2024, Unity Books Wellington was part of the "Culture Vulture" scheme, whereby customers could buy and redeem vouchers at any of Unity Books, Slow Boat Records, or Aro Video shops in Wellington.

In 2018, Unity Books Auckland opened its children's bookshop "Little Unity" next door, on the corner of High Street and Vulcan Lane. In 2020, the Auckland shop won the International Bookstore of the Year Award at the London Book Fair. Since November 2024, the Wellington bookshop is managed by Susanna Andrew, former editor of North & South magazine.

=== Notable events ===
Unity Books runs approximately 45 author events and launches per year and the shop works extensive off-site events as well. Except for 2 Festivals, Unity Books has been the contracted bookseller for Writers and Readers Week, the most intellectually muscled of the NZ literary festivals. In October 2013, Eleanor Catton's Man Booker prize-winning The Luminaries was launched at Unity Books.

In August 2014, Nicky Hager's book Dirty Politics was launched at the Wellington bookshop with a media pack and crowd of approximately 250 people.
