= Jordan Williams (New Zealand lawyer) =

Lawyer, political campaigner

- Williams in 2025
- Born: Jordan Henry Williams; 1986 (age 39–40)
- Occupations: Lawyer; Political activist
- Years active: 2011–present
- Organization: New Zealand Taxpayers' Union

Jordan Henry Williams (born 1986) is a New Zealand lawyer best known for his political activities, which are often connected to the National or ACT parties, and his lobbying for liberal and conservative causes. He is a founder and the current executive director of the New Zealand Taxpayers' Union, a past president of the World Taxpayers Associations, a co-founder and council member of the Free Speech Union, and the chief executive officer and a director of the Campaign Company.

In the second half of the 2010s a lengthy defamation dispute between Williams and former Conservative Party leader Colin Craig reached the Supreme Court. Williams was initially awarded a New Zealand record amount of $1.27M (overturned on appeal), but ended up issuing an apology and making an undisclosed payment to Craig in a negotiated settlement.

== Early life and education ==
Williams grew up in Hawke's Bay and attended Lindisfarne College. He was a member of the Hastings Youth Council and a Youth MP. When he was 15 years old, he joined the New Zealand Green Party, motivated by a fear of genetic engineering. While studying law and accounting at Victoria University of Wellington he interned for family friend Don Brash (National Party leader 2003–2006). In 2008 he was involved in former ACT MP Stephen Franks' election campaign as a National Party candidate. This led to him working at Franks' law firm, Franks & Ogilvie, for four years.

== Dirty Politics and Vote For Change ==
At 25 years old, Williams was a leading spokesman for Vote For Change, the main group that unsuccessfully campaigned against MMP in the 2011 New Zealand voting system referendum. Williams attended a New Zealand First party rally where Winston Peters dismissed Vote For Change as "a National Party jack-up".

Also in 2011 Williams assisted Don Brash's takeover of the ACT party leadership. At the time he described his work as a short-term legal assignment. In 2014, Nicky Hager's book Dirty Politics alleged that Williams had been involved in blackmailing Rodney Hide to stand down in favour of Brash. As told in the book, Williams' role was to obtain "dodgy texts" that Hide had allegedly sent to a young woman. Both Williams and Hide denied the story.

Dirty Politics was based mostly on emails hacked from "attack-blogger" Cameron Slater, who ran the blog WhaleOil. Its main theme was secret collaboration between National Party figures including Judith Collins and Slater. Williams was included in three separate exchanges covered in the book, and Hager later characterised him as an "enthusiastic helper, ready to help dig dirt on the latest target". After the book came out Williams said that he and Slater still spoke "every day", but that he had fallen out with another of the key players, political strategist Simon Lusk.

== Taxpayers' Union ==
In 2013, Williams and David Farrar founded the New Zealand Taxpayers' Union as an incorporated society. Williams attended the Atlas Network's ten-day training program the Think Tank MBA in 2015. He attended Atlas Network's four-week Smith Fellowship in 2018.

To draw attention to public spending that the Taxpayers' Union considered wasteful, a series of publicity stunts featured Williams, dressed in a black suit and bowtie, and a second person wearing a full-body costume in the style of Porky Pig. Williams and "Porky" would visit government entities and film themselves attempting to present awards such as a "Waste Watch" certificate to MBIE and a "certificate of achievement and imagination" to a bemused middle manager at the Rotorua Lakes District Council.

As a Taxpayer Union spokesman Williams has opposed raising the minimum wage, workplace safety training, broadcast funding for The Civilian Party, tobacco tax increases (a position that the Taxpayers' Union took without declaring its tobacco industry relationships), the Low Emission Vehicles Contestable Fund, Māori wards in local government, and the Three Waters reforms.

Williams was the chair and president of the World Taxpayers Associations, which connects organisations like New Zealand's Taxpayers' Union from over 60 countries, from 2023 to 2026. He was first elected to its board in 2019.

NZME publications, including the New Zealand Herald, have carried occasional opinion columns by Williams since 2017. Writing mostly about politics, tax and spending, his articles variously declared his interest as Chief Executive of the Taxpayers' Union, or only as "a Wellington-based lawyer, lobbyist and commentator".

=== Auckland Ratepayers' Alliance ===
Williams founded the Auckland Ratepayers' Alliance as a company in 2015, using the Taxpayers' Union in Wellington as its registered office address. Williams moderated a Ratepayers' Alliance candidate debate during the 2019 Auckland mayoral election. For the 2022 civic elections Williams simultaneously ran the Ratepayers' Alliance, which commented (often negatively) about various candidates' policies, and worked on multiple mayoral election campaigns. He denied that this situation created any conflicts of interest. Williams owned the Ratepayers' Alliance company until it was wound up in 2021, with its activities being absorbed into the Taxpayers' Union.

== Free Speech Union ==
In 2018 Williams was a co-founder of the Free Speech Coalition, which later renamed itself the Free Speech Union (FSU). The group's initial motivation was to overturn Mayor of Auckland Phil Goff's cancellation of an event featuring alt-right speakers Lauren Southern and Stefan Molyneux at a council-owned venue. Their challenges were unsuccessful in both the High Court and the Court of Appeal. Williams remains a board Member of the Free Speech Union.

In March 2021 the FSU registered as a union under the Employment Relations Act. In the 2021–22 year covered by its first annual report as a union, the FSU made three submissions to Parliament – against "safe zone" legislation that prohibits protest near abortion service providers, against aspects of the bill prohibiting conversion therapy, and against a bill strengthening plain language practices within the Government.

== The Campaign Company ==
Williams is the founder, part-owner and chief executive of the Campaign Company, a digital campaign agency. Its clients include Groundswell NZ and Don Brash's lobby group, Hobson's Pledge. It has faced multiple accusations of astroturfing.

During the 2022 Auckland mayoral election the company worked for two candidates – Leo Molloy and Viv Beck. Its working relationship with Molloy ended after the Auckland Ratepayers' Alliance (also run by Williams) criticised him in a full-page newspaper ad.

The company runs a number of campaign websites on behalf of Hobson's Pledge, including We Belong Aotearoa, which disguised its association with the group. It used Māori proverbs like "whiria te tāngata" ("weave the people together"), stock images of people from a range of cultural backgrounds, and even a Dame Whina Cooper photo and quote, to oppose co-governance ("a legal concept of shared management" which includes Māori representation) without mentioning the term. Because Hobson's Pledge lobbies against the use of the Māori language, and the name "Aotearoa" in particular, the "We Belong Aotearoa" site was called offensive, insulting, and deceitful by cultural advisor Karaitiana Taiuru. Dylan Reeve, author of Fake Believe: Conspiracy Theories in Aotearoa, called the campaign an example of astroturfing – a fake grassroots group.

Another Campaign Company website, Save Our Stores, was designed to look like a grassroots campaign organised by small retailers against the Smokefree 2025 Act. It was found to be funded by British American Tobacco and Imperial Brands, and its message was disavowed by the 6000-member Dairy and Business Owners Group. Another of William's vehicles, the Taxpayers' Union, has also taken pro-tobacco positions while accepting funding from the tobacco industry.

In August 2024, shortly after that year's Local Government New Zealand conference, mayors and councillors throughout New Zealand received an email survey from a previously unknown group called "Civic Pulse". This organisation had been created the day before by the Taxpayers' Union, with the Campaign Company playing an administrative role. Neither of these affiliations were declared proactively. Williams said that this was deliberate, in order not to sway people's answers in the survey, but that the relationships were disclosed to "anyone who asked".

In mid-April 2025, The Post reported that the conservative justice advocacy group Sensible Sentencing Trust (SST) had hired the Campaign Company to produce several billboard ads in Auckland and Wellington attacking Green Party MP Tamatha Paul and co-leader Chlöe Swarbrick. On 14 April, the Advertising Standards Authority confirmed that it was assessing complaints against the attack ads.

In late October 2026, the Campaign Group produced several billboards for the SST accusing Hipkins and Greens co-leaders Marama Davidson and Chlöe Swarbrick of supporting criminal gangs. In response, the Greens filed a complaint against the Sensible Sentencing Trust with the Advertising Standards Authority, accusing the group of "impersonating" the party. On 27 October, the SST removed images of the politicians from its attack advertisements but retained the message. The group's national director Louise Parson denied the Greens' allegation that the Trust was an astroturf group of the Taxpayers' Union, while acknowledging that the two groups worked together on media campaigns.

== Colin Craig defamation case ==
Shortly after the 2014 New Zealand general election Rachel MacGregor, who had resigned as Conservative Party leader Colin Craig's press secretary late in the campaign, alleged—in communication with Williams—that Craig had sexually harassed her. MacGregor and Craig reached a confidential settlement in 2015.

Williams promised MacGregor and her lawyer to keep this information, and documents that she shared with him, private. He then used the information to persuade the party's board to end Craig's leadership, and in articles he wrote under a pseudonym ("Concerned Conservative") on right-wing blog WhaleOil. A judge later described these actions as a "campaign" against Craig. Williams said that he acted in MacGregor's defence after Craig breached the confidentiality he'd promised her.

Craig responded with a pamphlet that was delivered to 1.6 million homes and claimed that he had been defamed. He said that Williams was lying, and that he would sue Williams and others. Williams consequently sued Craig for defaming him in the pamphlet. Among a number of witnesses called by Craig, Martyn Bradbury gave evidence of Williams' character, describing him as "manipulative", a "political sadist" and like "a venomous spider". In this initial case Williams was awarded a record $1.27 million, which was later found to be excessive. A series of appeals from both sides followed and the case reached the Supreme Court.

In December 2019, after more than four years of legal action, Williams and Craig settled. Williams issued an apology and agreed to make an undisclosed payment to Craig. Part of Williams' apology said, "I am now aware that a number of statements I made to others about Mr Craig were not true. I deeply regret what has happened and my involvement in spreading those allegations. I apologise to Mr Craig and his family unreservedly."

The public reaction to the case included sympathy for MacGregor, who gave evidence in multiple cases that she had neither brought nor was defending, and condemnation of both Williams and Craig. Allegations of Craig's behaviour towards MacGregor had not been public until they were presented as evidence by Williams, and she told the High Court that she felt "on trial by proxy" and "didn't want to be part of...this, their defamation thing, two men angry about something." Williams summed up reporting of the long-running case as "who do you despise more, the neoliberal prick [Williams] or the conservative monster [Craig]?"
