= Dirty Politics =

2014 book by Nicky Hager

Dirty politics: How Attack Politics is Poisoning New Zealand's Political Environment
- Author: Nicky Hager
- Language: English
- Subject: Politics
- Publisher: Craig Potton Publishing
- Publication date: 13 August 2014
- Publication place: New Zealand
- Media type: Paperback and ebook
- Pages: 166
- ISBN: 978-1-927213-36-0
- OCLC: 886960771

Dirty Politics: How Attack Politics is Poisoning New Zealand's Political Environment is a book by Nicky Hager published in August 2014.

The book is based on emails hacked from Cameron Slater's Gmail account and on Facebook chats. These communications occurred around the same time that a denial-of-service (DOS) attack took down Slater's website – the right-wing blog Whale Oil Beef Hooked – and feature hundreds of items of correspondence in which prominent New Zealanders are criticised and vilified. Hager's book describes a lengthy history of correspondence between Slater and Justice Minister Judith Collins that eventually contributed to her resignation as a minister. In response to the allegations in the book, Prime Minister John Key said that he talked to Slater on a regular basis. Hager claimed that using bloggers rather than journalists allowed Key to maintain a friendly public persona, while using right-wing blogs as a vehicle to attack opponents. Other bloggers mentioned in the book include Matthew Hooton, Cathy Odgers (who goes by the name of Cactus Kate) and David Farrar. Hager reserves his strongest criticism for Cameron Slater, who he says received payment to write attack articles on public figures who opposed or criticised National Party policy – and the book identifies those who paid him.

It was followed up in September 2026 with Dirty Work, which was promoted as the third part of a "Dirty Politics trilogy" that retrospectively included Dirty Politics and 2006's The Hollow Men.

== Background ==
Whale Oil Beef Hooked (generally referred to as WhaleOil) is the personal blog of Cameron Slater which he started in 2005. Slater, the son of former National Party president John Slater, claims WhaleOil is a "super-blog" attracting over one million unique visits every month. He admitted at that time to suffering from depression and has a reputation for vitriol and anger. He said in 2010 that he didn't care if people regarded him as 'stupid, a bully, or vicious' but would resent being called a hypocrite.

In January 2014, WhaleOil was hacked some time after he posted a blog post with the headline "Feral dies in Greymouth, did world a favour." Three other children in this family had already been killed in accidents and the post provoked a 'furious public reaction'. Some weeks later, Hager received an 8 gigabyte USB stick in the mail containing thousands of pages of emails hacked from Slater's website. Hager contacted the hacker, known as Rawshark, and persuaded him that putting the information in a book would provide "something more lasting and of bigger value" than releasing it on Twitter. Hager says Rawshark was motivated by his dislike of Slater, and that he secretly met the hacker in public parks to discuss how the information should be released. He then spent a significant amount of time analysing the content and only published material which he believed was in the public interest. He was careful to avoid releasing sensitive material about Slater and others mentioned in the hacked emails which did not involve a significant public interest.

=== Production ===
The production, printing, and distribution of the book was done in secret by Craig Potton Publishing. Co-owner of the publishing company, Robbie Burton, said: "It was one of the great and surreal and scary moments of my publishing career." Burton said the secrecy was necessary because they were wary that the book might annoy some people with "deep pockets" who "might be inclined to revenge". The book was produced very quickly by Craig Potton Publishing, where staff worked on it from Thursday evening to the following Tuesday. Once the book was finished, first it was printed in secret in Wellington, before being shipped back to Nelson and stored in a warehouse, and then finally being sent unannounced to stores around the country.

== Release ==
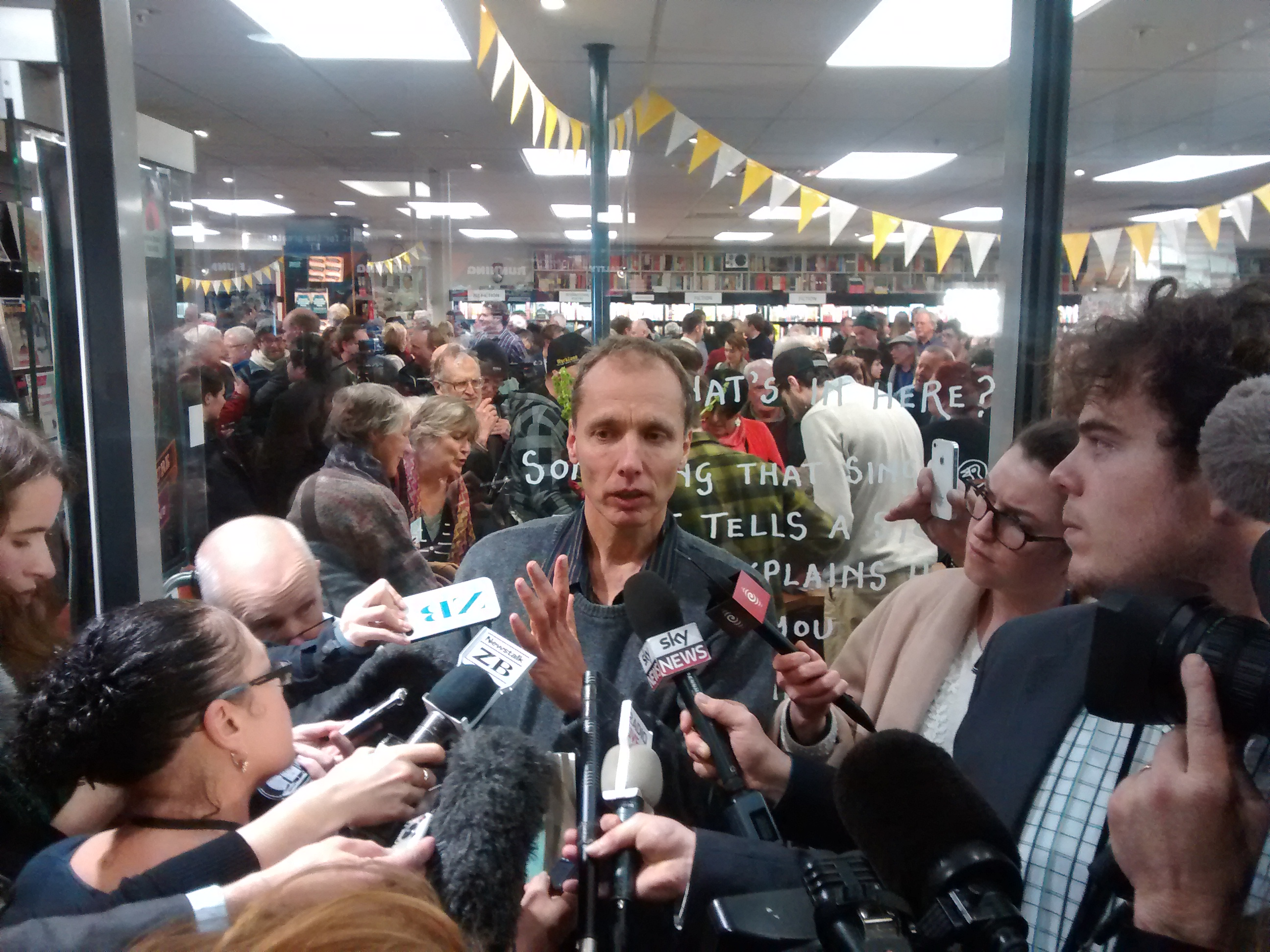
Hager speaking to journalists outside the launch of Dirty Politics

Dirty Politics was released at Unity Books in Wellington on 13 August 2014, with a crowd of approximately 150. Prior to the release of the book, details of what it would be about were the subject of substantial speculation, as the topic of the book was kept secret in order to avoid it being blocked from release by a court injunction.

Four days after release, it had sold about 10,000 copies, in addition to 1,000 e-book sales. Robbie Burton, executive director of Craig Potton Publishing, said: "I've never seen anything like this before, in terms of the speed at which it's happening." A week after release, sales had reached approximately 15,000, and by mid September, sales were at almost 20,000. The first two chapters are available free on-line.

Two weeks after the release of the book, Hager spoke at the four-day biennial Writers & Readers Festival in Christchurch. About 5000 people attended 57 events, one of which was a public discussion called Secrets, Spies and Free Speech featuring Dirty Politics author Nicky Hager, Guardian journalist Luke Harding and Australian journalist Richard King. The discussion was mainly about the freedom of speech in Western democracies.

== Main features ==
Hager provides numerous incidents of dirty politics in the book. He describes multiple email exchanges between Cameron Slater and National Party spin doctor Jason Ede who works for Prime Minister John Key. Up till August 2011 Mr Ede was employed by Ministerial Services and, in effect, was paid by the taxpayer. Hager says Ede tried to avoid scrutiny by using a 'dynamic' IP address, one that changed frequently making it difficult for him to be identified. When the book was published, Mr Ede was employed by the National Party, rather than by John Key, but was still working from the Prime Minister's office. He resigned the day before the election.

Dirty Politics also describes numerous email contacts between Cameron Slater and Judith Collins who are long-time friends. The email records span from 2009 to 2014 covering the entire time she was in Cabinet. One particular email shows that Collins asked Slater to edit her Wikipedia page and sent him a new photo with the message: "Cam, any chance of a better photo going up?? Eek it looks really bad." Slater appears to have obliged using the pseudonym 'Jc press sec', (Note: Collins' photo was changed in February 2013 subsequent to this discussion by Jc press sec, and The Herald reporting confirms that it was Slater who was acting for Collins.) which was subsequently changed to Polkad0t.

In return, Slater also asked Collins for favours. The emails indicate Slater asked Ms Collins to get a prisoner moved to a different prison, while she was Minister of Corrections. Slater asked Collins to get him moved because he was friends with the prisoner's ex-wife, who wanted the man moved further away from their daughter who had been visiting him in prison.

The more serious allegations in Dirty Politics are described below. Radio New Zealand political editor Brent Edwards says that while the book is not always definitive,

it includes enough evidence to suggest National has orchestrated a campaign of political vilification using bloggers, Cameron Slater in particular, to do the dirty work. Some bloggers... have no compunction using material even if its veracity is questionable. Cameron Slater – and the extent to which he is prepared to go – takes attack politics to a whole new plane.

=== The Labour Party website ===
One of the main allegations is that during the 2011 election campaign, Cameron Slater and Jason Ede took advantage of a badly configured website to enter the database of the Labour Party website. This enabled them to look at emails and personal details which were then used to attack the Labour Party. 18,000 emails, lists of the party's donors and supporters and their credit-card transactions were downloaded. The book reveals Mr Slater and Mr Ede both accessed the site more than once and then "plotted how best to reveal the downloaded material on Mr Slater's blog". Slater did not deny he had accessed the website in May 2011, and said: "I was certainly into the backend of the Labour Party's website, if they couldn't manage security of their website, their credit card details and financial information about their membership, well then they weren't really fit for government at the time."

Hager alleges that material from the website breach was selectively released by Slater, starting from 12 June.

In response to being accused of illegally accessing the Labour website, Slater published a blog post titled "My confession: How I accessed the Labour Party web site". In the post, he shows how he claims to have accessed information on four Labour party websites, and denies allegations of "hacking". Using easily accessible links, he could view all the files on the web server, including sensitive membership and credit card information which was unencrypted.

Mr Key also claimed there was nothing wrong with Jason Ede accessing the Labour Party website because "they left their website open." He justified the action to Radio New Zealand by saying: "If the Wallabies on Tuesday night had left their starting line-up up on their website, on their private website, would the All Blacks go and have a look? The answer is yes. The reason I know that is it's happened."

=== The Security Intelligence Service ===
Another allegation is that in 2011, the Prime Minister's office facilitated the release of confidential Security Intelligence Service (SIS) documents to Cameron Slater so he could use them to embarrass Phil Goff. Slater made an Official Information Act (OIA) request to the SIS for confidential documents which confirmed the SIS had briefed Phil Goff about suspected Israeli spies who left the country after the second Christchurch earthquake – after Goff had said publicly he was not briefed. Slater was given access to documents within 24 hours – long before other media outlets who had also asked for them. Slater's emails described in Dirty Politics suggest he knew what was in the documents before they were released and that the OIA would be expedited in unusually quick time. Goff believes this inside information could only have come from the SIS director Warren Tucker or from staff in the prime minister's office.

=== Attacks on public servant ===
The book also presents evidence which suggests that Justice Minister Judith Collins leaked the name of public servant, Simon Pleasants, to Cameron Slater. Pleasants worked in the ministerial property department at Internal Affairs, and Collins assumed he was responsible for leaking details of Mr English's accommodation payments to Labour in 2009. Slater then published a series of blog attacks on Pleasants – who subsequently received a torrent of abuse including death threats. Pleasants did not leak any information about English.

Nick Bryant, Gerry Brownlee's press secretary is identified in Dirty Politics as the user of the pseudonym "Former Hack" to post anonymous comments on Whaleoil encouraging Cameron Slater's campaign against Pleasants. On 23 August, The New Zealand Herald reported it was able to confirm the use of Mr Bryant's ministerial computer and subsequently revealed that hundreds of messages were sent from ministerial or government computers to the comments section of Slater's blog. The messages are linked to email addresses on government servers and IP addresses from which they were posted.

=== Commercial 'hit' jobs ===
Dirty Politics also refers to hacked emails which suggest Slater allowed his website to be used for commercial "hit" jobs supplied by PR consultant, Carrick Graham, whose clients include tobacco and alcohol companies. For instance, Slater has frequently used his WhaleOil blog to attack Professor Doug Sellman, a leading authority on addiction and an outspoken critic of the alcohol industry posting blogs with pejorative titles such as "Confirmed: Doug Sellman Gone Mad". These were based on information supplied by Carrick Graham, son of former National party member Sir Douglas Graham. Hager says Carrick Graham's company, Facilitate Communications, paid Slater $6,555 a month and speculated that it was for him to do attack blogs.

=== Katherine Rich ===
Former National MP Katherine Rich, the chief executive of the NZ Food and Grocery Council, is implicated in the book. Emails show that information she passed to Carrick Graham was passed on to Slater. Slater then used the information to attack health campaigners such as Professor Doug Sellman who campaigns about liquor legislation and New Zealand Herald columnist Wendyl Nissen, who writes about additives and healthy food.

New Zealand allows 14 additives that have been banned or never allowed in the European Union or the United States and in her role at the New Zealand Food and Grocery Council, Katherine Rich, has claimed all additives used in New Zealand are safe. Ms Nissen said she was attacked because Katherine Rich objected to her "highlighting the use of artificial colours commonly used in soft drinks and processed foods and the fact many had been banned in other countries." Confirming his connection with Katherine Rich, Slater publicly acknowledged that she had paid him twice, but claimed it was for speaking at conferences not for writing blog articles.

However, in 2012, the National Government appointed Rich to the board of the Health Promotional Agency, which runs campaigns to promote healthier lifestyles. In this capacity, Katherine Rich's primary role is to promote public health, suggesting her involvement with the Food and Grocery Council means she has a conflict of interest. Once the allegations in Dirty Politics became public, a group of 33 scientists and health practitioners were so concerned they wrote to John Key asking him to investigate Rich's apparent conflict of interest.

Green Party health spokesperson Kevin Hague said Rich should resign, arguing that "Katherine Rich, Carrick Graham and Cameron Slater have all been involved in a systematic undermining of health promotion in New Zealand. She cannot tenably remain on the board of that organisation." Rich responded by saying she had never been involved in undermining public health and found the claim very offensive. She said she put her heart and soul into the Health Promotion Agency and adhered to all parts of the Crown Entities Act.

Nevertheless, the Auditor-General was asked to investigate and conducted a review of the HPA's board minutes. It declared "we have not identified any particular matters before, or decisions by, the HPA board that might raise serious concerns about its management of conflicts of interest". However, the Auditor-General acknowledged they did not interview Ms Rich, nor did they investigate "allegations in Nicky Hager's 2014 book Dirty Politics about things Mrs Rich is said to have done in her private capacity". Rich said she felt vindicated by the finding, but the Green Party called for an additional investigation by the State Services Commission.

== Further revelations ==
=== Attacks on the Serious Fraud Office ===
On 30 August, John Key released an email written by Slater in 2011 suggesting Judith Collins was also 'gunning' for former Serious Fraud Office (SFO) boss Adam Feely. Collins was the Minister responsible for the SFO at the time, and the email said: "Any information that we can provide her [Collins] on his [Feely's] background is appreciated." It was addressed to 'Mark' (with the surname redacted) and Carrick Graham.

Other emails, released to Fairfax Media by Rawshark, appear to suggest that 'Mark' is former Hanover Finance director Mark Hotchin. Hotchin secretly paid Slater and another right wing blogger, Cathy Odgers, to write attack posts undermining Feely, the SFO and the Financial Markets Authority while they were investigating the collapse of Hanover Finance in 2011. Slater wrote a series of highly critical blogs about Feely in late 2011.

=== Release of emails on @WhaleDump ===
Prime Minister John Key characterised Dirty Politics as a "cynically timed attack" from "a well known left wing [sic] conspiracy theorist". In response to Key's criticism that the book's publication so close to the 2014 general election was designed to be a political bombshell, Hager says he published the material that was provided to him in March 2014 as soon as he could. Rather than being timed for maximum political damage, Hager says "it was actually just the practicalities of how fast I could get it out."

Mr Key went on to say the book "makes all sorts of unfounded allegations and voters will see it for what it is." He also accused Nicky Hager of joining "a whole lot of dots that can't be connected." Key said: "[Hager] didn't do what a true journalist would do. He didn't go and check out the facts, he didn't try and get that side of the story."

In response, Hager spoke to his source to try to get back some of the emails that the book was based on in order to release them online. The hacker, known as Rawshark, apparently said: "Leave this to me" and began releasing the emails through an account on Twitter, @WhaleDump. The emails seem to back up many of the claims Hager makes in the book. The hacker also communicated with journalists using encryption to protect his identity. He denied any political motivation but indicated a desire to "take down this corrupt network".

After a series of email releases on the @WhaleDump account, Cameron Slater tried to take out a court injunction to prevent the media from reporting hacked information obtained from his Whale Oil blog. Media lawyer Julian Miles QC argued on behalf of the media outlets that the information was of huge public interest. High Court Judge John Fogarty agreed but granted an order stopping the hacker, who was an unnamed defendant, from publishing any more "WhaleDumps", although media were allowed to publish material they had already received. In his judgement Justice Fogarty said that Slater's case against the hacker was overwhelming and that taking information from his computer was akin to entering someone's private property and taking their private papers. He wrote: "There is no doubt at all that (Slater) has a serious argument that the unknown hacker has committed a wrong or tort against him, to which the common law will grant such remedies as can be practicably imposed."

On 4 September, the original @WhaleDump account was suspended by Twitter. Soon afterwards, the hacker Rawshark reopened a Twitter account with the username @Whaledump2. On 5 September, after the release of a number of other documents online, Rawshark announced that he would no longer be releasing any information, tweeting a number of messages:

"This was never about party politics for me. I have done what I set out to do. It is time to go. #whaledump"

"I know vigilantism is a dangerous final resort. I hope history judges me kindly. #whaledump"

"If I didn't do it, who would have? If I didn't do it this way, how could it have been done? #whaledump"

"Don't try this at home.. unless you think it's important enough to risk 7 years in jail. Think it through. #whaledump" ...

"By the time you read this, every device used in this operation will have been destroyed and disposed of along with all the decryption keys."

== Impact ==
The New Zealand Herald commentator John Armstrong wrote: "Hager's allegations are many and varied. They are extremely serious." Armstrong points to the allegation of the involvement of National Party personnel in hacking into the Labour Party database as the most serious, and draws parallels with the Watergate scandal. David Cunliffe, leader of the Labour Party, also describes the events portrayed in the book as akin to Watergate.

The revelations in Dirty Politics have also been reported in international media. Under the headline "New Zealand's own House of Cards is collapsing", The Guardian newspaper said "New Zealanders are currently witnesses to an exposé of unprecedented proportions." Also in The Guardian, New Zealand journalist Toby Manhire wrote: "Dirty Politics has blown the National party (election) strategy dramatically off course, propelling the campaign into uncharted territory. Its allegations have dominated news bulletins for the 10 days since its publication, as accusations of dirty tricks, smear campaigns and conspiracy sally in every direction." In addition to the calls for Judith Collins to resign, Manhire suggested that John Key's "sparkling reputation" may be "contaminated by association with Slater's toxic style."

Cameron Slater subsequently laid a complaint with the police about the illegal hacking of his emails, and made a separate complaint with the Privacy Commissioner over the release of the email by the Prime Minister.

=== Resignations ===
==== Judith Collins ====
Collins had been under pressure to resign earlier in the year over her involvement with Chinese officials at Oravida. Once Dirty Politics was published and Collins' alleged treatment of public servant Simon Pleasants came to light, there were renewed calls for her resignation. The Public Service Association said her actions breached an important constitutional principle and "Minister Collins must take responsibility for her actions and resign." Labour Leader David Cunliffe said Mr Key should fire Ms Collins, "because she has acted in a way that is unbecoming and unfit" for a minister. Deputy Prime Minister Bill English distanced himself from her behaviour by saying "it's not a style I like". John Key called her "unwise" but refused to take any action.

As the pressure on Collins mounted, she avoided the media entirely for a few days. Then on 23 August she fronted up but refused to answer questions about her friendship with Mr Slater. She declared she had no plans to resign and refused to acknowledge her behaviour was damaging the National Party in any way. A week later right wing blogger, Cathy Odgers, apparently sent the damning email to John Key's office in which Slater said Collins was 'gunning' for Adam Feely. Fairfax Media journalist Matt Nippert, who was investigating the hacked emails, believes that Odgers thought Nippert was about to exposé the connection between Slater, Collins and Feely. He says Odgers panicked and "alerted the Beehive to what may have been coming." John Key called a press conference the next day, Saturday 30 August 2014, at which Collins resigned as a minister.

In October, the Prime Minister announced that Collins would not be allowed to use the title 'Honourable' before her name unless she is cleared by the inquiry into her behaviour. Collins was reported to be 'appalled' and 'seething' that she heard about this decision through the media rather than being told personally by Mr Key.

==== Jason Ede ====
Jason Ede was a central figure in Dirty Politics. Hager said Ede drafted Official Information Act requests on Slater's behalf and was frequently in contact with the blogger about ways to discredit the Labour Party. After the book's release, Ede entirely avoided the media. Slater subsequently described him as "squeamish" and "gutless" for going to ground rather than talking to the media about their relationship.

Ede resigned from his position as a media researcher for the National Party the day before the election. Announcing his resignation after 11 years "loyal service to the National Party", John Key said:

[Jason Ede's] primary role really, started out as a media person for us... and part of his role was talking to bloggers...I think he took the revelations in the book... personally because some of the book was very much aimed at him.

Blogger David Farrar said he thought Ede had resigned voluntarily and not due to the book's publication. However, Hager said he was sceptical about the reasons behind Ede's departure:

Jason Ede disappeared during the last five-and-a-half weeks of the election campaign but it's pretty obvious that he was given a free holiday or something to get him out of the way, and then he was resigned out of a job rather than facing up to the issues ... I think there's a connection between being caught out so comprehensively and his sudden departure.

=== Inspector General inquiry into the release of SIS information ===
On 1 September, the Inspector-General of Intelligence and Security, Cheryl Gwyn, announced she would conduct an "in-depth and robust inquiry" in response to claims that details of a briefing between the head of the SIS with former Labour leader Phil Goff were given to Cameron Slater. Gwyn promised a comprehensive investigation saying: "The scale of the inquiry is significant – it involves access to a variety of IT systems, documents, phone records and so forth. I then need to analyse that information, discard what is irrelevant, and then take into account the evidence from those summoned." She said the inquiry was in "recognition of public interest" that the SIS may have been used for political purposes.

The results on the inquiry were released on 25 November 2014 three months later. Ms Gwyn found that the SIS gave information to John Key's office from where his deputy chief of staff Phil de Joux passed it on to another John Key employee, Jason Ede. Mr Ede contacted Cameron Slater and they then discussed how an Official Information Act request for the information should be worded. Slater emailed the request while they were still talking on the phone and also provided Slater with draft blog posts attacking Mr Goff. Cameron Slater subsequently used the information to attack former Labour leader, Phil Goff, on his blog.

Ms Gwyn concluded that former SIS director Warren Tucker provided "incomplete, inaccurate and misleading information" to Cameron Slater and to Prime Minister John Key and failed to take adequate steps to maintain the agency's political neutrality. In the process, Ms Gwyn said "the SIS had effectively delivered Mr Slater an exclusive story while denying other media the same information."

The report went on to say that Warren Tucker "having released inaccurate information that was predictably misinterpreted, the then director of the service had a responsibility to take positive steps to correct the interpretation", but failed to do so. Gwyn further said that "These errors resulted in misplaced criticism of the then-Leader of the Opposition, Hon Phil Goff MP". Ms Gwyn recommended that current SIS director, Rebecca Kittredge should apologise to Mr Goff on behalf of the SIS. After reading the report, Ms Kitteridge went a step further and apologised to the new Labour leader, Andrew Little, and Prime Minister John Key as well.

In a blog post responding to the release of the inquiry's findings, Hager wrote that:

John Key claimed at the time of the [Goff–SIS] incident ... that his staff were not involved in tipping off ... Slater about the SIS information. Key made the same claim again when my book was published. The IG found [today] that Key's staff had indeed been centrally involved in this abuse of government power.

He finishes his blog post by noting that many of the other components of Dirty Politics have yet to be investigated fully:

The Goff-SIS briefing was only one of many stories in the book. The difference here is that the Inspector-General has strong investigative powers and was willing to continue her review despite resistance from the PM's office. Other stories concerning Slater, Ede and PM's office attack operations, and their influence on election, still await being addressed by official or parliamentary inquiries.

=== Inquiry into Collins & SFO ===
There were also calls for a wide ranging inquiry into the National party's dealings with Cameron Slater. Labour's finance spokesman, David Parker, described the revelations in Dirty Politics as "just the tip of the iceberg" and laid a formal complaint with Police into allegations that Judith Collins perverted the course of justice. David Cunliffe said there should be a commission of inquiry into all National Ministers' dealings with Slater. Greens Party co-leader Metiria Turei said there should be a Royal Commission. Winston Peters said a full Royal Commission of Inquiry would be a bottom line in any negotiations by New Zealand First in the formation of a government after the election.

The Prime Minister agreed to an inquiry but limited its scope to only one issue – the allegations that Collins undermined the Director of the Serious Fraud Office, Adam Feeley in 2011. He appointed former High Court judge Lester Chisholm to conduct the inquiry. David Cunliffe felt this was an inadequate response and said Labour should be consulted on the terms of reference for the inquiry: "There is a well embedded constitutional convention that requires the Prime Minister to consult with the leader of the opposition this close to an election on a matter this serious. I would expect to be consulted on the terms of reference." Key refused to consult Labour over the terms saying "We're not going on a witch hunt."

On 25 November 2014, the inquiry released its findings that although there were two independent efforts to undermine former Serious Fraud Office chief Executive Adam Feeley, there was no evidence that Collins participated. However, Judge Chisholm had quite limited access to Slater's accomplices or to relevant information. He only interviewed two of the five people who were party to the email that led to Ms Collins' resignation – Cameron Slater and Carrick Graham. He didn't talk to Hanover boss Mark Hotchin or Hong Kong-based blogger Cathy Odgers. Chisholm also had no access to Ms Collins' Facebook communications which she deleted in 2013. He also did not have access to her parliamentary landline calls or to cell phone calls from Slater to her. Justice Chisholm noted that "The absence of telephone records for Mr Slater's calls is surprising given that both Ms Collins and Mr Slater confirmed that they phoned each other often."

Nevertheless, Collins felt vindicated and said:

"I actually feel that this chapter of having to deal with these allegations is now closed. And I feel very firmly that I acted appropriately and within my ministerial responsibilities, so I'm very pleased that the inquiry has been so full ... and I feel pleased with the result."

In regards to Collins' relationship with Cameron Slater, she said he remained a "family friend", although she felt "incredibly let down" by him.

=== On opinion polls prior to the 2014 election ===
Although it was difficult to gauge the New Zealand public's views on the contents of Dirty Politics, Television New Zealand's Vote Compass tool provided a rough indication. Based on over 13,000 responses up to 25 August 2014, Vote Compass suggests that 33% thought there was "none" or "little" truth to the claims in the book, 49% said there "some" or "a lot" of truth, and 18% didn't know. In terms of the effect of the book on voting intentions, 56% said it wouldn't have an effect, 15% said it would have a "little" effect, 11% "some", 10% "a lot", and 8% said they didn't know. There is also some evidence to suggest that the number of people who believed the book's claims had grown over time.

A number of polls were held during the intense publicity surrounding Dirty Politics and showed the National Party losing support. Towards the end of August 2014, two weeks after the release of the book, National was still way ahead at 50.8%, but down 4.3% on previous figures. John Key also lost ground as preferred prime minister. The Radio New Zealand Poll of Polls (an arithmetical average of the four most recent major polls) showed National had slid below 50% to 49.1% as at 29 August.

The Prime Minister frequently tried to deflect media interest from Dirty Politics arguing that most people were more interested in other election issues. Once Judith Collins resigned, three polls including the Herald DigiPoll survey, all showed National support had gone back up to 50% while Labour continued to drop. At his first campaign appearance in the Epsom electorate on 6 September, Key said the polls were showing the public had moved on. New Zealand Herald columnist John Armstrong noted that Collins was pushed into resigning and said: "When Key sacked Judith Collins, the headlines screamed 'National in chaos'. In fact, removing Collins was the vital first move in getting National's campaign back on track. Hager's book looks like having no material impact on the outcome of the election."

=== On the 2014 election ===
John Key's National Party was re-elected to government after it received 47.04% of the party vote in the September 2014 general election. Judith Collins retained her seat in Papakura, but her winning margin over the Labour candidate was cut by half – from 9890 in the 2011 election to 5,119 in 2014. After the election, Collins was not reinstated to a ministerial position, and was relegated to the backbenches.

Political journalist Andrea Vance commented that "Dirty Politics didn't hurt National – in fact, all the evidence points to a lift. But it did harm Labour." Labour leader David Cunliffe commented that the focus on Dirty Politics and spying on New Zealanders had actually hurt the left: "You would think the impact would be on the Government party responsible, but the reality is that if one is not able to get the airtime because others are dominating it, that impacts the opposition as well". Cameron Slater blogged that Dirty Politics had no impact on the election "because New Zealanders simply don't care".

=== On John Key's integrity ===
Throughout the weeks that the allegations of Dirty Politics swirled in the media, Prime Minister John Key tried to swat them away claiming Nicky Hager was little more than "a screaming left-wing conspiracy theorist". After National won the 2014 election, Key continued with this dismissive approach once MPs returned to Parliament. When asked by Green party leader, Russel Norman, how many times he had spoken to or texted Cameron Slater, Key replied "Never in my capacity as Prime Minister". An editorial in the New Zealand Herald said this "revealed a cavalier disregard for the accountability and integrity of his office." After Key denied Judith Collins the right to be called the 'Honourable', despite other Cabinet members resigning in disgrace and keeping the title, even Cameron Slater thought this reflected badly on Mr Key. Describing Mr Key's decision as a 'silly mistake' he said: "Starting off the term with an arrogant and petulant act like that is unbecoming and foreshadows ill-will dogging him in this term."

Key's integrity took another hit after release of the report by Inspector-General of Intelligence and Security Cheryl Gwyn into the release of information by SIS director, Warren Tucker. Despite the revelations in Gwyn's report, Key claimed no one in his office had done anything wrong and refused to apologise to Mr Goff. New Zealand Herald columnist John Armstrong described the report as "hugely embarrassing" and said: "The Key administration has plumbed new depths of arrogance and contempt for the notion of politicians being accountable for their actions". Fairfax political journalist Andrea Vance wrote in response to the inquiries' findings that Key takes "hands-off to a disturbing extreme". She further wrote: "It stretches credibility to suggest Key – and his chief of staff Wayne Eagleson – bear no responsibility for the conduct of de Joux and Ede."

A few days later, Mr Key had to admit in Parliament that he had been communicating with Cameron Slater by text about Gwyn's report prior to its release. Given that Slater is perceived, in John Armstrong's words, as "the second most-despised figure in New Zealand politics" (after Kim Dotcom), parliamentarians and media commentators were surprised that Key was still in touch with him. Armstrong said by acknowledging his links with Slater, Key "compromised his assurance that he had no knowledge of the dirty tricks operation". Bryce Edwards said that Key could not afford to cut ties with Slater "out of fear of what could happen if Slater became his enemy". Matthew Hooten said this could lead to John Key's 'downfall' as he "risks Cameron Slater going off the deep-end and revealing the full extent of his relationship with the Prime Minister himself, the Prime Minister's Office, with a number of John Key's ministers, with a fair bunch of the backbenchers, and with some senior party officials".

=== On democracy & perceptions of corruption ===
In his column in the New Zealand Herald, Dr Bryce Edwards, lecturer in political studies at Otago University, expressed concern about the impact of Dirty Politics on the public's confidence in public institutions and the integrity of governance. He said the official reports in response to the inquiries generated by the book should serve as a "wake-up call" about the health of New Zealand democratic process. In the National Business Review, Rob Hosking, supports this view writing: "The plain fact is, the country's security service got caught up in the political games of election 2011. Willfully or accidentally, it became a political arm of the party in power and not, as it should be, a neutral government agency."

In his column, Vernon Small warns that spindoctors are acquiring too much political sway and see their main job as being to protect the Government from the Opposition.

=== On science and public health ===
Obesity expert, Dr Boyd Swinburn, Professor of Population Nutrition and Global Health at the University of Auckland, says dirty politics and conflicts of interest in government appointments are having a detrimental impact on Public health. Swinburn said when Tony Ryall appointed former National MP Katherine Rich to the Health Promotion Agency (HPA) in 2012, he ignored an 'irreconcilable conflict of interest' – Rich is chief executive of the Food and Grocery Council, which lobbies for the alcohol, tobacco and grocery-food industries, whereas the primary responsibility of the HPA is to improve the health of New Zealanders.

Dr Swinburn also believes the views of scientists are being suppressed by attack campaigns driven by large commercial interests in New Zealand. He points to Tony Ryall's dismissal of a letter from more than 30 senior public-health experts calling for an investigation of Rich's role on the HPA board.

=== Police investigation into the identity of the hacker ===
==== Raid on Hager's home ====
In October 2014, five police officers went to Nicky Hager's home with a search warrant and spent ten hours looking for information. The alleged purpose of the search was to try to find out the identity of the hacker Rawshark, who hacked into Cameron Slater's computer to obtain the emails and other material on which Dirty Politics was based. They took away computers, hard-drives, phones, CDs, an iPod and a camera. Police told Hager he is a witness, rather than a suspect of the inquiry. Hager said: "It seems like a very strange level of resources just for a witness." Stuff noted that similar raids had not been made on National Party staffer, Jason Ede, who allegedly hacked into the Labour Party website.

==== Successful legal challenge of raid ====
In response to the police search, a legal defence fundraiser for Hager was set up on the website Give A Little by former Young Labour leader Meg Bates, who described Hager as a "hero" who "exposed a twisted web of power and influence in New Zealand politics". As at April 2016, over $65,000 had been donated to the fund, despite attempts to shut it down and criticism from Slater's sympathisers.

Another legal defence fundraiser was set up by the Freedom of the Press Foundation. In an article publicising the fundraiser at The Intercept and detailing the police raid on Hager's house, Glenn Greenwald and Ryan Gallagher wrote that the raid could have been partially motivated by a desire to investigate whether Hager had received any information from the NSA leaks. As at 18 November, the Foundation fundraiser had raised over $21,000.

A legal team led by Julian Miles QC, media lawyer Steven Price, and barrister Felix Geiringer gathered round Nicky Hager, who is seeking a judicial review of the police action. Steven Price said "Our case will be that the police didn't properly consider Nicky Hager's right to protect his confidential sources". Commenting on the case, law professor Ursula Cheer said: "We've never really had a case like this before and we've never really had any of these (public interest) issues tested."

On 30 October 2014, it was reported that an updated edition of John Roughan's biography John Key: Portrait of a Prime Minister had a new chapter on the election which mentioned that John Key claimed to have been told the identity of the hacker Rawshark. He did not pass the name on to the author of the biography. Asked by reporters about the comment and whether he given the information to the police, a spokesperson for Key said that while he thought he knew the identity of the hacker, "he cannot be certain". The spokesperson also said that Key had no involvement in the police inquiry.

In December 2015, the High Court in Wellington declared the warrant used to search Hager's house "fundamentally unlawful". The judge criticised the police saying the way detectives went about obtaining the warrant was "not the type of facilitation that I consider the Search and Surveillance Act anticipates".

In March 2016, Hager travelled to the High Court in Auckland to collect belongings taken by police during the search in October 2014. His belongings were in a sealed container at the High Court awaiting the outcome of the legal challenge. Police also destroyed a hard drive which contained copies of Hager's data. Hager commented that:

I'm still gobsmacked that the police thought that it was reasonable to arrive like Rambo and spend 11 hours doing over my house where they found nothing they wanted.

It was completely and utterly over the top and it would've been depressing for everyone who works in this field if they'd got away with it.

I hope what this means is that people won't be more scared to be whistleblowers and more scared to be sources in the media.

On 12 June 2018, Hager accepted an apology and compensation for "substantial damages" from the New Zealand Police for the 2014 raid on his home during the investigation into the hacking that led to the Dirty Politics book. The settlement also included the police acknowledging that they had accessed Hager's personal banking data.

=== On the media ===
After the police raid on Nicky Hager's house, the Labour Party's acting leader, David Parker, pointed out that journalists have a right to protect their sources, and said there was a growing number of cases in which the police were being called in to investigate the media. He said the police had searched media offices after Mr Key's "teapot tapes" conversation with John Banks and the Serious Fraud Office had demanded the National Business Review hand over documents related to the collapse of South Canterbury Finance. Parker argued that the search of Nicky Hager's house amounted to intimidation and said: "If the media are not free of undue intrusion by state agencies, or have too cosy a relationship with political parties; they cannot do what the fourth estate is meant to do." In an editorial, the New Zealand Herald agreed and said the police raid over such a minor crime was "not a good look for the police". The editorial went on to say: "The effect of such raids is to intimidate such people from approaching media to disclose uncomfortable truths."

In reviews of political events in 2014, numerous commentators emphasised the impact of Dirty Politics. The New Zealand Herald's David Fisher named Nicky Hager as a finalist for New Zealander of the Year. Russell Brown said #dirtypolitics was "Word of the Year 2014". Martin Bradbury criticised John Key for his involvement with Cameron Slater but also took aim at the media for their part in dirty politics arguing that "many of these media outlets also worked hand in glove with National's black ops team." Andrew Geddis challenged the Sunday Star Times for giving Judith Collins a bi-weekly column (once she resigned from cabinet), arguing the paper was essentially choosing money over 'ethical concerns'. Reviewing these various commentaries, Bryce Edwards said: "There is a growing call for the so-called 'Dirty Politics cast' of politicians and activists to be shunned by the media."
