= Cameron Slater =

New Zealand-based blogger

- Occupation: Blogger
- Website: goodoil.news

Cameron Slater is a right-wing New Zealand-based blogger, best known for his role in Dirty Politics and publishing the Whale Oil Beef Hooked blog, which operated from 2005 until it closed in 2019. He edited the tabloid newspaper New Zealand Truth from November 2012 until it ceased publication in July 2013. Following the closure of WhaleOil in 2019, Slater launched a new political blog called the BFD, which was succeeded by The Good Oil in July 2024.

Slater's father, John Slater, served as President of the New Zealand National Party from 1998 to 2001. Slater believes in reforming the name-suppression laws in New Zealand. In late 2009 he gained notoriety for naming two high-profile sex offenders, and consequently became the first blogger in New Zealand to face charges for breaching a name-suppression order. In 2014 Nicky Hager's book Dirty Politics demonstrated Slater's close ties to Justice Minister Judith Collins and to Prime Minister John Key and speculated that Slater had been paid to write attack articles on public figures.

== Whale Oil ==
From 2005 to 2019, Slater ran the blog Whale Oil Beef Hooked, commonly known simply as WhaleOil. WhaleOil has been described by The Spinoff as "the most notorious publication of the digital media era in New Zealand". Whale Oil Beef Hooked (Blog) was sold to Matthew Blomfield after the company Social Media Consultants went into liquidation and Cameron Slater went Bankrupt Cameron Slater ordered to pay $475,000 to Matthew Blomfield for defamation, judge finds he facilitated ‘vendetta’

=== Challenges to name suppression laws ===
On 23 December 2009, Slater was charged with five counts of breaching name suppression orders. The charges related to two blog posts that contained pictures which revealed the identities of a prominent New Zealand entertainer and a former New Zealand Olympian who were each charged with sexual offences.

On 11 January 2010, Slater published a blog post that used binary and hexadecimal code to allege the identity of a former Member of Parliament charged with indecent assault on a 13-year-old girl. The Nelson Bays police announced that they would investigate this further breach of New Zealand's name suppression laws.

He pleaded not guilty to the five name suppression charges on 9 February 2010, and the same day revealed the identity of a prominent Palmerston North resident whose name was suppressed after being found guilty of possessing thousands of pornographic images of children. In August 2010 he went on trial, now facing ten charges of breaching suppression orders. In September he was convicted of nine of the charges, eight of breaching suppression orders for offenders and one of naming a victim in a sexual abuse case. He was fined $750 and ordered to pay court costs of $130 for each of the nine cases.

In May 2010, Slater published the name of a public servant who had permanent name suppression, after a Wellington District Court jury found him not guilty of assaulting his teenage son. The matter reignited the national debate over the internet and name suppression and the public servant's lawyer Mike Antunovic publicly labelled Slater a "renegade."

=== "Feral" controversy ===
On 27 January 2014, Slater published a brief post with the headline, "Feral dies in Greymouth, did world a favour". At the time of the headline, all that the media had reported was that one person had been killed when a car crashed at high speed into the bedroom of a house in Greymouth after ignoring Police. The article Slater wrote was about how the media had handled the coverage and had blamed the Police. The identity of the dead man was not known at that time.

The post led to objections from the general public and suspected hacking attempts on his blog site. Some people called on Slater for an apology to the young man's family at least. Slater moved his family in response to the threats, but refused to apologise. In lieu of an apology, Slater offered the following: "[W]here is it written in the rule books that you have to take into account people’s feelings?”

=== Visits to Kim Dotcom mansion controversy ===
In February 2014, Prime Minister John Key said in the media that Winston Peters had visited the Kim Dotcom mansion three times. This information turned out to be correct, and Peters publicly challenged Key to release the source of the information, suggesting that the Prime Minister had used spying agencies to track his movements. Key denied that spy agencies had been involved, and hinted that the source of the information was Cameron Slater. Key said that while he did not agree with everything Slater posted, he talked to the blogger "every so often" and had talked to him about Kim Dotcom and other things that week.

=== Matthew Blomfield complaint and defamation case ===
Matt Blomfield, a Hell's Pizza chain franchisee, made a criminal complaint against Cameron Slater. Blomfield also took a defamation case against Slater for comments Slater made about him on his blog. Slater was found in contempt of court in September 2015 and fined $1500 by Justice Raynor Asher.

Cameron Slater on 25 February 2019 announced via his blog he would be declaring bankruptcy due to the defamation claims against him that he has lost.

On 12 March 2019, the Director of Human Rights Proceedings ordered an award of $70,000 against Cameron Slater as well as a declaration of interference with privacy, a takedown order and restraining order.

On 21 February 2024, Slater and his defunct company Social Media Consultants Ltd were ordered to pay NZ$475,000 in damages to Blomfield. Justice David Johnstone found that Slater had facilitated a personal vendetta against Blomfield by using stolen documents to produce defamatory blog posts.

=== Dirty Politics controversy ===
The book Dirty Politics, written by Nicky Hager and based on correspondence hacked from Cameron Slater's computer, was published in August 2014. Two months later, the police raided Hager's house, seizing computers and other equipment looking for information to assist them find out who hacked the emails from Slater's computer.

The book discussed Slater's close friendship with Judith Collins, a senior Cabinet Minister in the National Party government led by Prime Minister John Key. Amongst other discussions of New Zealand politics, Hager wrote that Slater had found a database of Labour Party information on a public Labour Party website, and that with the help of Jason Ede – one of Key's press secretaries – Slater used the information to attack the Labour Party during the 2011 election campaign. On 30 August 2014, Collins resigned as a minister in the wake of an email suggesting that she had sought to undermine former Serious Fraud Office (SFO) Chief Executive Adam Feeley in league with Slater.

=== Legal troubles with Colin Craig, 2015–2018 ===
In June 2015, Cameron Slater published a love poem by the Conservative Party leader Colin Craig entitled "Two of Me" on his blog Whale Oil. This poem was linked to sexual harassment allegations involving Craig and the Conservative Party's former press secretary Rachel MacGregor. Due to the negative publicity and internal tensions within the Conservatives, Craig resigned as Party leader on 19 June 2015. Craig's resignation preceded an internal rift within the Conservatives between supporters and opponents of the former leader; which led to the aggrieved parties taking each other to court.

In response to Slater's actions, Craig filed a defamation suit against Slater and two other opponents, New Zealand Taxpayers' Union chairman Jordan Williams and former Conservative party board member John Stringer for NZ$650,000, NZ$300,000 and NZ$350,000 respectively. In addition, Craig also circulated a booklet, entitled "Dirty Politics and Hidden Agendas", which attacked Slater, Williams and Stringer and labelled them as part of the "Dirty Politics Brigade"; a reference to Nicky Hager's Dirty Politics book. Slater responded by slamming the mass circulation of the "Dirty Politics" booklet as a violating of postal rules around unsolicited mail.

On 24 November 2015, Colin Craig issued an email ultimatum to Slater; claiming copyright ownership over the poem "Two of Me" and demanding that the latter issue a retraction, written apology, and pay NZ$3,000 per month for displaying the poem on Whale Oil. The invoice amounted to a total of NZ$15,000. Slater responded by rejecting Craig's ultimatum and indicating that he was prepared to clash with Craig in court. On 3 April 2016, Craig tabled legal papers seeking more than NZ$13,000 in damages from Slater for publishing the poem on his blog.

In early May 2017, Slater counter-sued Craig, seeking more than NZ$16 million in damages. That same month, the Auckland High Court heard Craig's lawsuit against Slater. The judge reserved his decision on 1 June 2017. On 25 October 2018, Justice Kit Toogood ruled that Slater had defamed Craig by making untrue statements about him. However, he declined to award damages to Craig, stating that any reputational damage that Craig had suffered was the result of his own actions.

=== Awards ===
- NetGuide Best Blog Award 2013
- Canon Media Awards Blog of the Year 2014
- NetGuide Best Blog Award 2014

== The New Zealand Truth ==
At the end of October 2012, Slater was announced as the editor for tabloid newspaper the New Zealand Truth. He said in his new role he would be "kicking arse and sticking up for the little guy". His first issue was published in November 2012. The Truth ceased production less than a year later, in July 2013.

== The BFD/The Good Oil ==
Following the closure of WhaleOil in 2019, Slater launched the BFD, a new blog publishing similar content to WhaleOil. In July 2024, the BFD was revamped as The Good Oil.

=== Alleged Siouxsie Wiles lockdown violations ===
In early September 2021, Slater published a video and article on his blog BFD showing microbiologist and science communicator Siouxsie Wiles allegedly flouting COVID-19 lockdown restrictions by socialising with a friend in an Auckland beach during the Delta variant community outbreak. The story and video was circulated among other right-wing New Zealand blogs. In response, Wiles clarified that her visit was within the rules, as her friend was part of the same bubble as her and the pair had cycled 5 km from her house to the beach. However Wiles did acknowledge that her friend had broken the "do not go swimming" rule and that she should have stopped her. She also accused Slater of spreading disinformation in order to discredit her due to her role in advising the Government's COVID-19 response.

== Reality Check Radio ==
By 2024 Slater had become a host on the contrarian internet radio station Reality Check Radio, which was launched by anti-vaccination group Voices for Freedom in 2023. He interviewed New Zealand First leader Winston Peters. In mid-April 2024, Slater and fellow host Paul Brennan analysed a cabinet reshuffle within the Sixth National Government.

== Personal life ==
On the weekend of 29–30 May 2010, Slater and his wife sold their home after their income insurance provider, Fidelity Insurance, stopped payments for depression. His wife said that Slater has been living with clinical depression following the failure of a business he part-owned, and has "...no thought of the consequences for himself or others or indeed his family".

Slater attends meetings at a Seventh-day Adventist Church. Despite a long history with the National Party, he claims not to be a member of any political party.

In October 2018, Slater suffered two strokes which left him partially paralysed on the right side of his body, and with speech and vision impairments.

In late March 2024, Slater was embroiled in an online argument with broadcaster and The Platform co-founder Sean Plunket. After the Lyttelton leg of the 2024 New Zealand Sail Grand Prix was postponed due to the sighting of a Hector's dolphin, Plunket said on The Platform that Hector's dolphins were "like the down syndrome kids of marine mammals. They're cross-bred and they deserve to die." Slater disagreed with Plunket, calling him a "pig" in a Tweet. Plunket responded with several Tweets saying that Slater's parents were first cousins and calling him "dolphin boy." Plunket subsequently apologised for his inflammatory language and for insulting people with down syndrome. In response, Slater questioned the sincerity of Plunket's apology and condemned his demonisation of Hector's dolphins and personal attacks against him.
