= The Hollow Men (book) =

2006 book by Nicky Hager

The Hollow Men: A Study in the Politics of Deception
- Author: Nicky Hager
- Language: English
- Genre: Politics
- Publisher: Craig Potton Publishing
- Publication date: 2006
- Pages: 351pp (paperback)
- ISBN: 1-877333-62-X
- OCLC: 105538523
- Dewey Decimal: 324.29304 22
- LC Class: JQ5892 .H34 2006

The Hollow Men is a 2006 book written by Nicky Hager about the election strategies used by the New Zealand National Party during New Zealand's 2005 general election. The book has been adapted into a stage play, and filmed as a documentary.

In 2026, it was retrospectively considered the first part of Hager's "Dirty Politics trilogy", alongside 2014's Dirty Politics and 2026's Dirty Work.

== Background ==
The Hollow Men is based on a wide range of internal party documents, including emails, which Hager stated were leaked to him by six National Party insiders. The documents and emails were written by then party leader Don Brash, and a wide range of people associated with him. The book was initially prevented from being published when Brash obtained an injunction preventing anyone from publishing material from emails that he had written. At the time he was unaware that Hager had completed the book and was about to launch it. Brash claims that the emails were stolen. However, on 23 November 2006, Brash announced his resignation from the leadership of the National Party. The following day he had the injunction lifted, allowing the book to be released. Political scientist Raymond Miller wrote that, "Had he not resigned, he would not have survived the fallout from this book's release."

== Content ==
The book describes Brash's rise to power in the New Zealand National Party as being assisted by an "informal network of people from the right of New Zealand politics", including a number of ACT members, and alleges the funding of the National Party in the 2005 election was mainly from prominent New Zealand businessmen through blind trusts. It also documents that senior National Party figures, including Brash, knew of the Plymouth Brethren Christian Church's pamphlet campaigns in May 2005, although Brash denied any knowledge of this until August. The book showed that even Brash's admissions in August 2005 were inaccurate, making his resignation inevitable.

The heart of the book is its descriptions of the National Party strategy discussions and the techniques the party advisers used to try to win the 2005 national elections. The thinking behind major speeches, media management, election advertising and election messages is shown in the participants' own words. Many of the party's previously anonymous major donors are identified and relations with them are documented.

== Response from Don Brash ==
Brash responded to the book saying that it was a "shoddy work of fiction" and a "tissue of lies". In particular, he denied receiving a crucial e-mail on 25 May 2005 that spelt out the Plymouth Brethren Christian Church's election plans and their co-operation with the National Party. He said: "I have no record of receiving that email. It is either total fiction or it was sent to one of the three other email addresses which I don't personally receive." Brash stated that as he wasn't aware of the email he had not "knowingly misled" the public on the matter. However, Hager's book also detailed that, on the same day as the Plymouth Brethren Christian Church's letter was sent, Brash had sent another email in which he discussed the possibility of other groups funding "parallel campaigns" that would benefit the National Party. Brash wrote: "I guess the stuff which the Brethren is doing is one example".

Brash wrote a response to the book in December 2006 that claimed to show "dozens of factual errors, some of no great significance but others of much greater importance". In particular, he identified "the allegation that taxpayers' money was used to pay for a pamphlet promoting a fair tax regime for the racing industry; it was not." It was, he wrote, an example of an error caused by "having access to only part of an internal discussion." In response Hager wrote that "out of a 350-page book, with nearly 1000 detailed references, Don Brash has found two minor inaccuracies. I am happy to take his word about both of them. But neither detracts from the book." Brash's insistence that the pamphlet had not been paid for with taxpayers funds ignored that it had been prepared by Parliamentary staff, which is also a breach of the parliamentary rules.

== Police investigation ==
Police investigated the theft of Brash's emails but in May 2009 columnist Fran O'Sullivan described it as a "farce" as police "thumbed their nose" at Brash by assigning an inept police officer who made a merely cursory investigation of "what was obviously a politically motivated burglary." An internal review of the original investigation was conducted by the New Zealand Police as a result of complaints lodged by Brash. The review concluded that the investigation was competently performed and the results correct, but was critical of some delays in reporting the results of the investigation to Brash.

== Adaptations ==
The Hollow Men
- John Key and Don Brash
- Directed by: Alister Barry
- Written by: Nicky Hager
- Narrated by: Nick Blake
- Edited by: Abi King-Jones
- Music by: David Long
- Distributed by: Community Media Trust
- Release date: July 2008
- Country: New Zealand
- Language: English

In 2007, Dean Parker adapted it into a stage play that was directed by Jonathon Hendry. It was also filmed by Alister Barry as feature-length documentary that was shown to a sell-out audience at the Wellington Film Festival on 20 July 2008.
