= David P. Schmitt =

American psychologist

- Education: University of Michigan
- Scientific career
- Fields: Psychologist, educator, and author
- Workplaces: Bradley University
- Thesis: Ph.D. in Personality Psychology

David P. Schmitt is a personality psychologist who founded the International Sexuality Description Project (ISDP). The ISDP is the largest-ever cross-cultural research study on sex and personality. Over 100 psychologists simultaneously administered an anonymous self-report survey to 17,837 individuals representing 56 different nations, 6 continents, 13 islands, and 30 languages. Direct assessments of people's personality traits and sexual behaviors have led to innovative tests of evolutionary psychology and social role theory. A second wave of the ISDP is currently underway and includes measures of subjective well-being, social dominance, sexual aggression, rape attitudes, HIV risk, and psychopathy.

David Schmitt spent most of his career at Bradley University in Peoria, Illinois. He also held faculty positions at Brunel University of London and Kansas State University, and he is currently at Oklahoma State University where he chairs the Psychology Department.

Schmitt blogs in Psychology Today.

== Publications ==
- Schmitt, D.P. (2005). Sociosexuality from Argentina to Zimbabwe: A 48-nation study of sex, culture, and strategies of human mating. Behavioral and Brain Sciences, 28, 247–311.
- Schmitt, D.P., Alcalay, L., Allensworth, M., Allik, J., Ault, L., Austers, I., et al. (2004). Patterns and universals of adult romantic attachment across 62 cultural regions: Are models of self and of other pancultural constructs? Journal of Cross-Cultural Psychology, 35, 367–402.
- Schmitt, D.P., Alcalay, L., Allik, J., Angleiter, A., Ault, L., Austers, I., et al. (2004). Patterns and universals of mate poaching across 53 nations: The effects of sex, culture, and personality on romantically attracting another person's partner. Journal of Personality and Social Psychology, 86, 560–584.
- Schmitt, D., et al. (2003). Universal sex differences in the desire for sexual variety: Tests from 52 nations, 6 continents, and 13 islands. Journal of Personality and Social Psychology, 85, 85–104.
- Schmitt, D.P, Shackelford, T.K., Duntely, J., Tooke, W., Buss, D.M., Fisher, M.L., Lavallee, M., & Vasey, P. (2002). Is there an early-30s peak in female sexual desire? Cross-sectional evidence from the United States and Canada. The Canadian Journal of Human Sexuality, 11, 1–18.
