= 1999 New Zealand justice referendum =

- 27 November 1999
- "Should there be a reform of our justice system placing greater emphasis on the needs of victims, providing restitution and compensation for them and imposing minimum sentences and hard labour for all serious violent offences?"

Results
Choice	Votes	%
Yes	1,886,705	91.75%
No	169,699	8.25%
Valid votes	2,056,404	98.90%
Invalid or blank votes	22,849	1.10%
Total votes	2,079,253	100.00%
Registered voters/turnout	2,509,365	82.86%

A citizens initiated referendum was held in New Zealand on 27 November 1999, based on the question:

Should there be a reform of our justice system placing greater emphasis on the needs of victims, providing restitution and compensation for them and imposing minimum sentences and hard labour for all serious violent offences?

The referendum saw changes to law such as the Bail Act 2000, which made it harder to be able to be granted bail which meant more individuals would have to await trail in remand prisons.

The referendum also saw adaptions to the Victims Rights Act 2002 and the implementation of victim impact statements to be read in court.

Additionally, the Parole Act 2002 made it harder for inmates to apply for parole and leave prison early.

== Results ==
Electorate	Yes ✓		No ✗		Total valid votes	Informal votes	Total votes counted	Electors on Roll	Turnout
Total	91.75%	1,886,705	8.25%	169,699	2,056,404	22,849	2,079,253	2,509,365	82.86%
Albany	93.17%	31,959	6.83%	2,341	34,300	307	34,607	41,815	82.76%
Aoraki	94.18%	32,026	5.82%	1,980	34,006	334	34,340	39,665	86.58%
Auckland Central	83.56%	26,116	16.44%	5,138	31,254	642	31,896	39,934	79.87%
Banks Peninsula	89.20%	33,305	10.80%	4,034	37,339	399	37,738	42,584	88.62%
Bay of Plenty	95.05%	32,786	4.95%	1,709	34,495	262	34,757	41,630	83.49%
Christchurch Central	88.69%	28,727	11.31%	3,664	32,391	405	32,796	40,083	81.82%
Christchurch East	93.36%	30,073	6.64%	2,138	32,211	243	32,454	38,061	85.27%
Clutha-Southland	94.71%	29,056	5.29%	1,622	30,678	259	30,937	37,167	83.24%
Coromandel	94.11	32,496	5.89%	2,034	34,530	367	34,897	40,278	86.64%
Dunedin North	87.62%	27,252	12.38%	3,850	31,102	482	31,584	36,885	85.63%
Dunedin South	92.61%	33,125	7.39%	2,643	35,768	316	36,084	41,686	86.56%
Total	91.75%	1,886,705	8.25%	169,699	2,056,404	22,849	2,079,253	2,509,365	82.86%
