= Alan Preston =

New Zealand cricketer and footballer

Personal information
- Full name: Alan Herbert Preston
- Date of birth: 29 October 1932
- Place of birth: Wellington, New Zealand
- Date of death: 2 September 2004 (aged 71)
- Place of death: Wellington, New Zealand
- Position: Forward

Senior career*
| Years | Team | Apps | (Gls) |
- Victoria University

International career
| | New Zealand | 3 | (0) |
- * Club domestic league appearances and goals

Alan Herbert Preston (29 October 1932 – 2 September 2004) was a New Zealand football (soccer) player and cricketer who represented the New Zealand national football team and played 38 first-class matches for Wellington and two for the North Island.

== Football ==
Preston made his full All Whites debut in a 2–1 win over Australia on 14 August 1954 and played twice over the next two weeks against the same opposition, losing both 1–4.

== Cricket ==
Alan Preston
Cricket information
- Batting: Right-handed
- Bowling: Right-arm medium

Domestic team information
- Years: Team
- 1955/56–1962/63: Wellington

Career statistics
| Competition | FC |
|---|---|
| Matches | 40 |
| Runs scored | 1,448 |
| Batting average | 24.54 |
| 100s/50s | 1/8 |
| Top score | 122 |
| Balls bowled | 2,740 |
| Wickets | 32 |
| Bowling average | 34.46 |
| 5 wickets in innings | 0 |
| 10 wickets in match | 0 |
| Best bowling | 3/32 |
| Catches/stumpings | 30/– |
- Source: CricketArchive, 9 September 2009

A right-hand batsman and right-arm medium-pace bowler, Preston played 38 matches for Wellington, and two for a North Island XI against the South Island XI, between 1955 and 1963. He averaged 24.54 runs in 69 innings, with a highest score of 122 in Wellington's victory over Northern Districts in 1956–57, and had career-best bowling figures of 3 for 32. In early 1959, the cricket correspondent of The Press described him as "a plucky batsman and a magnificent field" and said he was unlucky to miss Test selection.
