= Timberlands West Coast Limited =

- Predecessor: New Zealand Forest Service
- Defunct: 31 December 2008
- Successor: Crown Forestry (division of MAF)
- Headquarters: West Coast, New Zealand

Timberlands West Coast Limited was a New Zealand State-owned enterprise based on the West Coast.

It was formed to manage the native and exotic forests on the West Coast of the defunct New Zealand Forest Service.

A large quantity of internal documents relating to the operation of its secret public relations campaign to support its logging operations in the 1990s against environmental groups was published in the book Secrets and Lies in 1999.

In 2001, 130,000 ha of indigenous forests were transferred to the Department of Conservation.

In February 2008, the Minister of State-Owned Enterprises Trevor Mallard announced that the assets of Timberlands will transfer to Crown Forestry (division of MAF) since the company has had poor financial results. The company ceased trading on 31 December 2008 and once the transfer of forests was completed, the company was wound up.
