= New Zealand Taxpayers' Union =

Taxpayer pressure group

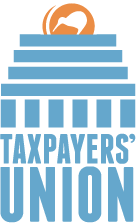
- Logo of the Taxpayers' Union
- Abbreviation: NZTU
- Formation: October 2013
- Type: Pressure group
- Legal status: Incorporated society
- Headquarters: Wellington
- Executive Director: Jordan Williams
- Budget: $3 million+ per year
- Staff: 18 (2023)
- Website: www.taxpayers.org.nz

The New Zealand Taxpayers' Union (NZTU) is a taxpayer pressure group founded in 2013 to scrutinise government spending, publicise government waste, and promote an efficient tax system. The union was founded among conservative figures, and is often regarded as a right-wing pressure group.

== Leadership ==
The New Zealand Taxpayers' Union was founded on 30 October 2013. The group was first chaired for four years by John Bishop, a former Television New Zealand political editor, and father of National Party list MP Chris Bishop. He was succeeded by Barrie Saunders, who held the chair for three years from 2017 to 2021. Ashley Church, a director of the Israel Institute of New Zealand and a former CEO of the Property Institute of New Zealand, was invited onto the Board in 2020 and became its chairperson in 2021, but stepped down after five months.

The group's co-founder and executive director is Wellington lawyer Jordan Williams. Williams is known for fronting the 'Vote for Change' campaign during the 2011 referendum on New Zealand's voting system. Williams previously worked at the law firm of former ACT MP Stephen Franks. Williams was involved in a series of lawsuits over defamation with the then leader of the Conservative Party of New Zealand Colin Craig. In 2019 Williams apologised to Craig for defamation and Williams dropped his counter-suit.

David Farrar co-founded the group and was a board member for ten years, resigning in July 2023. Farrar describes himself as "very pro economic liberalism", and has stated that the Taxpayers' Union is not "anti-left or right", and "I suspect we will somewhat annoy whoever is in government at the time".

== Activities ==
The Taxpayers' Union initiatives include public relations campaigns and paid advertising. Campaigns are intended to generate media interest and greater public involvement and support for fiscally conservative causes.

Its major campaigns have included reports on corporate welfare by the John Key-led government, commissioning independent costings of the election promises of all the major political parties during the 2014 election, and league tables comparing the performance of local government organisations.

In January 2014, the group released internal ACC documents suggesting that $19 million awarded to the New Zealand Council of Trade Unions and Business New Zealand to provide a workplace health and safety training programme had been wasted. Soon afterward the scheme was scrapped.

In June 2014 the group partnered with Fairfax Media to produce local government league tables, labelled "The Ratepayers' Report".

The group operates a confidential 'tip line' for members of the public and government officials to report examples of government waste.

The Auckland Ratepayers' Alliance describes itself as a "Taxpayers' Union supported project". Its activities, which focus on Auckland Council rates and spending, were folded into the Taxpayers' Union in 2021. Before then, it had been a company founded (in 2015) and directed by Jordan Williams, registered at the Taxpayers' Union Wellington address. In the year to 30 June 2017, the Taxpayers' Union was responsible for 5.4% of all the official information requests received by Auckland Council. The council estimated that to respond to all 64 requests cost $39,100.

Between 2021 and 2023, the Taxpayers' Union opposed the Sixth Labour Government's Three Waters and co-governance policies.

In 2024 a Taxpayers' Union representative travelled to Panama to oppose the 10th conference of parties to the WHO Framework Convention on Tobacco Control. A group of taxpayer groups from around the world gathered with the aim of preventing increased prohibition of vaping.

During the 2025 New Zealand local elections, the Taxpayers Union released its "Ratepayers Protection Pledge" for mayoral and council candidates to sign. The three-point pledge stated that signatories would oppose any increases to council rates and levies, support measures to improve transparency of council expenditure and oppose unelected appointments to council committees with spending and regulatory powers. In early September 2025, several Dunedin mayoral candidates including Marie Laufiso, Future Dunedin leader Andrew Simms and Green candidate Mickey Treadwell accused the Taxpayers' Union of bullying candidates and breaching impartiality rules. In response, the Taxpayers Union's head of communications Tony Relf rejected accusations of bullying, and claimed that the public supported a rates cap.

In December 2025, the Taxpayers' Union launched a pressure campaign attacking the financial management record of Finance Minister Nicola Willis, alleging that government spending exceeded the previous Sixth Labour government. The union released packaged fudge titled "Nicola Fudge Co.," with an image of Willis with the slogan "A treat today - A tax tomorrow." On 9 December, Willis challenged the organisation's chair Ruth Richardson, who served as Finance Minister in the Fourth National Government, to a debate in Parliament on the Government's financial management. In response, Richardson defended her group's pressure campaign, stating that they were holding Willis to account for the country's structural fiscal deficit. Following disagreements about the host and venue for the debate, Richardson pulled out of the debate on 16 December, stating the she would not be a "party to a circus or a sideshow designed to distract from fiscal failure." In response, Willis accused the Taxpayers' Union of being unwilling to show up for the debate and defended the Government's financial management.

=== Networking ===
Executive Director Jordan Williams attended an Atlas Network training session in 2015, and later received a fellowship grant from Atlas in 2018 to support the growth of the Taxpayers' Union. As of 2020, the Taxpayers Union is an official partner of the Atlas Network, alongside the New Zealand Initiative think-tank. According to Jordan Williams, the Atlas Network has accounted for up to one or two percent of its budget including awards and travel scholarships.

The Taxpayers' Union shares a close relationship with the New Zealand Free Speech Union (FSU). Jordan Williams founded the FSU's predecessor, and both the Taxpayers' Union and FSU's offices are located next to each other.

== Controversies ==
=== Use of false identities ===
In October 2018, The New Zealand Herald revealed the results of an investigation into the Taxpayers' Union, showing that staff members acting on behalf of the organisation (and in an organised campaign) assumed false identities to lodge Official Information Act requests with the New Zealand Government's science research agency. After refusing to comment for two days, representatives from the union admitted they had used false identities in this way. The Herald investigation found that all of the email accounts used for the requests were linked to one particular email address of a Taxpayers' Union staff member by way of account recovery processes.

The union claimed the reason for the use of the email accounts was to successfully obtain information from the science agency Callaghan Innovation, which they said "de-prioritised" requests from them, and defended its actions as justified and in the public interest. However, in the interview with Guyon Espiner where Union head Jordan Williams made that claim, and also claimed that the information came from "within Callaghan Innovation", he provided no supporting evidence for either claim. During the response segment of the same interview, chair of Callaghan Innovation Pete Hodgson pointed out that in the year ending June 2018 Callaghan Innovation received 26 requests they knew to be from the union, and 14 they suspected were from the union but that did not use the union's name. All of these were responded to within the legal time limits. Hodgson pointed out that Callaghan met these legal time limits 94% of the time for general requests in the same year, so the union received slightly better service than New Zealand as a whole.

In response to a direct question from Espiner about whether Callaghan had ever stalled the Taxpayer's Union on a request they had made, Hodgson responded "No the opposite, we met the request on every occasion at some considerable expense. Our running cost for this...is just over $103,000. There has been a huge effort by Callaghan to respond to this blizzard of requests and it's all been done within the legal time."

=== Promotion of the use of nicotine products ===
The union has regularly opposed tobacco control measures and launched a campaign called "Clear The Air" to promote the use of e-cigarettes. They have been accused of "echoing tobacco industry arguments", and have had previous financial donations from British American Tobacco.

== See also ==
- Dirty Work: The Taxpayers' Union and New Zealand's Hard Right
