= West Coast Accord =

The West Coast Accord was an agreement signed on 6 November 1986 between government, industry and environmental organisations concerning the forests of the West Coast of New Zealand.

The major focus of the Accord was for the sustainable yield of timber from the indigenous forests on the West Coast.

The signatories were:

- Minister for the Environment
- West Coast United Council
- Native Forest Action Council
- Royal Forest and Bird Protection Society of New Zealand
- Federated Mountain Clubs of New Zealand
- West Coast Timber Association
- Westland Timber Workers Union

It was cancelled on 15 May 2000 by the Forests (West Coast Accord) Act 2000. From 31 March 2002 the forests in public ownership were no longer logged and were reclassified for conservation purposes.

The Accord was doomed to failure since there were conflicting opinions between industry and environmental groups as to what constituted sustainable management of the forests.

== See also ==
- Forestry in New Zealand
