= Potton & Burton =

Independent publishing house in Nelson, New Zealand

- Founded: 1987; 38 years ago
- Founder: Craig Potton
- Country of origin: New Zealand
- Headquarters location: Nelson
- Distribution: Bateman Books
- Publication types: Books and calendars
- Official website: www.pottonandburton.co.nz

Potton & Burton, formerly Craig Potton Publishing, is a book publishing company based in Nelson, New Zealand, and is one of the largest independent book publishers in New Zealand.

== History ==
Potton & Burton was first established in 1987 as Craig Potton Publishing by conservationist Craig Potton, who initially founded it to publish books of his photography. It publishes a diverse range of non-fiction books focused on New Zealand, as well as a range of photographic calendars. Potton (born 1952) is a photographer and prominent environmentalist.

The company changed its name to Potton & Burton in March 2015, to more accurately reflect the role of Robbie Burton, who has been the publisher since 1990, and who has been a co-owner for many years. In 2019 the company out-sourced its sales and distribution to Bateman Books in Auckland, but continues to publish new books and calendars from its Nelson office, while also maintaining a strong backlist of New Zealand books.
