= 2026 New Zealand general election =

- 7 November 2026

All 131 seats in the House of Representatives, including 11 overhang seats 66 seats needed for a majority
- Opinion polls
- Votes counted: 85.90% as of 1:46 PM, 8 November 2026 NZDT
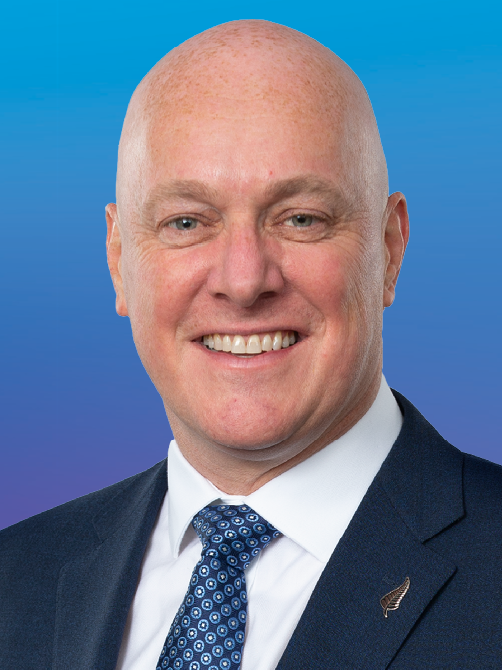

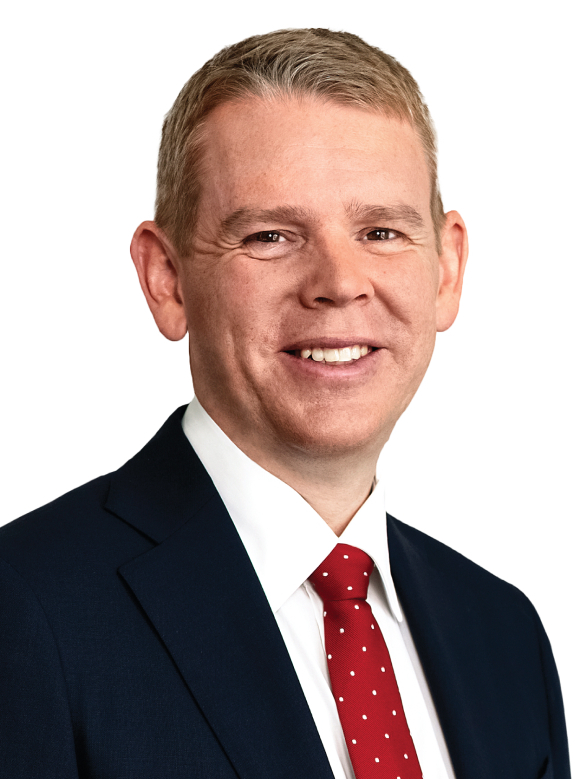

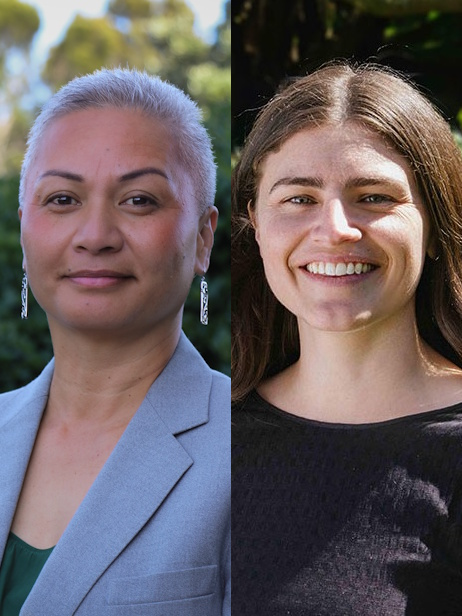

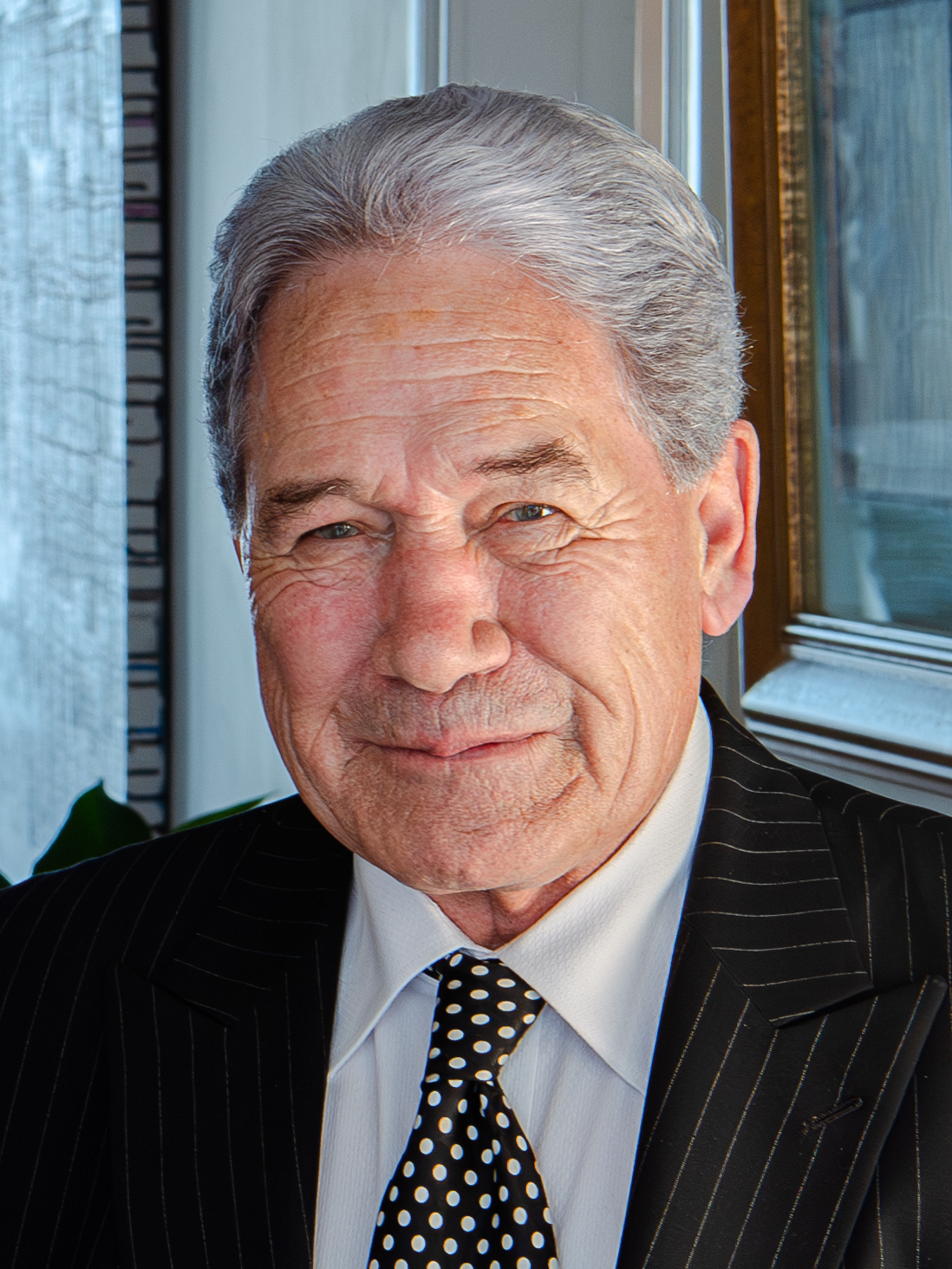

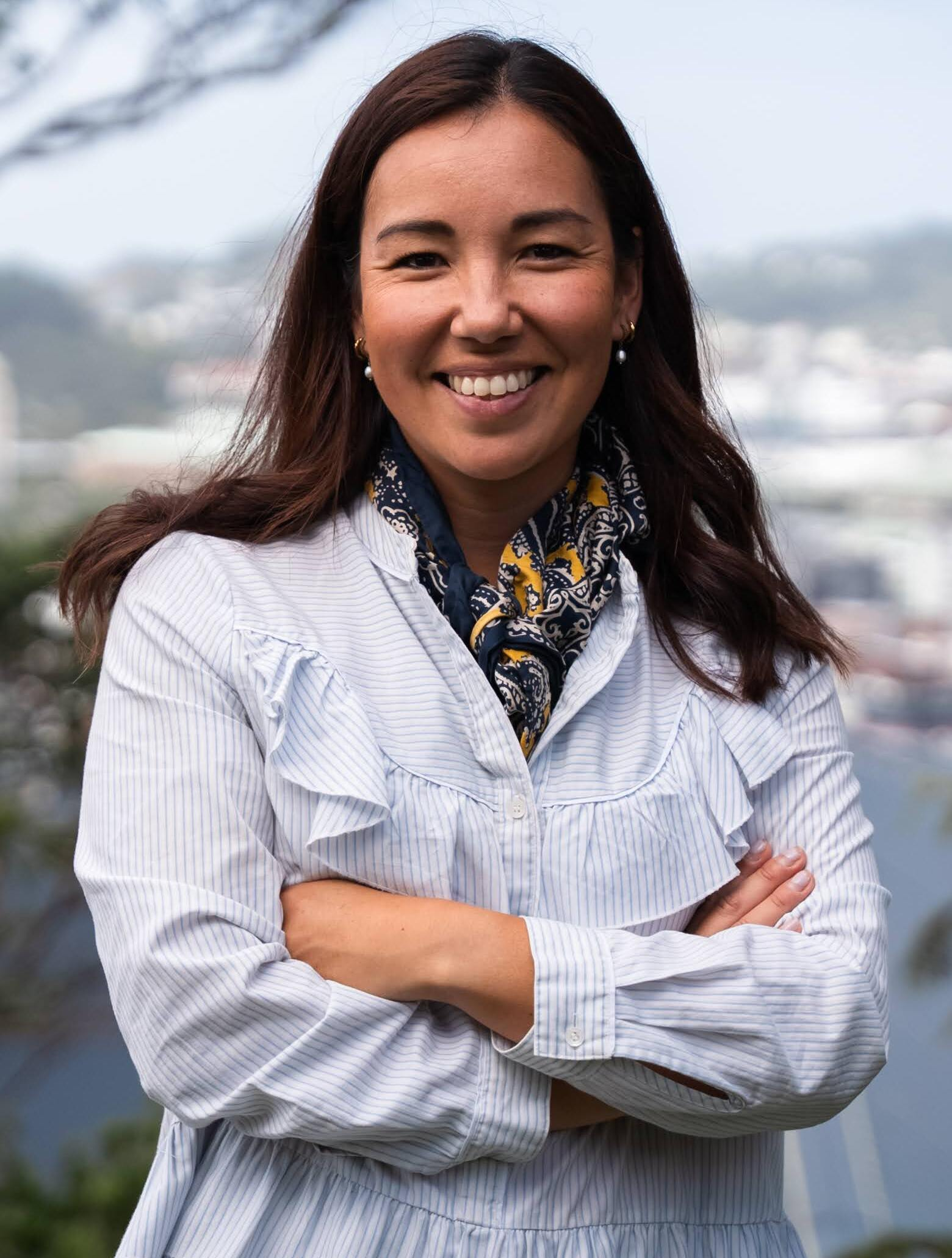

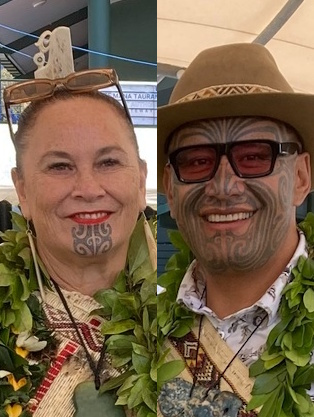
	First party	Second party	Third party
Leader	Christopher Luxon	Chris Hipkins	Marama Davidson & Chlöe Swarbrick
Party	National	Labour	Green
Leader since	30 November 2021	22 January 2023	8 April 2018 / 10 March 2024
Leader's seat	Botany	Remutaka	List / Auckland Central
Last election	48 seats	34 seats	15 seats
Seats before	49	34	15
Seats won	42	36	16
Seat change	▼6	▲2	▲1
Party vote	706,680	710,330	321,902
Percentage	29.21%	29.36%	13.30%
Swing	▼8.85 pp	▲2.45 pp	▲1.70 pp
	Fourth party	Fifth party	Sixth party
Leader	David Seymour	Winston Peters	Qiulae Wong
Party	ACT	NZ First	Opportunity
Leader since	4 October 2014	18 July 1993	November 2025
Leader's seat	Epsom	List	List
Last election	11 seats	8 seats	0 seats
Seats before	11	8	0
Seats won	13	12	7
Seat change	▲2	▲4	▲7
Party vote	264,121	236,630	144,298
Percentage	10.92%	9.78%	5.96%
Swing	▲2.28 pp	▲3.70 pp	▲3.74 pp
	Seventh party
Leader	Debbie Ngarewa-Packer & Rawiri Waititi
Party	Te Pāti Māori
Leader since	15 April 2020 / 28 October 2020
Leader's seat	Te Tai Hauāuru / Waiariki
Last election	6 seats
Seats before	4
Seats won	5
Seat change	▲1
Party vote	13,845
Percentage	0.56%
Swing	▼2.51 pp
- Preliminary results by electorate, shaded by winning vote share
Prime Minister and coalition before election
Christopher Luxon (National)
National—ACT—NZ First
Elected Prime Minister and coalition
TBD

The 2026 New Zealand general election was held on 7 November 2026 to determine the composition of the 55th Parliament of New Zealand. Voters elected 131 members to the House of Representatives under the mixed-member proportional (MMP) voting system, comprising 71 members elected from single-member electorates and 60 members elected from closed party lists to achieve proportionality. Eleven overhang seats were added due to the National Party and Te Pāti Māori winning more electorate seats than they were entitled to under the party vote. The election was one of the closest in New Zealand history. Around 399,000 special votes, out of the 2,832,000 total votes cast, have yet to be counted.

After the previous election, the centre-right National Party, led by prime minister Christopher Luxon, formed a right-wing coalition government with the ACT and New Zealand First parties. They sought re-election to a second term. The official Opposition to the government is the centre-left Labour Party, led by former prime minister Chris Hipkins. Other opposition parties are the left-wing Green Party and the indigenous rights-based Te Pāti Māori.

Preliminary results showed that the Labour Party is ahead in the party-list popular vote by a small margin, but still have six fewer seats than the National Party due to the latter's large overhang. This is the first election since 1981 in which National won the most seats but lost the popular vote. The National Party overhang resulted in several list-only members not being returned to Parliament, including party deputy leader and Minister of Finance Nicola Willis, and Speaker of the House Gerry Brownlee. The Opportunity Party won 6.0% of the party vote, gaining seven seats and becoming the first new party to be elected to Parliament since 2011. This was the first election in New Zealand where neither of the two major parties got over 30% of the vote.

On preliminary results, the incumbent National–ACT–New Zealand First coalition government holds 67 of the 131 seats, just one seat over the majority threshold. However, all major parties conceded on election night that the election was too close to call, and Prime Minister Luxon said the government would operate under caretaker conventions awaiting the official results. Official results (including special votes) are due on 27 November 2026.

== Electoral system ==
New Zealand uses the mixed-member proportional (MMP) voting system to elect the House of Representatives. Each voter gets two votes, one for a political party (the party vote) and one for a local candidate (the electorate vote). Political parties which meet the threshold (5% of the party vote or one electorate seat) receive seats in the House in proportion to the percentage of the party vote they receive. At this election, 71 of the 120 seats will be filled by the MPs elected from the electorates, with the winner in each electorate determined by the first past the post method (i.e. most votes wins). The remaining 49 seats will be filled by candidates from each party's closed party list. If a party wins more electorates than seats it is entitled to under the party vote, an overhang results; in this case, the House will add extra seats to cover the overhang.

The political party or party bloc with the majority of the seats in the House forms the Government. Since the introduction of MMP in 1996, only once has a party won an outright majority of seats, when the Labour Party won 65 out of 120 seats in 2020. Usually, parties negotiate with each other to form a coalition government or a minority government.

=== Electorate boundaries ===
Electorate boundaries in New Zealand are redrawn after every census. The number of South Island general electorates is fixed at 16, with the number of North Island general electorates and Māori electorates increasing or decreasing in proportion. For the 2020 and 2023 elections, there were 49 North Island general electorates and seven Māori electorates, leaving 48 seats to be elected from party lists.

On 25 October 2024, Statistics New Zealand announced that, following the 2023 census, the number of North Island general electorates would decrease from 49 to 48, with the number of list seats increasing from 48 to 49. Nearly half of North Island electorates were outside the permitted ±5% population tolerance, necessitating extensive boundary changes across Auckland, Wellington, and the Bay of Plenty. The Representation Commission released draft boundaries for public consultation on 25 March 2025, and finalised boundaries on 8 August 2025.

In western Auckland, New Lynn, Kelston and Te Atatū were reconfigured into Waitākere, Glendene and Henderson. In southern Auckland, the electorate of Panmure-Ōtāhuhu became Ōtāhuhu after losing the Panmure area. In Bay of Plenty, Tauranga and Bay of Plenty were substantially reconfigured, with Bay of Plenty renamed Mount Maunganui. On the East Coast, East Coast was renamed East Cape. In the lower North Island, Ōtaki, Mana and Ōhāriu were reconfigured into the Kenepuru and Kapiti electorates. In Wellington, Wellington Central and Rongotai were renamed Wellington North and Wellington Bays respectively following substantial boundary changes.

=== Changes to electoral system ===
On 16 December 2025, the New Zealand Parliament passed the Electoral Amendment Act 2025, which amended the Electoral Act 1993 ahead of the 2026 general election. The new law limits voter enrolment to 13 days before polling day, bans prisoners from voting, raises the threshold for voluntary donations from NZ$5,000 to NZ$6,000 and bans the distribution of food and most drinks near polling booths. The law change was supported by the governing National, ACT and New Zealand First parties but was opposed by the opposition Labour, Green parties, and Te Pāti Māori, who described it as amounting to voter suppression and discriminatory against younger and ethnic minority voters.

On 15 July 2026, the Electoral Commission announced that it would default to sending electoral information (including the EasyVote cards and information about candidates) to voters via email instead of mail. From 2026, voters will only receive their information in the post if the Electoral Commission does not have their email addresses on file. Chief Electoral Officer Karl Le Quesne attributed the switch from post to email to the shrinkage of New Zealand Post's services. Te Hapori Matihiko founder and chief executive Katie Brown expressed concerns that this digital switch could create barriers for many people.

=== Voter enrolment ===
In early July 2026, the Electoral Commission confirmed that more than half of ethnic Māori voters (302,096) were on the Māori roll while 255,627 were registered on the general roll. Enrolled Māori voters were able to switch between the general and Māori electoral rolls up to 6 August 2026. By mid-August, Radio New Zealand reported that overseas enrolments across the Māori electorates had increased by 67% since the previous general election. Queensland-based enrolment advocates Rachael Marie Johnstone and Nicole Orzecki attributed this surge to political upheaval in New Zealand boosting voter enrolment among Māori Australians.

In early August 2026, Radio New Zealand reported that youth voter enrolment has plummeted to 53% by 30 June 2026. This was the lowest figure in a 15-year decline in voter enrolment between 2011 and 2026. On 30 June 2011, 70% of young people between the ages of 18 and 24 years had enrolled to vote. By 2023, this figure had declined to 60% of young people. Auckland University of Technology political scientist Julianne Molineaux said that compulsory civics education in schools and lowering the voting age to 16 years would help combat the decline in youth voter engagement. Electoral Commission strategic engagement and partnerships director Shane Whitfield said that the Commission would seek to mobilise eligible youth voters via social media, radio and television broadcasting campaigns, sports clubs, schools, universities, polytechnics and malls. Make It 16 national secretary Malak Tamimi attributed the low youth voter enrolment to young people not seeing themselves being heard by politicians and other decision-makers while the group's national director Jamie Fountain urged the Government to lower the voting age to 16 years to raise youth engagement.

On 10 August, Chief Electoral Officer Karl Le Quesne acknowledged that 115,000 people were currently listed on the dormant roll, about 25% lower than the same time during the leadup to the 2023 New Zealand general election. Voters are placed on the dormant roll if the Electoral Commission is unable to contact them. While dormant voters are able to cast a vote, their votes will be counted as special votes and they would not be sent EasyVote cards.

By 15 October, the Electoral Commission reported that 65.5% of 18–24-year-olds had enrolled to vote. By comparison, 76.7% of 18–24-year-olds were enrolled during the 2023 New Zealand general election. Le Quesne said the Commission had promoted voter enrolment by attending 2,700 events and venues, collecting over 28,000 enrolment forms and contracting 36 community groups to mobilise voters. As of mid October 2026, the Commission's voter enrolment and information campaigns had amounted to NZ$13 million. In addition, several youth groups and individuals including Make It 16, Tomorrow Together, Future Generations the Otago University Students' Association, and Platinum launched campaigns and events to boost youth voter enrolment in order to get decision makers to address issues of interests to youth including cost of living pressures, education, climate change and homelessness.

On 18 October, Radio New Zealand reported that Prime Minister Luxon had picked 8 November as the election date despite the Electoral Commission favouring 17 October and 21 November as alternative dates. The Electoral Commission had regarded 8 November as "challenging, but manageable" due to advance voting commencing on Labour Day on 26 October (which is a public holiday). In response, several opposition figures including Labour Party leader Hipkins, Greens co-leader Swarbrick, and Labour MP Camilla Belich described the Government's abolition of same-day enrolments and choice of election date as amounting to voter suppression aimed at discouraged left-leaning voters from participating. A National Party spokesperson countered that the election date had been public knowledge for nine months and accused Hipkins of desperation. Similarly, Luxon defended his government's decision to limit voter enrolment to 12 days before the election date, arguing that it would reduce the time and work required to count special votes.

On 24 October, The New Zealand Herald reported that 307,991 eligible voters had not yet enrolled to vote by 23 October, citing figures released by the Electoral Commission. About 43% of unenrolled eligible voters were estimated to be young people aged between 18 and 24 years. The Herald reported that the 18-24 age bracket had the lowest enrolment rate at only 69.9% (307,842 of 440,692), compared with 77.2% during the 2023 general election. In addition, 92.2% of eligible voters (roughly 3,743,649 people) had enrolled to vote by 23 October, compared with 94.7% (roughly 3,688,292) during the 2023 election. A Te Ao Māori News report identified several barriers to voter enrolment including confusion and ignorance around the new registration cut-off date and digital barriers for the older people, particularly among members of the Pasifika community.

By 25 October, Le Quesne confirmed that over 132,000 New Zealanders based overseas had registered to vote, a "significant increase" from the 2023 general election. The Electoral Commission sent out 2.2 million emails to New Zealand expatriates overseas, followed by text reminders for those who did not open their emails. Radio New Zealand reported that some New Zealand expatriates had not receive text messages or emails from the Electoral Commission reminding them to enrol.

== Election date and schedule ==
The governor-general, Cindy Kiro, signing the writ for the general election, watched by the chief electoral officer, Karl Le Quesne (left), and the chair of the Electoral Commission, Simon Moore, at Government House, Wellington, on 4 October 2026

Unless an early election is called or the election date is set to circumvent holding a by-election, a general election is held every three years. The last election was held on Saturday, 14 October 2023.

The governor-general must issue writs for an election within seven days of the expiration or dissolution of the current Parliament. Under section 17 of the Constitution Act 1986, Parliament expires three years "from the day fixed for the return of the writs issued for the last preceding general election of members of the House of Representatives, and no longer." The writs for the 2023 election were returned on 9 November 2023. As a result, the 54th Parliament would expire, if not dissolved earlier, on Monday, 9 November 2026. Consequently, the last day for issuance of writs of election would be 16 November 2026. The writs must be returned within 60 days of their issuance (save for any judicial recount or death of a candidate), which would be Friday, 15 January 2027. Because polling day must be a Saturday, and two weeks is generally required for the counting of special votes, the last possible date that this election could be held is Saturday, 19 December 2026.

On 21 January 2026, Prime Minister Christopher Luxon announced that the election will be held on 7 November 2026. The schedule for the election under legislation is as follows:

21 January 2026 (Wednesday)	Prime Minister Christopher Luxon announces the general election will be held on 7 November.
6 August 2026 (Thursday)	Last day for registration of parties and party logos; last day to change roll type (general or Māori) for Māori voters.
7 August 2026 (Friday)	The regulated election advertising period begins.
7 September 2026 (Monday)	Candidate nominations open.
1 October 2026 (Thursday)	The 54th Parliament is dissolved.
4 October 2026 (Sunday)	Writ day – Governor-General issues formal direction to the Electoral Commission to hold the election. Last day to ordinarily enrol to vote (late enrolments must cast special votes). Official campaigning begins; radio and television advertising begins.
8 October 2026 (Thursday)	Nominations for candidates close at 12:00 noon.
21 October 2026 (Wednesday)	Overseas voting begins.
25 October 2026 (Sunday)	Last day to enrol to vote.
26 October 2026 (Monday)	Advance voting begins.
6 November 2026 (Friday)	Advance and overseas voting ends. The regulated election advertising period ends; all election advertising must be taken down by midnight.
7 November 2026 (Saturday)	Election day – polling places open 9:00 am to 7:00 pm. Preliminary election results released progressively after 7:00 pm.
27 November 2026 (Friday)	Official election results declared.
3 December 2026 (Thursday)	Writ for election returned; official declaration of elected members (subject to judicial recounts).

== Parties ==
Since the 2023 election, seven parties have been deregistered: DemocracyNZ on 15 February 2024, (Note: Got 0.24% of the party vote in 2023 election) Leighton Baker Party on 27 May 2024, (Note: Got 0.07% of the party vote in 2023 election) New Zealand Loyal on 26 July 2024, (Note: Re-registered on 5 August 2026) Democratic Alliance on 27 November 2024, New Nation Party on 29 January 2025, (Note: Got 0.05% of the party vote in 2023 election) Freedoms New Zealand on 1 May 2025, (Note: Got 0.34% of the party vote in 2023 election) and NewZeal on 31 March 2026. (Note: Got 0.56% of the party vote in 2023 election)

Party	Leader(s)	Founded	Ideology	2023 election result		Current seats	Status
Party	Leader(s)	Founded	Ideology	% party vote	seats	Current seats	Status
National	Christopher Luxon	1936	Conservatism	38.08%	48 / 123	49 / 123	Coalition
Labour	Chris Hipkins	1916	Social democracy	26.92%	34 / 123	34 / 123	Opposition
Green	Marama Davidson; Chlöe Swarbrick	1990	Green politics Social democracy	11.61%	15 / 123	15 / 123	Opposition
ACT	David Seymour	1994	Classical liberalism Right-libertarianism; Conservatism	8.64%	11 / 123	11 / 123	Coalition
NZ First	Winston Peters	1993	Nationalism; Social conservatism Right-wing populism	6.09%	8 / 123	8 / 123	Coalition
Te Pāti Māori	Debbie Ngarewa-Packer; Rawiri Waititi	2004	Māori rights Tino rangatiratanga	3.08%	6 / 123	4 / 123	Opposition
Opportunity	Qiulae Wong	2016	Radical centrism	2.22%	0 / 123	0 / 123	Extra-parliamentary
NZ Loyal	Kelvyn Alp	2023	Conspiracism	1.21%	0 / 123	0 / 123	Extra-parliamentary
Legalise Cannabis	Maki Herbert; Michael Appleby	1996	Cannabis legalisation	0.45%	0 / 123	0 / 123	Extra-parliamentary
Outdoors	Sue Grey	2015	Environmentalism; Conspiracism; Social conservatism	0.34% (Note: As part of Freedoms New Zealand)	0 / 123	0 / 123	Extra-parliamentary
Vision NZ	Hannah Tamaki	2019	Christian nationalism	0.34%	0 / 123	0 / 123	Extra-parliamentary
Animal Justice	Robert McNeil; Dannette Wereta	2023	Animal rights	0.17%	0 / 123	0 / 123	Extra-parliamentary
Conservative	Helen Houghton	2011	Conservatism; Traditionalism	0.15%	0 / 123	0 / 123	Extra-parliamentary
Women's Rights	Jill Ovens; Dawn Trenberth	2023	Gender critical ideology	0.08%	0 / 123	0 / 123	Extra-parliamentary
Alliance	Victor Billot	1991	Democratic socialism	—N/a	—N/a	—N/a	Extra-parliamentary
Free Palestine	Paul Hopkinson	2026	Anti-Zionism	—N/a	—N/a	—N/a	Extra-parliamentary
Te Tai Tokerau	Mariameno Kapa-Kingi	2026	Tino rangatiratanga	—N/a	—N/a	—N/a	Extra-parliamentary

== Candidates ==
=== MPs not standing for re-election ===
Damien O'Connor announced on 26 January 2026 that he would not stand in the West Coast-Tasman electorate again, and subsequently transitioned to standing in the Waitaki electorate. Andrew Bayly similarly announced on 3 March 2026 that he would not stand in the Port Waikato electorate again, and was exploring whether to stand on the party list. He subsequently announced on 20 June he would not be seeking a place on the National list and would leave parliament at the election.

Greg O'Connor announced he would seek a list-only position after boundary changes disestablished his electorate of Ōhāriu. On 8 June 2026, it was revealed he decided to not put his name forward for the Labour list. Following an unsuccessful leadership challenge against Prime Minister Christopher Luxon which led to the loss of his ministerial portfolios on 12 August, Chris Penk announced that he would not seek re-election.

Name	Party	Electorate/List	Term in office	Date announced
Duncan Webb	Labour	Christchurch Central	2017–present	21 October 2025
Paulo Garcia	National	New Lynn	2019–2020, 2023–present	16 December 2025
Maureen Pugh	National	West Coast-Tasman	2016–2017, 2018–present	23 January 2026
Celia Wade-Brown	Green	List	2024–present	28 January 2026
Judith Collins	National	Papakura	2002–2026	28 January 2026
Shane Reti	National	Whangārei	2014–present	10 March 2026
Brooke van Velden	ACT	Tāmaki	2020–present	24 March 2026
Greg O'Connor	Labour	Ōhāriu	2017–present	8 June 2026
Andrew Bayly	National	Port Waikato	2014–present	20 June 2026
Chris Penk	National	Kaipara ki Mahurangi	2017–present	12 August 2026

=== MPs standing for re-election as list-only MPs ===
Name	Party	Electorate/List	Term in office	Date announced	Notes
Megan Woods	Labour	Wigram	2011–present	3 August 2025	
Nicola Willis	National	List	2018–present	22 December 2025	
Deborah Russell	Labour	List	2017–present	8 June 2026	Contested New Lynn at every general election from 2017 to 2023.
Gerry Brownlee	National	List	1996–present	19 June 2026	
Nancy Lu	National	List	2023–present	19 June 2026	

=== List MPs standing for re-election as electorate-only candidates ===
Name	Party	Electorate	Term in office	Date announced	Notes
Mark Cameron	ACT	Northland	2020–present	8 June 2026	

== Fundraising ==
Under New Zealand electoral law, registered political parties are required to report any individual donations above $20,000 to the Electoral Commission within 20 days during an election year. During a non-election year, political parties are required to report all donations above $6,000, most anonymous donations over $1,000 (except those protected from disclosure), any overseas donations over $50 and the quantity and total sum of any large donations that were not made anonymously in their annual returns. By 24 September 2026, the following parties had received the following amounts in electoral donations; the table's figures below also include electoral donations from the 2025 calendar year.

Party	Donation amount (NZD)	Notes
National	$8,466,189.46	Includes $100,000 from Van Den Brink Karaka Limited, $100,000 from GMP Environmental Ltd (a subsidiary of Greymouth Petroleum), $100,000 from Auckland construction businessman Michael Sullivan, $50,000 from real estate businessman Garth Barfoot, $30,000 from former National MP Jim Gerard, $210,000 from the late Nelson philanthropist Robert Wares, $201,993.91 from American New Zealand tech entrepreneur Brian Cartmell, and $500,000 from the Rank Group. By 24 September 2026, National had raised $2,190,955 in 2026 via 35 donations from 32 donors.
ACT	$4,792,261.79	Includes $100,000 from GMP Environmental, $100,000 from Van Den Brink Karaka, $225,000 from toy manufacturer Nick Mowbray, $25,000 from Xero founder Hamish Edwards, $24,980 from Morris Hey, and $200,000 from Brian Cartmell. By 29 May, ACT had raised about $600,000 in donations over a 20-day period. By 24 September, ACT had raised $2,347,036 in 2026 via 47 donations from 37 donors.
Labour	$3,273,137.93	Includes $125,000 from the Mills Family Trust, $22,333 from Auckland donor Mary Theresa O'Brien, and $219,178 from the estate of Murray George Jones. By 24 September, Labour had raised $869,896 in 2026 via 15 donations from 15 donors.
Green	$2,191,873.65	Includes $132,000 from entrepreneur Robert Morgan, $50,000 from Les Mills gym franchise managing director Phillip Mills, $43,014.56 from Green MP Francisco Hernandez, and $100,000 from Stephen West. By 24 September, the Greens had raised $343,195 via seven donations from seven donors.
NZ First	$2,113,272.56	Includes $204,999 from Brian Cartmell, $100,000 from GMP Environmental, $50,000 from Michael Sullivan, $150,000 from Sir Peter Vela, and unspecified amounts from businessman Troy Bowker, GMP and Van Den Brink. By 24 September, NZ First had raised $753,000 in 2026 via 13 donations from 13 donors.
Opportunity	$671,061.24	Includes $50,000 from Phillip Mills, $100,000 from Brian Cartmell, and $180,000 from Alan Wilderland. By 24 September, Opportunity had raised $491,660 in 2026 via ten donations from six donors.
Te Pāti Māori	$255,986.50	Includes $60,000 from party president John Tamihere and $74,000 from Lance Norman. By 24 September, Te Pāti Māori had raised $114,000 in 2026 via two donations from two donors.
Te Tai Tokerau	$50,000	Richard Allen donated $50,000 via the Stanley Howard Fund.
Animal Justice	$12,707.95	
Women's Rights	$9,650.50	
Conservative	$9,519.73	
NewZeal	$8,796.00	No longer registered
Vision New Zealand	$6,718.43	
Legalise Cannabis	$336.00	
Outdoors	$270.00	

== Campaigning ==
=== Expense limits and broadcasting allocations ===
Each election year, the Electoral Commission allocates funding towards political parties for electoral advertising on radio, television and the Internet. Allocations are based on several factors including the number of voters a party has received at the previous election, the number of Members of Parliament a party has, the relationships between parties, indications of public support including public opinion polls and party membership, and giving each party a fair opportunity to communicate its policies to the public. On 7 May, the commission announced its broadcasting funding allocation decision for the 2026 general election. On 7 August, the commission amended the allocation as two parties, Change New Zealand and People's Party New Zealand Incorporated, did not register as at the date of the start of the regulated period. The commission decided to allocate the remaining funds proportionally to the eligible parties.

Original broadcasting allocation		Amended broadcasting allocation	
Party	Broadcasting allocation (NZD)	Party	Broadcasting allocation (NZD)
National	$1,079,519	National	$1,122,209
Labour	$913,435	Labour	$949,566
Green	$394,438	Green	$410,042
ACT	$332,158	ACT	$345,254
NZ First	$290,639	NZ First	$302,157
Te Pāti Māori	$228,359	Te Pāti Māori	$237,384
Opportunity	$114,179	Opportunity	$118,755
NZ Loyal	$83,040	NZ Loyal	$86,306
Animal Justice	$78,887	Animal Justice	$82,011
Legalise Cannabis	$78,887	Legalise Cannabis	$82,011
Change New Zealand	$78,887	Change New Zealand	$0
Conservative	$78,887	Conservative	$82,011
Free Palestine	$78,887	Free Palestine	$82,011
Outdoors	$78,887	Outdoors	$82,011
People's Party NZ Inc.	$78,887	People's Party NZ Inc.	$0
Vision New Zealand	$78,887	Vision New Zealand	$82,011
Women's Rights	$78,887	Women's Rights	$82,011

=== Third party promoters and others ===
Third party promoters, such as trade unions and lobby groups, can campaign during the three-month regulated period before election day. Promoters are required to register with the Electoral Commission if they intend to spend over NZ$17,000 on campaigning during that period. Registered promoters spending over NZ$100,000 are required to report their expenses to the Electoral Commission.

As of 22 October 2026, the following third party promoters were registered for the general election:

- 350 Aotearoa
- Action Station Aotearoa
- Democracy Action Incorporated
- E tū
- Every Kiwi Vote Counts
- Family First New Zealand
- Forest & Bird
- Free Speech Union (FSU)
- General Practitioners Aotearoa
- Greenpeace Aotearoa New Zealand
- Hobson's Pledge
- Infrastructure New Zealand
- Natural Health Alliance Incorporated
- New Zealand Council of Trade Unions (CTU)
- New Zealand Nurses' Organisation
- New Zealand Taxpayers' Union
- NZEI Te Riu Roa
- Public Service Association
- Reality Check Radio (NZ Media Holdings 2023 Ltd)
- Rewiring Aotearoa
- Save Animals from Exploitation Inc.
- Sensible Sentencing Trust (SST)
- Tax Justice Aotearoa
- Tertiary Education Union
- Voices for Freedom (TJB 2021 Ltd)

In mid-October 2026, the Taxpayers' Union acknowledged using several AI-generated advertisements including one depicting Labour leader Chris Hipkins stealing wallets. The advocacy group defended the attack advertisement, stating "we often use humour to make a serious and factual point, and this advert very much fits in that category."

In late October 2026 the advocacy group Sensible Sentencing Trust released several billboards accusing Hipkins and Greens co-leaders Marama Davidson and Chlöe Swarbrick of supporting criminal gangs. These attack ads were produced by the New Zealand Taxpayers' Union leader Jordan Williams' firm, the Campaign Company. In response, the Greens filed a complaint against the SST with the Advertising Standards Authority, accusing the group of "impersonating" the party. Following the complaint and news coverage, the SST removed images of the politicians from its attack advertisements but retained the message.

=== Party campaigns ===
==== National ====
In November 2025, the National Party announced that it would gradually raise the default KiwiSaver contribution for employees and employers from 3% to 6% by 2032 if re-elected. On 21 February 2026, National's conservation spokesperson Tama Potaka announced that the party would campaign on further restricting commercial fishing in the Hauraki Gulf. Following a cabinet reshuffle on 2 April 2026, cabinet minister Simeon Brown replaced Chris Bishop as National's campaign chair for the election.

On 17 May, Justice Minister Paul Goldsmith announced that National would campaign on scrapping "good character" sentencing discounts for sexual offending if re-elected. During the party's annual conference on 21 June, Luxon announced that National would make KiwiSaver compulsory for all workers and automatically enroll babies if re-elected. On 25 June, National announced it would introduce low-interest loans and planning reforms for installing home solar panels, battery storage, heat pumps, insulation and energy upgrades. The loans would come from a fund supported by the Crown, local councils and the Local Government Funding Agency.

On 2 July, National announced that it would prioritise free trade agreements with seven countries and using AI-powered tools to streamline export mechanisms. On 19 July, Goldsmith announced that National would campaign on toughening sexual consent laws to clarify that silence was not consent. The opposition Labour and Green parties criticised National for abandoning efforts to seek cross-party support on sexual consent legislation. On 26 July, National said it would campaign on extending parental leave from 26 to 30 weeks, and making it more flexible. On 27 July, Luxon said that National would not work with the Opportunity Party, citing disagreement with Opportunity's policy of raising taxes. A spokesperson for his office clarified that this ruled out any cooperation, including a confidence and supply arrangement. On 24 August, Simeon Brown was emphatic that National would not work with Opportunity, and Luxon confirmed they would not work with them even in a confidence and supply agreement.

On 6 August, Luxon announced that National would campaign on holding referendums on the MMP electoral system and extending the Parliamentary term from three to four years. On 8 August, National released its full list of election candidates. The following day, the party said it would campaign on following three budget responsibility rules aimed at restoring the economy to surplus, cutting debt and low taxation. On 23 August, Luxon confirmed that National would not introduce any new taxes if re-elected and ruled out plans to introduce a bed tax and bank tax. On 30 August, National announced that it would reduce domestic student loan repayment rates from 12% to 10% while increasing financial and legal penalties as well as interest rates for overseas-based borrowers in order to encourage more New Zealand expatriates to return from overseas.

On 6 September, National said it would campaign on making it easier for first-home buyers to access low deposit mortgages. On 8 September, National announced that it would allocate funding from the International Visitor Levy to local councils as an alternative to the scrapped bed tax policy. On 13 September, National announced that it would establish an Auckland Transport police team to boost security on trains, ferries, buses, stations and transport hubs in Auckland. On 16 September, National said it would campaign on splitting Foodstuffs into two separate companies in order to break the country's supermarket duopoly. On 20 September, National confirmed they would campaign on banning "screen time" in early childhood centres and limiting screen usage for Years 1–3 pupils in primary schools.

National launched its election campaign on 27 September, with Luxon announcing that the party would make ten commitments including boosting economic growth, no new taxes, compulsory KiwiSaver, extending paid parental leave, replacing the National Certificate of Educational Achievement (NCEA) and boosting roading, educational and health infrastructure. On 1 October, National said it would campaign on trialing digital identification for trans-Tasman travel between New Zealand and Australia. On 2 October, Finance Minister Nicola Willis said the party would consider opening Kiwibank to local private capital in order to compete with Australian-owned banks operating in New Zealand. That same day, National released its nine-point energy plan to combat rising energy prices; with key policies including making it easier for households to install and sell rooftop solar energy, requiring data centres to have their own power generation and amending legislation to allow the construction of more private transmission infrastructure.

On 5 October, National pledged to fully fund an extension to the Christchurch Northern Motorway, at a cost of $800 million in the 2027 budget, a project that had already been promised in the 2023 election campaign. On 6 October, National announced that it would invest $604 million in funding to boosting Pharmac's medicine budget, expanding free bowel, cervical screening and breast screening by 2029. These health investments would be funded by reducing New Zealand's international aid budget outside the Pacific to 10%; a proposal that was criticised by Foreign Minister Winston Peters and Opposition leader Chris Hipkins but supported by Deputy Prime Minister David Seymour. On 7 October, National released its small business plan, with a focus on cutting compliance costs and red tape.

On 8 October, National released its welfare policy, which proposed cutting $585 million in welfare spending. The party also proposed drug testing welfare beneficiaries with benefit sanctions for non-compliance. On 9 October, National said it would allocate $300 million to provide low-cost loans to farmers for water storage. On 10 October, National said that it would review bottom trawling policies, establish a new marine reserve off Waiheke Island and expand the marine reserve near Goat Island. On 11 October, National announced that it would campaign on requiring high school students to complete Year 11 before leaving school.

On 12 October, Finance Minister Willis said that a re-elected National government's fiscal plan would focus on reducing debt and would delay introducing any new tax cuts. On 13 October, National announced the five key commitments it would make during its first 100 days; namely lowering student loan repayment rates for New Zealanders living at home, widening access to 5% deposits for first-home buyers, extending paid parental leave from 26 to 30 weeks within three years, strengthening KiwiSaver programs, and fast-tracking work and visitor visas for partners of New Zealand citizens. On 14 October, transport spokesman Bishop released the party's Auckland plan, which included a pledge to remove the blanket ban on minimum car park requirements in city and district plans. On 16 October, National pledged to simplify council regulations around agricultural and horticultural activities. On 18 October, Justice Minister Goldsmith said that National would campaign on abolishing the legal "right to silence" in cases where children under the age of 12 were killed.

On 21 October, Luxon released National's "Plan for Kiwi Kids" package, which included a three-year math acceleration programme, limited screen time among younger pupils, keeping the cellphone school ban, and scrapping NCEA. On 22 October, National pledged to reserve 20% of homes built under the Government's affordable housing scheme for pensioners. On 24 October, National pledged to introduce financial literacy into the school curriculum and to make it easier for children to open bank accounts.

==== Labour ====
In October 2025, Labour announced policies for the establishment of an economic investment fund called the "NZ Future Fund" and the introduction of a capital gains tax based on property transactions to subsidise doctors' visits. In early November 2025, the party proposed free cervical cancer screenings for all women aged between 25 and 69 years. In mid-November, the party announced that it would repeal the Regulatory Standards Act 2025 within its first 100 days of government. Prior to the party's annual general meeting, leader Chris Hipkins confirmed that the party would contest all seven Māori electorates, citing the internal conflict within Te Pāti Māori, which holds six of those seats. The party sought to exploit growing voter disillusionment with the National-led coalition government's handling of cost of living, health, economic and housing issues.

In January 2026, Labour proposed a streaming levy on foreign streaming companies like Netflix in order to invest in the New Zealand film industry. In February 2026, Hipkins and the Greens co-leaders Chlöe Swarbrick and Marama Davidson announced that the two parties would work together during the election and in a future government. In April, Labour announced that it would campaign on reinstating school boards' Treaty of Waitangi obligations and reversing the coalition government's curriculum changes, mandated testing and so-called "politicisation of the education system." In mid-May 2026, the party declined to release details of its Future Funds policy until after the election, including such details as the cost to the Crown and which state assets would be merged into the fund, for which they cited several state-owned enterprises having Treaty of Waitangi obligations.

On 8 June, Labour released its party list. Police Commissioner Richard Chambers criticised Superintendent Rakesh Naidoo, the New Zealand Police's ethnic, iwi and community relations manager, for not disclosing earlier his intention to stand as a Labour candidate, saying that his candidacy made it untenable for him to continue serving in a senior Police leadership role. Naidoo's manager, Assistant Commissioner Tim Anderson, later apologised, as Naidoo had notified him earlier than Chambers claimed, and before he had made a final decision to stand for election.

On 10 June, Labour pledged to cap public transport fees in Auckland, Wellington and Christchurch at $20 per week from July 2027, while a $10 cap would be rolled out in other regions and centres. While Labour estimated that its proposed public fares subsidy would cost $65 million a year, economists Sam Warburton and Brad Olsen estimated that the programme would cost between $91 million and $112 million. On 16 June, Labour promised free maternity scans, as part of their Medicard proposals. On 24 June, housing spokesperson Kieran McAnulty announced that Labour would raise the Crown guarantee for community housing builders' social bonds. On 28 June, Hipkins proposed restoring the Apprenticeship Boost training scheme back to two years from 2028 and expanding the programme to include trades such as road construction, water treatment and hairdressing. On 8 July, Labour announced that it would introduce subsidies and two new loan schemes to reduce the cost of installing solar technology in homes, including low and middle-income households.

On 6 August, Labour released its small business package, which included promising faster invoice payments, tax relief on new equipment and reduced compliance costs. On 9 August, Labour announced that it would campaign on improving access for small businesses to government contracts and reducing red tape. On 23 August, Labour released its fiscal strategy; with key promises including reducing debt to 20% of gross domestic product, establishing an independent Parliamentary Budget Office to scrutinise government spending, and restoring well-being reporting. The following day, Labour released its election slogan "Better Starts Now," with Hipkins stating that the party would campaign on changing the government. On 29 August, Labour pledged to establish a $21 million fund for Māori-led trades training programmes. On 31 August, Labour announced that it would campaign on guaranteeing a job for nursing graduates in order to boost staff numbers in the public health service. That same day, Labour said they would campaign on requiring retirement villages to compensate outgoing residents within three months of their departure.

On 13 September, Labour released its superannuation policies, which included making employer contributions to KiwiSaver compulsory, raising the minimum employee contribution to 6%, maintaining KiwiSaver contributions when parents take maternity leave, and banning new total renumeration contracts that absorb superannuation contributions from employees into salaries. On 16 September, Hipkins said that Labour would campaign on banning major companies from charging excessive prices for goods and services. On 17 September, Deputy Leader Carmel Sepuloni said the party would campaign on extending the visa-free travel programme to Pacific Island Forum member states. That same day, Labour confirmed it would campaign on pausing some of the National-led government's educational changes including its plans to abolish the National Certificate of Educational Achievement (NCEA) and create an independent body for reviewing the school curriculum and subjects. Labour also confirmed that it would repeal legislation enabling the Youth Court of New Zealand to send youth offenders to military style academies. On 18 September, Labour announced it would campaign on introducing a corporate homicide offence into law.

On 20 September, Labour announced it would campaign on forcing the two supermarket giants Foodstuffs and Woolworths New Zealand to separate their retail and wholesale operations to help small grocers and encourage competition. On 21 September, Hipkins confirmed that Labour would not change the Government's interest deductibility rules for landlords if elected, adding that landlords would instead be covered by a capital gains tax. On 23 September, foreign affairs spokesperson Vanushi Walters and leader Hipkins announced Labour's foreign policy, which emphasised respect for international law and the United Nations Charter. Labour also confirmed that it would recognise a Palestinian state, impose economic sanctions on Israel and support South Africa's genocide case against Israel. On 24 September, Labour announced that it would invest $4 billion in building new social housing, improving classrooms, repairing hospitals and job creation over the next four years.

Labour launched its election campaign on 27 September, with Hipkins promising that the Government would forgive 10% of eligible student loans at a cost of $583.4 million over the next four years. On 1 October, Labour pledged to introduce a new "fair go law" to ban businesses from charging surprise fees, "worthless" insurance, hard to cancel subscriptions and "unreasonable" exit fees across a range of products and services. On 4 October, Labour announced it would campaign on restoring the former pay equity regime but declined to provide a specific figure for reinstating the programme. Labour promised to immediately pay 65,000 care and support workers over the next four years, costed at $2.5 billion.

On 5 October, Labour pledged to introduce a "right to repair" car manufacturing policy and strengthen scrutiny of fuel prices to combat overpricing. That same day, Labour said it would campaign on making international musicians touring New Zealand to include a local supporting act in order to support the New Zealand music industry. On 7 October, Labour pledged to make it easier for new banking companies to compete with major Australian-owned banks including ANZ Bank New Zealand, ASB Bank, Bank of New Zealand and Westpac New Zealand. On 8 October, Labour campaigned on forcing airlines to advertise their "real prices" and to compensate passengers for cancelled flights or significant changes to travel itineraries.

On 11 October, Hipkins confirmed that Labour would campaign on restoring locally made school lunches and rural school bus routes. On 12 October, Labour pledged to reduce the cost of school uniforms by limiting the number of branded uniform items families had to buy, and allowing more retailers to stock them. On 18 October, Labour to allocate $7 million a year into sports and recreational programmes for children and youths to combat Internet addiction.

On 19 October, Labour confirmed it would seek to progress an under-16 online social media ban to select committee level within the first 100 days of being elected into government. On 20 October, Labour pledged to improve the quality of services in hospital emergency departments. On 22 October, education spokesperson Andersen confirmed that Labour would campaign on hiring 1,000 more teacher aides at a cost of $80 million over the next four years.

On 28 October, Labour announced its social housing policy, with key promises including banning "no-cause" evictions, making rental homes warmer and safer and strengthening tenancy rights. On 29 October, Labour released its 2026 election manifesto, entitled "What Better Means for New Zealand," which collated its election policy announcements.

==== Green ====
In May 2025, the Greens released their alternative "Green Budget", which proposed investing $8 billion over the next four years in various green policies including creating a Ministry of Green Works and supporting sustainable infrastructure. Other notable Green Budget policies have included a new wealth tax, higher corporate taxes, a private jet tax, higher mining royalties and income tax rates. In mid November 2025, the Greens confirmed they would revoke all coal, gold and seabed mining consents approved under the incumbent coalition government's Fast-track Approvals Act 2024.

In early February 2026, co-leader Marama Davidson confirmed that the party would be fielding candidates in three of the Māori electorates including list MP Huhana Lyndon, lawyer Tania Waikato and former Te Pāti Māori candidate Heather Te-Au Skipworth. On 12 March, the party released its draft party list of candidates, which was finalised on 22 April. On 25 March, the party announced its housing policies including building 40,000 new social homes over a five-year period, passing a Renters' Rights Bill capping rent increases at 2% a year, and creating a national register of landlords. During the party's State of the Planet annual address on 19 April, Davidson and Swarbrick confirmed that the Greens would campaign on promoting mass electrification at the 2026 election. Swarbrick said that if elected, the Greens would prioritise solar, wind, water and geothermal energy over fossil fuels in response to the 2026 Iran War.

On 21 June, the party's co-leaders announced a range of wealth, inheritance and corporate taxes to "tackle inequality and corporate greed." They also proposed a tax-free threshold for incomes below $10,000 while raising the income tax rate for those earning over $160,000. Due to human error, the Greens' tax reform policy was accidentally released early on the party's website several hours prior to the Sunday press conference. The following day, the party corrected the economic costings for its tax reform policy by $800 million after the IRD administration cost was recorded in the wrong place. In response to the Greens' taxation policy, the National Party released an online video alleging that the Greens were seeking to tax 45% of incomes above $160,000. Swarbrick criticised the video as an inaccurate misrepresentation of her party's tax policy and called on National's social media team to remove the video. The National Party declined to take down the video.

On 6 July, the Greens released their "Drink, Swim, Fish" policy, which proposed phasing out synthetic nitrogen fertilisers, reducing the number of cows and sheep to improve river water quality, and protecting at least 30% of the ocean to restore marine ecosystems. On 16 July, the Greens announced that they would campaign on introducing automatic union membership for new employees. On 20 July, the Greens released their energy policy which included reducing energy bills by creating a new Crown entity called Kiwipower to invest in renewable energy and address the country's "dry year" problem. They also proposed zero-interest loans for solar and battery installations, legal plug-in solar panels, a renters' right to panels, and expanding the solar buildout for public homes. On 26 July, the Greens released their election manifesto and campaign slogan "For All of Us." Swarbrick said the party would campaign on taxing the rich and basic human rights including food, shelter and jobs. She also reiterated calls for a one-year pause on consents for new AI data centres.

On 9 August, the Greens campaigned on establishing a $2.4 billion trust dedicated to supporting marae as "critical infrastructure" during weather events and other disasters. On 20 August, the Greens announced they would campaign on restoring the previous Labour Government's school lunch programme and would seek to expand it to 400 other schools.

On 6 September, the Greens announced that they would create a government-owned supermarket chain called "KiwiMart" in order to break the country's supermarket duopoly. This policy would involve forcing Foodstuffs and Woolworths to sell 120 of their supermarkets and two distribution centres to the new KiwiMart entity. On 14 September, the party announced that they would invest $200 million into various Māori language initiatives including teacher training, the Te Taura Whiri i te Reo Māori (Māori Language Commission) and the Māori language development and support agency Te Mātāwai. On 20 September, the Greens said they would campaign on amending the law to allow market rent reviews to lower business rents, and allowing local councils to run rental auctions for spaces that had been vacant for over 12 months. On 22 September, the Greens announced they would campaign on capping political donations at NZ$30,000, prevent companies from donating, set up a lobbying public register and implement a two-year standing down period for ministers wanting to become lobbyists.

On 1 October, the Greens said they would campaign on restoring the previous Labour Government's pay equity scheme and invest at least $4.5 billion to fund a settlement for 65,000 care and support workers affected by the National-led government's abrogation of the scheme. On 3 October, the Greens said they will connect the country with intercity rail, costing $4 billion: introducing an overnight service between Auckland and Wellington; a passenger service between Christchurch and Dunedin; and extending the Te Huia service to Tauranga. On 4 October, the Greens pledged to make public transportation free for children, students, apprentices, Community Service Card holders, and Total mobility users, while reducing transport fees to $2 for everyone else.

On 5 October, the Greens announced that they would campaign on removing level crossings on Auckland's Western Line railway line to improve safety, at a cost of $2.5–3.5 billion. On 12 October, the Greens pledged to regulate artificial intelligence with the goal of protecting New Zealand creativity, data and jobs. On 13 October, the Greens released their economic development plan, which proposed creating 284,000 jobs over the next four years at a cost of nearly $6 billion. On 14 October, Swarbrick pledged that the Greens would give local councils the right to enact bed levies to fund infrastructure if elected. On 15 October, the Greens pledged to reverse the National-led government's $2.4 billion tax cuts to the public service, at a cost of $3.17 billion over the next four years.

On 16 October, the Greens said they would introduce universal payments for trainee teachers, nurses, veterinarians, dentists and social support workers in order to encourage them to complete their studies. On 17 October, the Greens pledged to abolish the training wage (which is currently set at NZ$19.16) and invest NZ$30 million in Māori and Pasifika-led training programmes. On 23 October, the Greens released their fiscal plan, which proposed increasing health spending by NZ$3 billion per year over the next four budgets, at a total cost of NZ$30 billion over the full period.

==== ACT ====
On 15 February 2026, the ACT Party held its annual State of the Nation address in Christchurch, where party leader David Seymour stated they would campaign on decreasing government spending, and merging ministerial portfolios. On 19 February, Seymour advocated merging the Ministry for Ethnic Communities, Ministry for Women, Ministry for Pacific Peoples, Office for Seniors, Ministry of Youth Development and Te Puni Kōkiri (Ministry for Māori Development) into the Ministry for Culture and Heritage.

On 16 April, Seymour confirmed that ACT would campaign on banning unelected appointees on local council committees from having voting rights. ACT Local councillor Davina Smolders had earlier clashed with Mayor of the Far North Moko Tepania for expanding the number of Māori iwi (tribal) and hapu (clan) representatives on the Far North District Council's Te Kuaka Māori Strategic Relationships Committee.

On 3 May, Seymour released ACT's immigration policies, which included deporting serious non-citizen offenders, a five-year welfare exclusion period for all residency visa holders, a $6 daily infrastructure surcharge for temporary work visa holders, strengthening English language requirements for most work visa holders, and creating a new overstayer enforcement unit within Immigration New Zealand. On 5 May, Seymour said ACT would campaign on allowing pharmacists to treat and manage several medical issues in order to reduce the workload on general practitioners and nurses.

On 5 June, ACT's education spokesperson Laura McClure confirmed the party would campaign on reducing the cost of school uniforms. On 9 June, the party's agricultural spokesperson Andrew Hoggard proposed a new Rural Workforce Visa to provide farmers and other rural employers with a year-round supply of workers. On 10 June, ACT proposed a "split-gas" emissions target to ease restrictions on so-called "short-lived gases" like methane. On 29 June, ACT proposed making it mandatory for health beneficiaries to get medical certificates issued by Ministry of Social Development-approved doctors. On 30 June, ACT's Porirua candidate Lyra Yan Zhang resigned from the party's candidate list after failing to declare her previous membership of the China Zhi Gong Party, which is aligned with the Chinese Communist Party.

On 2 July, the party's family and sexual violence spokesperson Karen Chhour announced that ACT would seek to amend the Crimes Act 1961 to provide greater protections for pets and their owners against coercion and domestic violence. On 8 July, deputy leader Nicole McKee announced that ACT would campaign on adding burglary to the three-strikes sentencing regime. In late July, ACT announced that it would campaign on transferring responsibility for game animals on conservation land from the Department of Conservation to the Game Animal Council, giving hunters a stake in managing the country's conservation estate. On 26 July, ACT announced it would campaign on boosting health spending including raising Pharmac's budget to 13% by 2033.

On 2 August, ACT candidate Paul Henry said the party would campaign on amending the law to give teachers "reasonable force" to remove disruptive students from the classroom. On 14 August, the party campaigned on introducing a "local tourism dividend" to support local councils as an alternative to a proposed bed tax. On 16 August, ACT confirmed it would campaign on amending public service legislation to end so-called "race-based hiring" in favour of resetting government agencies along the principles of merit and equal treatment. On 18 August, ACT's spokesperson for children Chhour said the party would campaign on introducing a "Working with Children Card" for vetting people working with children and young people. This system would work separately from police checks.

On 21 August, Henry announced that ACT would campaign on building a "National Cancer Centre" with two campuses in Auckland and Christchurch. On 23 August, Seymour confirmed that ACT would campaign on amending several laws including the Bill of Rights Act 1990, the Constitution Act 1986 and the Legislation Act 2019 to entrench the principles of equal rights, the rule of law and parliamentary sovereignty. On 26 August, ACT announced that it would revive its 2023 election pledge to abolish the Climate Change Commission. On 30 August, ACT announces its fisheries policies, which included imposing a nationwide limit of ten shellfish per bag in order to replenish fishing stocks. On 31 August, the party said it would campaign on abolishing the permanent residency visa category and raising the physical presence requirements for resident visa holders.

On 4 September, ACT released its transport policy, which proposed excluding so-called "non-functional art" from the National Land Transport Fund. On 6 September, the party released its climate change policy; which included eliminating New Zealand's net zero emissions target, carbon taxation, and repealing Climate Change Response (Zero Carbon) Amendment Act 2019. On 10 September, ACT announced it would campaign on dissolving the Waitangi Tribunal once all outstanding treaty claims filed by 1 September 2008 had been resolved. On 13 September, ACT released its party list. On 15 September, the party released its small business policies; which included capping the minimum wage for the next three years, introducing a lower "training wage" for workers under 20-years old, and tightening personal grievance rules.

On 18 September, ACT's energy spokesperson Simon Court released the party's electrical policy, which included retaining the energy companies, using "market forces" to curb lines management costs and allowing residential solar power to be sold back to the power grid at market rates. On 26 September, ACT announced they would campaign on rolling out 20 noise cameras to combat boy racers in Auckland's Tāmaki suburb. On 28 September, ACT released its supermarket policy, which proposed establishing a one-stop consenting shop for establishing new supermarkets and accepting food labels from overseas regulators by default. Seymour also ruled out endorsing the other parties' interventionist policies towards the country's supermarket duopoly. On 30 September, Seymour said that the party would campaign on getting the Government to buy the University of Auckland's former education campus in Epsom for the purpose of establishing a new school.

On 3 October, ACT pledged to ban resource consent conditions requiring people to participate or pay for religious or spiritual ceremonies such as karakia if elected. On 4 October, Seymour said that ACT would campaign on removing tax on KiwiSaver earnings in order to boost savings. On 11 October, ACT released its fiscal plan, which included progressively raising the retirement age and reducing disability benefits by $653 million. On 14 October, Seymour pledged to provide tax relief to landlords by allowing them to offset residential property losses against other taxable income. On 18 October, ACT proposed investing $400 million to retain general practitioners in New Zealand and attract overseas doctors over a four-year period.

On 19 October, Paul Henry said that ACT would introduce an "industry awards" scheme as an alternative to the "University Entrance" scheme in order to encourage more high school graduates to enter trades training. On 22 October, ACT announced plans to boost charter school enrolments by 10,000 by 2029 by establishing new charter schools in major centres and fast-tracking the conversion of state and state-integrated schools into charter ones.

On 26 October, ACT released its campaign manifesto, which proposed cutting $22 billion in so-called "wasteful spending" over the next four years. The party also dropped its earlier pledge to scrap the Permanent Resident Visa Category in response to "anxiety" among migrant communities.

==== New Zealand First ====
Despite supporting the passage of the Government's Regulatory Standards Act 2025 into law on 13 November 2025, New Zealand First announced on 20 November that it would repeal the legislation if re-elected into government in 2026. NZ First leader Winston Peters said that the party had only supported the Regulatory Standards Act due to ACT New Zealand's coalition agreement with the National Party. On 10 February 2026, NZ First deputy leader Shane Jones confirmed the party would campaign on reinstating ministerial powers in approving fast-track projects during the 2026 election. On 12 February, the party confirmed it would campaign for a referendum on the future of the Māori electorates.

In his state of the nation address on 22 March 2026, Peters announced that NZ First would campaign on splitting the four energy companies. Former National MP and NewZeal leader Alfred Ngaro announced that he would be standing as an NZ First candidate. That same day, Ngaro confirmed that he and his party would align with NZ First, citing "strategic realism and shared values." On 27 March, Peters announced that NZ First would commit $15 million to rebuilding the Christchurch Cathedral if it was part of the next government. On 29 March, Peters said that the party would campaign on expanding mining operations and curbing the enforcement powers of the Department of Conservation.

On 19 April, NZ First said it would campaign on breaking up New Zealand's supermarket duopoly as a means of lowering food prices. The party has proposed splitting grocery company Foodstuffs into two countrywide cooperatives—where one operates New World and Four Square, and the other operates Pak'nSave—in order to compete with Woolworths. On 17 May, Peters said that the party would campaign on nationalising the Bank of New Zealand and merging it with Kiwibank to form a proposed Crown-owned "National Bank of New Zealand." He also proposed enrolling all newborn citizens into a Crown-funded Kiwisaver programme. On 24 May, Peters said NZ First would campaign on establishing a special economic zone at Marsden Point to provide relief from planning regulations and the Resource Management Act 1991 in the area.

On 18 June, Peters said NZ First would campaign on disestablishing the Auckland Council's Independent Māori Statutory Board as part of their platform against co-governance. On 5 July, Peters said that the party would campaign on restricting voting rights to those holding New Zealand citizenship. Under the current law, certain legal residents including permanent residents are eligible to vote in elections. During NZ First's campaign launch in Auckland on 19 July, Peters said that the party would campaign on investing in oil and gas exploration through a newly-established Future Fund. Peters ruled out working with Labour. Deputy leader Jones confirmed that he would contest the Northland electorate. On 22 July 2026, Stuart Nash stood down as a NZ First candidate after being criticised for making sexist remarks about National MP Katie Nimon.

On 2 August, NZ First released its natalist "Kiwi Kids Grant" policy, which proposed paying parents $5,000 a year for the first three years, which would cover a maximum of three children. The party also confirmed former parliamentarian and cabinet minister Ron Mark as one of its candidates. On 6 September, the party announced it would campaign on opening conservation land to economic development including mining. That same day, Peters said that NZ First would campaign on restricting superannuation to New Zealand citizens. On 11 September, NZ First announced 14 immigration policies including tightening citizenship and visa requirements, strengthening powers to deport criminal non-citizens, demanding the immigration portfolio and holding a referendum on capping resident visas at 20,000.

On 22 September, Peters denied that NZ First had copied their health policy from an advocacy group called "Make New Zealand Healthy Again" but acknowledged that the party had been in contact with the group for several years. On 26 September, NZ First announced it would campaign on dissolving the Waitangi Tribunal once all outstanding treaty claims filed by 1 September 2008 had been resolved.

On 7 October, NZ First released its 50-member party list, which had several prominent newcomers including former parliamentarians Alfred Ngaro, Michael Laws, Harete Hipango, former Financial Markets Authority chair Craig Stobo, All Blacks rugby veteran Taine Randell, and former Mayors Jamie Cleine and Vince Cocurullo. On 9 October, NZ First pledged to ban the public sale and private use of fireworks on animal welfare grounds. On 10 October, NZ First pledged that it would seek to permanently raise the Working for Families in-work tax credits to $70. On 11 October, Peters said the party would campaign on tightening work migration policies by abolishing the "Accredited Working Visa" in favour of a shortage-led Skilled Work Visa.

On 14 October, NZ First pledged to amend the fast-track approvals regime to ensure that future developments include planning for necessary roading, three waters, and other essential infrastructure. Prime Minister Luxon expressed disagreement with NZ First's pledge, stating that this policy had already been codified into the relevant legislation. On 15 October, Peters pledged to increase the Royal New Zealand Coastguard's Crown funding from 40% to 70%. The same day, Peters said NZ First would campaign on overhauling combat sports regulations to improve safety and stop criminal influence. On 18 October, Peters said that NZ First would campaign on introducing a 12-month commuter train trial in the Canterbury Region, as well as restoring the Southerner train line between Christchurch and Invercargill.

On 20 October, New Zealand First proposed increasing government subsidies for video game developers from 20% to 40% in order to support the local video game industry. On 22 October, Peters announced several law and order policies including introducing "life means life" provisions into life sentences, "stand your ground" self-defence legislation, and a formal "degree-of-murder" sentencing regime. On 27 October, Peters announced NZ First's $4 billion "Commonsense Express" rail policy; with ten key promises including delivering the $1.135 billion Rail Network Investment Programme and the new Interislander ferries, making the Te Huia railway service permanent, and removing dangerous rail level crossings.

==== Te Pāti Māori ====
In February 2025, Te Pāti Māori proposed the creation of a Parliamentary Commissioner for Te Tiriti o Waitangi, who would have extraordinary powers to audit and veto bills that did not comply with the Treaty. The party described the policy as a "bottomline" in any coalition negotiations. In April 2025, Te Pāti Māori announced plans to run candidates in the general seats at the 2026 general election.

In January 2026, the party stated they will campaign on abolishing prisons by 2040 to address the high Māori incarceration rate, replacing them with "community-led and community-based solutions". On 27 May, Te Pāti Māori announced Ngātiwai Trust Board chairman Aperahama Edwards as its candidate for Te Tai Tokerau. On 23 June, the party's co-leaders Debbie Ngarewa-Packer and Rawiri Waititi announced that Te Pāti Māori's electoral strategy was to encourage Māori voters to register for the Māori roll. Waititi said that they would encourage Māori voters to give their electorate vote to Te Pāti Māori and their party vote to either Labour or the Greens.

Te Pāti Māori launched its electoral campaign on 16 August and introduced its Ikaroa-Rāwhiti candidate Haley Maxwell. On 26 August, the party launched its "Kiwi Tax Plan" with key tax policies including a 48% tax rate on those earning NZ$300,001 and above, a rebate for New Zealanders earning less than NZ$30,000, a wealth tax, an increased company tax rate, a land banking tax, a vacant house tax and a stamp duty.

On 1 September, the party announced several policies aimed at constitutional reform including establishing an independent "Te Tiriti Commission" to investigate alleged breaches of the Treaty of Waitangi by the New Zealand Crown, making Waitangi Tribunal recommendations legally binding, establishing a 2040 target for constitutional reform and establishing a $200 million Matike Mai Fund to implement constitutional reform and the United Nations Declaration on the Rights of Indigenous Peoples (UNDRIP). On 16 September, Te Pāti Māori announced it would create a $1 billion fund to increase Māori and community ownership of new renewable energy assets. On 21 September, the party released its "kai (food) sovereignty" policy; which included allowing Māori collectives to secure Crown and council-owned land, allocating $100 million in seed funding to establish supermarkets, and an income tax food credit policy. On 23 September, Te Pāti Māori released its Takatāpui (LGBTQ) policy which involved setting up a $200 million Takatāpui Commission with powers and funding to uplift children.

On 4 October, Te Pāti Māori released its party list, which consisted of its Secretary Lance Norman. The party is standing seven candidates in the seven Māori electorates.

==== Opportunity ====
The Opportunity Party (TOP) announced that it would campaign with policies that included reducing house prices through a land value tax, and introducing a "Citizen's Voice", consisting of citizens' assemblies for certain major issues. In mid-February 2026, party leader Qiulae Wong announced that Opportunity would campaign on replacing all forms of welfare assistance including superannuation with a means-tested "citizen's income." Unlike universal basic income, people earning more than NZ$350,000 a year would not be able to access it. The citizen's income policy would be funded by a land value tax, and savings from the benefits that would be replaced. On 16 February, the party's general manager Iain Lees-Galloway announced that the party would field about 30 candidates during the 2026 election with the goal of reaching the 5% threshold for the party needed to enter Parliament. During the party's State of the Nation address in Auckland on 21 February, Wong announced that the Opportunity Party would campaign on promoting national unity, banning bottom trawling and investing in renewal energy. On 20 March, the Opportunity Party released its initial list of 26 candidates.

On 2 July, Opportunity released its economic policy, which included investing in technology and commerce, strengthening the Commerce Commission's powers and forgiving student loan interest in order to draw back emigrant New Zealanders. On 31 July, the party released its party list of 40 electorate candidates. On 16 August, Opportunity proposed several policies to regulate lobbying and political donations including capping political donations and establishing an independent anti-corruption entity to coordinate anti-corruption activities.

On 18 September, Opportunity released its climate change policy, which included introducing a methane emissions trading scheme and investing $5 billion in climate adaptation. On 30 September, Wong outlined the party's five "non-negotiable" policies including a ten-year health plan, lobbying reform, banning bottom trawling, attacking monopolies and duopolies and bolstering the country's climate change commitments.

The party is open to a coalition with either Labour or National. Wong subsequently qualified her party's position by stating that it would not support a government that had Winston Peters as foreign minister. Wong said they would first negotiate with whichever party received the most seats, after earlier saying it would be the party with the most votes. Opportunity may enter a formal coalition, or may provide confidence and supply, or sit on the crossbenches.

=== Other parties and groups ===
On 7 June, the Maritime Union of New Zealand's (MUNZ) national council unanimously voted to affiliate with the Alliance party. The union also confirmed it would continue its long-standing affiliation with the Labour Party.

On 28 October, Local Government New Zealand, Hurunui District Council and Environment Canterbury called on the next government to invest more funding into flood mitigation and climate resilience, citing the adverse financial and social impact of previous disasters including the 2016 Kaikōura earthquake and the July 2026 Hurunui flood. According to figures released by the Climate Change Commission, the incumbent government had allocated 97% of government spending to responding to natural hazards, with only 3% being allocated to building resilience. The following day, Mayor of Auckland Wayne Brown released a manifesto focusing on five priorities including improving public transportation, supporting growth in "the right places," supporting Auckland's economic drive, cutting "stupid rules" and not neglecting the environment and resilience. Brown also criticised the central government for interfering with Auckland's roading and housing unitary policies, telling them to "sod off."

=== Debates ===
The Opportunity Party qualified for TVNZ's planned multi-party debate with the 1 News–Verian poll in June, making it the only extra-parliamentary party to be invited. TVNZ, Stuff Group, and the New Zealand Herald announced their debate schedules on 20 August 2026. Christopher Luxon declined TVNZ's second proposed leaders debate.

In September 2026, the Green and Labour parties pulled out of a series of local electorate-based debates hosted by the New Zealand Taxpayers' Union following allegations made by Nicky Hager in his book Dirty Work. In October 2026, National candidate Karuna Muthu left in the middle of a Wellington Bays candidates meeting after clashing with organisers for asking what he regarded as "loaded left-wing" questions.

Table of major debates
Date	Time (NZT)	Organiser(s)	Subject	Participants						
Date	Time (NZT)	Organiser(s)	Subject	National	Labour	Green	ACT	NZ First	Māori	Opportunity
6 August		Engineering NZ	Infrastructure	Present; Bishop	Present; McAnulty	Present; Genter	Present; Court	Present; Jones	Absent	Not invited
5 September		Q+A	Rural	Present; McClay	Present; Luxton	Present; Abel	Present; Hoggard	Present; Patterson	Absent	Present; Eb
30 September		Federated Farmers	Rural	Present; McClay	Present; Luxton	Present; Abel	Present; Hoggard	Present; Patterson	Not invited	Not invited
1 October	19:30	Stuff	Kingmaker Debate	Not invited	Not invited	Present; Swarbrick	Present; Seymour	Present; Peters	Present; Waititi	Present; Wong
6 October	19:00	TVNZ	Leaders' debate	Present; Luxon	Present; Hipkins	Not invited	Not invited	Not invited	Not invited	Not invited
7 October	19:00	NZ Herald	New Zealand's future	Present; Willis	Present; Edmonds	Present; Paul	Present; McKee	Present; Jones	Present; Kaipara	Present; Eb
13 October	19:00	TVNZ	Multi-party debate	Absent	Absent	Present; Swarbrick	Present; Seymour	Present; Peters	Present; Waititi	Present; Wong
14 October	18:30	ASB	Finance	Present; Willis	Present; Edmonds	Present; Swarbrick	Present; Seymour	Present; Jones	Not invited	Present; Wong
14 October	19:00	NZ Herald	Leaders' debate	Present; Luxon	Present; Hipkins	Not invited	Not invited	Not invited	Not invited	Not invited
20 October	19:30	Stuff	Leaders' debate	Present; Luxon	Present; Hipkins	Not invited	Not invited	Not invited	Not invited	Not invited
21 October	19:00	NZ Herald	Powerbrokers' debate	Not invited	Not invited	Present; Davidson	Present; Seymour	Present; Peters	Withdrawn	Present; Wong
28 October	19:00	Whakaata Māori	Māori leaders' debate	Present; Potaka	Present; Jackson	Present; Davidson	Absent	Present; Jones	Present; Ngarewa-Packer	Not invited
29 October	19:30	TVNZ	Kaupapa Māori	Present; Potaka	Present; Jackson	Present; Davidson	Present; McKee	Present; Jones	Present; Waititi	Present; Skipper
5 November	19:00	Q+A	People's Debate	Present; Willis	Present; McAnulty	Present; Swarbrick	Present; Seymour	Present; Jones	Present; Maipi-Clarke	Present; Wong

== Issues ==
=== Public opinion polling ===
According to an Ipsos Issues Monitor survey released in late May 2026, the top ten issues concerning voters during the 2026 general election were the inflation/cost of living (61%), healthcare (39%), the economy (33%), petrol prices (26%) and housing (21%), unemployment (19%), poverty/inequality (17%), crime (16%), climate change, and education. Respondents ranked Labour as the political party most capable of managing inflation, healthcare, petrol prices, housing, unemployment, poverty and education. Respondents ranked National as most capable of handling the economy and crime while the Greens were ranked as most capable of handling climate change. Ipsos surveyed 1,001 New Zealanders aged 18 and over between 15 and 20 May. Results were weighted by age, gender and region, with a maximum margin of error of ±3.1% at a 95% confidence level.

A follow-up Ipsos survey released in late September 2026 identified cost of living, healthcare, the economy, unemployment and housing as the top five issues for the 2026 general election. Respondents ranked Labour as the political party most capable of managing poverty/inequality, fuel, education, immigration, taxation, drug/alcohol abuse, debt, transportation/infrastructure, race relations and population/overpopulation. Respondents ranked National as most capable of handling law and order issues, defence, foreign affairs and terrorism. The Greens were ranked as most capable of handling climate change, environmental pollution and water concerns while Te Pāti Māori was considered the party best capable of managing Māori issues. The survey also found that 64% of respondents supported the Greens' proposed wealth tax of 2.5% on assets worth above $10 million (excluding family homes). Half of respondents also supported a tax on assets and gifts exceeding $1 million (excluding family homes and farms) along with a bed tax on short-term accommodation stays. The survey also found that 45% of respondents supported Labour's proposed capital gains tax while less than 25% of respondents supported the Opportunity Party's proposed land tax. Ipsos surveyed 1,003 New Zealanders aged 18 and over between 3 and 11 September, with a confidence level of +/-3.5 percentage points.

In late September 2026, a Gallup survey of 1,000 New Zealanders asking the question "what people need leaders to hear in 2026" found that key concerns were the economy (29.4%), social issues (19.9%), healthcare (9.5%), food and housing at (8.6%), politics and government (7.4%), and the environment (5.2%). Lesser issues of concern included crime and public safety (3.4%), infrastructure (1.2%), the news media (1%) and immigration and refugees (0.6%). Analysing the results, University of Otago economist Associate Professor Dennis Wesselbaum suggested that New Zealanders were not solely concerned with the economy but were also concerned about affordability, social cohesion, healthcare and access to basic services.

A third Ipsos survey released in early November 2026 identified inflation and cost of living (64%), healthcare and hospitals (45%), fuel and petrol prices (31%), the economy (30%) and unemployment (19%) as the top five issues of the 2026 general election. Respondents ranked Labour as the party most capable of handling these five top issues while the incumbent National Party was ranked as most capable of handling crime and law and order. The Green Party was ranked as most capable of handling climate change and environmental pollution while Te Pāti Māori was ranked as most capable of managing Māori issues. Ipsos surveyed 1,008 adult New Zealanders between 19 and 27 October.

=== Citizenship and immigration ===
On 20 August 2026, a Curia Market Research poll conducted for the New Zealand Taxpayers' Union found that 59% of respondents favoured limiting voting in general elections to New Zealand citizens, while 32% opposed excluding non-citizens and 9% were unsure. This poll was in response to the populist New Zealand First party campaigning in July 2026 to limit voting rights to citizens and excluding resident visa holders. The survey found majority support for restricting suffrage to citizens among supporters of the National, New Zealand First, ACT, Labour and Green parties while only 38% of Te Pāti Māori voters supported such a policy. Younger voters aged between 18 and 39s years (63%) were more likely than older age groups to support restricting voting to citizens; compared with 58% of voters aged between 40 and 59 years and 56% of voters aged 60 years and above. Curia's poll surveyed 1,000 people between 1 and 4 August.

During the annual Immigration Conference in Auckland on 11 August, several politicians gave speeches outlining their parties' immigration policies. While ACT and NZ First have campaigned on tightening immigration controls, National, Labour and the Greens refrained from adopting populist anti-immigration policies. ACT has proposed replacing the ballot system for parent resident visas with a queue system and abolishing the permanent resident category visa. NZ First announced a dozen proposals to tighten migration and citizenship policies. National has said it would retain the permanent resident category visa while opposing NZ First and the Greens' proposed amnesty for Pasifika overstayers. Labour has proposed creating a citizenship pathway for the children of overstayers, a longer permanent residency visa process, and reviewing the financial criteria for parental reunification visas. The Greens announced several policies including a "settled residency pathway" for migrants who have resided in New Zealand for five years, ending a 12-month stand-down period requiring workers to leave the countries while applying for visas, and allow migrant workers to change jobs.

In late October 2026, ACT scrapped its campaign pledge to scrap the Permanent Resident Visa Category in response to "anxiety" among migrant communities.

=== Law and order ===
On 14 October 2026, several Green and Te Pāti Māori candidates including Members of Parliament Oriini Kaipara, Hana-Rawhiti Maipi-Clarke, Hūhana Lyndon met with members of the criminal gang Mongrel Mob including Harry Tam during an election meeting near South Auckland. Photos of the meeting were circulated on social media. The meeting was criticised by National Party MP Paul Goldsmith, who accused the Greens of "prioritising" gangs over victims, and victim's advocate Claire Buckley. Similar criticism was voiced by Labour Party leader Chris Hipkins, who ruled out appointing Green and Te Pāti Māori ministers to the police and corrections portfolios in a future-led Labour government. Labour's justice spokesperson Willie Jackson described the meeting as "not a good strategic move." In response to criticism, Greens co-leader Marama Davidson defended her party's engagement with what she called "marginalised communities" and said that the Greens also met with victims of crime. The following day, Davidson doubled down on her position, stating that "ministers and MPs visit prisons and meet with criminals all the time to better understand what's going on." Similar sentiments were echoed by Kaipara, who said their visit was not intended to condone gang activity but instead "meant recognising that whānau do not stop being whānau because of a patch." Te Pāti Māori's general manager Kiri Tamihere-Waititi accused National and Labour of "manufacturing outrage."

Newsroom's associate editor Sam Sachdeva opined that the Greens' outreach to gang members could jeopardise gains that the party had made by campaigning on cost of living and economic issues. The Spinoff's Lyric Waiwiri-Smith described the politicians' photoshoot with gang members as a "spectacularly risky political move" while acknowledging that gang members were also constituents. Left-wing blogger Martyn Bradbury defended the right of political leaders to meet with gang members to discuss social policy but was critical of their decision to pose for photos with gang members since it handed ammunition to their political enemies.

After Te Ao Māori News released footage of Labour candidate Kerrin Leoni campaigning at a Mongrel Mob event in early October 2026, she resigned as a Labour candidate on 23 October. While Labour leader Hipkins had initially supported Leoni, he subsequently stated that footage of her campaigning alongside gangs was "inconsistent with the standards" expected for Labour candidates. Since nominations for the 2026 general election had closed, Leoni's name remained on the ballot but without Labour's endorsement.

On 24 October, Stuff reported that National MP Tama Potaka had posed for a photograph with patched members of the Mongrel Mob during Māori King Tūheitia Paki's Hui ā-motu event in January 2024. This photograph was released after National had criticised the Green, Māori and Labour parties for allegedly consorting with gang members and being "soft on crime". In response, Potaka told Stuff that one of the individuals was a former school mate and that they were attending a public event prior to the passage of the gang patch ban. Luxon and Police Minister Mark Mitchell defended Potaka, saying that he was not campaigning or fundraising among gang members during the 2024 hui.

On 25 October, National removed a volunteer from his position as a member of their candidate Ankit Bansal's Palmerston North electorate committee for failing to disclose a prior sexual misconduct conviction.

=== Māori issues ===
New Zealand First campaigning for a referendum on the future of the Māori electorates, on disestablishing the Auckland Council's Independent Māori Statutory Board as part of their platform against co-governance. NZ First has also announced it would campaign on dissolving the Waitangi Tribunal. ACT has also announced it would campaign on dissolving the Waitangi Tribunal once all outstanding treaty claims filed by 1 September 2008 had been resolved. Conversely, Te Pāti Māori confirmed they would campaign on creating a Te Tiriti Commission to investigate Crown breaches of the Treaty of Waitangi, and make the Waitangi Tribunal's recommendations binding.

On 30 October, NZ First deputy leader Shane Jones pledged to introduce a bill forcing the Māori tribe Ngāpuhi to sign a Treaty of Waitangi settlement within the first 100 days of a new government that included NZ First.

=== Misinformation, disinformation and attack politics ===
On 9 September, the Advertising Standards Authority (ASA) partially upheld a complaint against a National Party attack ad alleging that the Labour Party's capital gains tax would hurt small businesses and superannuation. Labour has said that its proposed capital gains tax would not target superannuation, the family home, inheritances, shares, and small businesses. A majority of the ASA complaints board found that the National Party's ad claim that the capital gains tax would target GST was misleading. In response, the National Party's campaign chair Simeon Brown defended the ad, saying that the capital gains tax would have a flow-on effect on superannuation funds invested in businesses that owned property.

On 22 September, Labour criticised National for publishing a social media campaign video attacking the former for being "soft on crime" while showing clips of violent crime footage from the early part of the National-led government's first term. In response, Brown said that the video footage came from before the Government had passed its "tough on crime" legislation including banning gang patches and giving judges less discretion for sentencing. Labour's campaign chair Kieran McAnulty responded by accusing National of running a "dirty" election campaign.

In late October 2025, Victoria University of Wellington political scientist Mona Krewel's "New Zealand Social Media Study" found that the 2026 general election recorded the lowest level of disinformation on Facebook since the study began in 2020. Her study found 17 "half-truth" posts and one fake news post during an analysis of party and party leaders' Facebook pages. Krewel attributed the low level of disinformation to the 2026 election's focus on economy and the declining appeal of fringe parties which had capitalised on COVID-19 and vaccine mandates in the previous 2020 and 2023 general elections. In addition, Krewel's study found that several parties including National, Labour and the NZ Outdoors & Freedom Party were using TikTok and other social media platforms to reach young voters but that target audiences found the posts and memes "cringe" and "inauthentic."

In early November 2026, Greens co-leader Chlöe Swarbrick said that the National Party's attack ads during the 2026 election campaign amounted to "nasty hysterical cyber-bullying." According to Radio New Zealand, 37 of the party's Instagram posts over the past week featured Swarbrick, including criticism of her party's wealth tax policies and negative messaging about her becoming Finance Minister in a Labour-led coalition government. In response, National Party leader Christopher Luxon defended the advertisements and denied that they breached the Harmful Digital Communications Act 2015, saying "we just use their own words in in [sic] our promotion." Conservative Newstalk ZB broadcaster and The New Zealand Herald columnist Heather du Plessis-Allan was critical of National's attack ads against Swarbrick, opining they "have gone too far."

Between 5 October and 1 November, Victoria University of Wellington's Internet, Social Media and Politics Research Lab analysed 2,222 Facebook posts by several New Zealand political parties, finding a sharp rise in negative campaigning since 2020. During that period, the National Party published 371 negative posts, which accounted for 66% of its Facebook output. Labour published 214 negative posts, comprising 51% of its Facebook output. Negative campaigning accounted for below 40% of New Zealand First, ACT, the Greens, Opportunity and Te Pāti Māori's Facebook output; with TPM recording 16%. National published 100 posts attacking Swarbrick and 88 posts attacking Labour leader Hipkins. Most of Labour's negative campaigning was targeted at National's leader Luxon with less than 4% of posts attacking ACT and NZ Fist. Political scientist Mona Krewel described National's attacks on Swarbrick as "fearmongering" and reminiscent of American political rhetoric. Former National government press secretary and political commentator Ben Thomas suggested National was attempting to scare centrist voters considering voting for Labour. Hipkins described National's 2026 election campaign as "the most negative campaign a first-term incumbent government has run in New Zealand." Meanwhile, NZ First leader Winston Peters described the 2026 election campaign as the "worst" he had contested, criticising what he regarded as "performative virtue signalling" by politicians.

=== Poverty ===
In mid-October 2026, Aaron Hendry of the youth development organisation "Kick Back" called on political leaders to commit to ending youth homelessness. Kick Back released a 12 calls for action to several political parties; with key planks including reversing the Government's restrictions on emergency housing, stopping benefit sanctions and "move on" orders, increasing public housing and restoring welfare benefits for 18 and 19 year olds. By 20 October the Green, Māori and Opportunity parties had accepted the 12 calls to action while Labour had accepted seven of the proposals. The National, ACT and NZ First parties declined to respond to these proposals.

Following the inaugural Youth Homelessness Summit in Auckland held on 30 October, representatives from the Labour, Green, Māori and Opportunity parties signed a series of commitments aimed at preventing and addressing youth homelessness. While NZ First declined to sign the commitments, the party's representative Vicky Hau was invited to take the commitments back to his colleagues for further discussion. The National and ACT parties were invited but did not attend the conference.

=== Strategic voting ===
Strategies were proposed on both sides of the political spectrum to take advantage of the potential for overhang seats, under New Zealand's version of MMP. Overhangs are when a party or parties wins more electorate seats than the total seat numbers their party vote entitles them to proportionally. Compared to some other countries' MMP or similar systems, New Zealand has a high proportionate of electorate seats to party list seats and electorate vote winners are guaranteed to win the seat regardless of party vote performances. These factors mean there is high potential for overhangs, although Parliament had never before exceeded 123 MPs. Te Pāti Māori had been the most common beneficiary of overhang seats due to their concentrated support in the Māori electorates.

At its campaign launch on 16 August, Te Pāti Māori's leaders advocated strategic voting in an effort to replace the National-led coalition government, and to elect more Māori MPs, regardless of their party affiliation. They urged their supporters to give their electorate vote to the Te Pāti Māori candidate, and to give their party vote to either the Labour or Green parties. They estimated that up to 13 Māori MPs could be elected. The call was echoed by left-wing blogger Martyn Bradbury and University of Otago political scientist and International Socialist Organisation member Brian Roper.

With National and Labour both polling relatively poorly, it was noted that National could gain overhang seats for the first time, if National retained most of its electorate seats from 2023, leaving the party with more electorate seats than its party vote seat entitlement. It is common in MMP systems that major parties gain overhang seats when they win most of the electorates but "minor parties combined, achieve a significant share of the total [party] vote." This had not yet happened in Aotearoa, because each time a major party had performed poorly on the party vote (e.g. National in 2002 and Labour in 2014), they had also lost most electorates to the other major party.

Some right-wing advocates, including former National and ACT leader Don Brash, suggested that people give their electorate vote to National and their party vote to ACT or New Zealand First, to maximise seats for the right bloc with an overhang for National. At National's campaign launch on 27 September, former party leader John Key and current leader Luxon sought to dissuade their supporters from splitting their votes, to ensure that National had a strong representation in Cabinet. Key said that vote splitting would prevent several National MPs from being elected while Luxon described strategic voting as an "insanely stupid idea." In response, ACT and NZ First leaders David Seymour and Winston Peters disagreed and defended strategic voting. Seymour said that both votes belonged to voters and that "it's never wise to talk down to them." Peters accused the National Party of desperation and said that they were "giving out the wrong message" due to efforts by Te Pāti Māori and the left to encourage strategic voting. In late October 2026, Seymour reiterated his call for voters to give their party vote to ACT in order to strengthen ACT's parliamentary presence during the next term. Both ACT and NZ First approved advertisements written by Brash and placed in The New Zealand Herald by Reality Check Radio calling on National Party voters not to give their party vote to National, to increase the possibility of re-electing a right-leaning government.

In late September, Harry Mowbray (father of businessman Nick Mowbray) launched a website urging right-leaning voters to give their electorate votes to National and their party list votes to either ACT or NZ First to ensure the re-election of a centre-right government. In late October, the Electoral Commission confirmed that it was investigating a complaint from the National Party that Mowbray's website was confusing voters. Mowbray subsequently took his website offline. During a media interview, Mowbray confirmed that he had created the vote-splitting website for the purpose of discrediting New Zealand's mixed member proportional voting system, which he described as a "complete dog." In addition to his website, Mowbray spent up to NZ$17,000 (below the legal threshold for unregistered third-party promoters) to hire several social media influencers including Chantelle Baker and Penny Marie to promote his vote-splitting campaign online.

Separately to the overhang strategy, but consistent with it, on 28 October Peters endorsed National Party candidate Chris Bishop for the electorate vote in the Hutt South electorate while telling supporters to give their party vote to NZ First. Peters said that Bishop could lose his seat if he lost the electorate vote and described Bishop as a "cut above" the usual National MP. Peters insisted that his endorsement of Bishop was not a "political deal" but rather a "statement of respect." Bishop was also endorsed by former Labour cabinet minister and ACT founder Richard Prebble and left-wing columnist Verity Johnson.

The provisional election results showed an overhang of seven seats for National and four for Te Pāti Māori, for a total of 131 seats in Parliament, by far the largest overhang since the introduction of MMP. These numbers may slightly change with the final election results including special votes, but a significant overhang for both parties is expected to remain.

Parliamentary commissions in 2012 and 2023 had proposed ending overhang provisions. The commissions did not specifically anticipate 2026's circumstances or propose reducing the ratio of electorate to party list seats or how electorate seats are elected. They proposed ending overhangs as a necessary part of a "package" of changes (similar packages for each commission). Alongside slightly reducing the party vote threshold (from 5% to 4% or 3.5% respectively), the commissions proposed abolishing the electorate seat threshold whereby parties winning an electorate seat would qualify for their due share of seats from the party vote. Ending this electorate seat threshold would mean any electorate seats by parties not meeting the party vote threshold would become overhang seats, thus increasing the scope for overhangs. They instead proposed that any party's electorate seat entitlements exceeding their party vote share would reduce the list seats available to other parties, a reduction in proportionality that the commissions considered alongside other priorities.

No changes were made after the 2012 and 2023 reviews. The increased attention to overhangs in the campaign and results saw increased calls for changes to the system.

=== Supermarket duopoly ===
During the 2026 election campaign, supermarket reform was a key election issue. Two companies, Foodstuffs and Woolworths New Zealand, dominate 82% of New Zealand's supermarket sector including retail chains and wholesalers, creating what the Commerce Commission has described as a "supermarket duopoly." Their dominance has allowed them to exert pressure on suppliers and charge high grocery prices. Five parties have released policies to promote competition in the grocery sector and reduce grocery prices. The National and New Zealand First parties have proposed splitting Foodstuffs into two companies while Labour has proposed forcing the two supermarket companies to split their wholesale and retail divisions. The Greens have proposed forcing Foodstuffs and Woolworths to sell 120 stores and two distribution centres to create a third government-owned supermarket chain. While the ACT party has opposed breaking up the two supermarket companies, they have proposed easing planning and regulatory barriers to allow more competitors to enter the New Zealand supermarket sector.

In late September 2026, Finance Minister Nicola Willis said that Foodstuffs and Woolworths were waging a "full-court press" campaign using lobbyists, public relations campaigns, political insiders and influential networks to push back against political efforts to break up the supermarket duopoly. On 23 September, the pro-business think tank, the New Zealand Initiative, issued an open letter signed by 51 business leaders urging political parties to respect property rights in response to several political parties adopting policies on breaking up the supermarket companies and "gentailers", nationalising banks and revising retirement village contracts. The letters' signatories included Foodstuffs' North Island chief executive Chris Quinn and Foodstuff South Island chief executive Mary Devine.

=== Disruptive behaviour and violence ===
On 8 September, a group of NZ Outdoors & Freedom Party anti-vaccination activists including Jeremy Verity and former ACT party marketing director John Ansell confronted Labour MP and candidate Ayesha Verrall during a candidates event in Wadestown, Wellington. Ansell reportedly accused Verrall of mass murder while livestreaming a social media video. Volunteers and candidates formed a human barrier to protect Verrall. Police were called to the event to manage the situation. Labour leader Hipkins expressed support for Verrall and said that "some people had strong anti-science views and they did not represent the vast bulk of New Zealanders." In response to the heckling incident, Verrall issued an open letter calling on election event organisers to moderate proceedings and follow Parliamentary Services' event security guidance. While most Wellington North candidates signed the open letter, NZ First candidate Taylor Arneil and Act candidate Matthew Hague declined to sign the letter, dismissing as "performative hypocritical nonsense."

On 10 September, left-wing podcaster Mike "Chewie" Bennett, a co-host of the Big Hairy Network, was arrested for refusing to provide police with identifying details after being removed by security from a candidate meeting featuring ACT candidate Paul Henry at Dunedin's Glenroy Auditorium. While Bennett accused Henry of violating his free speech, Henry accused Bennett of disrupting the meeting and trespassing. Sixty protesters gathered outside the building while police remained present.

Between 19 and 20 September, ACT's Tukituki candidate Rob Douglas was bitten by a dog while campaigning in Havelock North. In response, Douglas and candidates from several other political parties including National, Opportunity, Labour, New Zealand First and the Greens voiced support for a parliamentary review of the Dog Control Act.

On 26 September, Labour leader Chris Hipkins was confronted by Vision New Zealand candidate Karl Mokaraka while campaigning in Auckland's Ōtara suburb. Mokaraka followed Hipkins and asked him "What's a woman" before the two were separated by former Labour MP and Speaker Trevor Mallard.

On 11 October, several individuals including Dunedin climate activist Bruce Mahalski and Craig Hinton were denied entry to a New Zealand First event in Mosgiel's Coronation Hall featuring party leader Winston Peters by Police and security guards. Mahalski, who had earlier been denied entry to an ACT party event in Dunedin, claimed that police surveillance of activists had "ramped up" and described the police response as an "overkill". In a separate incident, an individual was removed from the event after attempting to ask Peters a question about climate change. An NZ First spokesperson said that one individual had been denied entry for causing disturbances at previous meetings while another individual had been removed for creating a disturbance during question time. On 28 October, two people were removed from a New Zealand First public meeting in Hutt South for disruptive behaviour including a man who did a Nazi salute and a woman who disrupted proceedings.

Following a vehicle ramming attack against Australian Member of Parliament Helen Haines on 19 October, Radio New Zealand reported that the New Zealand Parliament's "Security Information, Risk and Advisory Service" (SIRAS) handled 216 requests for advice or support between 28 September and 18 October during the election campaign season. During that 21 period, SIRAS was deployed 81 times and assisted MPs attending public events, travelling, and responding to protests and threatening behaviour. Parliamentary Service chief executive Rafael Gonzalez-Montero said that MPs had "significant volume of threatening language and abuse" while carrying out their work, with social media serving as an amplifier for abusive behaviour. Speaker of the House Gerry Brownlee said that increasing threats against MPs in the past three years had forced closer cooperation between Parliament and Police, describing the current arrangement as "the strongest protocol we've ever had with the New Zealand Police."

Similarly, 1News reported that several non-White political candidates including ACT candidate Malkiat Singh and Green Party candidate Tania Waikato had received online racist abuse and death threats in the months leading up to the election. As a result of these threats, Singh was accompanied by volunteers while doing door-to-door campaigning. Waikato described the online messages as a mixture of death threats, racial abuse targeting Māori people and sexualised slurs. In response to online abuse, 35 candidates including several MPs hired tech firm Areto to screen their social media accounts for abusive comments, with 30% of these comments being "hidden" in the past six months for being too offensive. Areto founder and chief product officer Jacqueline Comer said that racist abuse including antisemitism and Islamophobia dominated the offensive content, followed by sexist or gender-based abuse. Massey University communications professor Mohan Dutta attributed the rise in anti-Indian and anti-Māori sentiment online to the growing inequality amidst a cost of living crisis and rising unemployment, and divisive rhetoric by politicians.

=== Vandalism of election hoardings ===
During the election season, several election hoardings were targeted by vandals. Vandalism can take the form of gluing googly eyes on candidates' faces, posting offensive comments and symbols, demolishing or burning hoardings. Vandalism places a strain on the financial resources of candidates, parties and the energy of local volunteers. Under New Zealand law, it is illegal to deface, destroy or remove election hoardings. Vandals can be charged with wilful damage or theft for removing hoardings, with penalties ranging from a three-month prison sentence or a fine of up to $2,000. Depending on the value of the item stolen, penalties for theft range from fines to prison sentences.

Numerous candidates from different parties across the spectrum have reported that their hoardings have been vandalised including Labour's Waikato candidate Jamie Toko, Te Pāti Māori co-leader Debbie Ngarewa-Packer, National MP Ryan Hamilton, Te Pāti Māori's Te Tai Tonga candidate Lisa Marie Murch, NZ First Taieri list MP Mark Patterson, Labour's Taieri MP Ingrid Leary and National MP Carlos Cheung. On 12 September, police charged a 43-year old man for vandalising 30 election hoardings in Pāpāmoa. On 16 September, police launched an investigation into the overnight burning of a National Party hoarding in Auckland's Mount Albert electorate. On 4 October, Cheung reported that his election bollard in Mount Roskill had been set alight overnight.

== Opinion polling ==
Local regression graph of opinion polls conducted

=== Seat projections ===
The use of mixed-member proportional representation allows ready conversion of a party's support into a party vote percentage and therefore a number of seats in Parliament. Projections generally assume no material change to the electorate seats held by each party (ACT retains Epsom and Tāmaki, Greens retain Auckland Central, Wellington Bays and Wellington North, Te Pāti Māori retains their Māori electorates, etc).

However, these projections generally assume that the National Party will not receive an overhang. Projections showing National winning fewer than 44 seats (the number of electorate seats it currently holds) therefore assume that it will lose a sufficient number of electorates to avoid an overhang. Most projections also assume that Te Pāti Māori will retain Hauraki-Waikato, Tāmaki Makaurau, Te Tai Hauāuru and Waiariki, but not Te Tai Tokerau or Te Tai Tonga, which are held by MPs who are no longer members of the party. Some projections include Te Tai Tokerau Party, established by a former Te Pāti Māori MP who currently holds the Te Tai Tokerau electorate, while others do not. Parties that do not hold an electorate seat and poll below 5% are assumed to win no seats.

When determining the scenarios for the overall result, the minimum parties necessary to form majority governments are listed (provided parties have indicated openness to working together). Actual governments formed may include other parties beyond the minimum required for a majority; this happened after the 2014 New Zealand general election, when National only needed one seat from another party to reach a 61-seat majority, but instead chose to form a 64-seat government with Māori, ACT and United Future.

Pollster Date	Seats in parliament (Note: Forecasted seats are calculated using the Electoral Commission's MMP seat allocation calculator, based on polling results.)									Likeliest government formation
Pollster Date	NAT	LAB	GRN	ACT	NZF	TPM	OPP	TTT	Total	Likeliest government formation
2026 preliminary election result 7 Nov 2026	42*******	36	16	13	12	5****	7	0	131	National–ACT–NZ First (67)
The Post/Freshwater Strategy 29 Oct – 3 Nov 2026	32	37	16	12	15	4**	6	0	122	Hung parliament (Opportunity holds the balance of power)
Taxpayers' Union–Curia 28 Oct – 3 Nov 2026	35	34	18	13	12	1	7	0	120	Hung parliament
1News–Verian 29 Oct – 2 Nov 2026	36	35	20	12	10	4****	7	1*	125	Hung parliament (Opportunity holds the balance of power)
RNZ-Reid Research 20–26 Oct 2026	30	37	18	12	12	2	9	0	120	Hung parliament (Opportunity holds the balance of power)
1News–Verian 21–25 Oct 2026	34	33	18	15	12	4****	8	1*	125	Hung parliament (Opportunity holds the balance of power)
Roy Morgan 28 Sep – 25 Oct 2026	32	33	19	13	12	4***	10	0	123	Hung parliament (Opportunity holds the balance of power)
1News–Verian 15–19 Oct 2026	38	32	19	13	9	4***	8	1*	124	Hung parliament (Opportunity holds the balance of power)
The Post/Freshwater Strategy 9–19 Oct 2026	34	35	17	11	14	4**	7	0	122	Hung parliament (Opportunity holds the balance of power)
1News–Verian 8–12 Oct 2026	34	34	18	12	12	4****	10	1*	125	Hung parliament (Opportunity holds the balance of power)
Anacta 6–10 Oct 2026	34	36	18	11	12	4**	7	0	122	Hung parliament (Opportunity holds the balance of power)
Taxpayers' Union–Curia 1–5 Oct 2026	37	36	17	12	16	2	0	0	120	National–NZ First–ACT (65)
1News–Verian 1–5 Oct 2026	35	34	19	11	12	4***	8	1*	124	Hung parliament (Opportunity holds the balance of power)
RNZ–Reid Research 24 Sep – 1 Oct 2026	32	37	18	11	13	2	7	0	120	Hung parliament (Opportunity holds the balance of power)
1News–Verian 23–27 Sep 2026	34	34	19	14	11	4***	7	1*	124	Hung parliament (Opportunity holds the balance of power)
Roy Morgan 31 Aug – 27 Sep 2026	38	28	19	13	12	4**	8	0	122	National–ACT–NZ First (63)
The Post/Freshwater Strategy 4–11 Sep 2026	33	34	17	11	16	4**	7	0	122	Hung parliament (Opportunity holds the balance of power)
Anacta 4–10 Sep 2026	36	37	15	10	12	4**	8	0	122	Hung parliament (Opportunity holds the balance of power)
Taxpayers' Union–Curia 1–3 Sep 2026	39	35	18	14	11	3	0	0	120	National–ACT–NZ First (64)
Roy Morgan 27 Jul – 23 Aug 2026	37	29	19	13	9	4**	11	0	122	Hung parliament (Opportunity holds the balance of power)
RNZ–Reid Research 14–21 Aug 2026	35	39	12	9	15	4	6	0	120	Hung parliament (Opportunity holds the balance of power)
1News–Verian 8–11 Aug 2026	36	37	15	11	10	4***	10	0	123	Hung parliament (Opportunity holds the balance of power)
Talbot Mills 1–11 Aug 2026	35	41	10	8	16	4	6	0	120	Hung parliament (Opportunity holds the balance of power)
Taxpayers' Union–Curia 1–4 Aug 2026	40	36	13	9	12	2	8	0	120	Hung parliament (Opportunity holds the balance of power)
Roy Morgan 29 Jun – 26 Jul 2026	40	31	17	10	10	4**	10	0	122	Hung parliament (Opportunity holds the balance of power)
Talbot Mills 10–19 Jul 2026	39	42	11	9	15	4	0	0	120	National–ACT–NZ First (63)
RNZ–Reid Research 2–9 Jul 2026	36	43	13	10	15	4*	0	0	121	National–ACT–NZ First (61)
Taxpayers' Union–Curia 1–5 Jul 2026	39	41	13	9	14	4	0	0	120	National–ACT–NZ First (62)
Roy Morgan 25 May – 21 Jun 2026	37	31	16	11	13	4	8	0	120	National–ACT–NZ First (61)
1 News–Verian 13–17 Jun 2026	38	41	17	8	14	4**	0	0	122	Labour–Greens–Māori (62)
The Post/Freshwater Strategy 5–11 Jun 2026	36	44	12	10	15	4*	0	0	121	National–ACT–NZ First (61)
Talbot Mills 1–10 Jun 2026	36	42	16	8	15	4*	0	0	121	Labour–Greens–Māori (62)
Taxpayers' Union–Curia 4–8 Jun 2026	38	40	14	10	14	4	0	0	120	National–ACT–NZ First (62)
Roy Morgan 27 Apr – 24 May 2026	37	33	15	12	13	5**	7	0	122	National–ACT–NZ First (62)
Talbot Mills 1–10 May 2026	36	45	11	9	17	5***	0	0	123	National–ACT–NZ First (62)
Taxpayers' Union–Curia 3–7 May 2026	39	41	12	8	15	5	0	0	120	National–ACT–NZ First (62)
Roy Morgan 30 Mar – 26 Apr 2026	32	43	14	13	14	5*	0	0	121	Labour–Greens–Māori (62)
Talbot Mills 16 Apr 2026	36	44	9	10	19	5***	0	0	123	National–ACT–NZ First (65)
1 News–Verian 11–15 Apr 2026	37	46	14	9	12	5***	0	0	123	Labour–Greens–Māori (65)
Taxpayers' Union–Curia 1–2 Apr 2026	37	42	10	11	17	5**	0	0	122	National–ACT–NZ First (65)
Roy Morgan 23 Feb – 22 Mar 2026	33	43	14	12	14	5*	0	0	121	Labour–Greens–Māori (62)
RNZ–Reid Research 12–20 Mar 2026	38	44	12	9	13	5*	0	0	121	Labour–Greens–Māori (61)
Talbot Mills 2–12 Mar 2026	39	43	14	9	13	5***	0	0	123	Labour–Greens–Māori (62)
Taxpayers' Union–Curia 1–3 Mar 2026	36	44	13	10	13	4	0	0	120	Labour–Greens–Māori (61)
Roy Morgan 27 Jan – 22 Feb 2026	39	38	18	10	12	4*	0	0	121	National–ACT–NZ First (61)
The Post/Freshwater Strategy 6–12 Feb 2026	38	46	13	7	14	4**	0	0	122	Labour–Greens–Māori (63)
1 News–Verian 7–11 Feb 2026	42	39	14	11	12	4**	0	0	122	National–ACT–NZ First (65)
Taxpayers' Union–Curia 1–3 Feb 2026	39	43	13	8	13	4	0	0	120	Hung parliament
Roy Morgan 6–26 Jan 2026	43	38	13	11	11	4	0	0	120	National–ACT–NZ First (64)
RNZ–Reid Research 15–22 Jan 2026	40	43	12	9	12	4	0	0	120	National–ACT–NZ First (61)
Taxpayers' Union–Curia 14–18 Jan 2026	39	43	10	9	15	4	0	0	120	National–ACT–NZ First (63)
Roy Morgan 25 Nov – 21 Dec 2025	41	40	15	9	12	4*	0	0	121	National–ACT–NZ First (62)
The Post/Freshwater Strategy 5–10 Dec 2025	38	48	10	10	11	4*	0	0	121	Labour–Greens–Māori (62)
1 News–Verian 29 Nov–3 Dec 2025	44	43	9	12	11	4***	0	0	123	National–ACT–NZ First (67)
Roy Morgan 27 Oct – 23 Nov 2025	42	36	18	10	11	4*	0	0	121	National–ACT–NZ First (63)
Talbot Mills 1–10 Nov 2025	40	47	11	9	10	4*	0	0	121	Labour–Greens–Māori (62)
Taxpayers' Union–Curia 2–6 Nov 2025	39	42	12	11	12	6**	0	0	122	National–ACT–NZ First (62)
Roy Morgan 29 Sep – 26 Oct 2025	41	39	15	10	12	6***	0	0	123	National–ACT–NZ First (63)
Talbot Mills 1–10 Oct 2025	35	43	12	10	15	6*	0	0	121	Labour–Greens–Māori (61)
1 News–Verian 4–8 Oct 2025	42	40	14	9	12	6***	0	0	123	National–ACT–NZ First (63)
The Post/Freshwater Strategy 3–8 Oct 2025	38	42	11	11	14	6**	0	0	122	National–ACT–NZ First (63)
Taxpayers' Union–Curia 1–5 Oct 2025	38	40	15	8	13	6	0	0	120	Labour–Greens–Māori (61)
Roy Morgan 25 Aug – 21 Sep 2025	39	36	17	11	10	7	0	0	120	Hung parliament
RNZ–Reid Research 4–12 Sep 2025	40	42	13	9	11	6*	0	0	121	Labour–Greens–Māori (61)
Talbot Mills 1–10 Sep 2025	39	43	12	9	12	6*	0	0	121	Labour–Greens–Māori (61)
Taxpayers' Union–Curia 31 Aug – 2 Sep 2025	42	42	13	8	10	6	0	0	120	Labour–Greens–Māori (61)
Roy Morgan 28 Jul – 24 Aug 2025	36	42	17	13	9	6***	0	0	123	Labour–Greens–Māori (65)
Talbot Mills 1–10 Aug 2025	39	42	13	10	11	6*	0	0	121	Labour–Greens–Māori (61)
1 News–Verian 2–6 Aug 2025	42	40	12	10	11	6*	0	0	121	National–ACT–NZ First (63)
Taxpayers' Union–Curia 3–5 Aug 2025	40	43	12	11	10	6**	0	0	122	Hung parliament
Roy Morgan 30 Jun – 27 Jul 2025	38	39	14	13	12	6**	0	0	122	National–ACT–NZ First (63)
Talbot Mills 1–10 Jul 2025	39	42	15	10	9	6*	0	0	121	Labour–Greens–Māori (63)
Taxpayers' Union–Curia 2–6 Jul 2025	42	39	12	11	12	6**	0	0	122	National–ACT–NZ First (65)
Roy Morgan 26 May – 22 Jun 2025	40	37	14	15	8	6	0	0	120	National–ACT–NZ First (63)
Taxpayers' Union–Curia 7–9 Jun 2025	42	44	10	12	8	6**	0	0	122	National–ACT–NZ First (62)
RNZ–Reid Research 23–30 May 2025	38	42	14	8	11	7	0	0	120	Labour–Greens–Māori (63)
1 News–Verian 24–28 May 2025	43	37	15	10	10	6*	0	0	121	National–ACT–NZ First (63)
Roy Morgan 28 Apr – 25 May 2025	40	37	14	15	8	6	0	0	120	National–ACT–NZ First (63)
Taxpayers' Union–Curia 30 Apr – 4 May 2025	42	41	11	12	9	6*	0	0	121	National–ACT–NZ First (63)
Roy Morgan 24 Mar – 20 Apr 2025	39	36	17	11	11	6	0	0	120	National–ACT–NZ First (61)
1 News–Verian 29 Mar – 2 Apr 2025	44	40	12	11	9	6**	0	0	122	National–ACT–NZ First (64)
Taxpayers' Union–Curia 29 Mar – 1 Apr 2025	42	37	14	13	9	6*	0	0	121	National–ACT–NZ First (64)
RNZ–Reid Research 21–27 Mar 2025	41	40	12	12	9	6	0	0	120	National–ACT–NZ First (62)
Roy Morgan 24 Feb – 23 Mar 2025	41	35	18	10	9	7	0	0	120	Hung parliament
Talbot Mills 1–10 Mar 2025	39	43	13	12	8	6*	0	0	121	Labour–Greens–Māori (62)
Taxpayers' Union–Curia 2–4 Mar 2025	42	42	12	10	6	8	0	0	120	Labour–Greens–Māori (62)
Roy Morgan 27 Jan – 23 Feb 2025	38	36	20	14	8	6**	0	0	122	Labour–Greens–Māori (62)
1 News–Verian 3–7 Feb 2025	43	42	13	11	6	6*	0	0	121	Labour–Greens–Māori (61)
Taxpayers' Union–Curia 2–4 Feb 2025	39	39	16	12	8	6	0	0	120	Labour–Greens–Māori (61)
Talbot Mills 7–27 Jan 2025	40	42	15	11	6	6	0	0	120	Labour–Greens–Māori (63)
Roy Morgan 2–26 Jan 2025	40	36	14	11	11	8	0	0	120	National–ACT–NZ First (62)
Taxpayers' Union–Curia 9–13 Jan 2025	38	39	12	14	10	7	0	0	120	National–ACT–NZ First (62)
Roy Morgan 25 Nov – 15 Dec 2024	39	32	17	16	9	7	0	0	120	National–ACT–NZ First (64)
1 News–Verian 30 Nov – 4 Dec 2024	46	36	12	10	7	9	0	0	120	National–ACT–NZ First (63)
Taxpayers' Union–Curia 1–3 Dec 2024	44	34	11	17	7	7	0	0	120	National–ACT (61)
Labour–Talbot Mills 22–28 Nov 2024	39	40	12	12	8	9	0	0	120	Labour–Greens–Māori (61)
The Post/Freshwater Strategy 26–27 Nov 2024	42	39	16	10	8	6*	0	0	121	Labour–Greens–Māori (61)
Roy Morgan 28 Oct – 24 Nov 2024	37	36	17	11	8	11	0	0	120	Labour–Greens–Māori (64)
Taxpayers' Union–Curia 6–10 Nov 2024	48	39	11	11	8	6***	0	0	123	National–ACT–NZ First (67)
Talbot Mills 1–10 Nov 2024	42	41	12	12	9	6**	0	0	122	National–ACT–NZ First (63)
Roy Morgan 23 Sep – 20 Oct 2024	39	37	18	11	9	6	0	0	120	Labour–Greens–Māori (61)
1 News–Verian 5–9 Oct 2024	47	37	15	10	6	6*	0	0	121	National–ACT–NZ First (63)
Taxpayers' Union–Curia 3–7 Oct 2024	44	38	13	12	9	6**	0	0	122	National–ACT–NZ First (65)
Roy Morgan 26 Aug – 22 Sep 2024	47	29	17	13	9	6*	0	0	121	National–ACT–NZ First (69)
Taxpayers' Union–Curia 8–10 Sep 2024	48	33	14	11	8	6	0	0	120	National–ACT–NZ First (67)
Talbot Mills 1–10 Sep 2024	46	39	12	10	8	6*	0	0	121	National–ACT–NZ First (64)
Roy Morgan 29 Jul – 25 Aug 2024	45	33	16	12	9	6*	0	0	121	National–ACT–NZ First (66)
1 News–Verian 10–14 Aug 2024	49	38	14	8	7	6**	0	0	122	National–ACT–NZ First (64)
Roy Morgan 24 Jun – 21 Jul 2024	41	31	18	14	8	8	0	0	120	National–ACT–NZ First (63)
Taxpayers' Union–Curia 4–8 Jul 2024	47	33	16	11	9	6**	0	0	122	National–ACT–NZ First (67)
Roy Morgan 27 May – 23 Jun 2024	44	35	18	11	7	6*	0	0	121	National–ACT–NZ First (62)
1 News–Verian 15–19 Jun 2024	47	36	16	9	8	6**	0	0	122	National–ACT–NZ First (64)
Taxpayers' Union–Curia 4–6 Jun 2024	44	36	16	12	7	6*	0	0	121	National–ACT–NZ First (63)
Roy Morgan 22 Apr – 19 May 2024	42	38	17	12	7	6**	0	0	122	Hung parliament
Taxpayers' Union–Curia 5–7 May 2024	47	37	13	12	7	6**	0	0	122	National–ACT–NZ First (66)
Talbot Mills 30 Apr 2024	42	41	15	9	8	6*	0	0	121	Labour–Greens–Māori (62)
1 News–Verian 20–24 Apr 2024	48	40	18	9	0	6*	0	0	121	Labour–Greens–Māori (64)
Roy Morgan 25 Mar – 21 Apr 2024	45	31	16	14	7	7	0	0	120	National–ACT–NZ First (66)
Taxpayers' Union–Curia 2–4 Apr 2024	47	32	18	9	8	6	0	0	120	National–ACT–NZ First (64)
Roy Morgan 29 Jan – 25 Feb 2024	45	27	19	15	9	5	0	0	120	National–ACT–NZ First (69)
Talbot Mills 1–10 Feb 2024	47	35	15	9	8	6	0	0	120	National–ACT–NZ First (64)
Taxpayers' Union–Curia 1–7 Feb 2024	49	34	11	17	6	6***	0	0	123	National–ACT (66)
Roy Morgan 8–28 Jan 2024	49	28	20	10	7	6	0	0	120	National–ACT–NZ First (66)
Roy Morgan Dec 2023 poll	46	28	20	12	8	8**	0	0	122	National–ACT–NZ First (66)
Curia 3–5 Dec 2023 poll	46	36	14	8	10	6	0	0	120	National–ACT-NZ First (64)
Taxpayers' Union–Curia 1–6 Nov 2023 poll	46	35	17	10	8	6**	0	0	122	National–ACT–NZ First (64)
2023 election result 14 Oct 2023	48	34	15	11	8	6**	0	0	122	National–ACT–NZ First (67)

* indicates an overhang seat

== Voting ==
Sign at Wellington railway station, pointing towards a voting place

Enrolments closed on 26 October, with advance voting beginning on the same day. By 24 October, 92.4% of eligible voters had registered to vote. During the 2023 general election, 94.7% of eligible voters had enrolled by election day; which was previously the closing date for enrolment. On 29 October, the Electoral Commission referred two people to police after claims they had voted multiple times. Under Section 215 of the Electoral Act 1993, it is an offence to vote more than once.

On 30 October, the Electoral Commission acknowledged that about 6,800 voters holding residency class visas had wrongfully been asked to provide information about their immigration status when enrolling to vote; which is not legally required under New Zealand law. Chief Electoral Commissioner Karl Le Quesne said that the Commission would investigate the matter urgently and would contact affected people to reassure them that their enrolment application is sufficient.

By 3 November, the Electoral Commission confirmed that 1,074,416 had cast early votes, with 159,994 voting on 2 November alone. During the 2023 New Zealand general election, 860,668 people had cast an early vote at that stage. These statistics do not include overseas voters. In the week leading up to polling day on 7 November, the Electoral Commission was operating 600 voting places, with 2,300 expected to open on polling day.

On 4 November, the Electoral Commission added about 6,300 people to the electoral roll after an enrolment eligibility issue for residency-class visa holders the previous week prevented these eligible voters from enrolling. The Commission also acknowledged that 1,200 ineligible temporary visa holders and those with expired visas had been accidentally added to the electoral roll. Le Quesne said that the Electoral Commission would inform both categories of affected voters in writing, with ineligible voters being removed from the roll before the official count commences on 7 November.

On 8 November, the Electoral Commission confirmed that 74.6% of eligible voters (2,831,768) had voted during the 2026 general election; compared with 78.2% (2,850,527) during the 2023 general election. The 2026 figure includes 2,432,403 ordinary votes and an estimated 399,365 special votes (including 96,947 overseas votes). Advance voting made up a higher proportional of the overall vote at 67.3%, compared with 61.4% in 2023. 93.7% of eligible voters were enrolled to vote in 2026, compared with 94.7% in 2023.

Te Pāti Māori claimed that some polling places ran out of ballot papers for the Māori electorates, and that some Māori voters were turned away as a result. The Electoral Commission denies that any polling places were unable to issue ballots.

== Results ==
A preliminary count of ordinary votes took place on election day, 7 November. Most ordinary votes cast in advance were counted from 9:00 am under secure conditions, while ordinary votes cast on election day were counted after polling places close at 7:00 pm. Preliminary results were released progressively from 7:00 pm as polling places reported their counts and advance vote results became available. The Electoral Commission aimed to have 50% of polling places reporting by 10:00 pm and 95% by 11:30 pm. Special votes were not counted on election night.

After votes were counted on election night, voting papers and electoral rolls were returned that night to their respective electorate returning officers. For special votes, this process that can take up to ten days. A master electoral roll will be compiled to identify any instances of multiple voting, and special votes will be processed and checked. All votes will then undergo an official count. The Electoral Commission is scheduled to declare the official results on 27 November 2026, 20 days after the election.

Preliminary results of the 7 November 2026 election for the House of Representatives
Party	Party vote				Electorate vote sum				Total seats	+/-
Party	Votes	Of total (%)	Change (pp)	Seats	Votes	Of total (%)	Change (pp)	Seats	Total seats	+/-
National	706,680	29.21	▼8.86	0	992,314	41.26	▼2.21	42	42	▼6
Labour	710,330	29.36	▲2.45	15	812,660	33.79	▲2.58	21	36	▲2
Green	321,902	13.30	▲1.70	14	214,064	8.90	▲0.64	2	16	▲1
ACT	264,121	10.92	▲2.28	12	90,296	3.76	▼1.70	1	13	▲2
NZ First	236,630	9.78	▲3.70	12	120,618	5.02	▲2.22	0	12	▲4
Opportunity	144,298	5.96	▲3.74	7	52,913	2.20	▲1.18	0	7	▲7
Te Pāti Māori	13,845	0.57	▼2.51	0	81,682	3.40	▼0.49	5	5	▼1
Legalise Cannabis	4,829	0.19	▼0.26	0	4,880	0.20	▼0.26	0	0	Steady
Outdoors	2,685	0.11		0	3,214	0.13		0	0	Steady
Animal Justice	2,585	0.10	▼0.07	0	2,881	0.12	▼0.09	0	0	Steady
Conservative	1,886	0.07	▼0.08	0	651	0.03	▼0.09	0	0	Steady
Women's Rights	1,856	0.07	▼0.01	0	0	0.00	0.00	0	0	Steady
NZ Loyal	1,855	0.07	▼1.13	0	3,239	0.14	▼1.04	0	0	Steady
Vision New Zealand	1,529	0.06		0	857	0.04		0	0	Steady
Te Tai Tokerau	1,217	0.05		0	4,059	0.17		0	0	new
Free Palestine	1,168	0.04		0	136	0.01		0	0	new
Alliance	1,149	0.04		0	1,572	0.07		0	0	new
Independent					18,734	0.78	▼0.47	0	0	Steady
Valid votes	2,418,565				2,404,770					
Informal votes	13,838	0.49			27,633	0.98				
Disallowed votes										
Special votes	399,365	14.10			399,365	14.10				
Total	2,831,768	100.00		60	2,831,768	100.00		71	131	
Eligible voters and turnout	3,796,891	74.58								

== Aftermath ==
=== Prediction ===
David Farrar, who runs the polling company Curia, has modelled the 2026 special votes based on the 2023 specials. He predicts that the Green Party will win one list seat from the Labour Party, and that Wellington Bays will fall to the Greens – that electorate has been won by Labour's Craig Renney based on preliminary results. He said it is plausible that the Greens win a seat off NZ First instead of Labour, and that Kieran McAnulty could win the Wairarapa electorate instead of National's Mike Butterick. In that case, the current coalition would be at 65 seats, not enough to govern without the support of the Opportunity Party.

On 16 November 2026, Luxon confirmed that he had spoken with the leaders of the ACT, NZ First and Opportunity parties but that he would not commence negotiations until final results are released on 27 November. On 18 November, Seymour expressed disagreement with Luxon's decision to delay negotiations until the publication of the final vote count, stating "Having had a late election and a long vote count, the only way to get clarity early and stability for three years is to start as soon as possible."

=== Electoral system and strategies ===
Following the release of preliminary results on 8 November 2026, former Prime Minister and Labour leader Helen Clark called for a thorough review of New Zealand's electoral, campaign funding and voting laws, saying "this outcome is not what MMP is designed to deliver – which was a proportional result." She also said that the early closure of the enrolment date before early voting on 26 October disenfranchised many people. Clark also said that the use of strategic voting by various parties created an "overhang" result which distorted Parliament's proportionality. She also called for more transparency over the funding of election campaigns, citing the influence of big donors like Harry Mowbray in "gaming" the electoral system.

Similar criticism was echoed by Greens co-leader Chlöe Swarbrick, who said that the National-led government's electoral law changes around the enrolment date amounted to "voter suppression" and accused Prime Minister Luxon of lying about enrolment rates in the 2026 election. Meanwhile, Labour leader Chris Hipkins proposed that Parliament amend electoral legislation to deal with overhangs. Outgoing National cabinet minister Chris Bishop, who was unseated during the 2026 election, criticised the vote splitting campaigns run by Te Pāti Māori, Mowbray and other elements for "gaming the system" and confusing voters. In response to criticism of the Government's electoral law changes ending election day enrollments, Luxon said it would have taken the Electoral Commission four or five weeks instead of three weeks to count votes without the law change.

In mid-November 2026, a group of 46 experts led by University of Otago law professor Andrew Geddis, Victoria University of Wellington political scientist Lara Greaves and journalist Max Rashbrooke issued an open letter entitled "titled "Keep the 'P' in MMP" urging politicians to improve the Mixed Member Proportional system to avoid undemocratic elections in the future. The letter's writers proposed retaining MMP while tweaking the system to prevent parties from gaming it to create a parliamentary overhang. They proposed several options including increasing the number of list seats in Parliament, reducing the number of electorates, removing electorate seats from parties that win too many overhang seats, replacing the two-votes system with a one-vote system so that electorate votes also counted as party votes, and changing the allocation of votes in Parliament from the number of MPs to the proportion of party votes. Former National MP Nick Smith remarked that parties on both the left and right tended to complain when the election did not deliver favourable results and expressed concern about governments rewriting electoral rules to benefit their parties. He recommended that electoral laws require a 75% parliamentary majority to pass into law.

=== Vote counting errors ===
On 19 November 2026, the Electoral Commission acknowledged that two votes for the Opportunity Party at an Arrowtown voting booth that were incorrectly attributed to a different party. The Commission told The New Zealand Herald that a data entry error occurred on election night and that this was corrected during the standard official count process.
