= School lunches in New Zealand =

Free school meals have been provided to low-income students in New Zealand through the Ka Ora, Ka Ako (Health School Lunches) programme since 2020. In 2023, the Sixth National Government Of New Zealand, a coalition of the conservative National Party, Act Party and New Zealand First Party, came to government, ushering in funding cuts to the programme. The changes to the programme faced numerous issues. The program faced additional controversy when the Prime Minister made a comment criticised as insensitive and lacking appreciation of the state of poverty in some parts of the country. On 1 March, the Prime Minister indicated that the programme was experiencing "teething issues" but reiterating his confidence in the relevant Minister to address them. In October 2025, the Government dropped the programme's Māori name but retained its English name.

== Origins ==
In 2012, Māori Party Member of Parliament Hone Harawira had a private member's bill to provide free breakfast and lunches for all children in decile 1 and 2 schools in New Zealand drawn from the ballot. The Education (Breakfast and Lunch Programmes in Schools) Amendment Bill, better known as the "Feed the Kids Bill", was supported by a broad-based Community Coalition for Food in Schools. A 1News opinion poll found 70 percent support for the Bill's proposal.

== Sixth Labour Government ==
Until 2020, New Zealand did not have any school meal programme, aside from board-run school breakfasts that were not provided by central government. After assuming office, New Zealand's Labour-led government announced 20,000 children would benefit from school lunches by 2021. Jacinda Ardern has said this programme will be dramatically expanded to 200,000 students by the end of 2021 (25% of national school rolls) should she retain office. By May 2023, the Government's NZ$130 million Ka Ora, Ka Ako free lunch school programme fed over 220,000 students at 989 schools, reaching a quarter of all school students in New Zealand, at a cost of around $350 million a year.

== Sixth National Government ==
Following the 2023 New Zealand general election, a right-wing National-led coalition government was formed. In early March 2024, ACT party leader David Seymour announced that the National-led government would review the "Ka Ora, Ka Ako" school lunch programme, claiming without evidence that it did little to improve school attendance and academic achievement. Several school leaders including Porirua College deputy principal John Topp and attendance officer Mose Skipworth and the health advocacy group Health Coalition Aotearoa expressed concerns that Government plans to scrap or reduce the programme would worsen child poverty and poor educational outcomes. Seymour was also the target of protest action by students at Freyberg High School due to the Government's school lunch review.

=== Cuts in the programme ===
On 1 May 2024, Seymour confirmed the Government would continue to fund the "Ka Ora, Ka Ako" programme for a few years until the completion of the programme's review. On 8 May, Seymour released details of the Government's revised school lunch programme. The school meal programme would be expanded to include 10,000 pre-school pre-schoolers in low-equity, non-profit early childhood centres. While the primary school lunch programme would remain the same, the Government would purchase school lunch supplies in bulk for intermediate and secondary schools, with an emphasis on simpler foodstuffs such as sandwiches and fruits rather than sushi, quinoa, couscous, and hummus. In response, Labour's education spokesperson Jan Tinetti welcomed the retention of the school lunch programme but expressed concerns about changes to the secondary school lunch programme. Health Coalition Aotearoa co-hair Professor Boyd Swinburn questioned the nutritional value of bulk-purchased foods while Dish Magazine editor Sarah Tuck defended the nutritional value of quinoa and sushi.

On 22 October 2024, Seymour unveiled the Government's revised "Ka ora, Ka ako" free school lunch programme, which would be launched in Term 1 2024. Seymour said that the revamped programme would save NZ$130 million a year, with meals costing an average of NZ$3. Meals would consist of chicken katsu, butter chicken, lasagne, chicken pasta salad and wraps. Meals for students in Years 0 to 9 would be an average of 240 grams while meals for older students would be at least 300g with additional items including fruit, yoghurt or muesli bars. Schools would receive funding and resources to either prepare their meals internally, via iwi/hapū providers, or external suppliers including Gilmours, Foodstuffs, Watties and Hellers.

=== Quality and delivery issues ===
In late January 2025, the New Zealand Ministry of Education confirmed that the "Ka Oa Ka Ako" programme served 244,144 students and 1,014 schools. During the opening of the 2025 school year between late January and early February 2025, several schools including Auckland Girls' Grammar School, McAuley High School, Henderson Intermediate School, Kaitao Intermediate School and Massey Primary School reported problems with the revamped school lunch programme including late or missed deliveries, uncooked food, lack of nutrition, food wastage, ham in halal food and a shortage of vegetarian meals. Due to quality issues, some schools were forced to use their own funds to buy replacement meals for pupils.

=== Compass Group ===
On 31 January 2025, food provider Compass Group managing director Paul Harvey acknowledged there were problems with the company's gas ovens in Ellerslie and said that the company would reimburse schools that had to buy their own food. The Education Ministry leader of operations and integration Sean Teddy said the Ministry would work with the School Lunch Collective to address outstanding issues at the start of the school year. In response, Associate Education Minister Seymour apologised for "teething issues" in the rollout of the revised school lunch programme and attributed the delays to operational issues behind delivering large amounts of meals. Seymour accepted the school lunch scheme needed improvements but defended cost-cutting measures as necessary to saving taxpayer money. By contrast, Labour's education spokesperson Jan Tinetti criticised the National-led government for prioritising tax cuts over proper nutrition for children.

=== School Lunch Collective ===
In late February 2025, Seymour rejected calls to sack school lunch provider School Lunch Collective and argued that the current school lunch programme was better than Labour's iteration. On 1 March, Prime Minister Luxon said that the school lunch programme was experiencing "teething issues" and expressed confidence in Seymour's management of the problem. On 4 March, Luxon attracted controversy after suggesting that parents who were dissatisfied with the school lunch programme "make a marmite sandwich and put an apple in a bag". Luxon's remarks drew criticism from Hora Hora School principal and Tai Tokerau Principals' Association spokesman Pat Newman, Child Poverty Action Group executive officer Sarita Divis, East Otago High School principal Helen Newcombe, who argued that school lunches were needed to improve the health, educational and social outcomes of students. In response, Luxon defended his remarks and reiterated the Government's commitment to resolving problems with the school lunch programme.

On 4 March, the Ministry for Primary Industries launched an investigation into School Lunch Collective meals after children were served meals with melted plastic packaging.

=== Libelle Group in liquidation ===
On 11 March, the Libelle Group went into liquidation. The company had been contracted by the Compass Group to provide 125,000 meals to the Government's "Ka Ora, Ka Ako" school meal programme. On 12 March, Radio New Zealand reported that the School Lunch Collective had turned to Australian providers to address the shortfall caused by Libelle's liquidation. On 25 March, Māori lawyer Tania Waikato launched a petition calling upon the Government to cancel the Compass Group's school lunch contract, saying that the company had failed to meet its obligations. Waikato argued that the decision to remove contracts from local providers ignored the Māori values of manaakitanga (hospitality) and community care. On 31 March, a study at the Public Health Communication Centre found that the nutritional value of the School Lunch Collective's meals was between 13 and 17.8 percentage of daily energy requirements, short of the 30% standard for other developed countries.

=== Primary schools ===
On 7 November 2025, associate education minister Seymour confirmed that it had contracted ten suppliers to deliver lunches to 52,000 students in 188 primary schools from Term One 2026. These meals would cost $3, bringing them in line with intermediate and secondary schools which shifted to the cheaper meals in Term One 2025. These ten suppliers are Appresso Pro Foods, Montana Group, Ka Pai Kai, KDJ Catering, Cafe Mahia, Star Fresh, the University of Canterbury Student Association, Knuckles, The Y Gisborne, Pita Pit and Subway.

=== December 2025 Haeata food poisoning incident ===
On 1 December 2025, Haeata Community Campus reported that a batch of school lunches provided by School Lunch Collective contractor Compass Group were "mouldy and liquefied." The school's principal Peggy Burrows reported that several students had experienced diarrhoea and food poisoning. The Collective and Ministry for Primary Industries launched an investigation with the school. In response to media coverage, associate education minister David Seymour labelled Burrows a "frequent flyer in the media" and accused the principal of frequently criticising government policies. In response, Labour Party leader Chris Hipkins said that Seymour was shifting blame from himself to Burrows for "blowing the whistle." On 2 December, New Zealand Food Safety (NZFS) suggested that the contaminated meals had been delivered by the Compass Group on the previous Thursday (27 November) and had not been properly refrigerated. The health watchdog suggested that school staff had accidentally served the contaminated meals along with fresh food. Burrows disputed this account, stating that Haeata Community Campus did not have facilities to heat food and that Compass delivered hot meals during lunchtime. School Lunch Collective spokesperson Paul Harbey said that Compass supported Food Safety's account, stating that they company had delivered nine food storage boxes on 27 November and had only received eight containers back.

On 10 December, an investigation by NZFS cleared the School Lunch Collective of wrongdoing, concluding that meals which had been delivered the previous week were accidentally mixed with hot meals that were served on 1 December. The investigators determined that it was unlikely that the School Lunch Collective had accidentally delivered contaminated meals on 1 December. NZFS made eight recommendations around procedures for distributing school meals. In response, Principal Burrows confirmed that Haeata Community Campus had received Food Safety's report and would review it alongside its own internal investigation, which is due on 12 December.

In early February 2026, Haeata Community Campus released its own internal investigation which challenged NZFS's finding that the contaminated meals came from the school. In response, NZFS deputy director-general Vincent Arbuckle defended his agency's investigation and said that Haeata's report did not introduce any new evidence.

=== 2026 revamp ===
In mid-February 2026, Newstalk ZB reported that the New Zealand Cabinet had decided in October 2025 to drop the school lunch programme's Māori name Ka Ora, Ka Ako and solely use its English name "Health School Lunches." Associate Education Minister Seymour justified the revamp on the grounds that people were more familiar with the English name. By contrast, Green MP Teanau Tuiono described the move as "racist, pathetic and anti-Māori."

On 15 May 2026, the Government allocated NZ$212 million from the 2026 New Zealand budget to continuing the Healthy School Lunches programme for the 2027 school year. Seymour indicated that the Government would make changes to the programme for the 2028 school year.

=== 2026 Auditor General's report ===
On 30 June 2026, a report by the Auditor-General on the Government's school lunches programme was tabled in Parliament. While the report found that the National-led government's programme saved money compared with Labour's approach, it expressed concern that the Government was unable to show how it was delivering its aims. It also expressed concern that the school lunch programme had weak back-up planning and that last-minute changes had been made after the Government had signed a two-year $85 million per year contract with the School Lunch Collective in October 2024. The report found that the National-led government had agreed to a $3-per-meal contract despite officials warning that it might not meet the nutritional needs of children and could create complications for schools with multiple age groups. In response, associate education minister Seymour defended the Government's school lunch programme, saying "Actually, we drove a hard bargain, we got a good deal." He also suggested that upset Education Ministry and former providers who had lost their contacts had influenced the Auditor-General's report. By contrast, Labour's education spokesperson Ginny Andersen said that if Labour won the 2026 New Zealand general election, it would restore the previous school lunch programme which involved working with local providers. Similarly, the Green Party said it would restore the programme and expand it to 400 schools if elected into government.

=== Public opinion ===
On 1 April 2025, an RNZ-Reid Research poll found that 61.5% of respondents believed that parents should be responsible for providing school lunches. By comparison, 32.4 percent said the government via a school lunch programme, 2.5 percent said other and 3.6 percent said they did not know. This poll was conducted between 21 and 27 March 2025 via online interviews and surveyed 1,000 people. While National Party leader Luxon and ACT leader Seymour said that parents should be responsible for providing school lunches, the Green Party's co-leader Marama Davidson and Te Pāti Māori co-leader Debbie Ngarewa-Packer said that the government should fund the school lunch programme in cooperation with local schools and communities. Labour leader Chris Hipkins said parents should be responsible for providing school lunches but defended the need for a school lunch programme. The survey found that those on the lowest incomes were more likely to name parents as being responsible for school lunches while those on the highest incomes were more likely to designate the government. Following the survey, Child Poverty Action Group deputy chair Rich Griessman urged the Government to see the school lunch programme as an investment rather than just a service.
