= Free Palestine Party (New Zealand) =

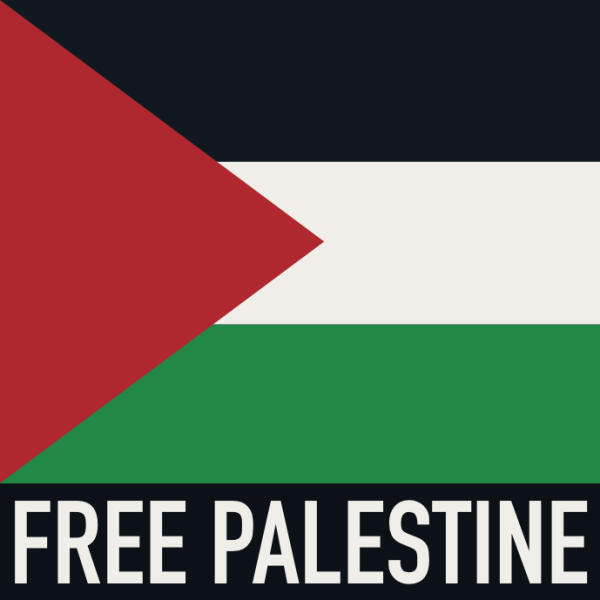
- Leader: Paul Hopkinson
- Secretary: John Edmundson
- Founded: 2026
- Ideology: Anti-Zionism; Single-issue politics
- MPs in the House of Representatives: 0 / 120

Website
- palfree.nz

The Free Palestine or Palestine Free from the River to the Sea Party is a registered political party in New Zealand. The party seeks to highlight and support the Palestinian cause in the 2026 New Zealand general election. It is led by Paul Hopkinson, the national leader of the Palestine Solidarity Campaign and an ex-member of the revolutionary socialist Workers Party of New Zealand.

== History ==
The party was founded in May 2026. In May, the Electoral Commission allocated the party $78,887 in broadcasting funding, contingent upon its registration. The party applied for registration in June 2026. The party was registered on 5 August 2026, but its proposed logo was declined.

Based on preliminary results, during the 2026 New Zealand general election held on 7 November, the Free Palestine Party received 1,168 party votes (0.04%), below the five percent threshold needed to enter Parliament.

== Policy ==
The Free Palestine Party supports a one-state solution to the Israeli–Palestinian conflict, and opposes Zionism. However, it seeks to "unite... supporters of Palestine from all traditions."

Hopkinson believes that the October 7 attacks were partially justified.

== Election results ==
Election	Candidates nominated		# of seats won	# of party votes	% of party vote
Election	Electorate	List	# of seats won	# of party votes	% of party vote
2026	1	6	TBD	TBD	TBD

== See also ==
- Free Palestine Party
