= Mohan Dutta =

New Zealand communication scholar

Mohan J. Dutta
- Occupations: Communication scholar, author
- Title: Dean's Chair Professor of Communication; director, CARE

Academic background
- Education: B.Tech. in agricultural engineering, M.A. in mass communication, Ph.D. in mass communication
- Alma mater: Indian Institute of Technology Kharagpur, North Dakota State University, University of Minnesota

Academic work
- Institutions: Massey University, Public Health Foundation of India

Mohan J. Dutta is a communication scholar based in New Zealand. He is Dean's Chair Professor of Communication at Massey University and director of the Center for Culture-Centered Approach to Research and Evaluation (CARE). His work develops a culture-centred approach to communication that partners with marginalised communities in health and social policy contexts.

== Education ==
Dutta studied agricultural engineering at the Indian Institute of Technology Kharagpur. He completed a master's degree in mass communication at North Dakota State University and a Ph.D. in mass communication at the University of Minnesota.

== Career ==
Dutta has held academic posts in the United States and Asia before moving to New Zealand. He joined Massey University in 2018 as Dean's Chair Professor of Communication and directs CARE, which undertakes community-engaged projects on health, inequality and social change. He also hosts the International Communication Association podcast Interventions from the Global South.

== Research and public engagement ==
Dutta's research examines communication, health inequities and social justice. He is known for the culture-centred approach, which places community voice at the centre of research and policy design. His public work has included writing on Hindu nationalism and racism. A 2021–2022 series of reports and commentary on Hindutva drew organised online harassment, which was covered by The New Zealand Herald, and led to successful complaints he brought to the New Zealand Media Council about a community news site's coverage.

== Controversies ==
In September 2025, after the assassination of U.S. conservative activist Charlie Kirk, Dutta posted several comments on social media. On X (formerly Twitter) he wrote, "Charlie Kirk is a white supremacist far right figure. That there was an attempt to pay homage to him in the NZ parliament should give you ...", and urged followers to "challenge the white supremacist propaganda turning the white supremacist Charlie Kirk into a martyr and a promoter of free speech". The comments drew criticism from some New Zealand figures, including National MP Joseph Mooney, and prompted media coverage calling the remarks inflammatory. Dutta defended his posts as commentary on white supremacist politics and said he opposed violence.

Kirk's assassination, which occurred on 10 September 2025 during an event in Utah, sparked global political reaction and a disinformation wave documented by international media. Coverage also noted wider disputes over speech following the killing.

== Selected works ==
Dutta's books include Communicating Health: A Culture-Centered Approach, Communicating Social Change: Structure, Culture, and Agency, Neoliberal Health Organizing, and Imagining India in Discourse: Meaning, Power, Structure.

== Podcasts ==
- Interventions from the Global South (host)
