= Greymouth Petroleum =

New Zealand oil and gas company

Greymouth Petroleum is an energy company in New Zealand, established in 2002. It owns gas and oil fields, principally in onshore Taranaki, including Kowhai and Turangi in the north of the basin, and smaller fields such as Ngatoro and Kaimiro to the south, mainly delivering gas into industrial customers served by the Maui pipeline as well as Methanex locally. In 2002 it acquired the Kaimiro and Ngatoro fields from Shell Energy. In 2008 it acquired the New Zealand assets of Swift Energy. In 2018, it lodged a court challenge to the New Zealand government's ban on issuing new offshore oil and gas exploration permits.

In 2019, following a court case, it surrendered the non-producing parts of its Kowhai mining permit.

Greymouth is the operator of Moturoa, the oldest field in New Zealand.

Despite its name, the company has no connection to the township of Greymouth in the West Coast Region of the South Island.
