= Opinion polling for the 2026 New Zealand general election =

Eight polling firms have conducted opinion polls during the term of the 54th New Zealand Parliament (2023–2026) for the 2026 New Zealand general election. The regular polls are the quarterly polls produced by Television New Zealand (1 News), conducted by Verian (formerly known as Colmar Brunton and Kantar Public), Radio New Zealand (RNZ), conducted by Reid Research, and The Post, conducted by Freshwater Strategy, along with monthly polls by Roy Morgan and by Curia (Taxpayers' Union). Curia Market Research is no longer a member of the Research Association of New Zealand, following complaints and the resignation from RANZ by its principal, David Farrar. The sample size, margin of error, and confidence interval of each poll varies by organisation and date.

The parliament was elected on 14 October 2023. The general election took place on 7 November 2026.

== Party vote ==
The parties shown in this section are National (NAT), Labour (LAB), Green (GRN), ACT, New Zealand First (NZF), Te Pāti Māori (TPM), and the Opportunity Party (OPP). Other parties may have also registered in some polls, but are not listed in this section.

=== Graphical summary ===
Graph of opinion polls in NZ by party. Smoothed trendlines fitted using LOWESS regression (bandwidth = 0.35). Up-to-date as of 4 November 2026.

Graph of opinion polls in NZ by party, excluding Labour and National. Smoothed trendlines fitted using LOWESS regression (bandwidth = 0.35). Up-to-date as of 4 November 2026.

Graph of opinion polls in NZ by main party blocs. Smoothed trendlines fitted using LOWESS regression (bandwidth = 0.35). Up-to-date as of 4 November 2026.

=== Table of polls ===
Date (Note: These are the survey dates of the poll, or if the survey dates are not stated, the date the poll was released.)	Polling organisation	Sample size	NAT	LAB	GRN	ACT	NZF	TPM	OPP	Others	Lead
7 Nov 2026	2026 preliminary election result	N/A	29.21	29.36	13.3	10.92	9.78	0.56	5.96	0.85	0.15
29 Oct – 3 Nov 2026	The Post/Freshwater Strategy	1,044	26.4	30.7	13	9.8	12	2	5.1	1	4.3
28 Oct – 3 Nov 2026	Taxpayers' Union–Curia	1,000	28.9	28.4	14.4	10.5	9.8	1.1	5.8	1.1 (Note: Animal Justice Party 0.3% Free Palestine Party 0.2% Alliance 0.2% NZ Outdoors & Freedom Party 0.2% Aotearoa Legalise Cannabis Party 0.1% Conservative 0.1%)	0.5
29 Oct – 2 Nov 2026	1 News–Verian	1,006	29.5	28.8	16.4	10	8.4	0.4	6.2	0.2 (Note: Animal Justice Party 0.1% Free Palestine Party 0.1%)	0.7
26 Oct 2026	Advance voting begins for the 2026 New Zealand general election.										
20–26 Oct 2026	RNZ–Reid Research	1,000	24.8	30.6	14.5	10.1	9.9	1.9	7.2	0.9	5.8
21–25 Oct 2026	1 News–Verian	1,000	28.9	27.3	14.8	12.4	10	0.1	6.3	0.2 (Note: Vision NZ 0.2%)	1.6
28 Sep – 25 Oct 2026	Roy Morgan	859	26.5	27.5	15.5	11	10	1	8	0.5	1
15–19 Oct 2026	1 News–Verian	1,003	32	27	16	11	8	0.7	7	0.7 (Note: Aotearoa Legalise Cannabis Party 0.2% Animal Justice Party 0.2% Alliance 0.2% Women's Rights Party 0.1%)	5
9–19 Oct 2026	The Post/Freshwater Strategy	1,458	27.6	28.7	14.3	9	11.8	2	5.4	1.2	1.1
8–12 Oct 2026	1 News–Verian	1,007	28	28	15	10	10	0.4	8	1.6 (Note: Aotearoa Legalise Cannabis Party 0.5% Free Palestine Party 0.3% NZ Loyal 0.2% Alliance 0.2% Vision NZ 0.2% Animal Justice Party 0.1% NZ Outdoors & Freedom Party 0.1%)	Tie
6–10 Oct 2026	Anacta	1,352	28	29	15	9	10	1.9	5.4	–	1
1–5 Oct 2026	Taxpayers' Union–Curia	1,000	28.5	28.2	13.3	9.2	12	1.4	4.8	2.7 (Note: Women's Rights 0.9% Vision NZ 0.7% Conservative 0.3% NZ Loyal 0.3% Te Tai Tokerau 0.3% Free Palestine Party 0.2%)	0.3
1–5 Oct 2026	1 News–Verian	1,001	29	28	16	9	10	0.6	7	0.8 (Note: New Zealand Loyal 0.5% Women's Rights Party 0.2% Animal Justice Party 0.1%)	1
24 Sep – 1 Oct 2026	RNZ–Reid Research	1,000	25.9	30.8	14.8	9	10.6	2	5.5	0.7	4.9
23–27 Sep 2026	1 News–Verian	1,004	28	28	16	11	9	1.2	6	1 (Note: NZ Outdoors & Freedom Party 0.3% New Conservatives Party 0.2% Vision NZ 0.2% Aotearoa Legalise Cannabis Party 0.1% Women's Rights Party 0.1% Animal Justice Party 0.1%)	Tie
31 Aug – 27 Sep 2026	Roy Morgan	859	31	23.5	16	11	10	2	6.5	0	7.5
4–11 Sep 2026	The Post/Freshwater Strategy	1,011	26.5	28	13.6	8.7	12.6	2.2	6.3	2.1	1
4–10 Sep 2026	Anacta	1,701	30	31	12	8	10	2	7	–	1
1–3 Sep 2026	Taxpayers' Union–Curia	1,000	29	25.9	13.9	10.5	8.4	2	4.5	5.9	3.1
27 Jul – 23 Aug 2026	Roy Morgan	858	31	24	15.5	10.5	7.5	1.5	9.5	0.5	7
14–21 Aug 2026	RNZ–Reid Research	1,000	29.1	32.2	10.2	7.7	11.9	3.0	5.3	0.6	3.1
12 Aug 2026	Prime Minister and National Party leader Christopher Luxon survives a second party leadership vote.										
8–11 Aug 2026	1 News–Verian	847	29	30	12	9	8	1.1	8	2.7 (Note: New Zealand Loyal 0.6% Aotearoa Legalise Cannabis Party 0.5% Women's Rights Party 0.5% NZ Outdoors & Freedom Party 0.4% Free Palestine Party 0.3% Te Tai Tokerau Party 0.2% Animal Justice Party 0.1% New Conservatives Party 0.1%)	1
1–11 Aug 2026	Talbot Mills		29	34	8	7	13	3	5.2	–	5
1–4 Aug 2026	Taxpayers' Union–Curia	1,000	31	27.8	10.1	7.3	9.1	1.5	6.1	2.2 (Note: Women's Rights Party 1.4% New Conservatives Party 0.4% Vision NZ 0.3% NZ Outdoors & Freedom Party 0.1%)	3.2
29 Jun – 26 Jul 2026	Roy Morgan	881	32	25.5	13.5	8.5	8.5	2	8	2	6.5
10–19 Jul 2026	Talbot Mills		31	33	9	7	12	3	4.7	–	2
2–9 Jul 2026	RNZ–Reid Research	1,000	28.7	34	10.3	7.8	11.5	2.3	4.7	0.8	5.3
1–5 Jul 2026	Taxpayers' Union–Curia	1,000	30.5	31.5	10.4	6.9	10.8	3.4	3.3	3.2	1
25 May – 21 Jun 2026	Roy Morgan	891	31	25.5	13.5	9.5	10.5	3	6.5	0.5	5.5
13–17 Jun 2026	1 News–Verian	1,001	29	32	13	6	11	1.8	4.6	1.5 (Note: Animal Justice Party 0.6% New Conservatives Party 0.3% NZ Outdoors & Freedom Party 0.2% Women's Rights Party 0.2% Aotearoa Legalise Cannabis Party 0.1%)	3
5–11 Jun 2026	The Post/Freshwater Strategy	1,038	28.9	35.3	10.4	8.1	12	2.1	–	3.2	6.4
1–10 Jun 2026	Talbot Mills	1,021	29	34	13	6	12	2.6	3.3	–	5
4–8 Jun 2026	Taxpayers' Union–Curia	1,000	30.1	32.2	11.5	7.8	11.4	3.1	3.2	0.8 (Note: NZ Outdoors & Freedom Party 0.3% Vision NZ 0.3% New Conservatives Party 0.2%)	2.1
28 May 2026	Budget 2026 is delivered.										
27 Apr – 24 May 2026	Roy Morgan	870	30.5	26.5	12.5	10	11	2.5	6	1	4
11 May 2026	Mariameno Kapa-Kingi exits Te Pāti Māori to start Te Tai Tokerau Party.										
1–10 May 2026	Talbot Mills		29	36	9	7	14	2	–	–	7
3–7 May 2026	Taxpayers' Union–Curia	1,000	30	31.9	9.7	6.5	11.7	4.1	2.8	3.3 (Note: New Conservatives Party 0.8% NZ Outdoors & Freedom Party 0.5% Vision NZ 0.3%)	1.9
30 Mar – 26 Apr 2026	Roy Morgan	887	25.5	34	11	10.5	11.5	3	4	0.5	8.5
21 Apr 2026	Prime Minister and National Party leader Christopher Luxon survives a party leadership vote called by himself.										
16 Apr 2026	Talbot Mills	1,082	29	36	7	8	15	1.9	2.3	–	7
11–15 Apr 2026	1 News–Verian	1,010	30	37	11	7	10	1.5	3.3	1.2 (Note: New Conservatives Party 0.5% Animal Justice Party 0.4% NZ Outdoors & Freedom Party 0.3%)	7
1–2 Apr 2026	Taxpayers' Union–Curia	1,000	29.8	33.4	7.8	9	13.6	2.6	2.6	1.3	3.6
23 Feb – 22 Mar 2026	Roy Morgan	872	26.5	34	11	10	11	3	4	0.5	7.5
12–20 Mar 2026	RNZ–Reid Research	1,000	30.8	35.6	10.1	7	10.6	3.2	2	0.7	4.8
2–12 Mar 2026	Talbot Mills	1,059	32	35	11	7	11	1.7	2.4	–	3
1–3 Mar 2026	Taxpayers' Union–Curia	1,000	28.4	34.4	10.5	7.5	9.7	3.2	1.9	4.3 (Note: NZ Outdoors & Freedom Party 1.7% New Conservatives Party 0.8% Vision NZ 0.2%)	6
2 Mar 2026	The Strait of Hormuz is closed as part of the Iran war, causing an incoming fuel crisis affecting New Zealand.										
27 Jan – 22 Feb 2026	Roy Morgan	870	31	30	14.5	8	9.5	2.5	4	0.5	1
6–12 Feb 2026	The Post/Freshwater Strategy	1,039	30	37.4	10.2	6.4	10.5	2.5	–	3	7.4
7–11 Feb 2026	1 News–Verian	1,003	34	32	11	9	10	2	1	1.7 (Note: Aotearoa Legalise Cannabis Party 0.4% NewZeal 0.4% Women's Rights Party 0.3% NZ Outdoors & Freedom Party 0.2% New Conservatives Party 0.2% Vision NZ 0% Animal Justice Party 0.1%)	2
1–3 Feb 2026	Taxpayers' Union–Curia	1,000	31.3	34.1	10.3	6.7	10.5	2.9	1.4	4.2 (Note: NZ Outdoors & Freedom Party 1.2% New Conservatives Party 0.1% Vision NZ 0.4%)	2.8
6–26 Jan 2026	Roy Morgan	881	34.5	30.5	10.5	8.5	9	3	2.5	1.5	4
16–26 Jan 2026	Talbot Mills	1,087	31	35	10	8	9	3	–	–	4
15–22 Jan 2026	RNZ–Reid Research	1,000	31.9	35	9.6	7.6	9.8	3	2.3	0.9	3.1
21 Jan 2026	Prime Minister Christopher Luxon announces that the election will be held on 7 November 2026.										
14–18 Jan 2026	Taxpayers' Union–Curia	1,000	31.5	34.4	7.7	7	11.9	3	0.7	3.8 (Note: NZ Outdoors & Freedom Party 0.6% New Conservatives Party 0.3% Vision NZ 0.3%)	2.9
25 Nov – 21 Dec 2025	Roy Morgan	859	33	32.5	12	7.5	10	2.5	2.5	0	0.5
5–10 Dec 2025	The Post/Freshwater Strategy	1,031	30	38.4	8.4	7.7	9.1	2.5	–	4.3	8.4
5 Dec 2025	Mariameno Kapa-Kingi reinstated as a member of Te Pāti Māori by the High Court.										
3–7 Dec 2025	Taxpayers' Union–Curia	1,000	30	31.6	10.8	8.9	8.1	3.1	1.6	6 (Note: NZ Outdoors & Freedom Party 1% New Conservatives Party 1% Vision NZ 0.3%)	1.6
29 Nov – 3 Dec 2025	1 News–Verian	1,007	36	35	7	10	9	0.6	0.4	2.4 (Note: Aotearoa Legalise Cannabis Party 0.4% Women's Rights Party 0.2% NZ Outdoors & Freedom Party 0.4% New Conservatives Party 0.1% NewZeal 0.1% Vision NZ 0% Animal Justice Party 0%)	1
27 Oct – 23 Nov 2025	Roy Morgan	829	33	28	14.5	8	9	2	2.5	3	5
16 Nov 2025	Qiulae Wong becomes leader of The Opportunity Party.										
10 Nov 2025	Tākuta Ferris and Mariameno Kapa-Kingi are expelled from Te Pāti Māori.										
1–10 Nov 2025	Talbot Mills	1000	33	38	9	7	8	2.4	–	–	5
2–6 Nov 2025	Taxpayers' Union–Curia	1,000	30.2	33.3	9.2	8.6	9.1	3.3	1.2	5.1 (Note: NZ Outdoors & Freedom Party 1.5% New Conservatives Party 1.2% Vision NZ 0.4%)	3.1
29 Sep – 26 Oct 2025	Roy Morgan	857	32	30.5	12	8	9.5	2.5	2.5	3	1.5
1–10 Oct 2025	Talbot Mills	1,097	29	35	10	8	12	4	–	–	6
4–8 Oct 2025	1 News–Verian	1,014	34	32	11	8	9	2.8	0.8	2.4 (Note: Aotearoa Legalise Cannabis Party 0.5% Women's Rights Party 0.5% NZ Outdoors & Freedom Party 0.4% New Conservatives Party 0.3% NewZeal 0.2% Vision NZ 0.2% Animal Justice Party 0.1%)	2
3–8 Oct 2025	The Post/Freshwater Strategy	1,050	31	34	9	9	11	3	–	2	3
1–5 Oct 2025	Taxpayers' Union–Curia	1,000	29.6	31.2	12	6.6	10.6	4.4	1.6	4 (Note: Freedoms New Zealand 2.3% New Zealand Loyal 1% Vision NZ 0.6%)	1.6
25 Aug – 21 Sep 2025	Roy Morgan	870	31.5	28.5	13.5	9	8	5.5	2.5	1.5	3
4–12 Sep 2025	RNZ–Reid Research	1,000	32.5	34.3	10.9	7.2	8.7	4.1	1.4	0.9	1.8
1–10 Sep 2025	Talbot Mills	1,000	31	35	10	7	10	4	–	–	4
6 Sep 2025	Oriini Kaipara of Te Pāti Māori wins the Tāmaki Makaurau by-election.										
31 Aug – 2 Sep 2025	Taxpayers' Union–Curia	1,000	33.1	33.8	10.7	6.7	8.1	4.3	1.1	2.2 (Note: NZ Outdoors & Freedom Party 0.8% Vision NZ 0.6% New Conservatives Party 0.3%)	0.7
28 Jul – 24 Aug 2025	Roy Morgan	873	29	34	13.5	10.5	7	2.5	3	0.5	5
1–10 Aug 2025	Talbot Mills	1,000	32	34	11	8	9.3	4.4	2.8	–	2
2–6 Aug 2025	1 News–Verian	1,002	34	33	10	8	9	3.7	1.3	1 (Note: NewZeal 0.4% Women's Rights Party 0.4% New Conservatives Party 0.2% Animal Justice Party 0.1% Aotearoa Legalise Cannabis Party 0.1% NZ Outdoors & Freedom Party 0.1%)	1
3–5 Aug 2025	Taxpayers' Union–Curia	1,000	31.8	33.6	9.8	8.6	7.8	3.2	2.6	2.6 (Note: NZ Outdoors & Freedom Party 1.1% Vision NZ 0.4%)	1.8
30 Jun – 27 Jul 2025	Roy Morgan	832	31	31	11.5	10.5	9.5	3.5	1	2	Tie
1–10 Jul 2025	Talbot Mills	1,090	32	35	12	8	7	3.8	–	–	3
2–6 Jul 2025	Taxpayers' Union–Curia	1,000	33.9	31.6	9.4	9.1	9.8	3.5	1.2	1.5 (Note: New Conservatives Party 0.5% NZ Outdoors & Freedom Party 0.1%)	2.3
26 May – 22 Jun 2025	Roy Morgan	812	32	28.5	11	11.5	8	5	3	1	3.5
12–15 Jun 2025	The Post/Freshwater Strategy	1,150	32	34	11	8	8	2	–	4	2
7–9 Jun 2025	Taxpayers' Union–Curia	1,000	33.5	34.8	8.2	9.1	6.1	3.3	1.8	3.2 (Note: NZ Outdoors & Freedom Party 1.1% New Conservatives Party 0.7% Vision NZ 0.6%)	1.3
31 May 2025	David Seymour of the ACT party becomes Deputy Prime Minister, replacing Winston Peters of NZ First.										
23–30 May 2025	RNZ–Reid Research	1,008	30.7	33.2	11.6	6.6	9.1	5.5	2.2	1.1 (Note: New Conservatives Party 0.8%)	2.5
24–28 May 2025	1 News–Verian	1,002	34	29	12	8	8	3.7	1.3	3.9 (Note: NewZeal 1.3% NZ Outdoors & Freedom Party 1.1% Aotearoa Legalise Cannabis Party 0.6% New Conservatives Party 0.4% Vision NZ 0.2% Animal Justice Party 0.1%)	5
28 Apr – 25 May 2025	Roy Morgan	799	31.5	29	11.5	12	6.5	4.5	3	2	2.5
22 May 2025	Budget 2025 is delivered.										
30 Apr – 4 May 2025	Taxpayers' Union–Curia	1,000	34.6	33.2	9.1	9.5	7.4	3.9	0.5	1.8 (Note: NZ Outdoors & Freedom Party 0.4% Vision NZ 0.4%)	1.4
24 Mar – 20 Apr 2025	Roy Morgan	829	31	28.5	14	9	9	4.5	2.5	1.5	2.5
29 Mar – 2 Apr 2025	1 News–Verian	1,000	36	32	10	9	7	3.4	2.1	1.3 (Note: Freedoms New Zealand 0.5% NZ Outdoors & Freedom Party 0.4% Vision NZ 0.2% Animal Justice Party 0.2%)	4
29 Mar – 1 Apr 2025	Taxpayers' Union–Curia	1,000	33.5	29.8	11	10	7.4	4.3	1.5	1.4 (Note: NZ Outdoors & Freedom Party 1% New Conservatives Party 0.4%)	3.7
21–27 Mar 2025	RNZ–Reid Research	1,000	32.9	32.3	10	9.4	7.2	5	1.8	–	0.6
24 Feb – 23 Mar 2025	Roy Morgan	888	32.5	27.5	14.5	7.5	7	5.5	4	1.5	5
1–10 Mar 2025	Talbot Mills	1,003	31	34	10	10	6.1	4.4	–	–	3
2–4 Mar 2025	Taxpayers' Union–Curia	1,000	33.6	34.1	10	7.7	5.1	6.5	0.5	2.5 (Note: NZ Outdoors & Freedom Party 0.6% Vision NZ 0.4%)	0.5
27 Jan – 23 Feb 2025	Roy Morgan	888	30.5	29	15.5	11	6	3	2.5	2.5	1.5
3–7 Feb 2025	1 News–Verian	1,002	34	33	10	9	5	3.7	1.9	3.6 (Note: Freedoms New Zealand 1% Women's Rights Party 1% Vision NZ 0.5% NZ Outdoors & Freedom Party 0.3% Animal Justice Party 0.2% New Conservatives Party 0.2% NewZeal 0.2% Aotearoa Legalise Cannabis Party 0.1% New Nation Party 0.1%)	1
2–4 Feb 2025	Taxpayers' Union–Curia	1,000	31.9	31.3	13.2	10	6.4	4.4	0.5	2.2 (Note: NZ Outdoors & Freedom Party 0.9% New Conservatives Party 0.2%)	0.6
7–27 Jan 2025	Talbot Mills	1,049	33	34	12	9	5.2	4.6	–	–	1
2–26 Jan 2025	Roy Morgan	885	32.5	28.5	11.5	9	8.5	6.5	1.5	2	4
9–13 Jan 2025	Taxpayers' Union–Curia	1,000	29.6	30.9	9.5	10.8	8.1	5.3	2.1	3.7 (Note: NZ Outdoors & Freedom Party 1.7% Vision NZ 0.6%)	1.3
25 Nov – 15 Dec 2024	Roy Morgan	885	31	26	13.5	13	7.5	5.5	1	2.5	5
30 Nov – 4 Dec 2024	1 News–Verian	1,006	37	29	10	8	6	7	1.5	2 (Note: Aotearoa Legalise Cannabis Party 0.5% New Conservatives Party 0.4% Freedoms New Zealand 0.3% New Nation Party 0.3% Vision NZ 0.3% Women's Rights Party 0.2% NewZeal 0.1%)	8
1–3 Dec 2024	Taxpayers' Union–Curia	1,000	34.2	26.9	8.3	13	5.4	5.5	1.1	2.2 (Note: NZ Outdoors & Freedom Party 2% Vision NZ 0.2%)	7.3
22–28 Nov 2024	Labour–Talbot Mills		31	32	10	10	6	7	–	–	1
26–27 Nov 2024	The Post/Freshwater Strategy	1,150	34	31	13	8	6	4	–	–	3
28 Oct – 24 Nov 2024	Roy Morgan	866	28.5	28	13.5	9	6.5	9	3.5	2	0.5
10–19 Nov 2024	Hīkoi mō te Tiriti protest against the Treaty Principles Bill.										
6–10 Nov 2024	Taxpayers' Union–Curia	1,000	38.8	31.5	9.3	8.5	6.5	2.5	0.9	2.1	7.3
1–10 Nov 2024	Talbot Mills		34	33	10	10	7	3.3	–	–	1
23 Sep – 20 Oct 2024	Roy Morgan	883	31	29	14	9	7	5	2	3	2
5–9 Oct 2024	1 News–Verian	1,000	37	29	12	8	5	3.8	2.6	2.3 (Note: NewZeal 0.6% Aotearoa Legalise Cannabis Party 0.4% Animal Justice Party 0.3% New Conservatives Party 0.2% New Nation Party 0.2% Freedoms New Zealand 0.2% NZ Outdoors & Freedom Party 0.2% Vision NZ 0.2%)	8
3–7 Oct 2024	Taxpayers' Union–Curia	1,000	34.9	30.3	10.4	9.7	7.6	3	2.5	1.6	4.6
26 Aug – 22 Sep 2024	Roy Morgan	902	37.5	23	14	10	7.5	4	2.5	1.5	14.5
8–10 Sep 2024	Taxpayers' Union–Curia	1,000	39	26.7	11	8.8	6.8	5	1.1	2.4	12.3
1–10 Sep 2024	Talbot Mills		37	32	10	8	6.1	3.9	–	–	5
29 Jul – 25 Aug 2024	Roy Morgan	898	36	26.5	13	9.5	7.5	3.5	2.5	1.5	9.5
10–14 Aug 2024	1 News–Verian	1,001	38	30	11	7	6	4.2	1.1	2.8 (Note: NewZeal 0.7% New Conservatives Party 0.5% Animal Justice Party 0.3% DemocracyNZ 0.2% Aotearoa Legalise Cannabis Party 0.2% Democratic Alliance 0.1% Women's Rights Party 0.1% New Nation Party 0.1% NZ Outdoors & Freedom Party 0.1% Freedoms New Zealand 0.1% Others 0.4%)	8
24 Jun – 21 Jul 2024	Roy Morgan	930	32.5	24	14	11	6.5	6	4.5	1.5	8.5
4–8 Jul 2024	Taxpayers' Union–Curia	1,000	37.6	25.9	12.5	9.1	7.3	3.5	2.4	1.8 (Note: NZ Outdoors & Freedom Party 1.0% Others 0.8%)	11.7
27 May – 23 Jun 2024	Roy Morgan	930	35	27.5	14.5	9	5.5	3.5	2.5	2.5	7.5
15–19 Jun 2024	1 News–Verian	1,002	38	29	13	7	6	3.3	1.5	2.1 (Note: New Nation Party 0.6% Animal Justice Party 0.5% NZ Outdoors & Freedom Party 0.2% Vision NZ 0.2% New Zealand Loyal 0.2% Freedoms New Zealand 0.1% New Conservatives Party 0.1% NewZeal 0.1% Women's Rights Party 0.1%)	9
4–6 Jun 2024	Taxpayers' Union–Curia	1,000	35.4	29.4	12.7	9.7	5.6	4.0	0.8	2.4 (Note: NZ Outdoors & Freedom Party 1.3% Vision NZ 0.5% New Conservatives Party 0.1% Others 0.5%)	6
30 May 2024	Budget 2024 is delivered.										
22 Apr – 19 May 2024	Roy Morgan	925	33.5	30	14	9.5	5.5	3	3	1.5	3.5
1–10 May 2024	Talbot Mills		35	32	–	–	–	–	–	–	3
5–7 May 2024	Taxpayers' Union–Curia	1,000	37.3	30	10.2	9.4	5.5	3.1	1.4	3.1 (Note: NZ Outdoors & Freedom Party 1.1% Others 2.0%)	7.3
30 Apr 2024	Labour–Talbot Mills		34	33	12	7	6	4	–	–	1
20–24 Apr 2024	1 News–Verian	1,000	36	30	14	7	4.2	3.7	1.2	3.7 (Note: New Zealand Loyal 0.9% NewZeal 0.6% Aotearoa Legalise Cannabis Party 0.5% New Nation Party 0.4% Freedoms New Zealand 0.3% New Conservatives Party 0.3% Animal Justice Party 0.2% DemocracyNZ 0.2% Vision NZ 0.1% Others 0.2%)	6
25 Mar – 21 Apr 2024	Roy Morgan	934	36.5	24.5	13	11	5.5	5.5	2	2	12
2–4 Apr 2024	Taxpayers' Union–Curia	1,000	37.1	25.7	14.6	7.2	6.3	4.6	1.6	3 (Note: NZ Outdoors & Freedom Party 1.5% DemocracyNZ 0.3% Vision NZ 0.2% New Conservatives Party 0.2% Others 0.8%)	11.4
26 Feb – 24 Mar 2024	Roy Morgan	931	38	23	13.5	11.5	6.5	3.5	2.5	1	15
1–10 Mar 2024	Talbot Mills	1,000+	38	28	14	8	6	–	–	–	10
10 Mar 2024	Chlöe Swarbrick is elected as co-leader of the Green Party.										
3–5 Mar 2024	Taxpayers' Union–Curia	1,000	37.4	25.3	11.3	10	7.4	2.5	2.1	4 (Note: NZ Outdoors & Freedom Party 1.3% Vision NZ 0.8% DemocracyNZ 0.4% Others 1.5%)	12.1
29 Jan – 25 Feb 2024	Roy Morgan	935	35.5	21.5	15.5	12	7.5	4	2.5	1.5	14
10–14 Feb 2024	1 News–Verian	1,002	38	28	12	8	6	3.7	1.9	2.6 (Note: NZ Outdoors & Freedom Party 0.4% New Zealand Loyal 0.4% Animal Justice Party 0.3% New Conservatives Party 0.3% Women's Rights Party 0.3% NewZeal 0.3% DemocracyNZ 0.3% Aotearoa Legalise Cannabis Party 0.1% Vision NZ 0.1% Others 0.1%)	10
1–10 Feb 2024	Talbot Mills		38	29	12	7	6.2	4.9	1.4	–	9
1–7 Feb 2024	Taxpayers' Union–Curia	1,000	39.6	27.9	9	13.7	5	2.3	–	2.5	11.7
30 Jan 2024	James Shaw announces his intention to resign as co-leader of the Green Party in March 2024.										
8–28 Jan 2024	Roy Morgan	947	38	22	15.5	7.5	6	4.5	4.5	2	16
8–10 Jan 2024	Curia	1,000	41	28.4	9.5	7.8	5.6	3.6	–	–	12.6
27 Nov – 17 Dec 2023	Roy Morgan	947	36	22	15.5	9.5	6	5	4	2	14
3–5 Dec 2023	Curia		36.5	28.8	10.8	6.2	8.1	5	–	4.6	7.7
3 Dec 2023	Raf Manji resigns as leader of The Opportunities Party.										
27 Nov 2023	Christopher Luxon is sworn in as Prime Minister of New Zealand.										
30 Oct – 26 Nov 2023	Roy Morgan	920	37.5	21	12.5	12.5	8	2.5	3.5	2.5 (Note: New Conservatives Party 0.5% Others 2%)	16.5
1–6 Nov 2023	Taxpayers' Union–Curia	1,000	37	28.3	13.8	8.1	6	3.4	2.9	3.7 (Note: New Conservatives Party 0.7% Vision NZ 0.3%)	8.7
14 Oct 2023	2023 election result	N/A	38.08	26.92	11.61	8.64	6.09	3.08	2.22	3.36	11.16
Date	Polling organisation	Sample size	NAT	LAB	GRN	ACT	NZF	TPM	OPP	Others	Lead

== Electorate polling ==
=== General electorates ===
==== Auckland Central ====
Date	Polling organisation	Sample size		GRN	NAT	LAB	ACT	OPP	NZF	TPM	Lead
14–21 Oct 2026	Taxpayers' Union–Curia	400	Party Vote	30	27	27	8	7	6	2	3
14–21 Oct 2026	Taxpayers' Union–Curia	400	Electorate vote	39	35	17	5	3	—N/a	—N/a	4
22–29 Jul 2026	Taxpayers' Union–Curia	400	Party Vote	24	28	28	7	3	9	2	Tie
22–29 Jul 2026	Taxpayers' Union–Curia	400	Electorate vote	25	30	23	—N/a	—N/a	—N/a	—N/a	5

==== Hutt South ====
Date	Polling organisation	Sample size		LAB	NAT	GRN	OPP	NZF	ACT	TPM	Lead
17–19 Sep 2026	Victor Consulting	533	Party Vote	36	17	18.5	9	8	3	3	17.5
17–19 Sep 2026	Victor Consulting	533	Electorate vote	42	~30	9	—N/a	—N/a	—N/a	—N/a	~12

==== Kapiti ====
Date	Polling organisation	Sample size		NAT	LAB	GRN	OPP	NZF	ACT	TPM	Lead
Sep 2026	Curia		Electorate Vote	43	36	—N/a	—N/a	—N/a	—N/a	—N/a	7
29–31 Jul 2026	Community Engagement Limited	821	Party Vote	24.1	31.5	14	6.5	9.7	5.8	1.4	7.4
29–31 Jul 2026	Community Engagement Limited	821	Electorate Vote	33.6	37.5	5.9	4.1	—N/a	—N/a	—N/a	3.9

==== Mount Albert ====
Date	Polling organisation	Sample size		LAB	NAT	GRN	OPP	NZF	ACT	TPM	Lead
1–5 Oct 2026	Taxpayers' Union–Curia	400	Party Vote	31	28	17	6	7	7	—N/a	3
1–5 Oct 2026	Taxpayers' Union–Curia	400	Electorate Vote	31	26	18	8	—N/a	—N/a	—N/a	5
21–28 Sep 2026	Curia	400	Party Vote	32	32	19	6	6	3	2	Tie
21–28 Sep 2026	Curia	400	Electorate Vote	33	32	14	10	5	3	2	1

==== Mount Roskill ====
Date	Polling organisation	Sample size		LAB	NAT	GRN	ACT	OPP	NZF	TPM	Lead
1–12 Oct 2026	Community Engagement Limited	520	Party Vote	36.7	21.6	16.7	7.2	5.4	5.7	5.4	15.1
1–12 Oct 2026	Community Engagement Limited	520	Electorate Vote	47	29.9	4.2	3.6	2.8	—N/a	—N/a	17.1

==== Tāmaki ====
Date	Polling organisation	Sample size		NAT	LAB	GRN	ACT	NZF	TPM	OPP	Lead
21–28 Oct 2026	Taxpayers' Union–Curia	400	Party Vote	45	16	6	19	6	3	6	26
21–28 Oct 2026	Taxpayers' Union–Curia	400	Electorate vote	42	16	5	24	3	4	7	18

==== Tukituki ====
Date	Polling organisation	Sample size		NAT	LAB	NZF	ACT	GRN	OPP	TPM	Others	Lead
Oct 2026	Taxpayers' Union–Curia	400	Party Vote	35	22	12	14	8	4	3	2	13
Oct 2026	Taxpayers' Union–Curia	400	Electorate vote	39	22	17	8	8	4	2	—N/a	17

==== Waitaki ====
Date	Polling organisation	Sample size		NAT	LAB	NZF	ACT	GRN	TPM	OPP	Others	Lead
18–25 Sep 2026	Taxpayers' Union–Curia	400	Party Vote	32	19	8	19	13	4	4	1	13
18–25 Sep 2026	Taxpayers' Union–Curia	400	Electorate vote	44	21	18	5	7	2	2	—N/a	23

==== Wellington Bays ====
Date	Polling organisation	Sample size		GRN	LAB	NAT	ACT	NZF	OPP	Lead
4–10 Sep 2026	Taxpayers' Union–Curia	400	Party Vote	31	29	13	7	7	5	2
4–10 Sep 2026	Taxpayers' Union–Curia	400	Electorate Vote	29	29	15	5	5	3	Tie

==== Wellington North ====
Date	Polling organisation	Sample size		GRN	LAB	NAT	OPP	ACT	NZF	TPM	Lead
15–18 Oct 2026	Victor Consulting	541	Party Vote	25.6	31.5	12.8	13.1	5.7	4.2	0.7	5.9
15–18 Oct 2026	Victor Consulting	541	Electorate vote	35.3	32.6	16	—N/a	—N/a	—N/a	—N/a	2.7

==== West Coast-Tasman ====
Date	Polling organisation	Sample size		NAT	LAB	NZF	ACT	GRN	OPP	TPM	Others	Lead
10–17 Sep 2026	Taxpayers' Union–Curia	400	Party Vote	26	25	15	15	11	6	1	1	1
10–17 Sep 2026	Taxpayers' Union–Curia	400	Electorate vote	36	30	15	7	6	4	—N/a	2	6

=== Māori electorates ===
==== Hauraki-Waikato ====
Date	Polling organisation	Sample size		TPM	LAB	GRN	Lead
21 Sep – 1 Oct 2026	Whakaata Māori–Curia	500	Party Vote	26	24	19	2
21 Sep – 1 Oct 2026	Whakaata Māori–Curia	500	Electorate vote	54	31	—N/a	23

==== Ikaroa-Rāwhiti ====
Date	Polling organisation	Sample size		LAB	TPM	GRN	Lead
28 Sep – 8 Oct 2026	Whakaata Māori–Curia	500	Party Vote	47	11	29	18
28 Sep – 8 Oct 2026	Whakaata Māori–Curia	500	Electorate vote	40	19	15	21

==== Tāmaki Makaurau ====
Date	Polling organisation	Sample size		TPM	LAB	GRN	Lead
5–15 Oct 2026	Whakaata Māori–Curia	500	Party vote	11	31	19	12
5–15 Oct 2026	Whakaata Māori–Curia	500	Electorate vote	36	34	23	2
25 Sep – 9 Oct 2026	Mata–Horizon	711	Electorate vote	30	38	—N/a	8

==== Te Tai Hauāuru ====
Date	Polling organisation	Sample size		TPM	LAB	NAT	GRN	NZF	OPP	ACT	Lead
14–24 Sep 2026	Whakaata Māori–Curia	500	Party Vote	18	30	6	22	4	4	1	8
14–24 Sep 2026	Whakaata Māori–Curia	500	Electorate vote	46	34	13	—N/a	—N/a	—N/a	—N/a	12

==== Te Tai Tokerau ====
Date	Polling organisation	Sample size		GRN	LAB	TPM	TTT	NZF	NAT	OPP	Lead
5 Oct – 15 Oct 2026	Whakaata Māori–Curia	500	Party vote	25	27	11	3	6	4	3	2
5 Oct – 15 Oct 2026	Whakaata Māori–Curia	500	Electorate vote	24	18	17	12	—N/a	—N/a	—N/a	7
25 Sep – 9 Oct 2026	Mata–Horizon	711	Electorate vote	23	27	19	11	—N/a	—N/a	—N/a	4

==== Te Tai Tonga ====
Date	Polling organisation	Sample size		LAB	TPM	GRN	IND	NZF	NAT	OPP	ACT	Lead
14–24 Sep 2026	Whakaata Māori–Curia	500	Party Vote	31	12	16	—N/a	7	6	4	3	15
14–24 Sep 2026	Whakaata Māori–Curia	500	Electorate vote	36	21	19	18	—N/a	—N/a	—N/a	—N/a	15

==== Waiariki ====
Date	Polling organisation	Sample size		TPM	GRN	LAB	OPP	NZF	NAT	ACT	Lead
21 Sep – 1 Oct 2026	Whakaata Māori–Curia	500	Party Vote	27	25	28	—N/a	5	5	1	1
21 Sep – 1 Oct 2026	Whakaata Māori–Curia	500	Electorate vote	52	20	18	3	—N/a	—N/a	—N/a	32

== Subnational polling ==
=== Auckland Region ===
Date	Polling organisation	Sample size	NAT	LAB	GRN	ACT	NZF	TPM	OPP	Others	Lead
9–19 Oct 2026	The Post/Freshwater Strategy	426	38	26	13	9	7	1	4	1	12

== Demographic polling ==
=== Male ===
Date	Polling organisation	Sample size	NAT	LAB	GRN	ACT	NZF	TPM	OPP	Others	Lead
9–19 Oct 2026	The Post/Freshwater Strategy	587	30	24	12	11	10	3	7	3	6
4–11 Sep 2026	The Post/Freshwater Strategy	386	28	25	9	10	13	3	7	4	3

=== Female ===
Date	Polling organisation	Sample size	NAT	LAB	GRN	ACT	NZF	TPM	OPP	Others	Lead
9–19 Oct 2026	The Post/Freshwater Strategy	618	25	33	16	7	13	1	4	0	8
4–11 Sep 2026	The Post/Freshwater Strategy	419	25	31	18	7	12	2	6	0	6

=== Māori voters ===
==== Māori roll ====
Date	Polling organisation	Sample size		GRN	LAB	TPM	OPP	NAT	ACT	NZF	TTT	Lead
8–18 Sep 2026	Mata–Horizon	607	Party Vote	28	27	16	6	4	3	2	1	1

==== General roll ====
Date	Polling organisation	Sample size		LAB	GRN	NAT	NZF	OPP	ACT	TPM	Lead
8–18 Sep 2026	Mata–Horizon	438	Party Vote	38	17	11	10	6	4	2	21

==== 18–29 age group ====
Date	Polling organisation	Sample size		LAB	GRN	TPM	NAT	NZF	ACT	TTT	OPP	Lead
15–22 Oct 2026	Whakaata Māori–Curia	500	Party Vote	27	18	11	8	7	6	2	1	9

=== Pacific voters ===
Date	Polling organisation	Sample size		LAB	NAT	GRN	NZF	TPM	OPP	ACT	Lead
23 June – 13 July 2026	PMN News–Horizon	293	Party Vote	50	11	11	7	3	2	1	39

== Preferred prime minister ==
=== Graphical summary ===
Preferred Prime Minister polling ahead of New Zealand's 2026 election (03Nov2026)

=== Preferred prime minister polling table ===
Date	Polling organisation	Sample size	Luxon	Hipkins	Swarbrick	Seymour	Peters	Lead
29 Oct – 3 Nov 2026	The Post/Freshwater Strategy	1,044	38	49	–	–	–	11
28 Oct – 3 Nov 2026	Taxpayers' Union–Curia	1,000	23.8	22.6	6	5.9	10.3	1.2
29 Oct – 2 Nov 2026	1 News–Verian	1,006	23	19	8	5	6	4
20–26 Oct 2026	RNZ–Reid Research	1,000	17.1	23.3	10.5	6.6	11.4	6.2
21–25 Oct 2026	1 News–Verian	1,000	24	18	7	6	7	6
15–19 Oct 2026	1 News–Verian	1,003	20	17	7	5	8	3
9–19 Oct 2026	The Post/Freshwater Strategy	1,458	36	49	–	–	–	13
8–12 Oct 2026	1 News–Verian	1,007	20	20	6	4	7	Tie
6–10 Oct 2026	Anacta	1,352	22	22	–	–	–	Tie
1–5 Oct 2026	Taxpayers' Union–Curia	1,000	21.2	21	4.9	6	13.9	0.2
1–5 Oct 2026	1 News–Verian	1,001	20	18	7	5	9	1
24 Sep – 1 Oct 2026	RNZ–Reid Research	1,000	17.1	21.9	8.7	7.6	11.2	4.8
23–27 Sep 2026	1 News–Verian	1,004	19	14	8	7	7	5
4–11 Sep 2026	The Post/Freshwater Strategy	1,011	35	45	–	–	–	10
1–3 Sep 2026	Taxpayers' Union–Curia	1,000	21.2	16.9	7	7.8	10.7	4.3
14–21 Aug 2026	RNZ–Reid Research	1,000	19.9	21.3	7.4	6.2	11.1	1.4
8–11 Aug 2026	1 News–Verian	847	17	15	6	5	7	2
1–11 Aug 2026	Talbot Mills		22	23	8	7	12	1
1–4 Aug 2026	Taxpayers' Union–Curia	1,000	23.2	19.8	4.8	3.8	10.5	3.4
2–9 Jul 2026	RNZ–Reid Research	1,000	20	23.9	8.2	6.9	13.2	3.9
1–5 Jul 2026	Taxpayers' Union–Curia	1,000	19.1	19.2	4.6	5.1	11.8	0.1
13–17 Jun 2026	1 News–Verian	1,001	18	16	6	4	10	2
5–11 Jun 2026	The Post/Freshwater Strategy	1,038	37	44	–	–	–	7
1–10 Jun 2026	Talbot Mills	1,021	20	21	10	6	14	1
4–8 Jun 2026	Taxpayers' Union–Curia	1,000	18.8	17.1	8.1	6.3	12.8	1.7
1–10 May 2026	Talbot Mills		20	23	10	7	17	3
3–7 May 2026	Taxpayers' Union–Curia	1,000	21.5	19	5.4	3.9	11.6	2.5
16 Apr 2026	Talbot Mills	1,082	20	23	9	7	15	3
11–15 Apr 2026	1 News–Verian	1,010	16	19	6	4	12	3
1–2 Apr 2026	Taxpayers' Union–Curia	1,000	20.5	21.7	7.4	4.6	12.1	1.2
12–20 Mar 2026	RNZ–Reid Research	1,000	17.3	20.7	6.8	6.8	13.1	3.4
2–12 Mar 2026	Talbot Mills	1,059	22	26	8	6	13	4
1–3 Mar 2026	Taxpayers' Union–Curia	1,000	21	22.7	4.6	5.2	10.4	1.7
6–12 Feb 2026	The Post/Freshwater Strategy	1,039	34	46	–	–	–	12
7–11 Feb 2026	1 News–Verian	1,003	20	20	5	4	10	Tie
1–3 Feb 2026	Taxpayers' Union–Curia	1,000	22	18	6.7	4.8	12.5	4
15–22 Jan 2026	RNZ–Reid Research	1,000	19.4	21.1	6	6.7	12.6	0.7
14–18 Jan 2026	Taxpayers' Union–Curia	1,000	19.5	18	5.5	7.1	9.7	1.5
5–10 Dec 2025	The Post/Freshwater Strategy	1,031	39	45	–	–	–	6
3–7 Dec 2025	Taxpayers' Union–Curia	1,000	19.7	17.8	7.6	6	8.5	1.9
29 Nov – 3 Dec 2025	1 News–Verian	1,007	23	21	5	5	9	2
1–10 Nov 2025	Talbot Mills		22	26	–	–	–	4
2–6 Nov 2025	Taxpayers' Union–Curia	1,000	20.8	20.6	4.1	7.7	8.5	0.2
1–10 Oct 2025	Talbot Mills	1,097	21	24	–	–	–	3
4–8 Oct 2025	1 News–Verian	1,014	21	18	6	5	8	3
3–8 Oct 2025	The Post/Freshwater Strategy	1,050	36	45	–	–	–	9
1–5 Oct 2025	Taxpayers' Union–Curia	1,000	19.8	20.9	6.3	4	9.9	1.1
4–12 Sep 2025	RNZ-Reid Research	1,000	19.6	23	6.5	5.8	8.9	3.4
1–10 Sep 2025	Talbot Mills	1,000	20	25	–	–	–	5
31 Aug – 2 Sep 2025	Taxpayers' Union–Curia	1,000	21.7	17.7	8.8	3.7	10.9	4
1–10 Aug 2025	Talbot Mills	1,000	21	26	–	–	–	5
2–6 Aug 2025	1 News–Verian	1,002	20	19	4	4	7	1
3–5 Aug 2025	Taxpayers' Union–Curia	1,000	20.2	20.2	8	6.2	8.2	Tie
1–10 Jul 2025	Talbot Mills	1,090	24	24	–	–	–	Tie
2–6 Jul 2025	Taxpayers' Union–Curia	1,000	19.7	19.6	7	5.7	9.3	0.1
12–15 Jun 2025	The Post/Freshwater Strategy	1,150	37	43	–	–	–	6
7–9 Jun 2025	Taxpayers' Union–Curia	1,000	20.3	18.5	5.6	6	8	1.8
31 May 2025	David Seymour of the ACT party becomes Deputy Prime Minister, replacing Winston Peters of NZ First.							
23–30 May 2025	RNZ-Reid Research	1,008	18.8	23.2	6.9	6.4	8.9	4.4
24–28 May 2025	1 News-Verian	1,002	23	19	5	4	6	4
30 Apr – 4 May 2025	Taxpayers' Union–Curia	1,000	24.5	20	5	6.7	8.1	4.5
29 Mar – 2 Apr 2025	1 News–Verian	1,000	23	20	4	3	7	3
29 Mar – 1 Apr 2025	Taxpayers' Union–Curia	1,000	21.9	18.9	4.2	8	12.8	3
21–27 Mar 2025	RNZ–Reid Research	1,000	21.9	20.9	6.1	6.8	7.9	1
1–10 Mar 2025	Talbot Mills	1,003	21	24	–	–	–	3
2–4 Mar 2025	Taxpayers' Union–Curia	1,000	20.3	20.7	4.8	5	8.6	0.4
3–7 Feb 2025	1 News–Verian	1,002	22	17	6	6	5	5
2–4 Feb 2025	Taxpayers' Union–Curia	1,000	20.7	17.6	8.9	6.4	8	3.1
7–27 Jan 2025	Talbot Mills	1,049	24	25	–	–	–	1
9–13 Jan 2025	Taxpayers' Union–Curia	1,000	24.5	15.3	8.5	6.3	8.8	9.2
30 Nov – 4 Dec 2024	1 News–Verian	1,006	24	15	6	6	5	9
1–3 Dec 2024	Taxpayers' Union–Curia	1,000	27.1	19.9	4.5	5.8	5.8	7.2
22–28 Nov 2024	Labour–Talbot Mills		22.1	22.7	–	–	–	0.6
26–27 Nov 2024	The Post/Freshwater Strategy	1,150	41	42	–	–	–	1
6–10 Nov 2024	Taxpayers' Union–Curia	1,000	26.5	15.5	5.2	7.4	6.3	11
1–10 Nov 2024	Talbot Mills		25	23	–	–	–	2
5–9 Oct 2024	1 News–Verian	1,000	25	15	6	4	6	10
3–7 Oct 2024	Taxpayers' Union–Curia	1,000	27.7	16.9	9.9	7.4	8.4	10.8
8–10 Sep 2024	Taxpayers' Union–Curia	1,000	32.7	12.6	7.2	5.2	6.7	20.1
1–10 Sep 2024	Talbot Mills		26	22	–	–	–	4
10–14 Aug 2024	1 News–Verian	1,001	28	18	7	4	5	10
4–8 Jul 2024	Taxpayers' Union–Curia	1,000	34.5	18.7	10.9	5.6	5.6	15.8
15–19 Jun 2024	1 News–Verian	1,002	23	18	6	4	4	5
4–6 Jun 2024	Taxpayers' Union–Curia	1,000	25.4	20.2	8.6	5	3.8	5.2
1–10 May 2024	Talbot Mills		25	25	–	–	–	Tie
20–24 Apr 2024	1 News–Verian	1,000	23	16	6	5	4	7
10 Mar 2024	Chlöe Swarbrick is elected as co-leader of the Green Party.							
1–10 Mar 2024	Talbot Mills	1,000+	24	23	–	–	–	1
10–14 Feb 2024	1 News–Verian	1,002	25	15	4	4	6	10
1–10 Feb 2024	Talbot Mills		27	23	–	–	–	4
1–7 Feb 2024	Taxpayers' Union–Curia	1,000	29	19	6	10	6	10
8–10 Jan 2024	Curia	1,000	31	13	–	–	–	18
3–5 Dec 2023	Curia		30	22	–	–	–	8
1–6 Nov 2023	Taxpayers' Union–Curia	1,000	33	18	6.3	4	5	15

== Leadership approval rating ==
Date	Polling organisation	Sample size												
Date	Polling organisation	Sample size	Luxon			Hipkins			Seymour			Peters		
Date	Polling organisation	Sample size	Pos.	Neg.	Net	Pos.	Neg.	Net	Pos.	Neg.	Net	Pos.	Neg.	Net
20–26 Oct 2026	RNZ–Reid Research	1,000	30.1%	53.8%	–23.7	39.7%	34.7%	+5	–			–		
24 Sep – 1 Oct 2026	RNZ–Reid Research	1,000	29.6%	53.3%	–23.7	35.1%	38.7%	–3.6	–			–		
14–21 Aug 2026	RNZ–Reid Research	1,000	30.3%	53.2%	–22.9	34.4%	38.2%	–3.8	–			–		
1–4 Aug 2026	Taxpayers' Union–Curia	1,000			–19			–7			–24			–16
4–8 Jun 2026	Taxpayers' Union–Curia	1,000			–19			–7			–18			–5
12–20 Mar 2026	RNZ–Reid Research	1,000	29.8%	50.4%	–20.6	35.9%	35.6%	+0.3	–			–		
1–3 Mar 2026	Taxpayers' Union–Curia	1,000	27%	46%	–19	36%	41%	–5	–			35%	43%	–8
1–3 Feb 2026	Taxpayers' Union–Curia	1,000	29%	45%	–16	31%	39%	–8	25%	53%	–28	34%	40%	–7
15–22 Jan 2026	RNZ–Reid Research	1,000			–14			+0.9	–			–		
14–18 Jan 2026	Taxpayers' Union–Curia	1,000	28%	44%	–17	33%	37%	–4	23%	47%	–24	35%	41%	–6
5–10 Dec 2025	The Post/Freshwater Strategy	1,031	34%	45%	–11	39%	33%	+7	28%	44%	–15	36%	36%	=
3–7 Dec 2025	Taxpayers' Union–Curia	1,000			–13			–7			–24			–2
2–6 Nov 2025	Taxpayers' Union–Curia	1,000			–10			–2			–11			+2
4–8 Oct 2025	1 News–Verian	1,014	38%	52%	–14	42%	41%	+1	–			–		
3–8 Oct 2025	The Post/Freshwater Strategy	1,050	27%	51%	–24			=			–27			–6
4–12 Sep 2025	RNZ–Reid Research	1,000			–15.2			+3	–			–		
12–15 Jun 2025	The Post/Freshwater Strategy	1,150	31%	49%	–18	36%	32%	+4			–12			–11
7–9 Jun 2025	Taxpayers' Union–Curia	1,000			–8.6			+3.2			–17.6			+1
23–30 May 2025	RNZ–Reid Research	1,008	35.7%	45.5%	–9.8	39.1	34%	+5.1	–			–		
29 Mar – 2 Apr 2025	1 News–Verian	1,000	40%	47%	–7	49%	33%	+16	–			–		
29 Mar – 1 Apr 2025	Taxpayers' Union–Curia	1,000			–6			+2			–18			–4
2–4 Mar 2025	Taxpayers' Union–Curia	1,000			–10			+4			–28			–1
21–27 Mar 2025	RNZ–Reid Research	1,000			–3.9			+12.3	–			–		
26–27 Nov 2024	The Post/Freshwater Strategy	1,150	29%	46%	–16	34%	34%	=	23%	47%	–24	25%	46%	–22
8–10 Sep 2024	Taxpayers' Union–Curia	1,000	41%	34%	+7	31%	41%	–10			–14			–9
15–19 Jun 2024	1 News–Verian	1,002	40%	45%	–5	47%	34%	+13	–			–		
4–6 Jun 2024	Taxpayers' Union–Curia	1,000			–5			+3			–18			–19
5–7 May 2024	Taxpayers' Union–Curia	1,000			+8			–1			–7			–5
2–4 Apr 2024	Taxpayers' Union–Curia	1,000			–7			–6			–11			–18
3–5 Mar 2024	Taxpayers' Union–Curia	1,000	39%	44%	–5	40%	38%	+2			–8			–12
1–7 Feb 2024	Taxpayers' Union–Curia	1,000	44%	33%	+11	40%	35%	+4			–8			–22
8–10 Jan 2024	Curia	1,000	42%	37%	+5	37%	34%	+3			–14			–24
3–5 Dec 2023	Curia		39%	40%	–1	42%	33%	+9			–19			–36

== Government approval rating ==
Date	Polling organisation	Sample size	Right direction	Wrong direction	Do not know	Lead
28 Oct – 3 Nov 2026	Taxpayers' Union–Curia	1,000	41.8	45	–	3.2
20–26 Oct 2026	RNZ–Reid Research	1,000	30.5	50.5	19	20
28 Sep – 25 Oct 2026	Roy Morgan	859	37.5	55	7.5	17.5
9–19 Oct 2026	The Post/Freshwater Strategy	1,458	29	54	16	25
6–10 Oct 2026	Anacta	1,352	40	49	–	9
24 Sep – 1 Oct 2026	RNZ–Reid Research	1,000	31.6	53.1	15.3	21.5
31 Aug – 27 Sep 2026	Roy Morgan	859	31	57.5	11.5	26.5
4–11 Sep 2026	The Post/Freshwater Strategy	1,011	27	56	16	29
27 Jul – 23 Aug 2026	Roy Morgan	858	35	53.5	11.5	18.5
14–21 Aug 2026	RNZ–Reid Research	1,000	30.8	51.8	17.4	21
29 Jun – 26 Jul 2026	Roy Morgan	881	35.5	50.5	14	15
2–9 Jul 2026	RNZ–Reid Research	1,000	34.7	46.5	18.7	11.8
25 May – 21 Jun 2026	Roy Morgan	891	37	49	14	12
1–10 Jun 2026	Talbot Mills	1,021	41	49	10	8
27 Apr – 24 May 2026	Roy Morgan	870	36.5	52	11.5	15.5
30 Mar – 26 Apr 2026	Roy Morgan	887	31.5	56	12.5	24.5
23 Feb – 22 Mar 2026	Roy Morgan	872	34	56	10	22
12–20 Mar 2026	RNZ–Reid Research	1,000	32.3	50	17.7	17.7
2–12 Mar 2026	Talbot Mills	1,059	46	44	10	2
27 Jan – 22 Feb 2026	Roy Morgan	870	36.5	52	11.5	15.5
6–26 Jan 2026	Roy Morgan	881	36.5	51.6	12	15.1
15–22 Jan 2026	RNZ–Reid Research	1,000	36.3	46.6	17	10.3
14–18 Jan 2026	Taxpayers' Union–Curia	1,000	32.6	49	18.4	16.4
24 Nov – 21 Dec 2025	Roy Morgan	859	37	52	11	15
5–10 Dec 2025	The Post/Freshwater Strategy	1,031	33	52	15	19
25 Aug – 21 Sep 2025	Roy Morgan	870	39	49.5	11.5	10.5
4–12 Sep 2025	RNZ–Reid Research	1,000	34	48.9	17.1	14.9
28 Jul – 24 Aug 2025	Roy Morgan	873	37	53.5	9.5	16.5
30 Jun – 27 Jul 2025	Roy Morgan	832	37	53.5	9.5	16.5
26 May – 22 Jun 2025	Roy Morgan	812	41	46	13	5
12–15 Jun 2025	The Post/Freshwater Strategy	1,150	35	49	16	14
23–30 May 2025	RNZ–Reid Research	1,008	37.8	46.6	15.6	8.8
28 Apr – 25 May 2025	Roy Morgan	799	35	54.5	10.5	19.5
30 Apr – 4 May 2025	Taxpayers' Union–Curia	1,000	33.3	46	20.7	12.7
24 Mar – 20 Apr 2025	Roy Morgan	829	40.5	43	13.5	2.5
21–27 Mar 2025	RNZ–Reid Research	1,000	43.5	40.6	15.8	2.9
24 Feb – 23 Mar 2025	Roy Morgan	888	32.5	52.5	15	20
27 Jan – 23 Feb 2025	Roy Morgan	888	39	49	12	10
3–7 Feb 2025	1 News–Verian	1,002	39	50	11	11
2–4 Feb 2025	Taxpayers' Union–Curia	1,000	34.2	50	15.8	15.8
2–26 Jan 2025	Roy Morgan	885	37.5	48.5	14	11
9–13 Jan 2025	Taxpayers' Union–Curia	1,000	39	53	12	14
25 Nov – 15 Dec 2024	Roy Morgan	885	35	52.5	12.5	17.5
26–27 Nov 2024	The Post/Freshwater Strategy	1,150	35	48	17	13
28 Oct – 24 Nov 2024	Roy Morgan	866	46.5	42.5	11	4
1–10 Nov 2024	Talbot Mills		40	46	14	6
23 Sep – 20 Oct 2024	Roy Morgan	883	36.5	50.5	13	14
26 Aug – 22 Sep 2024	Roy Morgan	902	39	46.5	14.5	7.5
1–10 Sep 2024	Talbot Mills		42	47	11	5
29 Jul – 25 Aug 2024	Roy Morgan	898	43	45.5	11.5	2.5
24 Jun – 21 Jul 2024	Roy Morgan	930	38	48	14	10
4–8 Jul 2024	Taxpayers' Union–Curia	1,000	47.3	33.9	18.8	13.4
27 May – 23 Jun 2024	Roy Morgan	930	35.5	52.5	12	17
22 Apr – 19 May 2024	Roy Morgan	925	43	47	10	4
1–10 May 2024	Talbot Mills		38	52	10	14
5–7 May 2024	Taxpayers' Union–Curia	1,000	45.1	42.6	12.3	2.5
25 Mar–21 Apr 2024	Roy Morgan	934	34.5	49	16.5	14.5
26 Feb–24 Mar 2024	Roy Morgan	931	35	54	11	19
1–10 Mar 2024	Talbot Mills	1,000+	40	48	12	8
3–5 Mar 2024	Taxpayers' Union–Curia	1,000	39.5	43.4	17	3.9
29 Jan – 25 Feb 2024	Roy Morgan	935	41.5	43.5	15	2
1–10 Feb 2024	Talbot Mills		43	41	16	2
1–7 Feb 2024	Taxpayers' Union–Curia	1,000	39.7	35.2	25.1	4.5
8–28 Jan 2024	Roy Morgan	947	42	41	17	1
27 Nov – 17 Dec 2023	Roy Morgan	947	38	45	17	7
30 Oct – 26 Nov 2023	Roy Morgan	920	36.5	46	17.5	9.5
9–12 Nov 2023	Guardian Essential	1,193	29	48	23	19
1–6 Nov 2023	Taxpayers' Union–Curia	1,000	29	49	22	20

== Forecasts ==
The use of mixed-member proportional representation allows ready conversion of a party's support into a party vote percentage and therefore a number of seats in Parliament. Projections generally assume no material change to the electorate seats held by each party (ACT retains Epsom and Tāmaki, Greens retain Auckland Central, Wellington Bays and Wellington North, Te Pāti Māori retains their Māori electorates, etc).

However, these projections generally assume that the National Party will not receive an overhang. Projections showing National winning fewer than 44 seats (the number of electorate seats it currently holds) therefore assume that it will lose a sufficient number of electorates to avoid an overhang. Most projections also assume that Te Pāti Māori will retain Hauraki-Waikato, Tāmaki Makaurau, Te Tai Hauāuru and Waiariki, but not Te Tai Tokerau or Te Tai Tonga, which are held by MPs who are no longer members of the party. Some projections include Te Tai Tokerau Party, established by a former Te Pāti Māori MP who currently holds the Te Tai Tokerau electorate, while others do not. Parties that do not hold an electorate seat and poll below 5% are assumed to win no seats.

When determining the scenarios for the overall result, the minimum parties necessary to form majority governments are listed (provided parties have indicated openness to working together). Actual governments formed may include other parties beyond the minimum required for a majority; this happened after the 2014 New Zealand general election, when National only needed one seat from another party to reach a 61-seat majority, but instead chose to form a 64-seat government with Māori, ACT and United Future.

Pollster Date	Seats in parliament (Note: Forecasted seats are calculated using the Electoral Commission's MMP seat allocation calculator, based on polling results.)									Likeliest government formation
Pollster Date	NAT	LAB	GRN	ACT	NZF	TPM	OPP	TTT	Total	Likeliest government formation
2026 preliminary election result 7 Nov 2026	42*******	36	16	13	12	5****	7	0	131	National–ACT–NZ First (67)
The Post/Freshwater Strategy 29 Oct – 3 Nov 2026	32	37	16	12	15	4**	6	0	122	Hung parliament (Opportunity holds the balance of power)
Taxpayers' Union–Curia 28 Oct – 3 Nov 2026	35	34	18	13	12	1	7	0	120	Hung parliament
1News–Verian 29 Oct – 2 Nov 2026	36	35	20	12	10	4****	7	1*	125	Hung parliament (Opportunity holds the balance of power)
RNZ-Reid Research 20–26 Oct 2026	30	37	18	12	12	2	9	0	120	Hung parliament (Opportunity holds the balance of power)
1News–Verian 21–25 Oct 2026	34	33	18	15	12	4****	8	1*	125	Hung parliament (Opportunity holds the balance of power)
Roy Morgan 28 Sep – 25 Oct 2026	32	33	19	13	12	4***	10	0	123	Hung parliament (Opportunity holds the balance of power)
1News–Verian 15–19 Oct 2026	38	32	19	13	9	4***	8	1*	124	Hung parliament (Opportunity holds the balance of power)
The Post/Freshwater Strategy 9–19 Oct 2026	34	35	17	11	14	4**	7	0	122	Hung parliament (Opportunity holds the balance of power)
1News–Verian 8–12 Oct 2026	34	34	18	12	12	4****	10	1*	125	Hung parliament (Opportunity holds the balance of power)
Anacta 6–10 Oct 2026	34	36	18	11	12	4**	7	0	122	Hung parliament (Opportunity holds the balance of power)
Taxpayers' Union–Curia 1–5 Oct 2026	37	36	17	12	16	2	0	0	120	National–NZ First–ACT (65)
1News–Verian 1–5 Oct 2026	35	34	19	11	12	4***	8	1*	124	Hung parliament (Opportunity holds the balance of power)
RNZ–Reid Research 24 Sep – 1 Oct 2026	32	37	18	11	13	2	7	0	120	Hung parliament (Opportunity holds the balance of power)
1News–Verian 23–27 Sep 2026	34	34	19	14	11	4***	7	1*	124	Hung parliament (Opportunity holds the balance of power)
Roy Morgan 31 Aug – 27 Sep 2026	38	28	19	13	12	4**	8	0	122	National–ACT–NZ First (63)
The Post/Freshwater Strategy 4–11 Sep 2026	33	34	17	11	16	4**	7	0	122	Hung parliament (Opportunity holds the balance of power)
Anacta 4–10 Sep 2026	36	37	15	10	12	4**	8	0	122	Hung parliament (Opportunity holds the balance of power)
Taxpayers' Union–Curia 1–3 Sep 2026	39	35	18	14	11	3	0	0	120	National–ACT–NZ First (64)
Roy Morgan 27 Jul – 23 Aug 2026	37	29	19	13	9	4**	11	0	122	Hung parliament (Opportunity holds the balance of power)
RNZ–Reid Research 14–21 Aug 2026	35	39	12	9	15	4	6	0	120	Hung parliament (Opportunity holds the balance of power)
1News–Verian 8–11 Aug 2026	36	37	15	11	10	4***	10	0	123	Hung parliament (Opportunity holds the balance of power)
Talbot Mills 1–11 Aug 2026	35	41	10	8	16	4	6	0	120	Hung parliament (Opportunity holds the balance of power)
Taxpayers' Union–Curia 1–4 Aug 2026	40	36	13	9	12	2	8	0	120	Hung parliament (Opportunity holds the balance of power)
Roy Morgan 29 Jun – 26 Jul 2026	40	31	17	10	10	4**	10	0	122	Hung parliament (Opportunity holds the balance of power)
Talbot Mills 10–19 Jul 2026	39	42	11	9	15	4	0	0	120	National–ACT–NZ First (63)
RNZ–Reid Research 2–9 Jul 2026	36	43	13	10	15	4*	0	0	121	National–ACT–NZ First (61)
Taxpayers' Union–Curia 1–5 Jul 2026	39	41	13	9	14	4	0	0	120	National–ACT–NZ First (62)
Roy Morgan 25 May – 21 Jun 2026	37	31	16	11	13	4	8	0	120	National–ACT–NZ First (61)
1 News–Verian 13–17 Jun 2026	38	41	17	8	14	4**	0	0	122	Labour–Greens–Māori (62)
The Post/Freshwater Strategy 5–11 Jun 2026	36	44	12	10	15	4*	0	0	121	National–ACT–NZ First (61)
Talbot Mills 1–10 Jun 2026	36	42	16	8	15	4*	0	0	121	Labour–Greens–Māori (62)
Taxpayers' Union–Curia 4–8 Jun 2026	38	40	14	10	14	4	0	0	120	National–ACT–NZ First (62)
Roy Morgan 27 Apr – 24 May 2026	37	33	15	12	13	5**	7	0	122	National–ACT–NZ First (62)
Talbot Mills 1–10 May 2026	36	45	11	9	17	5***	0	0	123	National–ACT–NZ First (62)
Taxpayers' Union–Curia 3–7 May 2026	39	41	12	8	15	5	0	0	120	National–ACT–NZ First (62)
Roy Morgan 30 Mar – 26 Apr 2026	32	43	14	13	14	5*	0	0	121	Labour–Greens–Māori (62)
Talbot Mills 16 Apr 2026	36	44	9	10	19	5***	0	0	123	National–ACT–NZ First (65)
1 News–Verian 11–15 Apr 2026	37	46	14	9	12	5***	0	0	123	Labour–Greens–Māori (65)
Taxpayers' Union–Curia 1–2 Apr 2026	37	42	10	11	17	5**	0	0	122	National–ACT–NZ First (65)
Roy Morgan 23 Feb – 22 Mar 2026	33	43	14	12	14	5*	0	0	121	Labour–Greens–Māori (62)
RNZ–Reid Research 12–20 Mar 2026	38	44	12	9	13	5*	0	0	121	Labour–Greens–Māori (61)
Talbot Mills 2–12 Mar 2026	39	43	14	9	13	5***	0	0	123	Labour–Greens–Māori (62)
Taxpayers' Union–Curia 1–3 Mar 2026	36	44	13	10	13	4	0	0	120	Labour–Greens–Māori (61)
Roy Morgan 27 Jan – 22 Feb 2026	39	38	18	10	12	4*	0	0	121	National–ACT–NZ First (61)
The Post/Freshwater Strategy 6–12 Feb 2026	38	46	13	7	14	4**	0	0	122	Labour–Greens–Māori (63)
1 News–Verian 7–11 Feb 2026	42	39	14	11	12	4**	0	0	122	National–ACT–NZ First (65)
Taxpayers' Union–Curia 1–3 Feb 2026	39	43	13	8	13	4	0	0	120	Hung parliament
Roy Morgan 6–26 Jan 2026	43	38	13	11	11	4	0	0	120	National–ACT–NZ First (64)
RNZ–Reid Research 15–22 Jan 2026	40	43	12	9	12	4	0	0	120	National–ACT–NZ First (61)
Taxpayers' Union–Curia 14–18 Jan 2026	39	43	10	9	15	4	0	0	120	National–ACT–NZ First (63)
Roy Morgan 25 Nov – 21 Dec 2025	41	40	15	9	12	4*	0	0	121	National–ACT–NZ First (62)
The Post/Freshwater Strategy 5–10 Dec 2025	38	48	10	10	11	4*	0	0	121	Labour–Greens–Māori (62)
1 News–Verian 29 Nov–3 Dec 2025	44	43	9	12	11	4***	0	0	123	National–ACT–NZ First (67)
Roy Morgan 27 Oct – 23 Nov 2025	42	36	18	10	11	4*	0	0	121	National–ACT–NZ First (63)
Talbot Mills 1–10 Nov 2025	40	47	11	9	10	4*	0	0	121	Labour–Greens–Māori (62)
Taxpayers' Union–Curia 2–6 Nov 2025	39	42	12	11	12	6**	0	0	122	National–ACT–NZ First (62)
Roy Morgan 29 Sep – 26 Oct 2025	41	39	15	10	12	6***	0	0	123	National–ACT–NZ First (63)
Talbot Mills 1–10 Oct 2025	35	43	12	10	15	6*	0	0	121	Labour–Greens–Māori (61)
1 News–Verian 4–8 Oct 2025	42	40	14	9	12	6***	0	0	123	National–ACT–NZ First (63)
The Post/Freshwater Strategy 3–8 Oct 2025	38	42	11	11	14	6**	0	0	122	National–ACT–NZ First (63)
Taxpayers' Union–Curia 1–5 Oct 2025	38	40	15	8	13	6	0	0	120	Labour–Greens–Māori (61)
Roy Morgan 25 Aug – 21 Sep 2025	39	36	17	11	10	7	0	0	120	Hung parliament
RNZ–Reid Research 4–12 Sep 2025	40	42	13	9	11	6*	0	0	121	Labour–Greens–Māori (61)
Talbot Mills 1–10 Sep 2025	39	43	12	9	12	6*	0	0	121	Labour–Greens–Māori (61)
Taxpayers' Union–Curia 31 Aug – 2 Sep 2025	42	42	13	8	10	6	0	0	120	Labour–Greens–Māori (61)
Roy Morgan 28 Jul – 24 Aug 2025	36	42	17	13	9	6***	0	0	123	Labour–Greens–Māori (65)
Talbot Mills 1–10 Aug 2025	39	42	13	10	11	6*	0	0	121	Labour–Greens–Māori (61)
1 News–Verian 2–6 Aug 2025	42	40	12	10	11	6*	0	0	121	National–ACT–NZ First (63)
Taxpayers' Union–Curia 3–5 Aug 2025	40	43	12	11	10	6**	0	0	122	Hung parliament
Roy Morgan 30 Jun – 27 Jul 2025	38	39	14	13	12	6**	0	0	122	National–ACT–NZ First (63)
Talbot Mills 1–10 Jul 2025	39	42	15	10	9	6*	0	0	121	Labour–Greens–Māori (63)
Taxpayers' Union–Curia 2–6 Jul 2025	42	39	12	11	12	6**	0	0	122	National–ACT–NZ First (65)
Roy Morgan 26 May – 22 Jun 2025	40	37	14	15	8	6	0	0	120	National–ACT–NZ First (63)
Taxpayers' Union–Curia 7–9 Jun 2025	42	44	10	12	8	6**	0	0	122	National–ACT–NZ First (62)
RNZ–Reid Research 23–30 May 2025	38	42	14	8	11	7	0	0	120	Labour–Greens–Māori (63)
1 News–Verian 24–28 May 2025	43	37	15	10	10	6*	0	0	121	National–ACT–NZ First (63)
Roy Morgan 28 Apr – 25 May 2025	40	37	14	15	8	6	0	0	120	National–ACT–NZ First (63)
Taxpayers' Union–Curia 30 Apr – 4 May 2025	42	41	11	12	9	6*	0	0	121	National–ACT–NZ First (63)
Roy Morgan 24 Mar – 20 Apr 2025	39	36	17	11	11	6	0	0	120	National–ACT–NZ First (61)
1 News–Verian 29 Mar – 2 Apr 2025	44	40	12	11	9	6**	0	0	122	National–ACT–NZ First (64)
Taxpayers' Union–Curia 29 Mar – 1 Apr 2025	42	37	14	13	9	6*	0	0	121	National–ACT–NZ First (64)
RNZ–Reid Research 21–27 Mar 2025	41	40	12	12	9	6	0	0	120	National–ACT–NZ First (62)
Roy Morgan 24 Feb – 23 Mar 2025	41	35	18	10	9	7	0	0	120	Hung parliament
Talbot Mills 1–10 Mar 2025	39	43	13	12	8	6*	0	0	121	Labour–Greens–Māori (62)
Taxpayers' Union–Curia 2–4 Mar 2025	42	42	12	10	6	8	0	0	120	Labour–Greens–Māori (62)
Roy Morgan 27 Jan – 23 Feb 2025	38	36	20	14	8	6**	0	0	122	Labour–Greens–Māori (62)
1 News–Verian 3–7 Feb 2025	43	42	13	11	6	6*	0	0	121	Labour–Greens–Māori (61)
Taxpayers' Union–Curia 2–4 Feb 2025	39	39	16	12	8	6	0	0	120	Labour–Greens–Māori (61)
Talbot Mills 7–27 Jan 2025	40	42	15	11	6	6	0	0	120	Labour–Greens–Māori (63)
Roy Morgan 2–26 Jan 2025	40	36	14	11	11	8	0	0	120	National–ACT–NZ First (62)
Taxpayers' Union–Curia 9–13 Jan 2025	38	39	12	14	10	7	0	0	120	National–ACT–NZ First (62)
Roy Morgan 25 Nov – 15 Dec 2024	39	32	17	16	9	7	0	0	120	National–ACT–NZ First (64)
1 News–Verian 30 Nov – 4 Dec 2024	46	36	12	10	7	9	0	0	120	National–ACT–NZ First (63)
Taxpayers' Union–Curia 1–3 Dec 2024	44	34	11	17	7	7	0	0	120	National–ACT (61)
Labour–Talbot Mills 22–28 Nov 2024	39	40	12	12	8	9	0	0	120	Labour–Greens–Māori (61)
The Post/Freshwater Strategy 26–27 Nov 2024	42	39	16	10	8	6*	0	0	121	Labour–Greens–Māori (61)
Roy Morgan 28 Oct – 24 Nov 2024	37	36	17	11	8	11	0	0	120	Labour–Greens–Māori (64)
Taxpayers' Union–Curia 6–10 Nov 2024	48	39	11	11	8	6***	0	0	123	National–ACT–NZ First (67)
Talbot Mills 1–10 Nov 2024	42	41	12	12	9	6**	0	0	122	National–ACT–NZ First (63)
Roy Morgan 23 Sep – 20 Oct 2024	39	37	18	11	9	6	0	0	120	Labour–Greens–Māori (61)
1 News–Verian 5–9 Oct 2024	47	37	15	10	6	6*	0	0	121	National–ACT–NZ First (63)
Taxpayers' Union–Curia 3–7 Oct 2024	44	38	13	12	9	6**	0	0	122	National–ACT–NZ First (65)
Roy Morgan 26 Aug – 22 Sep 2024	47	29	17	13	9	6*	0	0	121	National–ACT–NZ First (69)
Taxpayers' Union–Curia 8–10 Sep 2024	48	33	14	11	8	6	0	0	120	National–ACT–NZ First (67)
Talbot Mills 1–10 Sep 2024	46	39	12	10	8	6*	0	0	121	National–ACT–NZ First (64)
Roy Morgan 29 Jul – 25 Aug 2024	45	33	16	12	9	6*	0	0	121	National–ACT–NZ First (66)
1 News–Verian 10–14 Aug 2024	49	38	14	8	7	6**	0	0	122	National–ACT–NZ First (64)
Roy Morgan 24 Jun – 21 Jul 2024	41	31	18	14	8	8	0	0	120	National–ACT–NZ First (63)
Taxpayers' Union–Curia 4–8 Jul 2024	47	33	16	11	9	6**	0	0	122	National–ACT–NZ First (67)
Roy Morgan 27 May – 23 Jun 2024	44	35	18	11	7	6*	0	0	121	National–ACT–NZ First (62)
1 News–Verian 15–19 Jun 2024	47	36	16	9	8	6**	0	0	122	National–ACT–NZ First (64)
Taxpayers' Union–Curia 4–6 Jun 2024	44	36	16	12	7	6*	0	0	121	National–ACT–NZ First (63)
Roy Morgan 22 Apr – 19 May 2024	42	38	17	12	7	6**	0	0	122	Hung parliament
Taxpayers' Union–Curia 5–7 May 2024	47	37	13	12	7	6**	0	0	122	National–ACT–NZ First (66)
Talbot Mills 30 Apr 2024	42	41	15	9	8	6*	0	0	121	Labour–Greens–Māori (62)
1 News–Verian 20–24 Apr 2024	48	40	18	9	0	6*	0	0	121	Labour–Greens–Māori (64)
Roy Morgan 25 Mar – 21 Apr 2024	45	31	16	14	7	7	0	0	120	National–ACT–NZ First (66)
Taxpayers' Union–Curia 2–4 Apr 2024	47	32	18	9	8	6	0	0	120	National–ACT–NZ First (64)
Roy Morgan 29 Jan – 25 Feb 2024	45	27	19	15	9	5	0	0	120	National–ACT–NZ First (69)
Talbot Mills 1–10 Feb 2024	47	35	15	9	8	6	0	0	120	National–ACT–NZ First (64)
Taxpayers' Union–Curia 1–7 Feb 2024	49	34	11	17	6	6***	0	0	123	National–ACT (66)
Roy Morgan 8–28 Jan 2024	49	28	20	10	7	6	0	0	120	National–ACT–NZ First (66)
Roy Morgan Dec 2023 poll	46	28	20	12	8	8**	0	0	122	National–ACT–NZ First (66)
Curia 3–5 Dec 2023 poll	46	36	14	8	10	6	0	0	120	National–ACT-NZ First (64)
Taxpayers' Union–Curia 1–6 Nov 2023 poll	46	35	17	10	8	6**	0	0	122	National–ACT–NZ First (64)
2023 election result 14 Oct 2023	48	34	15	11	8	6**	0	0	122	National–ACT–NZ First (67)

* indicates an overhang seat

== See also ==
- Sixth National Government of New Zealand
- 2023 New Zealand general election
- Opinion polling for the 2023 New Zealand general election
- Politics of New Zealand
- Candidates in the 2026 New Zealand general election by electorate
