= New Zealand Young Nationals =

Political youth organization

- President: Kadin Good
- Vice President: Gabby Bird
- Founded: 14 May 1936; 90 years ago
- Ideology: Liberal conservatism Economic liberalism
- Position: Centre-right
- International: International Young Democrat Union
- Mother Party: New Zealand National Party
- Website: youngnats.org.nz

Elected National Team
- Secretary: Sam Plows
- Treasurer: Ben Teviotdale
- Policy Chair: Jack Rankin
- Membership Officer: Jackson Megaw
- Creative Director: Riley Mitchell

Elected Regional Chairs
- Northern: Ryan Maguire
- Central North Island: Josh McNamara
- Lower North Island: Hamish Ross
- Canterbury-Westland: Andrew Wormald
- Southern: Annabel McArthur

The New Zealand Young Nationals, more commonly called the Young Nats, is the youth wing of the National Party, a centre-right political party in New Zealand, and a member of the International Young Democrat Union.

== History ==
The National Party has had a youth section since its inception in 1936, and are a constituted youth wing of the National Party. The Young Nationals have been a strong lobby group inside the National Party, and often at the forefront of policy development being representative as a Core Group or a Policy Action Group of the party at varying times. For a short period during the party's earlier years there was a younger section of the National party for pre-teenage members but has since disappeared due to the changing environment of New Zealand politics and society.

Prior to the group being named the Young Nationals, the New Zealand National Party's Youth section was known as the Junior Nationals. In the lead up to the 1949 election, the Wellington branch had 3,500 members and the Auckland branch consisted of 2,500 members. The group hosted a number of community events such as dances, parties, debating or discussion, and lectures or addresses. In 1967 the group voted to change the name to the Young Nationals as Junior Nationals was seen to have potentially negative connotations. This renamed group attracted members for political reasons rather than social activities like its predecessor. In 1968 the National Party agreed to for two Young Nationals to sit on the party's Dominion Council. 1971 brought upon Young Nationals creating political discussion groups called 'Pol-link's' which enabled the group to research and discuss political issues allowing the National Party to understand the contemporary issues of young generations. In 2015 the Young Nationals claimed to have over 20,000 likes on their Facebook page and over 6,000 official members.

== Structure ==
In 2009, under major changes led by the organisation's governing executive, the Young Nationals were re-organised to serve as a more effective tool for policy activism and campaign activity.

=== Regional Teams ===
As of 2011, The Young Nationals are divided into five regions nationwide:

- Northern;
- Central North Island;
- Lower North Island;
- Canterbury-Westland; and
- Southern.

Each of these regions are headed by their own Chair and executive group and supervised by a National Executive, elected annually during the National Party Conference.

Some regions of the Young Nationals also may have branches. These include the Alfred Street Young Nationals, which are based in Auckland and considered a counter group to the Princes Street Labour movement and VicNats which is based around Victoria University. In 2011, the Young Nationals celebrated 75 years as New Zealand's oldest and largest political youth movement.

=== National team ===
The National Executive, are made up of elected members across New Zealand who, set the agenda and leadership for the Young Nationals during the year. There are currently 12 members. They are made of a:

- President;
- Vice-President;
- Secretary;
- Treasurer;
- Policy Chair;
- Membership Officer;
- Creative Director; and
- The Chairs of each of the Regional Executives

== Activities ==
=== Regional Events ===
Throughout the year each of the five Regions teams have a range of social events. These include, but are not limited to, coffee catch ups with MPs, social drinks and pub quizzes. Events are usually centred around the academic timetables of the universities in the regions. Additionally, regions will often host Christmas parties and Policy-based events.

=== Balls ===
From time to time the Young Nationals have organised balls. These balls are often held in Auckland and are open to members and non-members alike. The most recent ball was in 2021.

=== Young Nats Leadership Conference ===
In 2018, The Young Nationals re-commenced the Young Nats Conference. This conference is an opportunity for members from across the country to network, discuss policy issues and learn to campaign. In 2018, the Conference was held in Nelson, and was followed by a conference in Wellington in 2019, Queenstown in 2020 and Auckland in 2021.

== Policies ==
Often the more liberal views of the Young Nationals have been at odds with those of the wider party. The shift in party opinion in areas such as the nuclear ships debate, economic reform, liquor law reform, and anti-discrimination laws has often been influenced by the Young Nationals.

=== Drug Policy ===
==== Alcohol ====
The Young Nationals, in conjunction with other New Zealand political party youth wings, support the current purchase age for alcohol of 18 years. The Young Nationals lobbied the government in 2012 to keep the drinking age at 18 when the Sale and Supply of Liquor Act Amendment Bill was put by parliament. The Bill successfully passed. This position was reaffirmed in 2018.

==== Pill Testing ====
In late 2019, the Young Nationals moved to support pill testing at festivals and concerts. The Young Nationals noted that the position was in support of harm reduction, not a motion in support of drug use. In 2020, the Young Nats obtained some media attention as their position on this stance as the National Party decided to vote against legislation to allow for pill testing, making them the only party in parliament to do so. In 2021, the Young Nationals reaffirmed their position on pill testing with the President of the Young Nationals, Stephanie-Anne Ross, and then Policy Chair, Andrew Mahoney, presenting both in writing and in person their positions on the Drug and Substance Checking Legislation Bill (No 2) to the Health Select Committee despite the National Party reaffirming their position to vote against the bill.

=== Education ===
==== Polytechnic Autonomy ====
The National Party opposes the merging of Regional Polytechnics as legislated by the Sixth Labour Government of New Zealand. The Young Nationals have also supported this position publicly on the basis that polytechnics maintain regional autonomy and polytechnics maintain their assets.

==== Voluntary Student Unionism ====
The Young Nationals have lobbied the New Zealand Government to adopt and pass legislation that would move tertiary Students’ Associations to a system of voluntary membership. Currently, Student Union membership is compulsory in New Zealand for most university students. The Young Nationals, in conjunction with ACT on Campus, Free Me and other New Zealanders, were successful in winning select committee and subsequently government support to pass a private member's Bill by ACT MP Heather Roy to introduce voluntary membership to student associations in tertiary institutions. The Bill, Education (Freedom of Association) Amendment, was passed into law in September 2011, and took effect in 2012.

=== Employment ===
The Young Nationals support the creation of an income tax free threshold to assist individuals with the rising cost of living and the re-implementation of 90-day trial periods to increase youth employment.

=== Environment ===
The Young Nationals have supported the Zero Carbon Act since 2017 and have lobbied the National Party to support it since then. The Young Nationals have also supported the continuation of a green investment fund and the Implementation of a nationwide riparian management scheme.

=== Health Care ===
==== Mental Health ====
The Young Nationals, as part of their 2020 Policy Platform, support the creation of a contestable mental health first aid training fund to assist those seeking to undertake mental health first aid training programmes in New Zealand and the establishment of a Mental Health and Wellbeing Commission. The Young Nationals were credited by the National Party for their idea on mental health first aid and assistance in early intervention measures. In 2019, then President of the Young Nationals, Sam Stead, and Policy Chair, Andrew Mahoney, presented both in writing and in person their positions on the Mental Health and Wellbeing Commission to the Health Select Committee.

==== Sanitary Products in Schools ====
The Young Nationals support free provision of sanitary items in New Zealand schools.

=== LGBT Rights ===
The Young Nationals supported the legalisation of same-sex marriage in New Zealand, with members lobbying MPs for this change.

The Young Nationals support the banning of gay conversion therapy following membership consultation on the issue after Young Labour and the Young Greens petitioned for a ban. Despite, The National Party highlighting conversations with the Young Nationals were one of the leading reasons the Party would support the ban on gay conversion therapy the party determined to vote against a bill that would ban gay conversion therapy at first reading. The Young Nationals highlighted their disappointment publicly at this stance and in a speech at the National Party's 2021 annual conference the Young National President further highlighted their disappointment with the decision in front of the party's membership.

== Presidents ==
List of presidents of the Young Nationals:

- 1969–1970: Chris Whitta
- 1970–1971: Eric Bowell
- 1971–1972: Lachlan Ross
- 1972–1973: Paul Matheson
- 1973–1976: Murray McCully
- 1976–1978: S Pearson
- 1978–1980: Martin Gummer
- 1980–1981: Simon Upton
- 1981–1982: Peter Kiely
- 1982–1983: Stuart Boag
- 1983–1984: Alastair Bell
- 1984–1985: Mark Lowndes
- 1985–1986: Phil O'Reilly
- 1986–1987: Craig Allan
- 1987–1989: Andrew Harvey
- 1989–1990: Wayne P Marriott
- 1990-1990: Bruce Alabaster
- 1990–1991: Elaine Enright
- 1991–1995: Shane Frith
- 1995–1996: Sarah Borrell
- 1996–1997: Mel Davis
- 1997–1999: Tim Hurdle
- 1999–2001: Daniel Gordon
- 2001–2003: Grant Tyrrell
- 2003–2005: Jamie Simpson
- 2005–2006: Michael Mabbett
- 2006–2008: Matthew Patterson
- 2008–2009: Alex Mitchell
- 2009–2012: Daniel Fielding
- 2012–2015: Sean Topham
- 2015–2016: Joel Rowan
- 2016–2018: Stefan Sunde
- 2018–2021: Sam Stead
- 2021–2024: Stephanie-Anne Ross
- 2024–present: Kadin Good

== Political alumni ==
=== Prime Ministers, Leaders & Deputy Leaders ===
- Rt Hon Sir Robert Muldoon – Former Prime Minister (1975 - 1984)
- Rt Hon Sir Jack Marshall – Former Prime Minister (1972)
- Rt Hon Sir Bill English – Former Prime Minister (2016-2017) and Leader of the National Party (2001-2003; 2017-2018)
- Hon Simon Bridges – Former Leader of the National Party (2018-2020)
- Todd Muller – Former Leader of the Opposition and Leader of the National Party (2020)
- Hon Nikki Kaye – Former Deputy Leader (2020), Former Minister of Education (2017)
- Hon Dr Nick Smith – Former Deputy Leader (2002); Former Minister for Housing and the Environment.

=== Other Members of Parliament ===
- Rt Hon Winston Peters – Deputy Prime Minister (1996-1998; 2017-2020; 2023-), and Leader of New Zealand First (1993-)
- Rt Hon Simon Upton – Former MP, Former Minister of the Crown
- Dame Marilyn Waring – Former MP
- Hon Tony Ryall – Former MP, Former Minister for Health and State-Owned Enterprises
- Hon Murray McCully – Former MP, Former Minister of Foreign Affairs
- Rt Hon Jonathan Hunt ONZ – Former Labour Party MP and Speaker of the New Zealand House of Representatives
- Hon David Caygill – Former Labour MP, Former Minister of Finance
- Hon Roger Sowry – Former MP, Former Minister of Social Welfare
- Hon Ruth Richardson – Former MP, Former Minister of Finance
- Carl Bates - Current MP
- Katie Nimon - Current MP

=== Board Members ===
- John Slater – Former National Party President
- Michelle Boag – Former National Party President
- Peter Goodfellow – Former National Party President
- Sir George Chapman – Former National Party President
- Stefan Sunde – Current Board Member of the National Party
- David Ryan – Current Board Member of the National Party
- Alastair Bell – Former Board Member of the National Party

=== Other ===
- Michael Laws – Former Mayor of Wanganui and Radio Commentator
- David Farrar – Media Commentator
- Sean Topham – Founder of Topham Guerin
- Ben Guerin – Founder of Topham Guerin

==== Life members ====
- Peter Goodfellow – Former president of the New Zealand National Party
- Dr Rt Hon Lockwood Smith – Former Speaker of the New Zealand House of Representatives
- David Farrar – Kiwiblog and co-founder of New Zealand Taxpayers' Union

A number of other former members have taken up prominent roles across a number of sectors, such as Phil O'Reilly as CEO of Business New Zealand, John Marshall QC as President of the New Zealand Law Society and Paul Matheson as Mayor of Nelson.

== Controversies ==
=== Sexual Harassment ===
In 2018, after a Young National's Christmas drinks party at the Brew on Quay bar in Auckland, a woman, aged 17, and some friends went to a young man's apartment near the bar. The woman was allegedly groped, kissed, and continued to be followed after she left the apartment. The man was suspended from the party and police began investigating the incident.

The then National leader Simon Bridges said "I learned about it late [last] week. I sought assurances that everything had been handled and dealt with appropriately. It seems clear to me that it has: that they followed very strongly a health and safety plan and did all of the right things, both at the Young Nats event and post."

Judith Collins praised the response and said "If it's gone to police, that's a good place for it, and that's what the Labour Party should have done in the first place: taken it to police," in reference to Labour's response to Young Labour's sexual assault allegations.

=== Harassment of Politicians ===
In 2022, Young Nat member Jessee MacKenzie admitted creating social media accounts under fake names to harass and troll female politicians. One targeted politician, Sara Templeton, made an application to a district court under the Harmful Digital Communications Act, which revealed the IP address of the harassment to have come from a house owned by Bryce Beattie, also a Young Nats member, where MacKenzie lived. Both MacKenzie and Beattie resigned from the National Party.

== See also ==
- List of political parties in New Zealand
