= Kyla Campbell-Kamariera =

Political candidate in New Zealand general elections

- Born: 1997 or 1998 (age 28–29)
- Political party: Te Tai Tokerau Party (since 2026)
- Other political affiliations: Te Pāti Māori (2023–25)

Kyla Campbell-Kamariera (born 1997 or 1998) is a New Zealand activist and political candidate. She served as president of the Waikato Students' Union, and was one of nine rangatahi Māori to attend the 2025 COP30 conference. She stood on Te Pāti Māori's list in 2023, and is standing as a list candidate for Te Tai Tokerau Party at the 2026 election.

== Life and career ==
Campbell-Kamariera was born in 1997 or 1998. She is the eldest of four children, and was raised in Mitimiti. As a child, she attended Te Kura o Mātihetihe. She is of Te Rarawa, Te Aupōuri, and Taranaki Tūturu descent. Natanya Campbell and Wendy Campbell-Rodgers, her mother and grandmother, were killed in 2017. Months after this, Campbell-Kamariera underwent surgery to remove a brain tumour.

In early 2020, she began studying at the University of Waikato for a masters degree in Māori and Indigenous Studies, and became the president of the Waikato Students' Union. After six academics accused the University of Waikato of racism, Campbell-Kamariera was part of a taskforce to provide recommendations for change at the university.

At the 2023 New Zealand general election, she was ranked twenty-third on Te Pāti Māori's list.

She was put forward by her Te Rarawa iwi to be part of delegation of rangatahi Māori at the 2025 United Nations Climate Change Conference (COP30). At the time, Campbell-Kamariera was the chairwoman of the Mātihetihe Marae. She was one of nine rangatahi Māori at COP30, collectively known as Te Kāhu Pōkere. Their attendance at COP30 was organised by the National Iwi Chairs Forum.

Campbell-Kamariera, then the co-chair of Te Pāti Māori's Te Tai Tokerau electorate committee, said in November 2025 that Mariameno Kapa-Kingi had the backing and full support of Te Tai Tokerau. This was in response to comments by John Tamihere, president of Te Pāti Māori: Tamihere had called for Kapa-Kingi, the MP for Te Tai Tokerau, to step aside. Campbell-Kamariera also stated that Te Tai Tokerau's electorate committee would support a vote of no confidence in Tamihere.

She was announced in September 2026 as a list candidate for Te Tai Tokerau Party, a new political party founded by Kapa-Kingi. During the 2026 New Zealand general election held on 7 November, the Te Tai Tokerau Party received 1,168 party votes (0.04%), below the five percent threshold needed to enter Parliament. Kapa-Kingi also lost the Te Tai Tokerau electorate to Te Pāti Māori's candidate Aperahama Edwards.
