= TTTP =

TTTP may refer to:

- Te Tai Tokerau Party, political party in New Zealand
- The Time, The Place, a British television talk show
- Tko to tamo pjeva?, a Croatian television game show; part of the I Can See Your Voice franchise
