= David Farrar (blogger) =

New Zealand blogger and pollster (born 1967)

David P Farrar
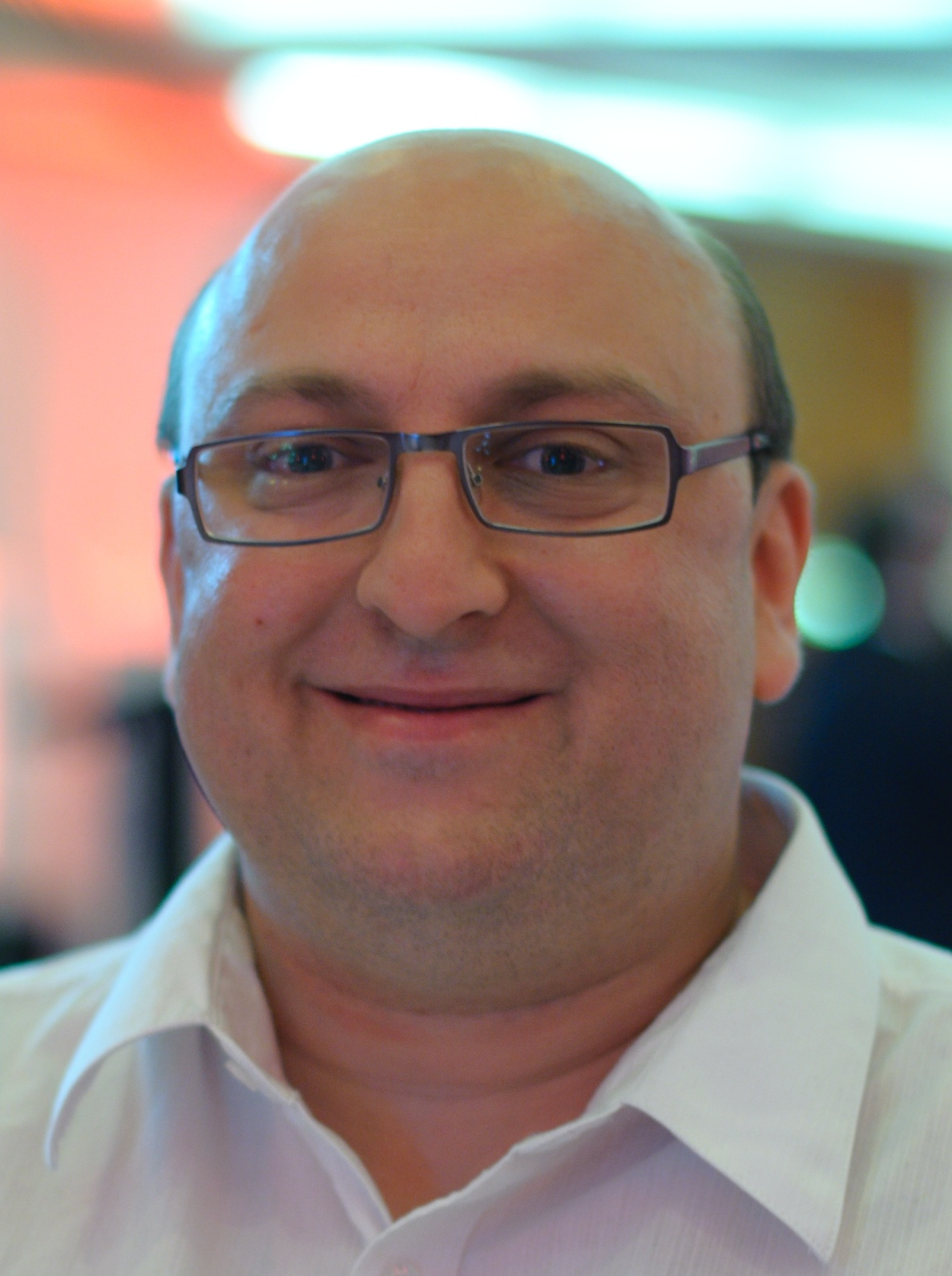
- Farrar in 2010 at the New Zealand Open Source Awards
- Born: 11 September 1967 (age 59)
- Education: University of Otago; Victoria University of Wellington
- Occupations: Blogger, pollster, political activist
- Website: kiwiblog.co.nz

David Peter Farrar (born 11 September 1967) is a New Zealand political activist, blogger and pollster. He is an infrequent commentator in the media on internet issues. Farrar manages his own market research company, Curia.

Farrar has held many roles within the New Zealand National Party and has worked in Parliament for four National Party leaders.

His blog, Kiwiblog, was the most widely read and commented on New Zealand blog in 2009. Farrar also maintains a presence on social networking sites Facebook and Twitter. In 2007 the National Business Review stated that: "Any realistic 'power list' produced in this country would include either Farrar or his fellow blogger and opinion leader Russell Brown."

== Education and personal life ==
Farrar was educated in Wellington, attending St Mark's Church School and Rongotai College. He is of Jewish descent on his father's side.

He studied at the University of Otago and later at Victoria University of Wellington. Farrar served on the council of Otago University as a student representative, was president of the Commerce Faculty Students' Association and chaired the Student Representative Council. While he was at the University of Otago, he was the Otago correspondent for Campus News an alternative student newspaper published by a group in Auckland but which was distributed nationwide. The newspaper was published between 1984 and 1988, and Farrar's involvement ran from 1985 to 1987.

== Career ==
In 2004, Farrar founded Curia Market Research. It regularly conducts nationally representative New Zealand opinion polling. Farrar was involved in the development of the New Zealand Political Polling Code.

Farrar was a member of the Market Research Society of New Zealand, which became part of the Research Association of New Zealand, formed in 2013 (https://www.researchassociation.org.nz/about-us). Along with his organisation Curia, he resigned from the Research Association of NZ because of their handling of complants. (https://www.kiwiblog.co.nz/2024/08/why_i_have_resigned_from_the_research_association_of_new_zealand.html).

He was vice-president of the Internet Society of New Zealand, InternetNZ and formerly a director of New Zealand Domain Name Registry Ltd (.nz Registry Services), and is a frequent commentator in both broadcast and print media on Internet issues.

Previously Farrar worked as a staff member of the Leader of the Opposition (1999–2004), a staff member at National Party Head Office (1999 and 2004), a staff member in Ministerial Services under Jim Bolger (1996–1997) and in the Prime Minister's Office under Jenny Shipley (1997–1999).

Farrar wrote weekly columns for the National Business Review and the iPredict futures site, and is an occasional commentator on Radio New Zealand and Newstalk ZB.

The New Zealand Listener 2009 Power List named Farrar the fourth most powerful person in the New Zealand media, saying "Kiwiblog has become part of the daily routine for Beltway insiders and others with an interest in politics and public policy."

== Political involvement ==
=== Taxpayers' Union ===
In 2013, Farrar, with Jordan Williams, established the fiscally conservative lobby group, the New Zealand Taxpayers' Union. The Union is based on the United Kingdom TaxPayers Alliance and resulted from both Farrar and Williams' interaction with that group's founder, Matthew Elliot, through the International Young Democrat Union.

=== Young Nationals ===
Farrar was previously national secretary of the youth wing of the New Zealand National Party, the Young Nationals. During his tenure as national secretary, he survived some media calls for his resignation when he was arrested for his part in a joke press release, along with fellow Young National Michael P Moore, announcing that maverick National MP Michael Laws had been assassinated and that the Prime Minister was one of over 10,000 suspects. The joke press-release was made with the New Zealand Police logo. Farrar and Moore were subsequently arrested, but not convicted of any crime as they chose to participate in a diversion scheme for first time offenders of minor crime. The fax and related media items are now displayed at the Backbencher Bar on Molesworth Street in Wellington, across the road from Parliament.

Farrar is an honorary life member of the Young Nationals, due to his many years of service to the organisation.

=== Campaign manager ===
At the 2005 general election Farrar was the volunteer campaign manager for National's Wellington Central candidate Mark Blumsky. Blumsky failed to win the electorate, but entered parliament via the party list.

=== Political views ===
Farrar professes a classical liberal approach to politics, and identifies as a moderate of the centre-right on the political spectrum. He was a co-chair of National's Classical Liberal Policy Advisory Group at its formation in 2004. He supported the legalisation of prostitution and of civil unions in New Zealand. Farrar supports a New Zealand republic and is on the National Council of New Zealand Republic campaign. Economically his views are more in keeping with those of parties to the right of the National Party, such as the libertarianism of the minority ACT party.

Farrar has appeared before Parliamentary select committees on a range of issues, including the Electoral Finance Bill and the Treaty Principles Bill. He often publishes his submissions on his blog.

== See also ==
- New Zealand blogosphere
