= Topham =

Topham may refer to:

- Topham, South Yorkshire, England

== People ==
- Topham Beauclerk (1739–1780), British entertainer
- Arthur Topham (1869–1931), England footballer
- Brandon Topham (born 1971), South African politician
- Edward Topham (1751–1820), English journalist, playwright, poet, and landowner from Wold Newton, Yorkshire
- Francis William Topham (1809–1877), English watercolorist and engraver
- Paula Topham (born 1944), actress in the television series Angel Pavement
- Robert Topham (footballer) (1867–1931), England footballer
- Sara Topham (born 1976), Canadian actress
- Thomas Topham (c. 1702–1749), English strongman
- Tony Topham (1929–2004), British academic and writer
- Top Topham (1947–2023), original lead guitarist in The Yardbirds

== Others ==
- Topham Chase, a National Hunt handicap chase in England
- Topham Guerin, a public relations company in New Zealand
- Sir Topham Hatt, the Fat Controller from The Railway Series and Thomas and Friends

== See also ==
- Topsham (disambiguation)
