= Blogging in New Zealand =

Blogging community

Blogging in New Zealand is dominated by a community of around 600 blogs that comment largely on New Zealand politics, society and occurrences. One list of over 200 "author-operated, public discourse" blogs in New Zealand (ranked according to traffic, links incoming, posting frequency and comments) suggests New Zealand blogs cover a wide range of ideological positions but lack female contributors. Blogging is an active part of the media of New Zealand.

Some personal blogs have been around since the mid 1990s, but there are now blogs about cities, science, law, travel and fashion magazines. Political bloggers include current and former party apparatchiks such as David Farrar (Kiwiblog), Jordan Carter, Peter Cresswell and Trevor Loudon, and journalists and commentators such as Russell Brown and Martyn Bradbury.

== Political blogs ==
New Zealand politicians and political groups operate political blogs which, unlike overseas counterparts, allow comments. The former ACT party leader Rodney Hide often comments from within the House of Representatives and Craig Foss operates a personal blog. The Green Party expands on party press releases, and Labour MPs discuss policy and Parliamentary business. Blogging is a central campaigning tool for many political lobbying groups.

=== Relationship to politics ===
A 2007 New Zealand Herald article by Bill Ralston described political bloggers as being potentially the most powerful "opinion makers" in New Zealand politics. A few weeks earlier the National Business Review had stated that, "Any realistic 'power list' produced in this country would include either [David] Farrar or his fellow blogger and opinion leader Russell Brown." And in 2008 The Press said that year's election "could be the time when New Zealand's burgeoning political bloggers finally make their presence felt". The article saw the increasing influence of the Internet (as opposed to television and radio) on people's lives and the number of professional journalists now maintaining blogs as the reason for the blogosphere's increased significance, alongside the fact that unlike newspapers blogs can link directly to facts and sources.

The blogosphere has also made an impact on parliament – Russell Brown is quoted as saying, "Every now and then you see a line from the blog turn up in a parliamentary speech" and in December 2007 then prime minister Helen Clark accused political journalists of "rushing to judgment" on their blogs.

Much of the research conducted on the New Zealand political blogosphere has conducted by Kane Hopkins and Donald Matheson. Their studies looked at how blogs were used during the 2005 and 2008 general elections, particularly what role blogs played in enhancing discourse on important election issues and possible implications on deliberative democracy. One study showed that blogs did little to determine mainstream media agendas, instead they were included to respond to and follow traditional media narratives.

Another study highlighted the significant growth of participation in a blogs comments section between the 2005 and 2008 general elections. For example, analysis showed that in Kiwiblog the number of comments in comparative sample grew from 2177 (from 401 individuals) to 6547 comments (from 532 individuals). However, the number of people who participated in the comments sections regularly (that is, they made more than 10 comments) was fewer than 100 individuals.

=== Controversies ===
Tim Selwyn, an Auckland man convicted of sedition in 2006, is also a prominent blogger, often bringing up controversial points. The pamphlet for which he was convicted and imprisoned on a charge of sedition was published on his website. Selwyn was also criticised in parliament for sending letters about his prison experiences to his co-blogger Martyn Bradbury, who posted them on the blog.

In January 2007 another controversial blog, CYFS Watch, appeared. The blog's stated aim was unveiling examples of alleged incompetence by the Child Youth and Family Service (known by its acronym CYFS) of the Ministry of Social Development. The Ministry responded to the publication of the blog, which published the details of several social workers, by complaining to internet company Google. The blog remained online until 22 February 2007 when Google deleted the site, due to the anonymous blogger making death threats towards Green MP Sue Bradford because of her Crimes (Abolition of Force as a Justification for Child Discipline) Amendment Bill 2005.

On 23 December 2009, Cameron Slater was charged with five counts of breaching name suppression orders. The charges relate to two blog posts that contained pictures which reveal the identities of two New Zealanders. On 11 January 2010, Slater published a blog post that used binary and hexadecimal code to reveal the identity of a person charged with indecent assault on a 13-year-old girl. The Nelson Bays police announced that they would investigate this further breach of New Zealand's name suppression laws.

On 1 June 2010, Dannevirke blogger Henk van Helmond was convicted of breaching a name suppression order and given a suspended sentence. The judge suppressed the publication of any details which might identify van Helmond's blog.

== Relationship with media ==
The majority of bloggers still rely upon the media for the provision of news stories to comment upon. However, they do not repeat the news, instead putting forward their viewpoint on it. The mainstream media at first was highly critical of bloggers. In January 2007 The New Zealand Herald printed an editorial that stated "[M]ost bloggers – and we're talking 95 per cent – are fly-by-night, gutless wonders who prefer to spit inarticulate venom under inarticulate pseudonyms." Since then though the newspaper has picked up multiple stories first broken on blogs (see below).

Some current and former bloggers have worked in or for the media industry, such as Russell Brown, Keith Ng, Tze Ming Mok and Dave Crampton. Political scientist Bryce Edwards who maintains the liberation blog has also been a guest columnist for The New Zealand Herald as has Geoffrey Miller of Douglas to Dancing.

== Breaking news ==
There have been many notable examples of bloggers breaking news stories and then having the media pick it up. For instance, Idiot/Savant found that neither Rodney Hide nor Heather Roy had been showing up to Parliament and consequently the ACT party had not voted in the 2006 budget debate. The story was subsequently picked up by the media. In February 2008 a blog post by Russell Brown about the Wikipedia article on Bill English being edited from a computer at Parliament received coverage in The New Zealand Herald. The story had first been broken on The Standard, a blog with links to the Labour Party.

A similar story was that of a computer at Air New Zealand being used to edit the Wikipedia article on Air New Zealand Flight 901 which was first mentioned on a website and later picked up by The Press. In April 2008, blogger David Farrar revealed the Green Party's preliminary party list. The story was subsequently picked up by NZPA. In June blogger 'Skinny' revealed that a photo used in promotional material about the 2008 budget was of an American family, not a New Zealand one, and the story was then published in The New Zealand Herald.

== Local blogs ==
There are numerous personal blogs. They range from music blogs to group blogs to local blogs. There are many long-running personal blogs, which have been around since the mid- or late-1990s, including Joanna McLeod (1998), Paul Reynolds (1997–2010), Robyn Gallagher (1996), and Bruce Simpson (1995).

With the development of the fashion industry in New Zealand, a lot of fashion blogs have appeared, most of them being online magazines. They include Thread, NZ Girl, Fashion NZ, Style Keeper, Stolen Inspiration, Lost in the Haze and The Late Club. A group of science, technology and medical bloggers are operating through the Science Media Centre and Royal Society of New Zealand.
