= Topsham =

Topsham may refer to:

== United Kingdom ==
- Topsham, Devon
  - Topsham railway station

== United States ==
- Topsham, Maine
  - Topsham (CDP), Maine
- Topsham, Vermont

== See also ==
- Topham (disambiguation)
