= Kiwiblog =

New Zealand political blog

- Screen shot of Kiwiblog, 7 December 2008
- Website type: National Party blog
- Website: www.kiwiblog.co.nz

Kiwiblog is a New Zealand political blog written by pollster and classic-liberal National Party-aligned political activist David Farrar.

Farrar started the blog in July 2003 at the instigation of then-prominent New Zealand blogger Gordon King. Farrar, who had previously mentioned that he had collaborators in writing the blog, in 2011 referred to an editorial team of five. A National Business Review column stated in 2007 that "any realistic 'power list' produced in this country would include either Farrar or his fellow blogger and opinion leader Russell Brown." In August 2006 the then National Party leader Don Brash commented on the blog.

== See also ==
- Blogging in New Zealand
