= Te Tai Tokerau Party =

- Abbreviation: TTTP
- Leader: Mariameno Kapa-Kingi
- Founder: Mariameno Kapa-Kingi
- Founded: 11 May 2026
- Registered: 5 August 2026
- Split from: Te Pāti Māori
- Ideology: Tino rangatiratanga
- Colors: Brown

Website
- tetaitokerauparty.org.nz

Te Tai Tokerau Party is a political party in New Zealand. Founded in 2026 by Te Tai Tokerau MP Mariameno Kapa-Kingi, it stood two candidates in the 2026 New Zealand general election, none of whom were successful. Kapa-Kingi was elected with Te Pāti Māori in 2023, but was suspended and expelled in 2025, in actions that were subsequently overturned by the High Court.

== Background ==
Mariameno Kapa-Kingi was elected to the New Zealand Parliament representing Te Tai Tokerau in 2023, as a member of Te Pāti Māori. Following tensions between Kapa-Kingi and the leadership of Te Pāti Māori, she was suspended from the party in October 2025, and expelled by a vote of Te Pāti Māori's National Council in the weeks after. The High Court ruled in March 2026 that Kapa-Kingi's suspension and expulsion was unlawful. Justice Paul Radich found that the proceedings did not comply with the party's kawa, and that the tikanga principles required by Te Pāti Māori's constitution were not upheld. Kapa-Kingi described the ruling as "justice [for] Te Tai Tokerau voters", and said that she would seek to stand again for Te Tai Tokerau at the 2026 election.

While Te Pāti Māori accepted the ruling and began voting on Kapa-Kingi's behalf in Parliament, Stuff reported on 8 May 2026 that Kapa-Kingi and Te Pāti Māori were not working together, and that issues Kapa-Kingi had wished to resolve before rejoining Te Pāti Māori remained unresolved.

== Foundation and 2026 election ==
Kapa-Kingi announced the formation of Te Tai Tokerau Party on 11 May 2026. Kapa-Kingi said she would only return to Te Pāti Māori if party president John Tamihere stood down, Te Tai Tonga MP Tākuta Ferris was returned to the party, and a public apology from the party leadership was given. She stated that the process of her reinstatement to Te Pāti Māori had not "occurred in any real, substantial way". Kapa-Kingi's announcement was reported as a split from Te Pāti Māori.

Kapa-Kingi cited "tino rangatiratanga, local decision-making and mana mokopuna" as foundational principles of the party. In an interview with The Hui, Kapa-Kingi described her focus as "whare, whenua and whānau", (Note: This was translated by The Hui as meaning "housing, land and family".) and said her new party was designed specifically for the electorate of Te Tai Tokerau. In the same interview, she said that she would consider working with the National Party after the 2026 election if party leader Christopher Luxon sought her support.

At a media conference the day after, Kapa-Kingi said that near 200 people had joined the party as dues-paying members, with 500 required to be registered. She said that the party had not yet decided whether to run candidates outside of Te Tai Tokerau, although it was being considered, and that she would not rule out working with any party in Parliament. Eru Kapa-Kingi, Mariameno Kapa-Kingi's son, celebrated the party's launch but said he would keep his involvement in politics limited, focusing instead on advocacy and education.

In response to her announcement, Te Pāti Māori wished Kapa-Kingi well but confirmed that they would stand a candidate in all seven Māori electorates at the 2026 election. Later in the month, Aperahama Edwards was announced as the Te Pāti Māori candidate in Te Tai Tokerau. Both Labour leader Chris Hipkins and National minister Chris Bishop suggested that the name of the new party would fall foul of electoral law, due to it being named for the electorate of Te Tai Tokerau.

Te Tai Tokerau Party was registered by the Electoral Commission on 5 August. The Electoral Commission considered the possibility of the party name confusing or misleading voters, but decided that the chance of this happening was not likely enough to refuse registration.

The party stood two candidates at the 2026 election: Kapa-Kingi in Te Tai Tokerau, and Kyla Campbell-Kamariera as a list-only candidate. Kapa-Kingi is the party's leader. Campbell-Kamariera is a former student organiser at the University of Waikato, and has previously served as co-chair of Te Pāti Māori's electorate executive in Te Tai Tokerau. Kapa-Kingi campaigned for both the party vote and the candidate vote in Te Tai Tokerau. She said that a high enough party vote for her party could see both her and Campbell-Kamariera elected, potentially resulting in four wāhine Māori from Tai Tokerau being elected to parliament. (Note: The Green and Labour candidates in Te Tai Tokerau, Willow-Jean Prime and Hūhana Lyndon, both had high list rankings on their respective party lists that could have seen them elected regardless of winning the electorate.) The party has positioned itself as an advocate for Te Tai Tokerau, and for centering mokopuna in decision-making.

At the general election held on 7 November, Te Tai Tokerau Party received 1,168 party votes (0.04%) based on preliminary results, below the five percent threshold needed to enter Parliament. Kapa-Kingi came fourth place in the electorate of Te Tai Tokerau with 4,059 votes. The electorate is projected to be retaken by Te Pāti Māori's candidate Aperahama Edwards. Following her election loss, Kapa-Kingi said that she would continue to build Te Tai Tokerau Party, with mokopuna and wāhine Māori centred in its decision making.
