= Topham Guerin =

Advertising Company in New Zealand

- Industry: Advertising; Digital Marketing; Marketing
- Founded: 2016
- Headquarters: Auckland, New Zealand
- Key people: Sean Topham (founding partner), Ben Guerin (founding partner)
- Website: tophamguerin.com

Topham Guerin is an advertising agency company founded in New Zealand in 2016 by Sean Topham and Ben Guerin. The company is headquartered in Auckland and has offices in London and Sydney. It has worked on several high-profile political communications campaigns, including the 2019 Conservative Party election campaign in the UK.

== History ==
=== Origins ===
Before the founding of their company, Sean Topham and Ben Guerin studied at universities in New Zealand. Both were members of the Young Nationals, a youth group of the New Zealand National Party. Sean Topham was the group's president from 2012 to 2015. The company was responsible for political communications for the British Conservative Party in the 2019 general election, and has worked for the Liberal Party of Australia. In a 2020 interview with the New Zealand current affairs website The Spinoff, Topham said, "The agency is not political. We work for our clients and deliver the best possible work that we can. We've had particular clients in that [conservative] space, and that's par for the course. Some people will suggest there's some narrative there, but I don't think that's accurate."

=== 2019 Australian federal election ===
While working for the Liberal Party during the 2019 Australian federal election, Topham Guerin found success at engaging older people by creating purposefully low-quality memes that would generate a high organic reach. One anonymous individual who worked on this project dubbed the strategy 'boomer memes', according to The Sydney Morning Herald.

Following the Australian Liberal Party's victory in the 2019 elections, Ben Guerin spoke at the right-wing Friedman Conference to discuss its PR strategy. "You've got to surprise people. You've got to shock people. Unlock and arouse emotion in people," Guerin said. "The particular emotions we've got to unlock are arousal emotions. We're talking: anger, excitement, pride, fear. Your content should be relating to one of these emotions for anyone to give a damn about it".

The Guardian called Topham Guerin's approach to campaigning "a 24-hour meme machine – a social media firehose of attention-grabbing, emotion-manipulating, behaviour-nudging messaging."

=== 2019 British general election ===
During the 2019 United Kingdom general election, Topham Guerin created an advert for the Conservative Party's 2019 election campaign, which featured Boris Johnson in a parody of a scene from the film Love Actually. The advert was "shot quickly on an iPhone to take up as little of the leader's time as possible and to get into the algorithmic churn almost immediately," Oliver Henry said in 2020

In addition, Topham Guerin changed the name of the Conservative Party's Twitter account to "factcheckUK," using the report to attack the Labour Party and its leader Jeremy Corbyn.

=== COVID-19 pandemic communications ===
The company has won several contracts for PR work for the UK government since the start of the COVID-19 pandemic. As the government invoked emergency contracting regulations, at least one of these contracts was awarded directly to Topham Guerin without going to tender.

Topham Guerin was reported to be responsible for a UK government COVID-19 advert encouraging people to stay at home, criticized for being sexist in depicting gender roles. The ad sparked complaints due to the depiction of domestic tasks being handled by women, while the only visible male figure on the image was relaxing on a sofa.

During the COVID-19 pandemic in New Zealand, Topham Guerin was briefly contracted by the New Zealand Government in March 2020 to produce COVID-19 social media memes encouraging people to stay at home and comply with Government lockdown restrictions. Police Commissioner Mike Bush played a key role in securing the company's contract. While the contract was supposed to last for three months, Guerin's contract was canceled after three weeks. Though some of its output was well received, its memes were also criticised for their lack of consistency, confusing messaging, insufficient output, perceived ugliness. In response to criticism, Topham defended the effectiveness of "shitty memes." A meme describing the COVID-19 pandemic as a dragon also drew criticism from the New Zealand Police for its perceived insensitivity to Chinese New Zealanders.

In November 2020, the London Review of Books reported that Guerin and Isaac Levido, another well known Conservative Party PR man, created the government's slogan, 'Stay alert, control the virus, and save lives.'

In November 2020, the firm was working on a campaign for the Association of the British Pharmaceutical Industry to promote the COVID-19 vaccine.

=== 2021 Canadian federal election ===
In 2021, they were engaged by the Conservative Party of Canada, along with UK-based Stack Data Strategy, to work on the party's national campaign for the 2021 Canadian federal election.

=== 2025 Australian federal election ===
In 2024, a senior Liberal Party source confirmed that Peter Dutton hired Topham Guerin for the campaign. For the campaign, Topham Guerin is trying to humanise Dutton much like they did for Christopher Luxon for the 2023 election. Topham Guerin is focusing on video content platforms such as TikTok with Dutton creating a personal account in early 2024.

Guerin said "The key lesson of whether you’re doing political campaigning in New Zealand, the UK, anywhere else, or if you’re selling anything at all, is just finding ways to make it entertaining so that you can win that battle of t thumbs. Get people to stop scrolling, watch your ad through and hopefully do something off the back of it."

Topham Guerin has been working closely with the conservative lobby group Advance in the use of digital platforms.

In October 2024, Topham Guerin was hired by ACT Liberals creating AI-generated content and is credited for the Liberal National Party's success of the 2024 Queensland state election.

== Controversies ==
In 2019, The Guardian reported that Topham Guerin worked for Conservative Party strategist Sir Lynton Crosby's CTF Partners to create a "large-scale professional disinformation network on behalf of paying clients including major polluters, the Saudi Arabian government, anti-cycling groups and various foreign political campaigns" on Facebook.

While working as subcontractors for Crosby's CTF Partners, "Topham gained a reputation for misogyny within the company" after celebrating women's departure from the company.

An article published on 31 December 2023 in The Observer reported on the Good Law Project's allegations of leaked emails between Topham Guerin and its client Palantir to discredit the Good Law Project for launching legal action regarding Palantir's acquisition of patient data from NHS England.

== Public engagement ==
On 8 May 2021, for World Ovarian Cancer Day, Topham Guerin participated in the Cure our Ovarian Cancer Foundation's international awareness campaign. Their spot "An ad you can't miss, for a cancer you do", which shows 30 women who had been diagnosed with ovarian cancer, was screened at Piccadilly Circus, London and Time Square, New York City. The spot was a pro bono production by Topham Guerin with Landsec and JCDecaux sponsoring the screening space.
