= Pol-link =

Ginger group in New Zealand politics

- Secretary: Julian Watts (1971–77)
- Founders: John Schnellenberg; Julian Watts
- Founded: 1971
- Dissolved: 1977
- Ideology: Classical liberalism Neoliberalism
- National affiliation: National Party (unofficial)

Pol-link was a ginger group inside the New Zealand National Party in the 1970s and 1980s. Self describing as a 'think tank', Pol-link primarily advocated for classical liberalism and laissez-faire economics especially among younger party members.

== History ==
Pol-link was founded in 1971 by Jewish businessman John Schnellenberg, to promote liberal principles and "forward-looking" policies. It was an independent organisation to the National Party but stated its purpose was influencing the party's policy by providing it new research and ideas. Its first chairman was John Marshall, the son of then National Prime Minister Jack Marshall. Initially Wellington based, by 1973 it had expanded to have a branch in Christchurch.

At National's 1973 divisional annual meetings, Pol-Link members tried to influence the party leadership towards less conservative policy on abortion and law and order. On industrial relations, Pol-link advocated for supervised secret ballots of all union members before any strike action could be taken, stating "workers — not union officials — should have the right to decide themselves whether to withdraw their labour."

Members of Pol-link were very critical of Marshall's removal as National leader in July 1974 and his replacement with Robert Muldoon. Most Pol-link members were younger urban liberals and Muldoon's leadership was viewed by them as a reassertion of the older generation's conservative values on the party. Members such as Schnellenberg and Julian Watts were openly critical of Muldoon's replacement of Marshall and Pol-link were to be oppositional to Muldoon and his policies for the remainder of his leadership. Formally, Pol-link disbanded after the resignation of Watts as secretary in 1977. However, it continued informally for several years and had an impact on the party with many of its members becoming National MPs in the 1980s. When Muldoon lost the leadership in 1984 to the more liberal Jim McLay, Muldoon blamed "undesirable" elements in the party even going as far as to name Watts as being among them. Watts said the party could be rebuilt in a less Muldoonist image under the new leadership.

== Notable members ==
- Barry Brill
- Jonathan Elworthy
- John Falloon
- Doug Kidd
- Jim McLay
- Murray McCully
- Ruth Richardson
- Guy Salmon
- Roger Sowry
- Hugh Templeton
- Sue Wood
