= Russell Brown (media commentator) =

New Zealand media commentator

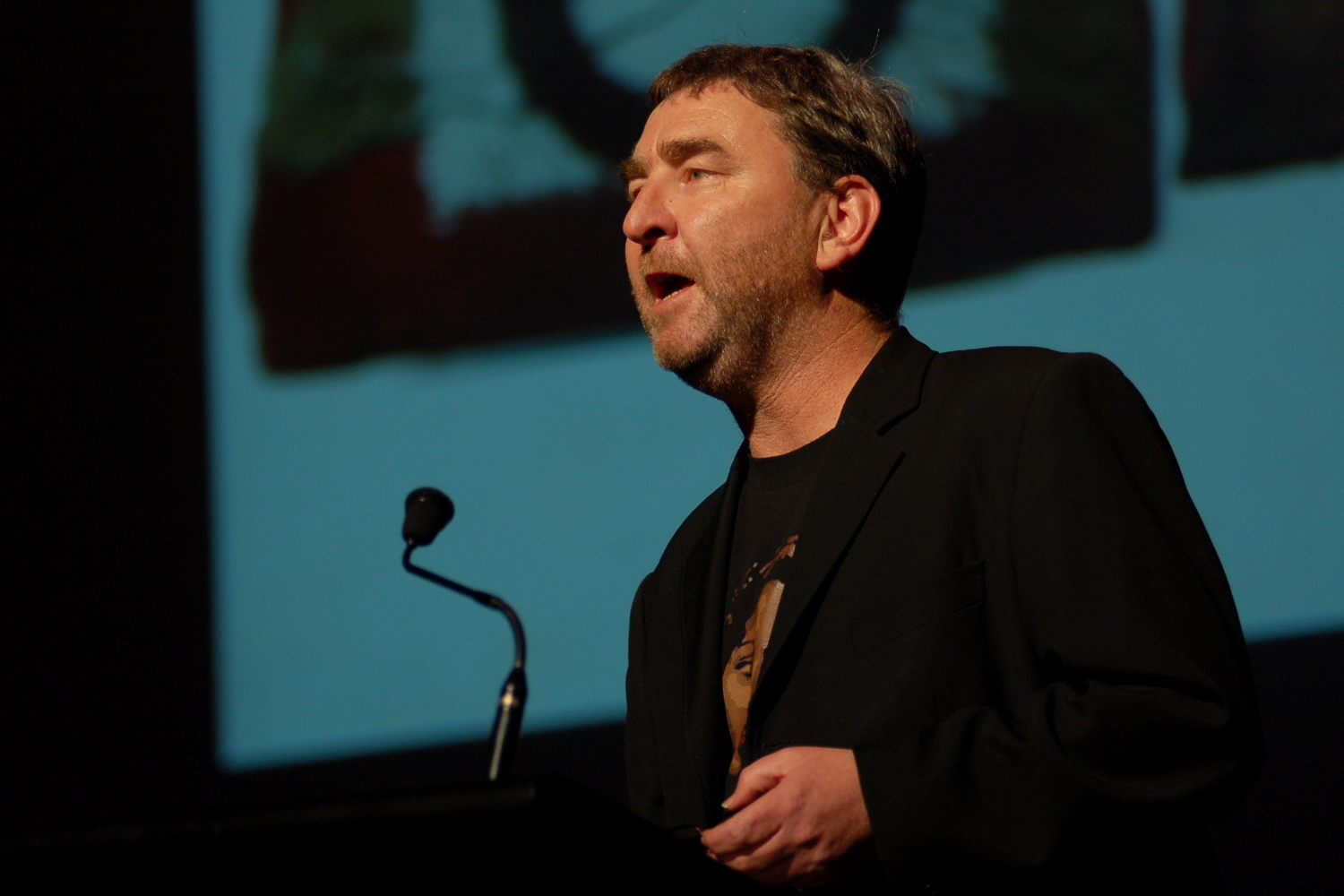
- Russell Brown at the Orcon Great Blend in August 2011.
- Born: 1962 (age 63–64); Lower Hutt, New Zealand
- Occupations: Blogger, journalist, television presenter, media commentator
- Known for: Public Address, Media7
- Website: publicaddress.net/hardnews/

Russell Brown (born 1962) is a New Zealand media commentator, and the owner of the Public Address community of blogs, and writes the blog Hard News.

== Early life ==
Brown was born in Lower Hutt, New Zealand.

He had a bronchial issues as a child so was frequently home sick from school. He describes himself as a "bright" child who liked to read.

== Career ==
The origins of Hard News was the Hard News radio segment written by Brown from 1991 to 2002 on Auckland student radio station bFM. The text of the radio commentary was circulated on the internet by various means from 1993, and the bulletin officially became a blog with the launch of Public Address in November 2002.

Brown's journalism career began in the early 1980s with the Christchurch Star and the music zine Rip It Up. In 1986, he moved to England where he wrote for various publications, mostly covering the music industry, before returning to New Zealand in 1991. From 2008 to 2012, he presented the media commentary programme Media7 on the TVNZ 7 digital channel. Following the closure of TVNZ 7 after its funding was not renewed, the show was picked up by TV3 in 2013 and renamed Media3 for one further series, however TV3 declined to produce any more series. In 2014, it re-appeared on Māori Television as Media Take and ran for four seasons until 2017.

== Personal life ==
He lives in Auckland, with his long-term partner journalist Fiona Rae. They have two sons, who are both autistic.

== See also ==
- New Zealand blogosphere
