= Aperahama Edwards =

New Zealand Māori leader

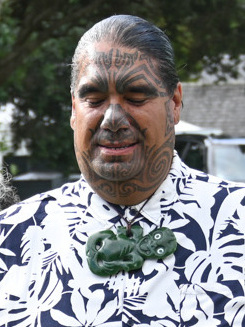
- Edwards in 2026

Chairman of Ngātiwai
- Incumbent
- Assumed office 31 July 2020
- Preceded by: Haydn Edmonds

Personal details
- Party: Te Pāti Māori (≤2026–present)

Aperahama Edwards is a New Zealand Māori tribal leader. He is currently chairman of the Ngātiwai Trust Board, the legal entity representing the people and hapū of Ngātiwai iwi. He is running for Te Tai Tokerau in the 2026 New Zealand general election as Te Pāti Māori's candidate.

== Iwi governance ==
Edwards was part of the three-person team behind Hinemoana Halo, a carbon offset conservation scheme that aimed to protect marine biodiversity in New Zealand and the Pacific.

== Ngātiwai Trust Board chairmanship ==
Edwards was elected chairman of the iwi board on 31 July 2020 following a hui ('meeting') by board trustees. He had been a trustee on the board for four years prior, and was the chairman of the iwi's Treaty Claims Committee. He replaced outgoing chairman Haydn Edmonds.

Edwards was removed from the public gallery of the New Zealand Parliament following his interruption of a debate on proposed changes to the law that would make it harder for Māori to secure customary marine title to the foreshore and seabed. After ACT's Todd Stephenson finished speaking in support of the changes, Edwards interjected "Ko wai hoki rātou? Who do they think they are?"

During a speech by ACT leader David Seymour at Waitangi in 2025, Edwards removed the microphone twice. Edwards told Stuff that it had become clear to him that Seymour was "fanning the flames of hurt and pain" during his speech. Edwards was one of only two speakers from the mana whenua that day, a sign of anger towards the government.

== Te Pāti Māori, 2026–present ==
New Zealand Parliament
Years	Term	Electorate	Party
2026–present	55th	Te Tai Tokerau	Te Pāti Māori

In May 2026, Edwards was selected by Te Pāti Māori as their candidate for Te Tai Tokerau at the 2026 New Zealand general election following incumbent Te Tai Tokerau MP Mariameno Kapa-Kingi's split from Te Pāti Māori. On 7 November, Edwards unseated Kapa-Kingi, winning the Te Tai Tokerau electorate by 8,484 votes based on preliminary results.
