= Mariameno Kapa-Kingi =

New Zealand politician (born 1960 or 1961)

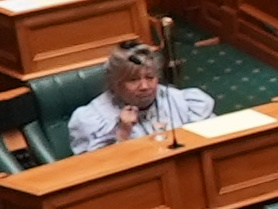
- Kapa-Kingi in 2025

Member of the New Zealand Parliament for Te Tai Tokerau
- In office 14 October 2023 – 7 November 2026
- Preceded by: Kelvin Davis
- Succeeded by: Aperahama Edwards
- Majority: 517 (1.86%)

Personal details
- Born: 1960 or 1961 (age 64–65)
- Party: Te Pāti Māori until 2026; Te Tai Tokerau Party from 2026
- Children: 4, including Eru

Mariameno Kapa-Kingi (born 1960 or 1961) is a New Zealand politician who represents Te Tai Tokerau in the New Zealand House of Representatives. After several decades in iwi social and health services, she was elected at the 2023 general election representing Te Pāti Māori.

In November 2025, Kapa-Kingi was expelled from the party, but was reinstated in March 2026 following a High Court challenge. On 11 May 2026, she announced she would start her own Te Tai Tokerau Party to contest the 2026 New Zealand general election.

== Early life ==
Kapa-Kingi was born in Te Kao, the daughter of Paratene Tipene Kapa of Te Aupōuri and Te Auraki of Ngāti Kahu ki Whangaroa iwi. When her father failed to get a bank loan to develop his farm, the family moved to Onerahi in Whangārei, where Kapa-Kingi was raised. She worked in iwi health and social services for more than thirty years. She helped develop health provider Te Kohao in Hamilton, and worked in suicide prevention and homelessness services. Before entering Parliament, Kapa-Kingi was a project specialist for Te Rūnanga o Whaingaroa, chief executive of Te Rūnanga Nui o Te Aupōuri Trust, the post-settlement governance entity for her iwi, and was involved in the iwi response to COVID-19 in the Far North. She said it was her involvement in the community response to COVID-19 that inspired her to enter politics.

== Political career ==
New Zealand Parliament
Years	Term	Electorate	List	Party
2023–2025	54th	Te Tai Tokerau	7	Te Pāti Māori
2025–2026	Changed allegiance to:			Independent
2026	Changed allegiance to:			Te Pāti Māori
2026	Changed allegiance to:			Independent

=== 2020 general election ===
On 17 May 2020, Mariameno Kapa-Kingi was selected as the Māori Party candidate for Te Tai Tokerau in the 2020 election. She came second to Labour's Kelvin Davis, who won with a margin of more than 8000 votes. Davis had been Labour Party deputy leader since 2017.

=== 2023 general election ===
Kapa-Kingi was selected again in 2023. The incumbent, Davis, had after the 2020 election become minister for children, and over several controversies, he faced strong criticism by the Māori Party. Kapa-Kingi advocated strongly for children, thus exploiting Davis' political vulnerability. Based on preliminary results published on election night, Davis had held the seat with 487 votes ahead of Kapa-Kingi. When final results were published on 3 November, the lead had been reversed and Kapa-Kingi was elected as the MP for Te Tai Tokerau, beating the incumbent by 517 votes. Davis was re-elected via Labour's party list, but in mid-December 2023 he announced his retirement from politics effective Waitangi Day 2024.

=== Te Pāti Māori, 2023–2026 ===
By mid-December 2023, Kapa-Kingi had become Te Pāti Māori's whip and joined Parliament's business select committee. She also became the party's housing, Oranga Tamariki, children, infrastructure, building and construction, transport, regional development, rural communities, local defence, civil government and small businesses spokesperson.

In early May 2024, Kapa-Kingi gave a speech in Parliament accusing the National-led coalition government of embarking on a "mission to exterminate Māori" by seeking to repeal Section 7AA of the Oranga Tamariki Act 1989. During her speech, she said "I might be tempted to change tone and say: Pai ana, get rid of Section 7AA, and while you're at it get rid of the entire act and the rotten institution that is Oranga Tamariki, which should in fact be named matenga tamariki (killing children) because it and its predecessor has only caused strife and ruin." Kapa-Kingi's remarks drew criticism from National Party leader Christopher Luxon and Labour Party leader Chris Hipkins, who described her rhetoric and language as "unhelpful." Labour MP Willie Jackson and Green MP Hūhana Lyndon criticised Kapa-Kingi's choice of words. New Zealand First leader Winston Peters also denounced her speech as "ignorant and offensive" while ACT Party leader David Seymour described her comments as "disgraceful," adding that the three coalition parties had Māori members. By contrast, Te Pāti Māori co-leaders Rawiri Waititi and Debbie Ngarewa-Packer defended Kapa-Kingi's speech and accused the Government of seeking to exterminate Māori through its policies and processes.

In a September 2025 reshuffle, Kapa-Kingi was replaced as party whip by co-leader Debbie Ngarewa-Packer. In mid-September 2025, Te Pāti Māori President John Tamihere said that Kapa-Kingi had been demoted as party whip due to the perception she had become tethered to Parliament and that she needed to reconnect with her electorate constituents. On 14 October, Te Pāti Māori released an email to its members containing several attached documents with serious allegations against Kapa-Kingi and her son, former party vice-president and Toitu Te Tiriti movement leader Eru Kapa-Kingi. These documents included a letter from Parliamentary service to Kapa-Kingi warning that her office had exceeded its budget by NZ$133,000, had failed to pay her parliamentary staffers, and separate allegations that Eru had racially abused a Parliamentary security guard on Budget Day in 2024. In early October 2025, her son Eru had severed Toitu Te Tiriti's ties to Te Pāti Māori, alleging a lack of accountability and transparency. Kapa-Kingi said her budget had not been overspent, because it had been adjusted to allow for support for Takutai Tarsh Kemp before her death.

On 28 October 2025, Waatea News reported that Te Pāti Māori had voted to suspend Kapa-Kingi on 23 October, saying that Te Tai Tokerau Electorate Executive was "no longer functioning in accordance with party requirements and the kawa (constitution)" and that Kapa-Kingi had breached the kawa. On 3 November, Tamihere called on Kapa-Kingi and fellow TPM MP Tākuta Ferris to resign, accusing the duo of "greed, avarice, and entitlement" and attempting to overthrow the party's co-leaders Waititi and Ngarewa-Packer. Despite attempts at mediation by the National Iwi Chairs Forum, the national council of Te Pāti Māori subsequently voted to expel Kapa-Kingi and Ferris on 9 November. In response, she denounced the decision as "unconstitutional" and vowed to appeal it "in all respects."

On 21 November, RNZ reported that Te Pāti Māori had declined an invitation by the iwi/tribe Ngāpuhi's rūnanga (governing body) chair Rūnanga Mane Tahere to meet with Te Tai Tokerau voters concerned about Kapa-Kingi's expulsion. The party had declined to participate in the meeting on the grounds that several Rangatira (chiefs) had advised them not to attend and that their attendance would have interfered with ongoing legal proceedings. In response, Tahere accused TPM of not valuing Te Tai Tokerau voters and disputed the party's claim that several rangatira had advised against their participation.

On 4 December 2025, Kapa-Kingi filed an interim injunction at the Wellington High Court challenging Te Pāti Māori's decision to expel her. Her legal team argued that her suspension and expulsion was conducted in a way that violated TPM's constitution and basic principles of fairness. Key arguments included that no proper disciplinary body had been constituted, that no adequate hearing or notice was provided, and that her membership cancellation lacked a fair process. The following day, Justice Paul Radich ruled in favour of part of Kapa-Kingi's application, reinstating her as a member of TPM. However, Radich declined her three other requests, which included removing Tamihere as party president, stopping the party's annual general meeting scheduled for the weekend (6-7 December), and preventing the party's national council and executive from passing further resolutions.

On 2 February 2026, Justice Radich heard arguments from Kapa-Kingi and Te Pāti Māori's lawyers regarding her expulsion from the party. Her counsel Mike Coulson KC argued that her expulsion violated the party's constitution and tikanga. The party's counsel Damon Salmon KC defended the party's expulsion process and confirmed that Kapa-Kingi had rejected an offer for the party's National Council to vote on her membership status in return for abandoning her legal action against president Tamihere. Radich reserved his decision.

On 10 March 2026 the High Court ruled in Kapa-Kingi's favour and ruled her suspension and subsequent expulsion was in fact "unlawful". Justice Paul Radich said in their ruling that resolutions to suspend Kapa-Kingi as a Te Pāti Māori member, expelling her from the party, and cancelling her membership were in breach of the party's kawa (rules and requirements), and thus were ruled unlawful. Te Pāti Māori acknowledged the court's decision and said it would uphold it.

=== Independent MP, 2026 ===
On 11 May 2026, Kapa-Kingi announced that she would start her own party called the Te Tai Tokerau Party to contest the 2026 New Zealand general election. Prior to her departure, Stuff had reported on 8 May that Kapa-Kingi and Te Pāti Māori were still not working together despite a court order reinstating her as a member of the party. She still shared an office space with fellow former TPM Member of Parliament Tākuta Ferris since the office previously allocated to her was occupied by former National cabinet minister Judith Collins. In addition, Te Pāti Māori's Te Tai Tokerau electorate committee had earlier resigned in support of Kapa-Kingi.

In June 2026, the Te Tai Tokerau Party applied for registration. In August 2026, the party's registration was approved.

During the 2026 general election held on 7 November, Kapa-Kingi contested Te Tai Tokerau. She came fourth place in the Te Tai Tokerau electorate with 4,059 votes. The electorate was retaken by Te Pāti Māori's candidate Aperahama Edwards. The Te Tai Tokerau Party received 1,168 party votes (0.04%), below the five percent threshold needed to enter Parliament.

== Views and positions ==
During the 2026 New Zealand general election, Kapa-Kingi advocated strategic voting amongst Māori voters as a means of defeating the incumbent National-led coalition government. She said that Māori rights had been under siege for the past three years, with her community facing an "onslaught of crises" in cost of living, housing, unemployment, weather events, and energy prices.

== Personal life ==
Kapa-Kingi married Korotangi Kingi, now Korotangi Kapa-Kingi. They have triplet sons and a daughter. Her son Eru Kapa-Kingi was ranked two places lower than her on the Te Pāti Māori party list in the 2023 election.
