= Equal Pay Amendment Act 2025 =

Act of Parliament in New Zealand

New Zealand Parliament
- Royal assent: 13 May 2025

Legislative history
- Introduced by: Brooke van Velden
- First reading: 6 May 2025
- Second reading: 6 May 2025
- Third reading: 6 May 2025
- Passed: 6 May 2025
- Status: Current legislation

The Equal Pay Amendment Act 2025 is a New Zealand omnibus Act of Parliament that raised the threshold for workers to prove historically undervalued work when making a pay equity claim. The bill passed under urgency on 6 May with the support of the governing National, ACT and New Zealand First parties. As a result, 33 current claims, representing thousands of workers, were dropped and have to be refiled. While Prime Minister Christopher Luxon argued that raising the pay equity threshold would save the New Zealand government billions in public spending, Labour Party leader Chris Hipkins criticised the bill for its lack of scrutiny. The Act amends the Equal Pay Act 1972, the Employment Relations Act 2000 and the Public Service Act 2020.

== Key provisions ==
The Equal Pay Amendment Act 2025 makes several amendments to the Equal Pay Act 1972. First, it redefines work predominantly performed by female employees as work that is performed by a workforce consisting of at least 70% females. Second, it raises the eligibility of pay equity claims. Third, it limits the dateline for unions and employees to raise pay equity claims to within 10 years after the date of a pay equity claim settlement. Fourth, it outlines the criteria for the merit of pay equity claims based on the characteristics of female dominated workforces.

The legislation also outlines the criteria for claims raised by individual employees, unions, union claims raised with multiple employers, opting out of multi-employer pay equity claims, and the consolidation process. The legislation also outlines the time limit for employer's decisions about pay equity claims and the criteria for whether they meet the provisions of Section 13E of the legislation. The legislation also outlines the criteria for assessing and comparing pay equity claims. The legislation also outlines the criteria for different parties including employers, employees, unions and the Employment Relations Authority to settle pay equity claims. The Equal Pay Amendment Act 2025 also amends the Employment Relations Act 2000 and the Public Service Act 2020.

== Background ==
=== Equal Pay legislation ===
In 1961, the New Zealand Parliament passed the Government Service Equal Pay Act 1961 which required government employees to be paid the same amount for the same type of work regardless of their gender. In 1972, Parliament passed the Equal Pay Act 1972, which extended the pay parity requirement to the private sector.

In 2020, Parliament unanimously passed the Sixth Labour Government's Equal Pay Amendment Act 2020, which entrenched the concept of "pay equity" into law. It required that "work requiring similar levels of skill, responsibility and effort" should be paid the same amount regardless of the workforce's gender makeup. The 2020 legislation sought to address lower wages in occupations dominated by women where the work had previously been dominated by men.

=== Sixth National Government ===
According to RNZ journalist Giles Dexter, the Sixth National Government had committed to making pay equity changes in late 2024 in order to fund the 2025 New Zealand budget. In December 2023, the Finance Minister Nicola Willis sought information from the New Zealand Treasury about the mechanics of pay equity forecasts and whether there were any large upcoming claims. In February 2024, Treasury released a report finding that previous Labour Government's pay equity changes had contributed to higher costs outcomes by discouraging agencies and funded sector employers from adopting a lower-cost bargaining approach. Treasury expressed concern that the New Zealand Cabinet was unaware of the costs until parties had reached or were near a settlement. Treasury recommended that the Cabinet bring pay equity costs back within Budget allowances.

In April 2024, Cabinet had agreed to reset pay equity funding into two centralised tagged contingencies: one for the funded sector and the other for the public sector. This framework would allow the Government to meet its legal obligations as an employer while still supporting the National-led coalition government's conservative fiscal strategy. By late 2024, Willis had decided to disestablish the funded sector contingency and divert the funding to the 2025 budget's allowance and capital allowance, deeming it too costly. The Government instead adopted a new policy of expecting service providers to manage their own claims and the associated cost pressures through the budgetary process. This saved the Government NZ$9.6 billion over the forecast period. At Treasure's advice, the Government retained the public sector contingency but slashed funding by NZ$3.2 billion. These changes contributed a total of NZ$12.8 billion to the 2025 Budget's operating and capital allowances.

According to a Radio New Zealand report published in mid March 2026, several cabinet ministers and public servants had met online on 19 March 2025 to discuss changes to the pay equity system. The meeting was attended by Minister for Workplace Relations and Safety Brooke van Velden, Finance Minister Nicola Willis, Public Service Minister Judith Collins, Health Minister Simeon Brown, Women's Minister Nicola Grigg, MBIE chief executive Carolyn Tremain, Ministry of Business, Innovation and Employment (MBIE) deputy secretary Nic Blakeley, New Zealand Treasury Secretary Iain Rennie, Treasury official Struan Little, Public Service Commissioner Sir Brian Roche, associate commissioner Arati Waldgrave and Department of the Prime Minister and Cabinet (DPMC) chief executive Ben King. During the meeting, the ministers and public servants decided to terminate all 33 claims, raised the "predominantly female" work threshold from 66% to 70%, imposed a ten year ban on workers relitigating settled claims and removed the final tier of cross-sector comparators.

Putting Cabinet's plan into action, van Velden's draft pay equality legislation discontinued 33 claims and raised the threshold for "what qualified as work that was predominantly performed by female employees." While acknowledging these changes would be contentious, she and the MBIE concluded that these changes needed to meet the Government's policy objectives of maintaining a pay equity system while changing the framework for assessing sex-based undervaluation. To prevent a surge of claims from being lodged under the Employment Relations Act 2000, the Government secretly wrote up the amendment bill before passing it into law under urgency in early May 2025. Due to its secrecy and urgency, no Regulatory Impact Statement was performed on the draft legislation.

== Legislative history ==
On 6 May 2025, the Workplace Minister van Velden announced that the Sixth National Government would raise the threshold for employees making pay equity claims, reversing the previous Labour Government's 2020 law change. This announcement affected 33 ongoing pay equity claims, which had to be stopped and refiled. That same day, the Government introduced urgent legislation into the New Zealand Parliament to raise the pay equity threshold. On 7 May, this pay equity legislation passed into law with the support of the governing National, ACT and New Zealand First parties. The opposition Labour, Green parties and Te Pāti Māori opposed the law change.

== Responses ==
=== Political responses ===
==== Support ====
While government ministers and parties supported the 2025 pay equity changes, the opposition Labour and Green parties criticised the changes as detrimental to female workers. Prime Minister Christopher Luxon said that the new pay equity legislation could save the Government billions in terms of pay equity settlements as part of the 2025 New Zealand budget. Similar sentiments were espoused by ACT leader and Associate Finance Minister David Seymour, who said that van Velden had saved New Zealand taxpayers and the government billions of dollars. Seymour also claimed that the Labour Government's pay equity changes would have entitled a clerical administrator to the same amount of compensation as a mechanical engineer.

In early May 2025, Finance Minister Willis rejected the opposition parties' claims that the Government's pay equity changes were motivated by a desire to fund the Government's budget. Following the release of the 2025 New Zealand budget, Willis estimated that the pay equity changes would save the New Zealand an estimated NZ$12.8 billion over the next four years. Meanwhile, New Zealand First leader and Deputy Prime Minister rejected opposition claims that the Government was disadvantaging working women in order to fund its 2025 budget and argued that employers needed better tax assistance to pay for high wages.

==== Opposition ====
Labour leader Chris Hipkins opposed the Government's pay equity changes, saying that "bringing the economy back into surplus should not be at the expense of women." Similarly, Greens co-leader Marama Davidson criticised the Government for "expecting women workers, and the lowest paid women workers, to bear the brunt of their tax cuts for the wealthy." Both the Labour and Green parties committed to repealing the 2025 pay equality legislation if they formed a government at the 2026 New Zealand general election. Following the release of the 2025 budget, former Labour leader David Cunliffe described the pay equity changes as a "MAGA-style override" that discriminated against female employees.

In mid-May 2025, the Labour Party's leadership apologised after the Whangaparāoa branch published and deleted a Facebook post depicting van Velden in a Nazi military uniform. The post was made in response to her role in the passage of the Pay Equality Amendment Act 2025. Van Velden described the post as a personal attack and offensive since her grandfather had experienced the Nazi occupation of the Netherlands.

=== Unions ===
On 6 May, the Public Service Association's national secretary Fleur Fitzsimons opposed the Government's new pay equality legislation, saying that the changes would make it "impossible for people in female-dominated professions to be paid fairly. That same day, the PSA confirmed that about 175,000 people already had their pay corrected, and that the 33 affected claims covered at least 150,000 workers across education, health, tertiary education, local government and public service sectors.

On 29 August 2025, five unions (the New Zealand Nurses Organisation, the Tertiary Education Union, the New Zealand Educational Institute, Post Primary Teachers' Association, and Public Service Association) filed a legal challenge at the High Court of New Zealand against the Government's pay equity changes. The plaintiffs argued that dropping the 33 existing claims and the new pay equality criteria breached the New Zealand Bill of Rights Act 1990.

=== Academia and media ===
On 11 May 2025, Stuff editor and journalist Andrea Vance criticised several female government Members of Parliament (MPs) including Willis, van Velden, Judith Collins, Erica Stanford, Louise Upston and Nicola Grigg for their role in the passage of the Equal Pay Amendment Act 2025, comparing the pay equity changes to former Finance Minister Ruth Richardson's "Ruthanasia" economic reforms. In her Sunday Star Times column, Vance accused the six MPs of "shafting the underpaid women doing vital, feminised labour that keeps the country functioning." On 14 May, van Velden described Vance's column as misogynistic during a Parliamentary debate and also quoted a passage from the column mentioning the word "cunt." In response, New Zealand First leader Winston Peters criticised van Velden for using what he regarded as inappropriate language while ACT leader David Seymour defended van Velden's parliamentary conduct. Speaker Gerry Brownlee advised MPs on their use of language in Parliament. Stuff Masthead Publishing managing director Joanna Norris defended Vance's column for contributing to the public debate around the pay equality legislation. In response, Vance described the criticism of objectionable language in her column as a distraction from the Government's controversial pay equality legislation.

Following the release of the 2025 budget, several academic and media commentators including University of Auckland political scientists Jennifer Curtin, Gay Marie Francisco, Mohammad Salimifar, Newsroom editor Sam Sachdeva and Radio New Zealand deputy political editor Craig McCulloch said that the pay equity changes reflected the Government's priorities in using the 2025 Budget to promote economic growth, targeted economic and health spending, and giving tax breaks to businesses and frontline services. Brigitte Morten, who had previously served as Willis' campaign chair, said that the Government's pay equity changes alienated women voters.

=== People's Select Committee ===
In August 2025, several former female Members of Parliament opposed to the pay equity changes established an unofficial "People's Select Committee" to consider evidence that was not obtained by the Government during the passage of the Equal Pay Amendment Act. Former legislators involved in the People's Select Committee included former National MPs Marilyn Waring, Jackie Blue, Jo Hayes and Belinda Vernon, Labour MPs Nanaia Mahuta, Lianne Dalziel, Steve Chadwick and Lynne Pillay, NZ First MP Ria Bond and Green MP Sue Bradford. In response to the People's Select Committee, Workplace Minister van Velden defended the Government's pay equality legislation and said the Committee was not part of formal parliamentary process. On 24 February 2026, the committee released its report, which described the passage of the Equal Pay Amendment Act 2025 as a "flagrant and significant abuse of power." The committee disputed the Government's claim that the previous pay equity scheme was unworkable and praised the former programme as "world leading" and "full of checks and balances." In response to criticism, Van Velden described the new scheme as "simple and robust" and said it focused solely on sex-based discrimination.

=== United Nations investigation ===
On 6 May 2026 the Pay Equity Coalition Aotearoa, a coalition of 20 groups, filed a complaint with the United Nations. They asked the UN to investigate whether the New Zealand government's amendments to pay equity amounted to systemic discrimination against women.

=== 2026 High Court ruling ===
On 19 November 2026, High Court Justice Paul Radich ruled that the New Zealand Government breached women's rights when it scrapped several pay equity claims through the passage of the Equal Pay Amendment Act in 2025. However, the Court rejected arguments by several unions that the Government had breached their rights without consulting them. The Public Service Association welcomed the ruling and urged the New Zealand Government to restore the previous pay equity regime.
