= 2024 New Zealand budget =

Government budget for fiscal year 2024/25

- Submitted by: Nicola Willis
- Presented: 30 May 2024
- Country: New Zealand
- Parliament: 54th
- Party: National
- Website: https://budget.govt.nz/

Budget 2024 is the New Zealand budget for fiscal year 2024/25 presented to the House of Representatives by Minister of Finance, Nicola Willis, on 30 May 2024 as the first budget presented by the Sixth National Government, ignoring the mini-budget they presented in December 2023.

== Background ==
On 20 December 2023, Minister of Finance Nicola Willis had released a mini-budget as part of the Sixth National Government's plan to address the cost of living, deliver income tax relief, and reduce the tax burden. The Government's mini-budget had delivered NZ$7.47 billion in operational savings by repealing or stopping 15 programmes launched by the previous Labour Government including 20 hours of free child care for two-year olds, eliminating depreciation for commercial buildings and dissolving the Climate Emergency Response Fund. Following the release of the mini-budget, the Government confirmed that it would announce its budget policy statement and allowances for the 2024 budget in March 2024.

== Major announcements ==
=== Defence, justice, police and corrections ===
- $226.1m over four years for an extra 500 police.
- $424.9m over four years to support frontline policing ($242.2m for police pay and $62.7m for vehicles and maritime capability).
- $78m over three years to extend rehabilitation programmes to remand prisoners.
- $812.8m over five years for Corrections to respond to the increase in prisoners numbers.
- Savings of $43.4m over four years from increasing court filing, enforcement and fine collection fees.

Announced before the Budget:

- $571m for Defence.
- Corrections prison bed boost.

=== Education ===
- $1.48b over four years for school and kura kaupapa property.
- $199.5m over four years for school operating grants.
- $191m over four years for early childhood education subsidies.
- $163m over four years to maintain school IT infrastructure.
- $256m over four years to increase tertiary tuition and training subsidies to providers by 2.5%.
- Student loan interest rates for overseas borrowers to increase from 3.9% to 4.9% from 1 April 2025.

Announced before the Budget:

- $153m to set up Charter Schools.
- Structured literacy.
- $53m for teacher training and recruitment.

=== Health ===
Health NZ Te Whatu Ora is set to receive $16.68b in new funding over three Budgets:

- $3.44b over four years for Health New Zealand hospital and specialist services.
- $2.12b over four years for primary, community and public health.
- $1.77b over four years to maintain Pharmac funding.
- $1.1b over five years to address demand and cost pressures for the Whaikaha - Ministry of Disabled People.
- $31.2m over four years to extend free breast screening.
- $30.84m over four years to increase ED security.
- $22m over four years to train 25 more doctors each year.
- $9.7m over four years to set up a National Mental Health and Addiction Community Sector Innovation Fund.

Announced before the Budget:

- $24m over four years for the I Am Hope Foundation's Gumboot Friday youth counselling programme.

=== Transport ===
- $1b over four years to accelerate Roads of National Significance.
- $939.3 over four years to repair roads damaged during Cyclone Gabrielle, the Auckland floods and other North Island weather events.
- $266.9m over four years to upgrade and maintain Auckland and Wellington rail networks, including $159.2m over two years to complete Auckland's rail network rebuild.
- $200m over four years for KiwiRail national rail network maintenance and renewals.
- $10m over four years for Airways NZ to complete minimum operating network of Ground Based Navigation Aids used to safely recover aircraft.
- $44m to support Civil Aviation Authority to carry out core functions while fee, levy rates are reviewed.
- $23.1m over four years for critical frontline rescue services to respond to severe weather events and emergencies.
- Extra $1b over four years for the National Land Transport Fund.

Announced before the Budget:

- $63.6m for Surf Life Saving, Coastguard.

=== Tax and economy ===
- $2.57b on tax cuts through bracket adjustments unchanged from what National set out in the election campaign.
- $155m on Independent Earner Tax Credit eligibility changes in line with National's election campaign.
- $182m on In-Work Working For Families Tax credit by $25 a week, in line with National's election campaign (the change to abatement thresholds was abandoned during coalition negotiations).
- $729m on restoring interest deductibility for residential rental property.
- $45m on adjusting the brightline test.

Announced before the Budget:

- $723m over four years for $75 a week childcare subsidies.

==== Saving and new funding ====
Note that the climate funding and closure of Labour programmes includes savings found in the mini-Budget in December.

- $1.215b in total baseline savings from government departments and agencies not reprioritised.
- $775m on closing previous programmes.
- $597m of funding from the Climate Emergency Response Fund paid for through the ETS.
- $578m from commercial buildings depreciation.
- $1.195b over four years from expanding the Waste Disposal Levy to cover a wider range of projects (with half of revenue still going to local government).
- $462.8m over four years from scrapping the Wellington Science City project.
- $133m from immigration levies including $261.9m over four years from increased International Visitors levies.
- $47m from taxing online casino operators.
- $178m over four years in savings from the Energy Efficiency and Conservation Authority, including discontinuing new Warmer Kiwi Homes subsidies or hot water heaters, energy-efficiency measures, an LED lighting scheme, and community-focused outreach for hard-to-reach households.
- $220m from switching fees-free from first year to final year of university.
- $147m from tax evasion crackdown.
- $116.1m over four years from reinstating the $5 prescription fee for ages 14-64, made up of $269m over four years in total savings and $153.5m over four years due to increased uptake from the policy.
- $164.5m over four years returned from contingency funding for pricing an agricultural emissions scheme.
- $5.55m over four years less spent on New Zealand Film Commission, New Zealand Symphony Orchestra, and Ngā Taonga Sound & Vision.
- $5.72m over four years from scrapping the Consumer Advocacy Council, and $38.27m over four years from scaling down other energy programmes like the Community Renewable Energy Fund.
- $300,000 for scrapping the Circular Economy and Biosecurity Strategy.

Announced before the Budget:

- Revised Free School Lunches, now costing $477.55 from 2024 to 2027.

=== Other ===
- $48.7m over three years from 2025/26 for Te Matatini.
- $1.2b for a Regional Infrastructure Fund, including $200m for flood infrastructure upgrades.
- $5m for the creation of the National Infrastructure Funding and Financing.
- $106.9m over four years operational funding for GeoNet and the National Seismic Hazard Model.
- $92.2m for National's replacement for the RMA reforms.

Announced before the Budget:

- First Home Grants scrapped, 1500 new social housing places.

== Responses ==
=== Government ===
Prime Minister and National Party leader Christopher Luxon praised Finance Minister Nicola Willis for delivering a "brilliant budget" and stated that the Government was "rebuilding the economy so we can get rid of inflation and reduce the cost of living" and delivering personal income tax relief to working New Zealanders.

Similarly, Deputy Prime Minister and New Zealand First leader Winston Peters said New Zealand had changed gears from "reverse and backwards to forwards and progress with the Budget." Coalition partner and ACT Party leader David Seymour also praised the 2024 budget, stating that the tax cuts amounted to "taking less of people's money in the first place" and stated that tax deductibility for landlords would lower rents, which would help tenants purchase their own homes.

The Government was unable to deliver on its 2023 election promise to fund 13 new cancer treatment drugs, which it blamed on a NZ$1.77 billion funding "cliff" in Pharmac's budget left by the previous Labour Government. On 24 June, Health Minister Shane Reti confirmed that the Government would be investing NZ$604 million over the next four years in boosting Pharmac funding for 54 new medicines including 26 cancer treatments. He reiterated that this funding would allow the Government to fulfill its election promise of funding 13 cancer drugs.

=== Opposition ===
==== Labour ====
The Labour Party's leader Chris Hipkins said that the 2024 Budget would "take New Zealanders backward" and that the Budget "is not worth the paper it is printed on." He criticised the Budget for making cuts to healthcare, public transportation, the first home grant, public services and climate change mitigation. While Hipkins criticised the amount of tax cuts people would be getting and emails sent to supports stating it as "just a few dollars", Labours general secretary asked supporters to donate their tax cuts to them. Labour MP Willie Jackson criticised the cuts to Māori housing providers, rangatahi (youth) transitional housing and other Māori development initiatives.

==== Green ====
Green Party co-leaders Chlöe Swarbrick and Marama Davidson were critical of the budget. Swarbrick said that the Government had chosen to "slash and burn funding for climate action and punch down on people who need support" while Davidson called it a "mean and nasty Budget" that would worsen poverty and ignored the climate crisis. Davidson also described budgetary funding for Te Matatini as a "sugar hit" in a budget that was "unambitious for Māori." She also described the Government's tax cuts as "crumbs" compared to the "slash and burn" cuts to public services.

==== Te Pāti Māori ====
The opposition Te Pāti Māori (Māori Party) and others connected to the Toitū Te Tiriti (Honour the Treaty) movement called for a nationwide day of strike to protest the National-led coalition government's policies that were affecting Māori ahead of the 2024 Budget's release. Thousands turned out for protests across New Zealand. Te Pāti Māori chose not to attend the budget, with co-leader Debbie Ngarewa-Packer stating "Why would anybody be wanting to turn up to celebrate a budget that represents the cuts that they have ruthlessly made against Maori." Following the budget's release, Ngarewa-Packer described it as a "privileged budget" where Māori did not exist. She and co-leader Rawiri Waititi issued a joint statement calling for the establishment of a Māori parliament.

=== Local government ===
Local Government New Zealand (LGNZ), the representative body for local and regional councils, gave a mixed response to the 2024 budget. While the body expressed disappointment with the Central Government's lack of commitment to sharing Goods and Services Tax on new building projects with local governments to cover the cost of growth. LGNZ however welcomed the Budget's housing growth incentives, which LGNZ said it was willing to work with the Government on.

=== State-owned enterprises ===
KiwiRail CEO Peter Reidy welcomed the Government's decision to allocate NZ$159 million to all stages of the Auckland rail network reconstruction, saying that we "fully appreciate the Government's need to manage spending and are thankful for this healthy investment in rail - which will be going where it is most needed".

=== Civil society ===
The Public Service Association's National Secretary Duane Leo criticised the Budget, stating: "The Government has made a choice that tax cuts for landlords and higher income earners are more of a priority than the quality public services which underpin a thriving economy and support the health and wellbeing of New Zealanders."

First Union New Zealand's General Secretary Dennis Maga described the Budget as a "brain drain" budget and said that "irresponsible and ideological personal tax cuts would do nothing to mitigate the cost of living crisis and were being paid for by the dismantling of the public service." He also criticised the Government for failing to prioritise the long-term health of emergency services.

Māori housing advocacy group Te Matapihi's acting chair Rau Hoskins criticised cuts to several housing initiatives including a NZ$1 billion cut for Kāinga Ora, NZ$174.5 million from the Emergency Housing Review and Homelessness Action Plan, NZ$40 million from Māori housing supply and investments, and NZ$20 million from emergency housing. Meanwhile, Te Matapihi chair Ali Hamlin-Paenga called on the Government to give clarity on housing projects that had been paused due to uncertainty over policy and funding.

The Human Rights Commission tatau urutahi (shared leader) Julia Whaipooti said the 2024 Budget did not reflect the needs of Māori. She criticised the Government's decision to prioritise funding for boosting Police numbers and expanding Waikeria Prison over housing and jobs creation.

Victoria University of Wellington Professor Joanna Kidman and Federation of Islamic Associations of New Zealand spokesperson Abdur Razzaq criticised the Government's decision to reduce the He Whenua Taurikura National Centre of Research Excellence into terrorism and violent extremism's budget allocation from NZ$1.325 million a year to NZ$500,000 amounting to NZ$3.3 million over the next four years. Kidman said that the budget cuts would affect the Centre's research and operations while Razzaq described the cuts as "short-sighted."

=== Media ===
1News political editor Maiki Sherman observed that average income households benefitted from the Government's tax cuts, paying NZ$102 a fortnight less in tax. By contrast, minimum wage workers and superannuants benefitted less, with the latter paying NZ$9 a fortnight less in tax. This is due to the average incomes of minimum wage workers and superannuants being less than average income households and as a result, low-income households are often not in high marginal tax brackets which average households are, therefore resulting in their taxes not being able to be reduced if a low-income household currently does not pay it.
