= Ministerial Economic Security and Supply Chains Group =

Ministerial oversight body overview
- Formed: 9 March 2026
- Jurisdiction: New Zealand
- Headquarters: Wellington, New Zealand
- Minister responsible: Nicola Willis, Minister of Finance
- Parent Ministerial oversight body: New Zealand Government

The Ministerial Economic Security and Supply Chains Group is a New Zealand Government oversight body established in March 2026 to coordinate cross-agency responses to threats to economic security and critical energy supply chains arising due to the 2026 Iran war. It is chaired by the Minister of Finance and brings together senior ministers and officials responsible for energy, transport, trade and economic policy.

== Focus ==
The group's core focus is ensuring the resilience of fuel imports, particularly petrol, diesel and jet fuel, and other essential goods amid global market disruption.

== Background ==
In early 2026, attacks on oil infrastructure and shipping in the Strait of Hormuz through which a substantial share of the world's crude oil and liquefied natural gas transits drove crude oil prices above US$100 per barrel and raised concerns about potential shortages in energy and other essential imports.

=== Establishment and mandate ===
In response, the New Zealand Government established the group in March 2026. Senior ministers and officials were briefed on international developments, including coordinated emergency oil reserve releases by the International Energy Agency, and tasked with assessing New Zealand's exposure to supply shocks. The group's mandate covers strategic oversight of supply chain resilience, evaluation of current supply conditions, and whole-of-government planning for potential market volatility.
