= Maiki Sherman =

New Zealand political journalist (born 1987 or 1988)

- Sherman in 2024
- Born: 1987 or 1988 (age 38–39); Auckland, New Zealand
- Education: Waiariki Institute of Technology
- Partner: Anaru MacDougall

Maiki Sherman (born 1987 or 1988) is a New Zealand journalist and television broadcaster. She has worked as a reporter for TVNZ's Māori language current affairs programme Te Karere, Whakaata Māori (Māori Television), Newshub and 1News. Between 2024 and 2026, Sherman also served as TVNZ's political editor. In May 2026, Sherman resigned as TVNZ's political editor following a five-day suspension from the New Zealand Parliament for breaching parliamentary press gallery rules and media coverage of a spat in May 2025 between her and Stuff journalist Lloyd Burr. In August 2026, Sherman joined the Māori public broadcasting service Whakaata Māori.

== Early life and education ==
Maiki Sherman is the daughter of Allan Sherman and Te Otaota Eve (Kate). She is of Māori descent and belongs to the Ngāpuhi and the Whakatōhea iwi. Sherman also has family ties to Te Arawa and Ngāi Tūhoe. Maiki is named after Maiki Hill, more commonly known as Flagstaff Hill in Russell, which was the site of where Māori leader Hōne Heke had cut down the British flagpole four times. She has an older sister, a brother, and a younger sister.

Sherman was born in 1987 or 1988 in Auckland and lived in Ōtara. From the age of one, she attended the Kōkiri Te Rahuitanga Kōhanga Reo, a Māori language immersion school, with her brother. Her family later relocated to Rotorua so that the children could attend a Māori immersion school called Te Koutu Kōhanga Reo. While attending school, Sherman once attended a protest at Tarawera River to protest against pollution by Fletcher Building. Inspired by Whakaata Māori (Māori Television), Sherman studied journalism at Waiariki Institute of Technology, earning a diploma in journalism.

== Career ==
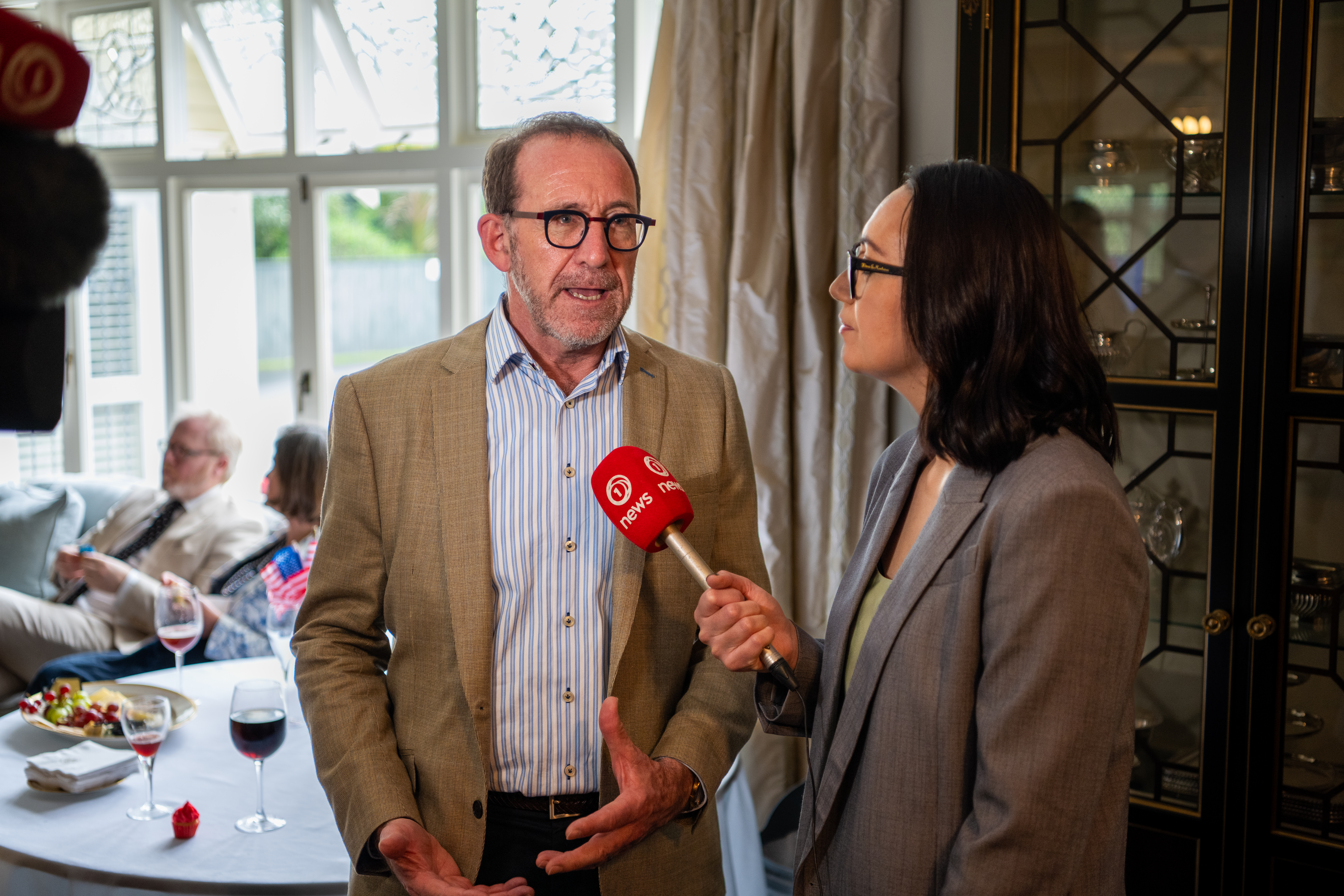
Maiki Sherman interviewing Andrew Little in November 2024.

In 2008, Sherman became a journalist on the TVNZ Māori language current affairs show Te Karere. In 2012, she joined the New Zealand Parliament's press gallery and served as a political journalist for several broadcasters including Whakaata Māori, Newshub and TVNZ's 1News. In 2016, Sherman was awarded Massey University's Māori Journalist of the Year award.

=== TVNZ political editor, 2024–2026 ===
In late March 2024, Sherman was appointed as TVNZ's political editor, becoming the first Māori woman to hold that role.

In early April 2026, The New Zealand Herald editor Shayne Currie reported that Sherman had contacted Police Minister Mark Mitchell to placate the New Zealand Government over a critical report by fellow TVNZ political journalist Benedict Collins about rising gang membership in late February 2026. This report overshadowed a Government announcement that same day that that the number of victims of violent crime and serious youth repeat offending had declined by 49,000 and 22 percent respectively. In response, left-wing blogger Martyn Bradbury called on Sherman to resign for alleged professional misconduct and undermining press freedom.

On 24 April 2026, the National Party's campaign chair Simeon Brown filed a complaint against TVNZ after Sherman and several TVNZ reporters pursued Member of Parliament and chief whip Stuart Smith through Parliament's corridors on 21 April while seeking to interview Smith over media reports he had sought a meeting with Prime Minister Christopher Luxon over declining support within the party caucus for his leadership. On 30 April, the Speaker of the New Zealand House of Representatives Gerry Brownlee suspended Sherman from Parliament for five days over her role in pursuing Smith.

On 28 April 2026, former National Party press secretary and political commentator Ani O'Brien released a Substack article alleging that Sherman had directed a homophobic slur against Stuff journalist Lloyd Burr during a late-night drinks function at the parliamentary office of Finance Minister Nicola Willis on 13 May 2025, shortly before the release of the 2025 New Zealand budget. Willis heard the confrontation and ended the drinks function. This story was subsequently picked up by several New Zealand media outlets including The New Zealand Herald, The Post and Radio New Zealand. Burr chose not to pursue the matter further. Stuff later issued a statement supporting Burr's version of the events at the May 2025 function.

Following media coverage, Willis issued a statement confirming the events of 13 May 2025 while TVNZ declined to comment on "employment matters." On 29 April 2026, Newstalk ZB broadcaster Mike Hosking confirmed that his producer Sam Carran had been working on a story about the Sherman-Burr spat last year. When he sought comment from TVNZ, the public broadcaster threatened to sue Newstalk ZB if they published a story about the matter.

On 8 May 2026, Sherman resigned from TVNZ, citing the "unprecedented level of scrutiny" on her over the past week. She also issued a statement apologising for her conduct towards Burr at the after-hour function at Willis' parliamentary office. Following media coverage, O'Brien denied that her Substack article about the Sherman-Burr spat was part of a "political hit" against TVNZ by the National Party following Brown's complaint against the public broadcaster and Luxon's decision in late April 2026 to withdraw from TVNZ's Breakfast current affairs programme. Former One News political editor Mark Sainsbury and former Newshub political editor Paddy Gower criticised TVNZ for not standing by Sherman while former 3 News political editor Stephen Parker emphasised the importance of transparency to the news media. Left-wing blogger Bradbury contended that the targeting of Sherman was part of the National Party's alleged campaign to undermine TVNZ to privatise the public broadcaster. Similarly, Gower and Radio New Zealand journalist Lilian Hanly suggested that the "outing" of Sherman was part of the National-led coalition government's conflict with the New Zealand news media.

At the 2026 NZ Media Awards, two weeks after her resignation, Sherman won the award for Political Journalist of the Year.

=== Whakaata Māori, 2026–present ===
In mid-August 2026, Sherman joined the Māori public broadcasting service Whakaata Māori as a journalist during the lead-up to the 2026 New Zealand general election.

== Personal life ==
Maiki Sherman's partner is Anaru MacDougall. They have six children and reside in Wellington. As of June 2023, Sherman was pursuing a Bachelor of Mātauranga Māori (Māori Knowledge).
