= Paul Foster-Bell =

New Zealand politician (born 1977)

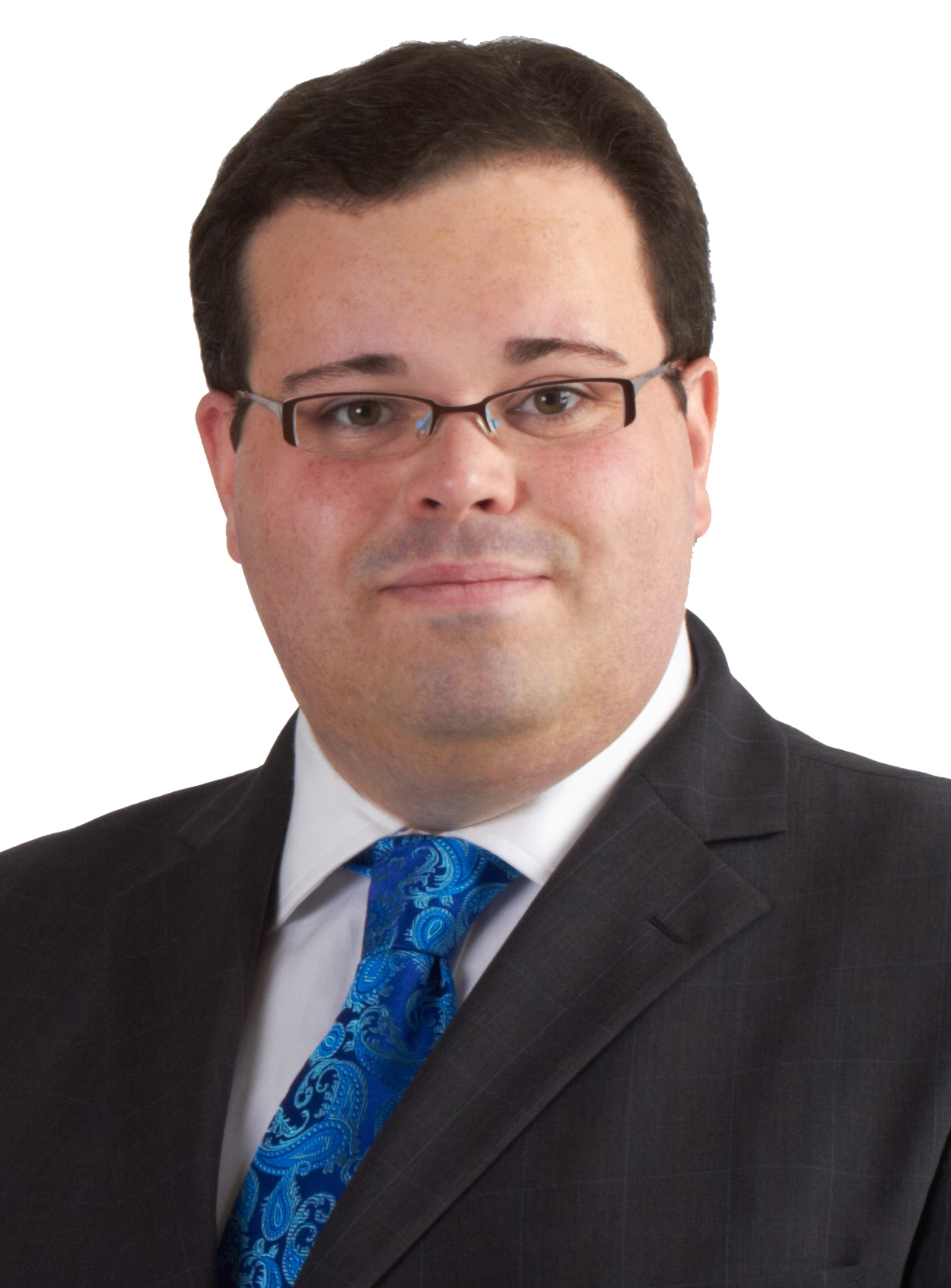
- Foster-Bell in 2011

Member of the New Zealand Parliament for National party list
- In office 21 May 2013 – 23 September 2017
- Preceded by: Jackie Blue (Note: Normally, list MPs do not have individual predecessors or successors, but Blue resigned during a sitting parliament and therefore was succeeded by Foster-Bell.)

Personal details
- Born: March 1977 (age 49) Whangārei, New Zealand
- Party: National Party
- Education: University of Otago
- Occupation: Diplomat
- Website: Profile on Parliament website

Paul Ayers Robert Foster-Bell (born March 1977) is a former New Zealand diplomat and politician. He was a National Party Member of Parliament from 2013 to 2017.

== Early life and education ==
Foster-Bell was born in Whangārei in 1977 and grew up on a beef farm in the Portland area. His parents are Bob and Alyse Foster-Bell. He is of English, Scots, Irish, Portuguese and Māori descent, with whakapapa ties to the tribes of Ngāti Kahu ki Whangaroa and Te Aupōuri.

He attended Otaika Primary School, Raumanga Intermediate and Whangarei Boys' High School, moving to Dunedin to study at the University of Otago. He was a member of the Young Nationals and unsuccessfully stood for Parliament as an undergraduate before completing his Bachelor of Arts in archaeology in 2003. Later he earned a graduate diploma in business (2008) and a Master of International Studies with Distinction (2023).

== Diplomatic career ==
Foster-Bell worked for ten years as a diplomat with the Ministry of Foreign Affairs and Trade. His overseas postings included appointments as New Zealand's deputy high commissioner to Pakistan, first secretary and consul to Iran, and deputy head of mission to Saudia Arabia. In Wellington, his posts included management roles in the ministry's Middle East and Africa division. While serving as a diplomat he took leave to unsuccessfully contest the 2011 general election.

Foster-Bell was vice-chair of Monarchy New Zealand in 2012–13.

== Member of Parliament ==
New Zealand Parliament
Years	Term	Electorate	List	Party
2013–2014	50th	List	56	National
2014–2017	51st	List	46	National

Under the name Paul Foster, Foster-Bell contested Dunedin South at the 2002 general election, losing to Labour Party incumbent David Benson-Pope. He was ranked 56 on the National Party list, too low to be elected as a list MP.

In the 2011 general election he stood in the Wellington Central electorate and lost to Labour incumbent Grant Robertson. Foster-Bell was not initially elected as a list MP, but was called to Parliament in May 2013 to replace Jackie Blue who retired. He was sworn in on 28 May 2013 and gave his maiden statement, quoting Margaret Thatcher, Jenny Shipley and Winston Churchill, on 12 June. In his first term, he was a member of the health committee and the justice and electoral committee; at the end of the term he became the latter's deputy chair.

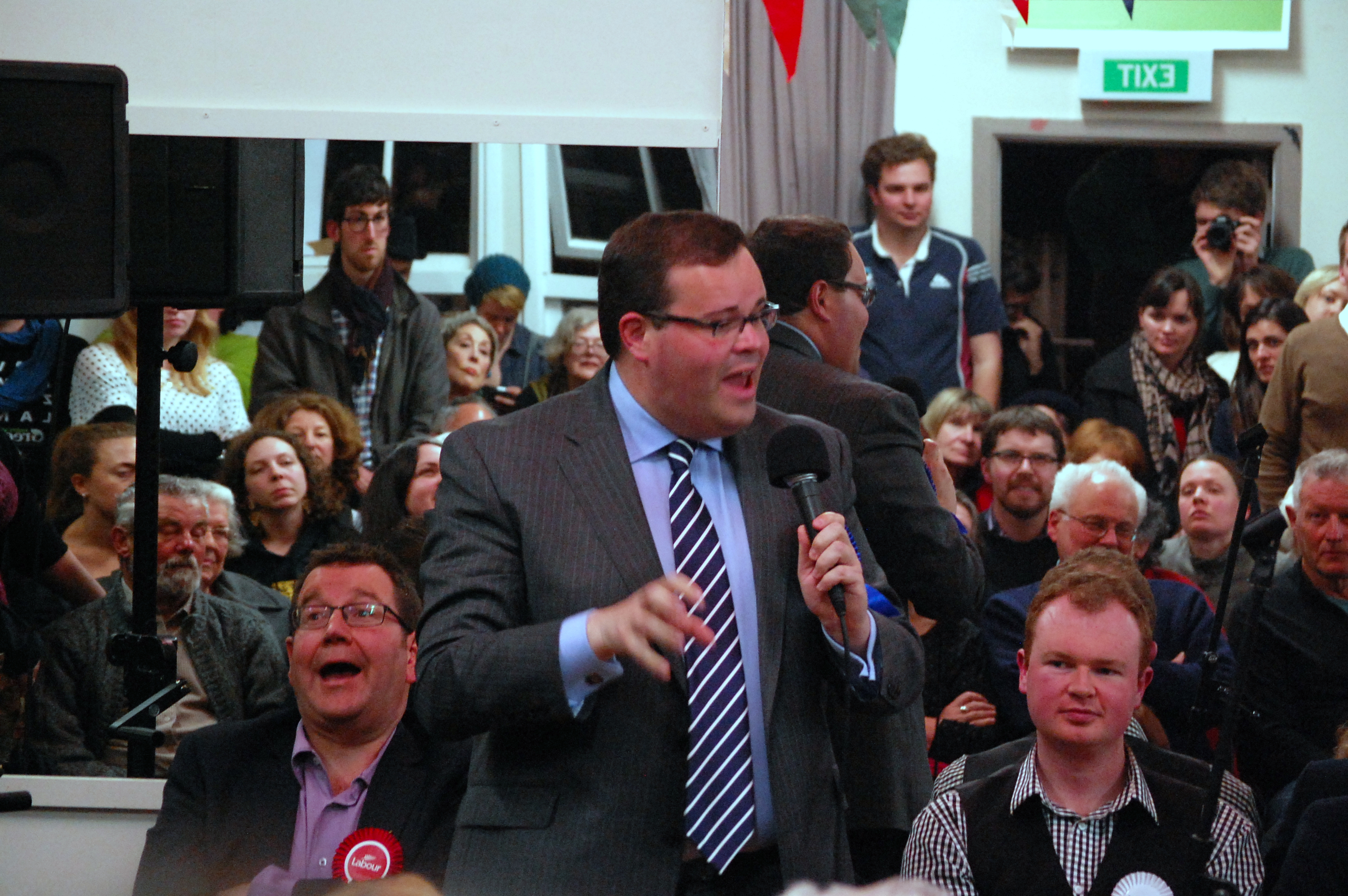
Foster-Bell speaking at the 2014 Aro Valley candidates meeting before the election

Foster-Bell sought the National Party nomination in the Whangarei electorate for the 2014 general election, but was beaten by new candidate Shane Reti. Instead, he stood again in Wellington Central, losing again to Robertson and being returned as a list MP. In his second term, he was deputy chair of the education and science committee, later of the government administration committee, and also sat on the local government and environment committee.

In 2015 Foster-Bell joined a cross-party group initiated by Green MP Jan Logie to look at and advocate for LGBTI rights. In 2016 Foster-Bell announced that he was gay in response to remarks made by Destiny Church leader Brian Tamaki regarding homosexuals.

A member's bill in Foster-Bell's name passed unanimously in April 2016, exempting Royal New Zealand Returned and Services' Association (RSA) veterans' clubs from limitations in the Sale and Supply of Alcohol Act 2012 so they could lawfully serve traditional tots of liquor at gunfire breakfasts on Anzac Day. A second bill, the Arbitration Amendment Bill, was selected for introduction in March 2017 and completed its first reading that May. This bill aimed to change New Zealand's arbitration regime to "conform more closely to international standards" drawn in the member's bill ballot. It eventually passed its third reading under the stewardship of Andrew Bayly in May 2019.

Foster-Bell courted controversy in 2016 which eventually led to his retirement from politics. In June, news broke that he had 12 staff leave his office in the 2013–2016 period, amidst claims by former staffers that he had bullied them. Foster-Bell strongly denied these allegations, saying that he was not a bully. Later that month his travel expenses, totalling more than $61,000 for a one-year period. He was defended by prime minister John Key who said that Foster-Bell's expenses had incurred from travels around the country presenting on foreign affairs and occasionally filling in for ministers. A former Key staffer and Fonterra executive, Nicola Willis, challenged Foster-Bell for the National Party's nomination in Wellington Central. Foster-Bell withdrew from candidate selection in February 2017, enabling Willis to win the nomination unopposed and announcing his retirement from politics at the 2017 general election. He made his final speech in the House on 16 August 2017.

== Later career ==
After leaving Parliament, Foster-Bell was political advisor to the Ambassador of the United States to New Zealand, Scott P. Brown.

As of 2025, Foster-Bell is a business development manager for culture, society and economy at the University of Otago. He is chair of the trust board for educational charity Shakespeare Globe Centre NZ, in which capacity he heavily criticised the government arts funder Creative New Zealand in September 2022 for de-funding Shakespeare programmes for school-aged students.
