= 2025 New Zealand budget =

Government budget for fiscal year 2025/26

- Submitted by: Nicola Willis
- Presented: 22 May 2025
- Country: New Zealand
- Parliament: 54th
- Party: National
- Website: https://budget.govt.nz/

Budget 2025 (Māori: Tahua 2025) is the New Zealand budget for fiscal year 2025/26 presented to the New Zealand House of Representatives by Finance Minister Nicola Willis, on 22 May 2025. This is the second budget passed by the Sixth National Government; they subtitled it "The Growth Budget".

== Background ==
In late April 2025, Finance Minister Nicola Willis announced that the Sixth National Government would reduce its operating budget from NZ$2.4 billion to NZ$1.3 billion. She confirmed that the 2025 Budget would focus on health, education, law and order, defence, with some limited spending on critical "social investments," supporting business growth and targeted cost of living relief.

On 6 May 2025, Minister for Workplace Relations Brooke van Velden announced that the New Zealand Government would raise the threshold for employees making pay equity claims, reversing a 2020 law change introduced by the previous Sixth Labour Government. This announcement affected 33 ongoing pay equity claims, which had to be stopped and refiled. That same day, the Government introduced urgent legislation to raise the pay equity threshold. On 7 May, the Equal Pay Amendment Act 2025 passed into law with the support of the governing National, ACT and New Zealand First parties. The opposition Labour, Green parties and Te Pāti Māori opposed the law change.

Willis estimated that the pay equity changes would save the New Zealand an estimated NZ$12.8 billion over the next four years. Several academic and media commentators including University of Auckland political scientists Jennifer Curtin, Gay Marie Francisco, Mohammad Salimifar, Newsroom editor Sam Sachdeva and Radio New Zealand deputy political editor Craig McCulloch said that the pay equity changes reflected the Government's priorities in using the 2025 Budget to promote economic growth, targeted economic and health spending, and giving tax breaks to businesses and frontline services. Brigitte Morten, who had previously served as Willis' campaign chair, said that the Government's pay equity changes alienated women voters. Meanwhile, former Labour leader David Cunliffe described the pay equity changes as a "MAGA-style override" that discriminated against female employees.

On 20 May, the government coalition parties successfully passed National MP Chris Bishop's motion that the New Zealand Parliament postpone a debate on the Privileges Committee's decision to suspend three Te Pāti Māori MPs Rawiri Waititi, Debbie Ngarewa-Packer and Hana-Rawhiti Maipi-Clarke until 5 June, allowing them to participate in the parliamentary debate on the 2025 budget scheduled for 22 May.

== Major announcements ==
The core New Zealand Crown expense forecast for the 2025-26 financial year is NZ$ 150.3 billion. Of this figure, NZ$3.7 billion has been allocated to health, NZ$24.7 billion to superannuation, NZ$21.5 billion to education, NZ$25.5 billion to social security and welfare, NZ$9.5 billion to financial costs, NZ$7.3 billion to law and order and NZ$7.2 billion to transportation and communications. The Government allocated NZ$6.8 billion in capital expenditure to maintaining or upgrading assets, predominantly in health, education, defence and transportation.

=== Investment Boost ===
- The Investment Boost policy allows businesses to deduct 20 percent of the costs of new assets like machinery, tools and equipment from taxable income on top of normal depreciation. Willis has estimated that this tax break will lift gross domestic product by 1 percent and wages by 1.5 percent over the next 20 years.
- The Government will also seek to promote economic growth by attracting foreign investment through the investment agency Invest New Zealand, changing international tax rules to encourage infrastructural investment, changing employee share scheme tax rates and investing international visitor fees into tourism and conservation upgrades.
- Replacing the Resource Management Act 1991 with new legislation encouraging investment and economic growth.

=== Health ===
- Injecting NZ$5.5 billion worth of investment into hospital and specialist services, primary care, and community and public health.
- Investing NZ$447 million in expanding access to urgent care and after-hours services across New Zealand. Of this amount, NZ$164 million will be allocated to expanding urgent and after-hours healthcare services in Dunedin, Counties Manukau, Whangārei, Palmerston North and Tauranga over the next four years.
- Allocating NZ$1 billion to redeveloping Nelson Hospital and the Wellington Emergency Department.
- Investing NZ$1 billion into drug purchasing agency Pharmac for additional cancer treatments and other medicines. Of this amount, $604 million was allocated to covering 54 new medical treatments over the next four years.

=== Education ===
- Investing NZ$646 million to support children with additional learning needs. NZ$380 million will be allocated to additional learning support and early intervention programmes for needy students and those with "complex needs."
- Increasing schools' operating grants, early childhood and tertiary education subsidies.
- Investing NZ$15.7 million into subsidies supporting independent schools over the next four years. The annual funding for independent schools will increase by 11% from NZ$41.6 million to NZ$46.2 million over the next four years.
- Allocating NZ$100 million to helping children struggling with mathematics, including specialist teachers and tests.
- Allocating NZ$140 million to supporting services to boost school attendance.
- Disestablishing the NZ$375 million "Kahui Ako" school clustering programme and redirecting NZ$375 million worth of funding to supporting disabled learners over the next four years. These cutbacks affect several Māori providers.
- Reallocating funding to create 50 new teaching spaces for Māori language learners.

=== Law and order ===
- Investing NZ$480 million into supporting frontline policing.
- Investing NZ$246 million into improving services and victim support at courts, tribunals and the legal aid system.
- Investing NZ$14 million into Māori Wardens, Pasifika Wardens and the Māori Women's Welfare League.
- Investing NZ$35 million into combating drug smuggling, improving supply chain security and expanding the New Zealand Customs Service's overseas presence.
- Allocating NZ$33 million into funding future boot camps over the next four years. Allocating NZ$16 million to the Government's Youth Serious Offender category.
- Investing $33 million in upgrading Youth Justice Residences.
- Allocating NZ$472 million to expanding prison infrastructure, with inmate numbers projected to rise to 11,000 by mid-2026.

=== Social services ===
- Allocating NZ$774 million towards the care system and improving redress for survivors of abuse in state care and faith-based institutions.
- Investing NZ$275 million in social investment initiatives including a NZ$190 million social investment fund.
- Investing NZ$760 million into disability support services.
- Tightening Jobseeker Support and Emergency Benefits criteria for 18- and 19-year old applicants, subject to a parental assistance test. People under 20 years of age who are married, in a civil union or in a de-facto relationship will be exempt from the parental assistance test.
- The Best Start child payment scheme will become fully income tested from April 2026, with payments being cut off for families earning over NZ$97,000.

=== KiwiSaver ===
- Raising the KiwiSaver employee and employer contribution rate progressively from 3 to 4 percent between 1 April 2026 and 1 April 2028.
- The Government will extend its KiwiSaver contribution to 16 and 17-year olds from 1 July 2025, and extend employer matching to 16 and 17-year olds from 1 April 2026.
- Reducing the government KiwiSaver contribution from 50 cents to 25 cents per each dollar that a member contributes each year, falling from NZ$521 a year to NZ$260.72 by 1 July 2025.
- KiwiSaver contributors earning more than NZ$180,000 per year will no longer be eligible for Government KiwiSaver contributions from 1 July 2025.

=== Cost of living ===
- Raising the medical prescription length from three to twelve months. This policy is expected to benefit people with conditions such as diabetes, asthma and high blood pressure.
- Lifting the income threshold to enable 60,000 additional lower-income households with a SuperGold Card to receive a rates rebate. The maximum rebate was lifted from NZ$790 to NZ$805.
- Targeting Working for Families funding to focus on lower and middle income families. Increasing benefits to 144,000 families by NZ$14 per fortnight, subject to income testing.
- Covering teachers' registration and practising certificate fees for 155,000 teachers until 2028.

=== Defence ===
- Investing NZ$660 million in increasing New Zealand Defence Force capabilities.
- Allocating NZ$2 billion to purchasing new maritime helicopters for the Royal New Zealand Navy.
- Allocating funding to support overseas troop deployments including personnel involving in training Ukrainian military personnel.
- Investing money in buying two new aircraft to replace the Royal New Zealand Air Force's Boeing 757 jets.
- Allocating NZ$77 million to writing off the sunken HMNZS Manawanui (2019) for the 2024-2025 financial year. This sum included NZ$32 million for clean-up, salvage, and other remedial activities at the shipwreck site off the coast of Samoa's Upolu island.

=== Foreign affairs ===
- Investing NZ$368 million in delivering overseas development assistance, focusing on the Pacific.
- Investing NZ$84 million in boosting New Zealand’s engagement with Asia, addressing trade barriers and doubling export goals.

=== Capital investment ===
- Investing NZ$1 billion in hospitals and other health facilities.
- Investing NZ$2.7 billion in boosting the New Zealand Defence Force's capabilities.
- Establishing a new housing fund to support the rollout of social housing and affordable rentals. Māori providers will be eligible through the Flexible Fund.
- Investing NZ$700 million in renovating existing school infrastructure and building new schools.
- Investing in a private-public partnership to deliver 240 new high security beds at Christchurch Men's Prison.
- Investing NZ$461 million in upgrading and maintaining New Zealand's freight rail network.
  - Investing NZ$140 million in replacing and upgrading the metropolitan passenger rail networks in Wellington and Auckland.

=== Māori ===
- Investing NZ$40.2 million per year from 2025 into the Māori Development Fund to support the Tōnui Māori economic growth plan. The Government also reduced funding to the Fund by NZ$20 million over the next four years.
- Investing NZ$54 million in operational funding and NZ$50 million in capital funding to Māori education including new classrooms, language and cultural training for 50,000 teachers and a "Virtual Learning Network" for STEM education in kura kaupapa and Māori medium education.
- Allocating funding to recruiting seven new curriculum advisors to help teachers using the redesigned Te Marautanga o Aotearoa programme (the curriculum for Māori medium schools).
- Allocating funding to new curriculum resources for te reo matatini ("complex language") and STEM subjects for around 5,000 senior high school students.
- Allocating funding to developing a new Māori Studies subject for the English-medium high school curriculum.
- Cutting NZ$32.5 million in funding to Māori housing supply programmes including the Te Puni Kōkiri's Whai Kāinga Whai Oranga housing initiative.
- Cutting NZ$36.1 million in funding to Māori education including eliminating the Wharekura Expert Teachers programme and Māori resource teachers.
- Cutting NZ$36.1 million in funding to kaupapa Māori and Māori medium education.

=== Others ===
- Gas exploration: NZ$200 million over the next four years in Crown-private co-investment in new gas fields.
- Film industry: Allocating NZ$577 million to the New Zealand film industry.
- Media: Investing NZ$6.4 million over the next four years to hire journalists for the "Local Democracy Reporting" and "Open Justice" programmes, which focus on local government and court-related news respectively.
- Media: Reducing public broadcaster Radio New Zealand's (RNZ) budget by NZ$18 million over the next four years (roughly NZ$4.6 million per year). As a result, RNZ has sought voluntary redundancies. In early October 2025, RNZ confirmed it would close its youth podcast series TAHI, the "Sunday Sampler" and "At the Movies" radio show as a result of budget cutbacks.
- Ministry for Pacific Peoples (MPP): Cutting NZ$36 million in funding to the Ministry. Shuttered programmes including the Tauola Business Fund and the Dawn Raids reconciliation programme for the 2027/28 financial year. Allocating NZ$6.3 million per annum to MPP's Pacific Business Trust and Pacific Business Village business support programmes. Reducing the MPP's Tupu Aotearoa employment programme's annual funding to NZ$5.25 million.
- Public services: Most government departments did not receive extra funding in 2025, which means they will have to absorb any rising costs including wage increases.

== Responses ==
=== Government ===
==== National ====
On 22 May, Finance Minister Nicola Willis defended the 2025 budget, arguing it would lead to rising incomes, new jobs being created, and better funding for education, healthcare services, police and defence. During her budget speech, Willis stated that "we are not going to have to burden future generations with unmeetable levels of debt, we are not going to impose new taxes, and in fact we are going to grow the economy faster." Willis also disputed claims that the Government had diverted NZ$750 million away from targeted Māori initiatives to the general pool, stating: "This is a Budget that is good for Māori because this is a Gudget [sic] that has seen job creation, income growth, more opportunities for Māori."

On 23 May, Minister for Māori Development Tama Potaka highlighted Māori funding targets in the 2025 budget particularly the Māori Wardens and Māori Women's Welfare League. On 25 May, Reti defended cuts to the Ministry for Pacific Peoples's operating budget as necessary for stimulating "efficiency and growth," stressing that money would be reallocated to frontline services.

==== ACT ====
ACT leader David Seymour praised the 2025 budget for supporting the Government's efforts to alleviate poverty, cut government spending and investing in "things to make it easier to get along." He said that the budget's targeted investments in improving education, school attendance and helping people with special learning needs was "the real pathway out of poverty." Following the budget debate, Seymour defended the lack of targeted funding towards Māori, stating "that was opposed to any kind of raced based targeting of funding".

=== Opposition parties ===
==== Labour ====
On 22 May, Labour leader Chris Hipkins criticised the 2025 budget, saying that it did not allocate enough funding to frontline health services and criticising the Government's revamped KiwiSaver scheme for "raiding" retirement savings. He estimated that the budget would cost 18-year olds NZ$66,000 in retirement savings. Meanwhile, Labour's Māori development spokesperson Willie Jackson described the budget as "shameful" and claimed that NZ$1 billion had been stripped from Māori-specific initiatives over the past two budgets including kaupapa Māori, education, housing and economic development. Jackson also said that the National-led government's budget reversed Labour's policy of investing in Māori initiatives and programmes.

==== Green ====
During the budget debate, Green Party spokesperson for social development and employment Ricardo Menéndez March stated that Jobseeker and Emergency benefit changes for 18 and 19-year olds would cause a "growth in poverty." He also claimed that the 2025 budget fell short of the Government's child poverty reduction targets. Green MP Teanau Tuiono criticised the Government for using pay equity changes to fund the budget's tax cuts.

==== Te Pāti Māori ====
Te Pāti Māori (TPM) co-leader Debbie Ngarewa-Packer said that the Government ignored Māori in its 2025 budget. She said: "Its a Budget that is looking to build more prisons, more hospitals, and all the systems that have failed Māori." Similarly, TPM co-leader Rawiri Waititi said that the 2025 budget eroded the New Zealand Crown's relationship with tangata whenua (people of the land), stating that "this budget doesn't build a future for Māori – it builds our demise." Meanwhile, fellow TPM MP Takutai Tarsh Kemp criticised the 2025 Budget's increased defence spending in the midst of a "cost of living crisis."

=== Civil society ===
Ahead of the 2025 budget's release on 22 May, several protesters gathered outside the New Zealand Parliament to protest the Government's pay equity legislative changes.

The Public Service Association denounced the 2025 budget as the "wage theft Budget," saying that the Government had stolen NZ$12 billion from New Zealand women to pay for tax cuts for landlords.

The Retirement Commissioner Jane Wrightson welcomed the 2025 budget's changes to the KiwiSaver policy, stating that increase government payments to eligible recipients would boost retirement savings.

The environmental group Forest & Bird denounced the 2025 budget as a "disaster for our environment." The group criticised the Government's lack of funding for conservation while 75% of native species faced extinction.

Massey University Associate Māori dean and economist Professor Matt Rosskruge described the 2025 budget as a "bleak budget for Māori." While acknowledging that the Government had allocated money to some Māori programs such as the Māori Women's Welfare League, Māori Wardens and Kōhanga Reo, Rosskruge disagreed with the Government's policy of reallocating funding earmarked for Māori to the general funding pool. Similarly, Māori health leader Lady Tureiti Moxon described the 2025 Budget as a "slash and burn in all areas of Māori funding." She also criticised the diversion of funds targeted at Māori particularly in the areas of housing and healthcare.

Rāwiri Wright, the co-chair of "Te Rūnanga Nui o Ngā Kura Kaupapa Māori o Aotearoa," the national body for Kura kaupapa Māori (Māori immersion schools), regarded the NZ$50 million in capital funding allocated towards upgrading their school buildings as insufficient and a failure of the Crown to prioritise Kura kaupapa Māori interests. Te Rūnanga Nui said they needed a five-year property investment plan worth NZ$125 million to maintain their facilities.

Aaron Hendry, the co-founder of youth development organisation "Kick Back", criticised the Government's decision to allocate NZ$33 million from the 2025 budget to boot camps, which he described as "child prisons." He argued that the money could be better spent on addressing child and youth homelessness.

=== Media analysis ===
The Spinoff's contributor Liam Rātana disputed Willis' remark that the Government had generated NZ$700m in Māori funding through reallocated or pre-announced funding. Rãtana contended that budget documents showed that only NZ$38 million in new funding had been directly allocated to Māori. He also criticised the Government's decision to cut funding to the Whai Kāinga Whai Oranga Māori housing programme and various cuts to Māori education programmes.

=== Legal challenges ===
On 24 July the secondary teachers' union, the New Zealand Educational Institute (NZEI), sought a judicial review at the Wellington High Court of the New Zealand Government's decision to reduce funding for literacy and Māori resource teachers during the 2025 budget.
