= 2023 New Zealand mini-budget =

Government mini-budget for fiscal year 2023/24

- Submitted by: Nicola Willis
- Presented: 20 December 2023
- Parliament: 54th
- Party: National
- Website: Half Year Economic and Fiscal Update 2023

The 2023 New Zealand mini-budget, also known as Mini Budget 2023, was released by Minister of Finance Nicola Willis on 20 December 2023 as part of the Sixth National Government's plan to address the cost of living, deliver income tax relief, and reduce the tax burden. The Government's mini-budget delivered NZ$7.47 billion in operational savings by repealing or stopping 15 programmes launched by the previous Labour Government including 20 hours of free child care for two-year olds, eliminating depreciation for commercial buildings and dissolving the Climate Emergency Response Fund.

== Background ==
During the 2023 New Zealand general election, the National Party and its coalition partner ACT had campaigned on a platform of tax cuts and reducing what they regarded as "wasteful" spending by the outgoing Sixth Labour Government. The Finance Minister Nicola Willis had accused the outgoing Labour Government of "economic vandalism" and affirmed the new National-led coalition government's commitment to savings, repriotising government spending, and delivering income tax reduction. Similarly Associate Finance Minister David Seymour told the public not to expect "big cuts" in the mini-budget, which would serve as a prelude to the Government's 2024 New Zealand budget in May 2024. He also affirmed the Government's commitment to reducing debt and "getting the Government's books back in order." Labour finance spokesperson Grant Robertson disputed the Government's claims that his Labour Government had overspent and stated that the 2023 mini-budget showed that the National Party was "trying to cover up the fact that they didn't put enough money aside to do the basics right in Budget 2024."

== Key announcements ==
The 2023 New Zealand mini-budget generated NZ$7.5 billion worth of savings by stopping 15 programmes including 20 hours of free childcare for two-year-olds (worth NZ$1.2 billion), eliminating depreciation for commercial buildings (NZ$2.3 billion) and disestablishing the Climate Emergency Response Fund (NZ$2 billion). This is projected to generate additional revenue for the next four years.

As part of the mini-budget, Finance Minister Willis also confirmed that the Government would index main benefits to Consumer Price Index (CPI) inflation from 1 April 2024 with the goals of protecting the real incomes of welfare beneficiaries while putting the social welfare system on a more sustainable footing.

These projected savings include NZ$1.5 billion from initial baseline exercises: NZ$500 million started by the previous Labour Government, NZ$400 million in hiring fewer consultants and NZ$600 million in slashing governmental departmental costs.

In terms of fiscal cliffs, the New Zealand Treasury identified 2 time-limited programmes (estimated to be worth at least NZ$50 million over the next four years) that, if continued, would cost NZ$7.2 billion over the next four years. These affected programmes include the Healthy School Lunch Programme, International Climate Financing Future, tertiary tuition and training funding baseline pressure, the New Zealand Screen Production Rebate, Apprenticeship Boost, cyber security programmes, Kāinga Ora Operating Funding, and Pharmac's combined budget including COVID-19 therapeutics and vaccination.

The Government also confirmed that its budget policy statement and allowances for the 2024 New Zealand budget would be announced in March 2024.

== Responses ==
Labour's finance spokesperson Robertson described the 2023 mini-budget as "a litany of distractions, delays and diversions which leave the country without any certainty or coherent economic plan". He also claimed that the mini-budget lacked details about their tax cuts and how many cuts they would involve to public services. He also defended the previous Labour Government's efforts to keep public debt low and to boost economic growth by seven percent following the COVID-19 pandemic in New Zealand. Opposition Leader Chris Hipkins also described the mini-budget as a "flop" and claimed that the half-year fiscal debate had little information about how the Government planned to achieve its spending commitments.

Similarly, the Green Party's finance spokesperson James Shaw claimed that the 2023 mini-budget showed that the National Government would make life harder for people on low incomes and were "gaslighting" New Zealanders by increasing the cost of living. Shaw took issue with the Government's decision to scrap 20 hours of free early childhood education for two year olds and the Government Investment in Decarbonising Industry (GIDI) fund. Te Pāti Māori co-leader Debbie Ngarewa-Packer stated that the mini-Budget was "so mini it's non-existent for those that are really struggling". She also claimed that the budget would only benefit climate deniers and the National Party's "rich mates."

Following the mini-budget's release, Willis and Seymour defended their criticism of the previous Government's spending and reaffirmed the National Government's commitment to delivering tax relief. Willis also said that the Government was open to pursuing tax evaders via the Inland Revenue Department in order to increase tax revenue.
