= Jackie Blue =

New Zealand politician

Jackie Blue MNZM
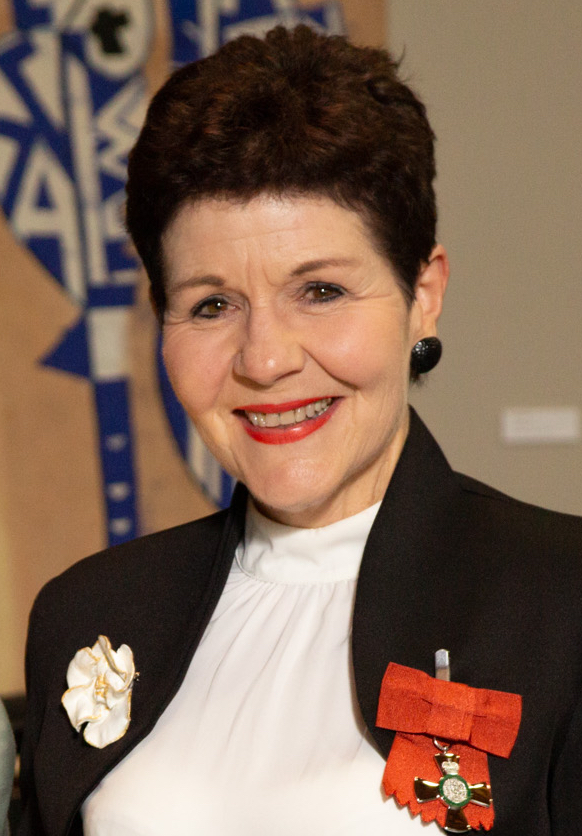
- Blue in 2019

Member of the New Zealand Parliament for National party list
- In office 17 September 2005 – 20 May 2013
- Succeeded by: Paul Foster-Bell (Note: Normally, list MPs do not have individual predecessors or successors, but Blue resigned during a sitting parliament and therefore was succeeded by Foster-Bell.)

Personal details
- Born: Jacqueline Diane Blue; 2 June 1956 (age 70) Hamilton, New Zealand
- Education: University of Auckland

Jacqueline Diane Miller MNZM (née Blue, born 2 June 1956), commonly known as Jackie Blue, is a New Zealand politician and former member of Parliament for the National Party.

== Personal life ==
Blue was born in 1956. She attended Selwyn College in Auckland, and then went on to gain a BSc from the University of Auckland in 1976 and MB ChB from Auckland Medical School in 1983. Her particular area of specialty is breast cancer, and she is a member of the Scientific Advisory Panel at the Breast Cancer Research Trust. Blue gained prominence in the medical sector as a pioneering breast physician.

Blue is married and has two children.

== Political career ==
New Zealand Parliament
Years	Term	Electorate	List	Party
2005–2008	48th	List	41	National
2008–2011	49th	List	45	National
2011–2013	50th	List	46	National

Blue's previous political involvement included service on a District Health Board as an elected member from the centre-right Citizens and Ratepayers Now organisation. She resigned from this shortly after being elected a National MP.

In the 2005 general election, Blue stood as the National Party's candidate in the Mt Roskill electorate. She was unsuccessful in winning the traditionally safe Labour seat from high-profile Labour MP Phil Goff, but entered Parliament as a list MP, having been ranked 41st on the National Party list. In her first term as an Opposition MP, Blue had responsibilities as the spokeswoman for the National Party on women's issues, as well as associate health. Subsequent to her election to Parliament, Blue strongly advocated for further available health care for sufferers of breast cancer, including wider use of the anti-cancer drug Herceptin.

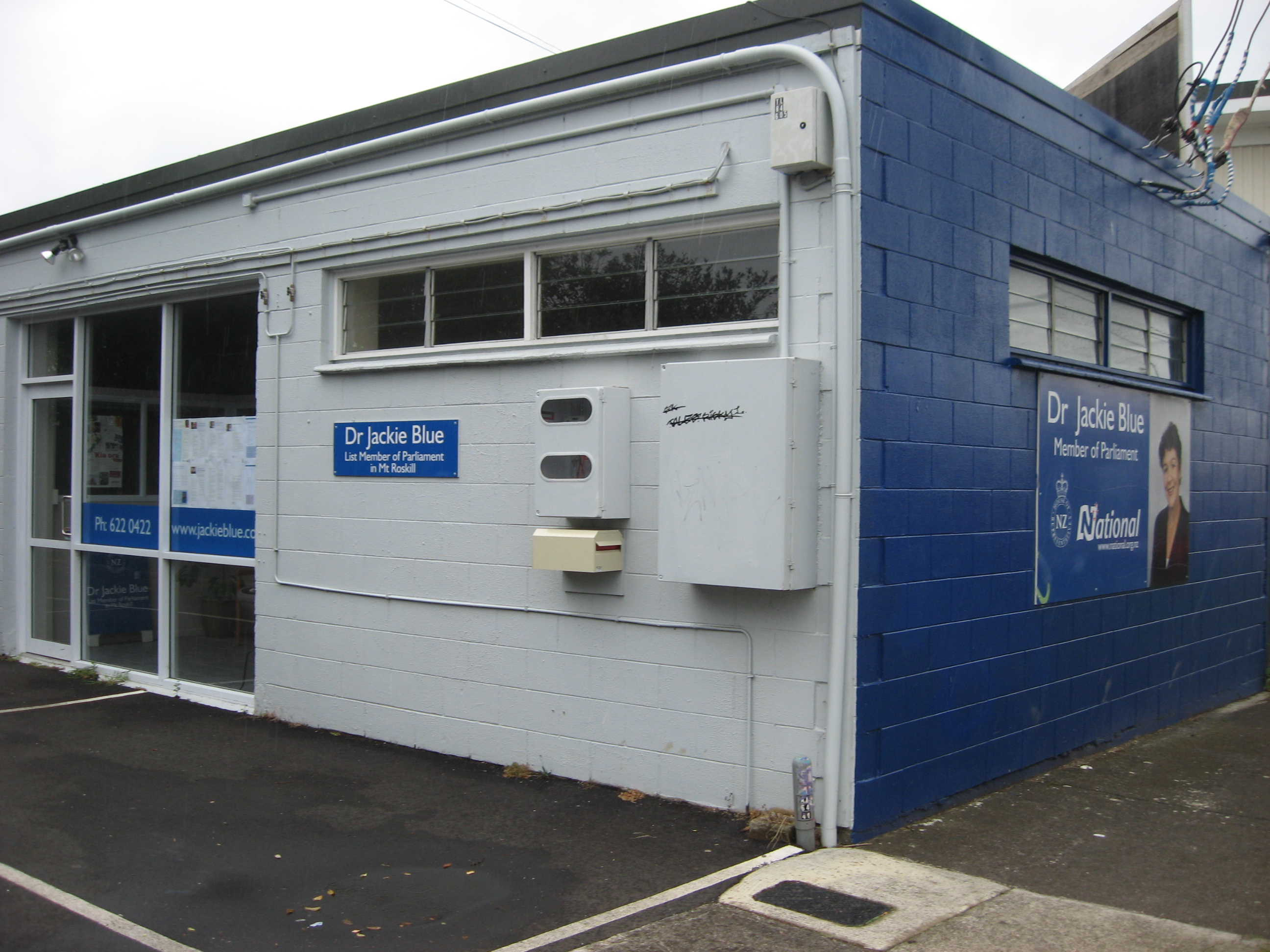
An office of Jackie Blue's near Auckland.

In 2006, Blue's Human Tissue (Organ Donation) Amendment Bill was drawn from the member's ballot. The bill passed its first reading and was sent to select committee, but was defeated at its second reading.

In 2008, Blue sought the National Party candidacy in Auckland Central electorate, where she has been a long-term resident. Blue lost the contest to the much younger Nikki Kaye who went on to win the seat. Blue was subsequently unsuccessful in standing against incumbent MP Phil Goff in Mt Roskill for a second time, but was returned to Parliament as a List MP at the 2008 election.

In May 2010 Blue's Consumer Guarantees Amendment Bill, which extends the Consumer Guarantees Act to cover online auctions, was drawn from the member's ballot. It passed its first reading and was sent to select committee in July 2010.

In November 2011, Blue stood for a third time in Mt Roskill against Goff, but was unsuccessful. She was returned to Parliament for a third time as a List MP.

== Human rights advocacy ==
Blue was appointed Equal Employment Opportunities Commissioner at the Human Rights Commission in April 2013 and took up the position in June 2013. She resigned from Parliament and was replaced by Paul Foster-Bell.

As Commissioner she urged New Zealand sporting bodies to "level the playing field" for women.

In 2018 she told a UN committee before leaving the Human Rights Commission that successive governments have failed New Zealand women over domestic violence, the number one human rights issue.

In May 2025, Blue took part in the unofficial cross-party People's Select Committee, led by Marilyn Waring, which investigated the pay equity changes by the National government.

In the 2019 Queen's Birthday Honours, Blue was appointed a Member of the New Zealand Order of Merit, for services to women and the State.

== Return to politics ==
In March 2026, Blue resigned her National Party membership, saying the Sixth National Government's handling of pay equity changes was her breaking point. She also said that she would be joining The Opportunity Party to mentor its leader Qiulae Wong.
