= Ruth Spearing =

New Zealand haematologist

Ruth Spearing CNZM
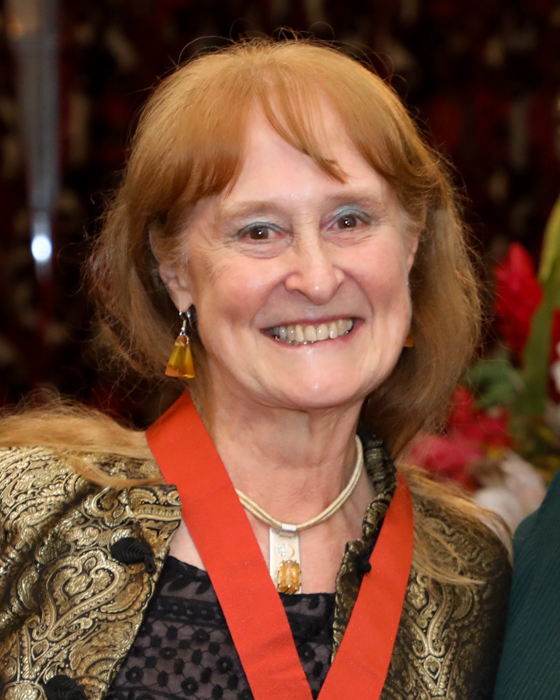
- Spearing in 2023
- Awards: Companion of the New Zealand Order of Merit

Academic background
- Education: University of Otago

Ruth Lilian Spearing CNZM is a New Zealand haematologist, and researches blood cancer. In 2023 Spearing was appointed a Companion of the New Zealand Order of Merit for services to haematology.

== Career ==
Spearing attended the University of Otago. She has worked as a consultant haematologist at Christchurch Hospital since 1989, and is the clinical director of haematology at Canterbury District Health Board. From 2003 until 2017 Spearing served as Chair of the Canterbury Hospitals’ Medical Staff Association. Spearing was also Canterbury Clinical Lead for the Adolescent and Young Adult Cancer Service. Spearing was also a board member of the New Zealand Medical Association, and a trustee of the Chronic Lymphocytic Leukaemia Advocates New Zealand.

Spearing led the New Zealand involvement in international collaborative trials with the UK's Medical Research Council and the Australasian Leukaemia and Lymphoma Group. These trials have investigated treatments for a range of blood cancers including myeloma, chronic lymphocytic leukaemia, acute lymphocytic and myeloid leukaemia, and have resulted in increased survival rates from 13% for acute myeloid leukaemia in the 1980s to 65 per cent.

In 2008, Spearing established the Ruth Spearing Cancer Research Trust, to support haematology research in the South Island.

In 2024, Spearing led calls for Pharmac chief executive Sarah Fitt to step down after an Official Information Act request revealed internal communications showing disdain for patients and their advocates. Spearing has been critical of Pharmac's approach to funding new drugs, especially drugs for blood cancers, pointing out that New Zealand funds far fewer blood cancer drugs than other countries.

== Honours and awards ==
In the 2023 King's Birthday and Coronation Honours, Spearing was appointed a Companion of the New Zealand Order of Merit for services to haematology. Spearing is a Life Member of ALLG, the Australasian Leukaemia and Lymphoma Group.

== Selected works ==
- Brune, Mats; Sylvie Castaigne; John Catalano; et al. (2006). "Improved leukemia-free survival after postconsolidation immunotherapy with histamine dihydrochloride and interleukin-2 in acute myeloid leukemia: results of a randomized phase 3 trial". Blood. 108 (1): 88–96. doi:10.1182/blood-2005-10-4073. PMID 16556892. Wikidata Q28303488.
- J. T. Reilly; Snowden, John; Spearing, Ruth Lilian; P. M. Fitzgerald; N. Jones; A. Watmore; A. Potter (1997). "Cytogenetic abnormalities and their prognostic significance in idiopathic myelofibrosis: a study of 106 cases". British Journal of Haematology. 98 (1): 96–102. doi:10.1046/j.1365-2141.1997.1722990.x. PMID 9233570. Wikidata Q50945096.
- Smith SR; Cheesbrough J; Spearing, Ruth Lilian; Davies JM (1989). "Randomized prospective study comparing vancomycin with teicoplanin in the treatment of infections associated with Hickman catheters". Antimicrobial Agents and Chemotherapy. 33 (8): 1193–1197. doi:10.1128/aac.33.8.1193. PMC 172623. PMID 2529814. Wikidata Q35341106.
- JA Snowden; GR Hill; P Hunt; S Carnoutsos; Spearing, Ruth Lilian; E Espiner; DNJ Hart (2000). "Assessment of cardiotoxicity during haemopoietic stem cell transplantation with plasma brain natriuretic peptide". Bone Marrow Transplantation. 26 (3): 309–313. doi:10.1038/sj.bmt.1702507. PMID 10967571. Wikidata Q57252641.
- Walker, Logan C.; Jane Stevens; Campbell, Hamish George; Rob Corbett; Spearing, Ruth Lilian; David Heaton; Donald H Macdonald; Morris, Christine Margaret; Ganly, Peter S. (2002). "A novel inherited mutation of the transcription factor RUNX1 causes thrombocytopenia and may predispose to acute myeloid leukaemia". British Journal of Haematology. 117 (4): 878–881. doi:10.1046/j.1365-2141.2002.03512.x. PMID 12060124. Wikidata Q33342795.
- Yago Nieto; Patton, Nigel; Timothy Hawkins; et al. (2006). "Tacrolimus and mycophenolate mofetil after nonmyeloablative matched-sibling donor allogeneic stem-cell transplantations conditioned with fludarabine and low-dose total body irradiation". Biology of Blood and Marrow Transplantation. 12 (2): 217–225. doi:10.1016/j.bbmt.2005.10.012. PMID 16443519. Wikidata Q46916859.
