= New Zealand Energy Corporation =

Oil and Gas Company

New Zealand Energy Corp
- Company type: Public
- Headquarters: Vancouver, Canada
- Key people: John Proust, CEO
- Website: www.newzealandenergy.com

New Zealand Energy Corporation (NZEC) is an oil and gas producing company in New Zealand, established in 2010. It owns and operates gas and oil fields in Taranaki and has exploration permits in the East Coast Basin.

In 2013, NZEC purchased the Tariki, Waihapa and Ngaere mining licences and assets from Origin Energy.
