= Nicola Willis =

New Zealand politician

The Honourable Nicola Willis
- Willis in 2026

43rd Minister of Finance
- Incumbent
- Assumed office 27 November 2023
- Prime Minister: Christopher Luxon
- Preceded by: Grant Robertson

12th Minister for Economic Growth
- Incumbent
- Assumed office 24 January 2025
- Prime Minister: Christopher Luxon
- Preceded by: Melissa Lee (as Minister for Economic Development)

Minister for Social Investment
- Incumbent
- Assumed office 27 November 2023
- Prime Minister: Christopher Luxon

19th Deputy Leader of the National Party
- Incumbent
- Assumed office 30 November 2021
- Leader: Christopher Luxon
- Preceded by: Shane Reti

21st Minister for the Public Service
- In office 27 November 2023 – 24 January 2025
- Prime Minister: Christopher Luxon
- Preceded by: Andrew Little
- Succeeded by: Judith Collins

Deputy Leader of the Opposition
- In office 30 November 2021 – 27 November 2023
- Leader: Christopher Luxon
- Preceded by: Shane Reti
- Succeeded by: Carmel Sepuloni

Member of the New Zealand Parliament for National Party list
- In office 3 April 2018 – 7 November 2026
- Preceded by: Steven Joyce

Personal details
- Born: Nicola Valentine Willis; 7 March 1981 (age 45) Wellington, New Zealand
- Party: National
- Spouse: Duncan Small (m. 2007)
- Children: 4
- Education: Victoria University of Wellington; University of Canterbury
- Website: Party website

Nicola Valentine Willis (born 7 March 1981) is a New Zealand politician who was a list MP for the New Zealand National Party from 2018 to 2026, and served as deputy leader of the party since 2021. She is also the minister of finance, the minister for social investment, the minister for economic growth, and is the minister for the public services in the Sixth National Government.

After a secondary education as a boarder at Auckland private school King's College, Willis went on to gain a first-class honours degree in English literature from Victoria University of Wellington and a post-graduate diploma in journalism from the University of Canterbury. She entered the New Zealand House of Representatives on the National Party list in 2018 after a career as a political advisor and corporate lobbyist. She became her party's deputy leader in 2021, following the election of Christopher Luxon as party leader.

Following the 2023 New Zealand general election, Willis was appointed as Minister of Finance and Minister for Social Investment, and in 2025 she became Minister for Economic Growth. Following the 2026 New Zealand general election, Willis will no longer be a member of parliament. She may remain a Minister of the Crown up to 5 December 2026.

== Early life ==
Willis was born and raised in Point Howard, Lower Hutt. She is the eldest of three children. Willis's mother, Shona Valentine, was a journalist in the Parliamentary Press Gallery, her father a partner in corporate law firm Bell Gully who later rose to be chairman of the New Zealand Energy Corporation, an "active oil and gas exploration company". Her great-great-grandfather, Archibald Willis, was a Liberal Party member of Parliament from 1893 to 1896 and 1899 to 1905.

After what The Australian Women's Weekly describes as a "privileged childhood", she first attended Samuel Marsden Collegiate, a private school for girls, before asking to spend her last two years of high school as a boarder at King's College in Auckland – a decision she regretted, because "the boys were in charge." Her first job was as a cashier and server at a Wholly Bagels store in Thorndon, Wellington, later working in retail stores selling clothing. While studying English literature at Victoria University (VUW), she was a member of the VUW Debating Society, competing in international tournaments.

== Career ==
After graduating from Victoria University in 2003, Willis worked as a research and policy advisor for Bill English and as a senior advisor to John Key in 2008. During the preparation for the 2008 election, practice debate sessions were held for Key with Nicola Willis standing in for Helen Clark. She was asked to "dial it back a little" for fear of denting her candidate's confidence.

In 2012, Willis joined dairy co-operative Fonterra in a lobbyist role. She was later a general manager of Fonterra's nutrient management programme, and sat on the board of Export NZ, a division of lobbyist group Business New Zealand.

Willis was a director of the New Zealand Initiative, a pro-free-market public-policy Atlas Network linked think tank, from May 2016 until February 2017.

== In opposition, 2018–2023 ==
New Zealand Parliament
Years	Term	Electorate	List	Party
2018–2020	52nd	List	48	National
2020–2023	53rd	List	13	National
2023–2026	54th	List	2	National

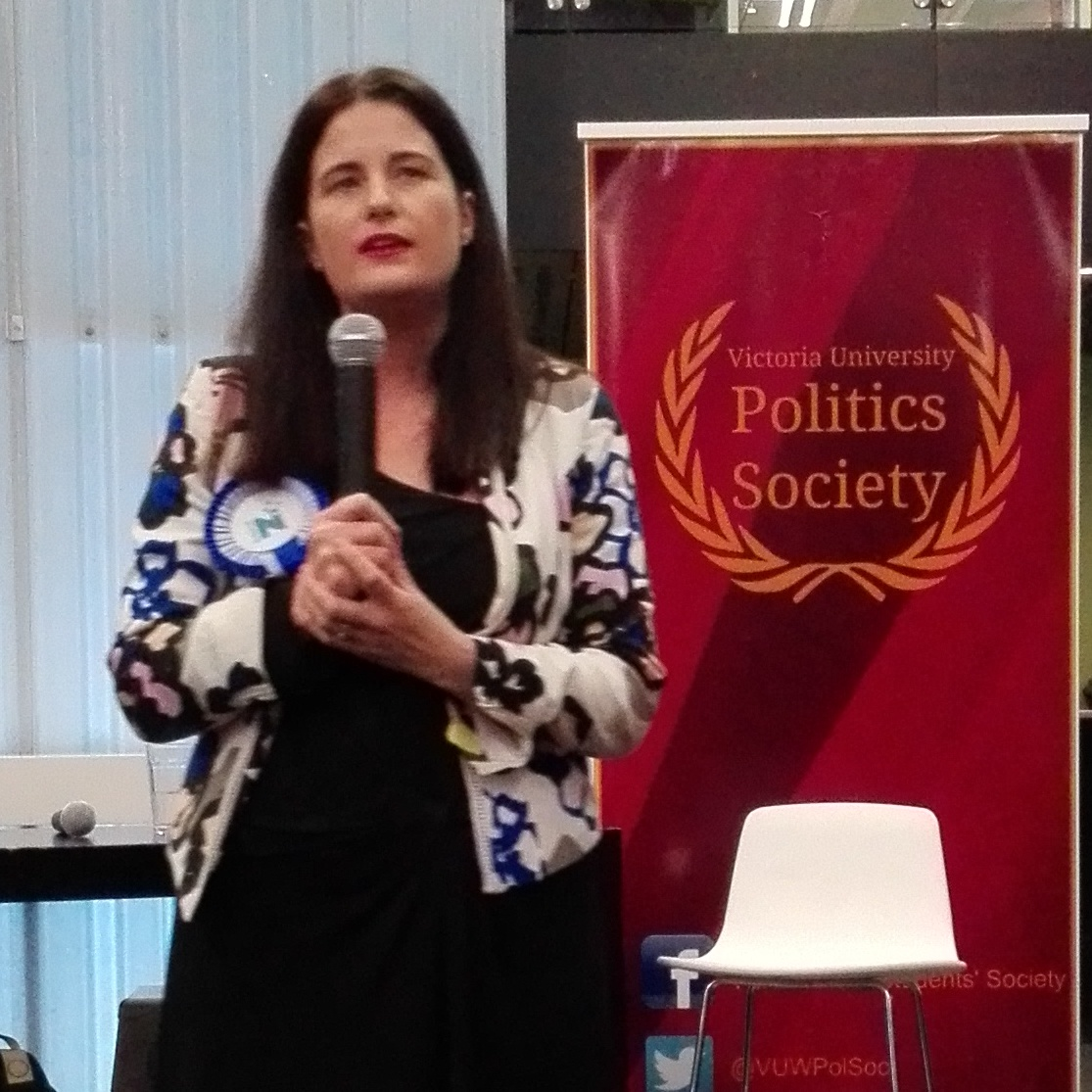
Willis speaking at the 2017 Wellington Central candidates debate

=== First term, 2018–2020 ===
Willis contested the 2017 election as National's candidate for the electorate of Wellington Central, and was number 48 on the party list. Her platform of being "a champion for the predator-free policy" and an "advocate for the city's 'world class public service'" gained her 26% of the electorate vote, about half of the vote given to Grant Robertson.

On the preliminary result, it appeared that Willis would enter parliament as a party list MP, but her party's final result was inadequate. As she was second in line to fill a National Party list vacancy, she was finally given a seat in parliament several months later, after the resignation of Steven Joyce in March 2018. National leader Simon Bridges appointed Willis National's spokesperson on early childhood education.

Willis was vocal against Grant Guilford's unsuccessful attempt to change Victoria University of Wellington's name to the University of Wellington.

Willis was a key player in Todd Muller's move to replace Bridges as party leader in a 2020 leadership coup, playing the role of Muller's "numbers man" alongside Chris Bishop. She was rewarded with a ranking of 14 in the party caucus, and the housing and urban development portfolios. Only 55 days later Muller resigned, becoming the shortest-serving leader of any political party represented in Parliament in New Zealand's history. Under Muller's replacement Judith Collins, Willis was ranked 13th in caucus and given the education portfolio. With Muller's backers Bishop and Willis rising under Collins, political commentators speculated that "potential dissenters are being kept busy with big new portfolios."

=== Second term, 2020–2023 ===
After the 2020 general election, Willis returned to parliament as a list MP, ranked 13, having lost again to Grant Robertson in the Wellington Central electorate. National was returned to Opposition and Willis was returned to the housing portfolio, where she worked with Housing Minister Megan Woods to develop bipartisan housing reform designed to encourage more medium density dwellings.

In November 2021, National Party leader Judith Collins lost a confidence vote and was removed by the National caucus. Willis was seen by media and political commentators as a contender for the party leadership or deputy leadership. Despite the speculation, she never launched a leadership bid, but was asked by Christopher Luxon to be his running mate as he launched a campaign for the leadership. They were elected unopposed on 30 November 2021, after Luxon's main rival, Simon Bridges, dropped his leadership bid in exchange for the finance portfolio. As deputy leader, Willis's liberal views on social issues are seen as a counterpoint to Luxon's more conservative positions.

Luxon unveiled his first shadow cabinet in December. Willis was assigned responsibility for housing and social investment. She picked up the finance portfolio in March 2022 when Bridges announced his resignation. As finance spokesperson, Willis defended National's policy of lowering tax rates despite criticisms that the policy would be inflationary; Luxon eventually dropped the policy.

In early August 2023, Willis introduced a private member's bill to allow parents to share their paid parental leave entitlement and take time off together. The bill was supported by all parliamentary parties except Labour, which used its majority to block the bill. In response, Willis accused Labour of "insulting every parent in New Zealand" in order to deny National a "win." During the lead-up to the 2023 New Zealand general election, Labour subsequently campaigned on raising paid partners' leave from two weeks to four weeks if re-elected.

== Sixth National Government, 2023–2026 ==
At the 2023 election, Willis tried for a third time to be elected as a local MP, nominated as the National Party candidate for Ōhāriu. However, the electorate preferred to retain Labour MP Greg O'Connor by a margin of 1,260 votes. Willis remained in Parliament on the National Party list.

The election put National in a position to form a coalition government. In late November 2023, Willis was appointed as Minister of Finance, Minister for the Public Service, Minister for Social Investment, and Associate Minister of Climate Change. In a January 2025 reshuffle, Willis dropped the public service portfolio and became the first Minister for Economic Growth, which succeeded the former economic development portfolio. The next month, she was designated as the Acting Minister of Commerce and Consumer Affairs (Grocery Sector) due to the new minister, Scott Simpson, declaring a conflict of interest in that part of his portfolio.

=== Income relief of $250 a fortnight ===
In the run up to the 2023 New Zealand general election, Willis announced that if National were elected, her government would implement tax cuts amounting to $14 billion over four years, and that families with children would benefit by up to $250 a fortnight. In mid September 2023, Willis admitted that only 3,000 households would get the full tax relief under National's proposed tax policy, but denied that National had misled voters. She said she would resign if National failed to deliver on its tax reduction plan.

=== Foreign home buyers tax ===
To compensate for lost revenue, Willis proposed reopening the housing market to foreign buyers and taxing them 15% on purchases over $2 million. The plan was criticised by a number of economists during the campaign, with claims there were insufficient wealthy foreigners wanting to buy houses in New Zealand and the government would be $530 million short each year. In post-election coalition negotiations, the foreign buyer policy was abandoned.

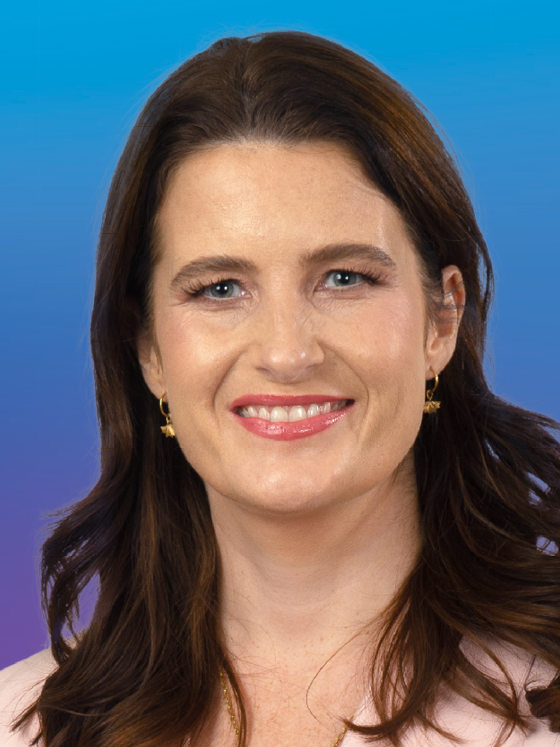
Willis in 2024

=== The Interislander ferry fleet controversy ===
On 13 December, Willis declined KiwiRail's request for an additional NZ$1.47 billion to replace its ageing Interislander ferry fleet. Funding to purchase two new ferries from Hyundai at a fixed cost of $551 million and delivery in 2026 had previously been approved by the outgoing Labour Government. $300 million was allocated to cover the cancellation of the iRex ferry project including cancelled infrastructure contracts and a break-fee with Hyundai.

Willis' decision to scrap the project was criticised by Labour's finance spokesperson Grant Robertson, the Maritime Union of New Zealand, the Rail and Maritime Transport Union, the New Zealand Merchant Service Guild and the Aviation and Marine Engineers Association who called on her to resign as Finance Minister. The decision and subsequent activity has been described as the "ferry fiasco".

In mid December 2024, Willis claimed she had 'delivered' on the ferries when the coalition government announced a new company would be established to procure two new vessels. The company had three shareholding ministers: Simeon Brown, Nicola Willis and Winston Peters, who was given a new responsibility as the Minister for Rail. In early March 2025, Winston Peters reported that two new smaller Interislander ferries would delivered in 2029. In October 2026, the replacements had exceeded their new budget of $1.747 billion, with the final costs still unknown.

=== Budget cuts 2023 ===
On 20 December 2023 Willis unveiled the Government's mini-budget, which she said would deliver NZ$7.47 billion in operational savings. Willis said: "Our Government is committed to getting the books back in order and effectively managing taxpayers' money. We have found billions of dollars' worth of savings within weeks of being elected, and we intend to continue this savings-drive to deliver a better deal for all New Zealanders." A year later, on 17 December 2024, she conceded that the government's finances would remain in deficit until at least 2029.

=== Disability funding ===
In March 2024, Penny Simmonds, Minister for Disabled People, announced cuts to funding for support systems for the disabled declaring the Government would not increase funding to maintain support for disabled people and their families "because the Government's coffers are not an endless open pit". Following criticism from disabled people's carers and families following the Ministry's cuts which were made without consultation with the sector, Willis summoned Penny Simmonds for an urgent briefing. On 26 March, she announced that future decisions about the Ministry's funding would go to the New Zealand Cabinet to be signed off, with the disabled community being consulted.

=== The 2024 budget ===
In late March 2024, Willis released the Government's "Budget Policy Statement." She also confirmed that the Government would set a smaller budget allowance that the previous Labour Government, with no new borrowing. Despite slower than expected economic growth, Willis affirmed the Government's promise to limit the net amount of new funding added to the upcoming budget to NZ$3.5 billion.

In late May 2024, Willis delivered the 2024 New Zealand budget, which delivered NZ$14 billion worth of tax cuts ranging from NZ$4 and NZ$40 a fortnight for all workers earning more than NZ$14,000. The Government also increased the Working for Families in-work tax credit, giving 160,000 low and middle-income families with children up to NZ$50 a fortnight.

=== Pharmac funding for cancer drugs ===
In the 2024 budget, the Government decided not to fulfill its promise to fund thirteen new cancer treatment drugs, which it claimed was due to a NZ$1.77 billion funding "cliff" in Pharmac's budget left by the previous Labour Government. In response, Willis said that the Government would seek to find funding for cancer treatments in the 2025 budget.

=== Working from home ===
In late September 2024, Willis issued a new guidance for the public service to limit "working at home" practices, stating that "working from home is not an entitlement and must be agreed and monitored." While Willis accepted that working from home arrangements could be beneficial to workers and employers, she said that it also had a negative impact on work performance, as well as CBD retailers, restaurants and cafes near public service departments and offices.

On 17 December 2024, Willis announced that the minimum wage for adult workers would rise by 1.5% from $23.15 to $23.50, marking the smallest percentage increase since the 1990s. In addition, she confirmed that training and starting wages for young employees would rise to $18.80.

=== The deficit ===
Less than a month later, Willis projected that the New Zealand Treasury's finances would remain in deficit until at least 2029 due to the $14 billion worth of tax cuts introduced by her government. She said that over the next four years, the government now expected to receive $3.7 billion less per year in taxation revenue. In addition, Willis confirmed that the Government would adopt a new financial indicator to measure the operating balance before gains and losses (OBEGAL) known as OBEGALx, which excluded ACC deficits from the equation. Willis claimed that ACC deficits, which amounted to $4.1 billion in the 2023/24 financial year, had distorted the Government's finances.

=== Economic growth ===
Following a cabinet reshuffle on 19 January 2025, Willis also assumed the economic growth portfolio. As Minister for Economic Growth, Willis announced that the Government would be introducing a digital nomads visa. This visa would allow non-residents working for a foreign employer to work in New Zealand for up to nine months. Their work would be untaxed for up to 90 days.

As Minister for Economic Growth, Willis has proposed scrapping 24 of the 71 procurement rules for private firms to acquire government contracts. The proposed 24 scrapped rules include paying the Living Wage in cleaning, catering and security guard contracts, purchasing recyclable and waste-efficient office products, and purchasing electric and hybrid vehicles. She has also proposed introducing a new economic benefit test for awarding good, services and refurbishment contracts over NZ$100,000, and construction contracts over NZ$9 million. The E tū union expressed opposition to the Government's proposal to scrap the Living Wage requirement for government contractors, stating that it "came after years of campaigning."

In late August 2025, Willis announced that the Government would introduce legislation in November 2025 to ease the consent process for new supermarket chains seeking to enter the New Zealand supermarket sector. These policies include amending the Fast-track Approvals Act 2024 to create a single building consent authority to manage supermarket consents nationwide and amending the Building Act to make it easier for supermarkets to use pre-approved "MultiProof" building designs. She said that this new "express lane" policy would help break the Foodstuffs-Woolworths supermarket duopoly. In response, the Green Party's commerce and consumer affairs spokesperson Ricardo Menéndez March said that the Government's proposed policy did not go far enough in breaking up the supermarket duopoly while Labour's finance spokesperson Barbara Edmonds said that the fast-track regime would not help ordinary New Zealanders.

=== The 2025 budget ===
Prior to the release of the 2025 New Zealand budget in May 2025, Willis announced that the Government would reduce its operating budget from NZ$2.4 billion to NZ$1.3 billion. She also announced the demise of the Digital Services Tax – which Treasury estimated would raise more than NZ$100 million a year – following threats of retaliation from US President Donald Trump. She confirmed that the 2025 budget would focus on health, education, law and order, defence, with some limited spending on critical "social investments," supporting business growth and targeted cost of living relief.

=== Rates capping ===
In early July 2025, Willis said that the Government was exploring capping local and regional councils' rates as a means of combating alleged "wasteful spending." She also said that councils should consider using other funding and financing tools to fund infrastructure. In response, Labour leader Chris Hipkins criticised the National-led coalition government's reversal of the previous Labour government's policies including the Three Waters reform programme for contributing to councils' rate increases. Similarly, Local Government New Zealand president and Mayor of Selwyn Sam Broughton said that capping rates would leave local councils unable to fund essential infrastructure. By contrast, Mayor of Christchurch Phil Mauger supported the Government's rates capping proposal, stating that there needed to be greater clarity around "basic" spending.

=== 2026 review of Reserve Bank's COVID policies ===
On 11 February 2026, Willis announced the Government would review the Reserve Bank of New Zealand's decisions during the COVID-19 pandemic to lower the Official Cash Rate to 0.25 and inject NZ$55 billion worth of digital money into the New Zealand economy.

=== 2026 budget ===
In late May 2026, Willis released the 2026 New Zealand budget. During the 2026 Budget Speech, she said that the Government's "responsible approach" to spending would allow the New Zealand economy to return to surplus by 2028/29. She said the strained "rules-based global system" had led countries to boost their defence spending. Willis also acknowledged the impact of the 2026 Iran war on petrol and diesel prices for households and businesses. Willis also warned that the New Zealand Government was facing a significant burden of debt amounting to $9 billion in interest each year. She also said that New Zealand needed to reduce its debt due to its negative sovereign debt rating from Fitch Ratings and Moody's. Willis also rejected the idea of using "election-year band-aids and sugar hits" to "bribe voters," and said that the Government would focus on "getting the books in order."

=== Exit from Parliament ===
During the 2026 New Zealand general election, Willis was ranked second on the National Party list. She opted not to contest an electorate during that election.

On election night, the National Party's share of the vote entitled it to no more seats in Parliament than it had already gained in local electorates. Willis was the most senior of many list-only MPs who therefore were not re-elected to the next parliamentary term. Following the release of preliminary results on 8 November, Willis attended her last caucus meeting on 10 November. She described the election outcome as "emotional" but said that she would have "a lot more space in my life." Per Parliamentary convention, Willis remains Finance Minister in a caretaker capacity until the release of final results on 27 November.

=== Criticisms of her economic policies ===
In the lead-up to the 2023 election, Willis promoted a fiscal plan with tax cuts worth about $14.6 billion over four years. She was criticised by coalition partner, Winston Peters—during his state of the nation speech in Palmerston North in March 2024, he said the tax cuts meant the government would be $5.6 billion short trying to pay for all of its campaign commitments. To reduce the shortfall, Willis and the coalition cabinet ordered significant staff cutbacks and redundancies in the public service.

==== From economists ====
In November 2024, a group of 15 economists sent an open letter to Willis and Christopher Luxon criticising the Government's economic policies as short-sighted, declaring that "your sinking-lid cuts to the public service are powerful contributors to the current severe and prolonged recession." The group said that the current economic policies were hurting the poorest the most, detering business investment, threatening small businesses and driving skilled people to leave the country.

In October 2025, 20 economists wrote Willis a second letter. Ganesh Nana, former head of the New Zealand Productivity Commission, was one of the signatories. He said the group was compelled to write a second time because the state of the economy had declined even further. The economists gave Willis a long list of problems: unemployment is at record levels with more than 400,000 New Zealanders out of work, while food and power prices remain stubbornly high. The construction sector has collapsed, and manufacturing output is now smaller than a decade ago. Economic growth is in decline and business liquidations are about to hit an all-time high. Willis responded to the letter saying: "I don't agree."

==== From business leaders ====
In September 2025, Damien Grant claimed "corporate New Zealand has written off this administration." He was commenting on a Boardroom survey which found that many chief financial officers (CFOs) feel Willis' policies do not adequately support business investment or address key issues such as tax policy reform, infrastructure, healthcare, and immigration. Nearly 80% of those surveyed think significant policy changes are needed to accelerate business progress.

Business leaders have criticized what they perceive as a defensive mindset, cost-cutting focus, and the prioritization of minority party agendas over national economic needs. Business lobby groups echo these sentiments, criticizing government distractions on cultural issues while urgent fiscal stimulus and economic growth measures are needed. Some business leaders advocate for broadening the tax base and shifting investment focus away from residential housing towards the productive economy.

==== Calls for her resignation ====
In September 2025, the June quarterly figures showed a drop of 0.9% in GDP with falls in 10 out of 16 industries. The cancellation of building projects for Kāinga Ora alone disrupted so many contracts the construction industry lost 16,000 jobs and led to the closure of 1,100 companies in the last two years. GDP has now shrunk in three of the past five quarters, prompting former Finance Minister Roger Douglas and University of Auckland, chair of macroeconomics Robert MacCulloch to call on Willis to resign. They claimed "Willis is not up to the job and is not levelling with the New Zealand public."

==== Conflict with the Taxpayers' Union ====
In December 2025, the right-wing lobby group the New Zealand Taxpayers' Union (TPU) launched a pressure campaign attacking Willis and her government's financial management, alleging that government spending exceeded the previous Sixth Labour government. The TPU released packaged fudge from the "Nicola Fudge Co.," branded with an image of Willis with the slogan "A treat today - A tax tomorrow." On 9 December, Willis challenged the organisation's chair Ruth Richardson, who served as Finance Minister in the Fourth National Government, to a debate in Parliament on the Government's financial management. Following disagreements about the host and venue for the debate, Richardson pulled out of the debate on 16 December, stating the she would not be a "party to a circus or a sideshow designed to distract from fiscal failure." In response, Willis accused the Taxpayers' Union of being unwilling to show up for the debate and defended the Government's financial management.

== Views and positions ==
In 2021 Willis was described as a social liberal, having a focus on LGBT rights and action on climate change. She is a member of the National Party's BlueGreen environmental caucus. Willis supports euthanasia, and is pro-choice. She considers herself a feminist.

In the 2020 New Zealand general election, Willis' unsuccessful campaign in the Wellington Central electorate focussed heavily on increasing roading in the central city, with the slogan 'Four Lanes to the Planes'.

In 2018, Willis voted in support of the Labour government's Equal Pay Bill, saying "Equal pay matters ... We all, I believe, want to live in a country and a world in which men and women have equal opportunities, are equally rewarded for their work, and are able to progress and fulfil their own potential to the maximum extent possible." In 2025, she announced her party's support for a Bill to halt all pay equity claims taken under that Act, saying, "I'm a feminist, I wear the badge proudly".

== Personal life ==
Willis married Duncan Small in 2007, and they have four children.

Political offices
Preceded by Grant Robertson	Minister of Finance; 2023–present	Incumbent
Preceded by Andrew Little	Minister for the Public Service; 2023–present	Incumbent
Party political offices
Preceded by Shane Reti	Deputy Leader of the National Party; 2021–present	Incumbent
