= Jennifer Curtin =

New Zealand public policy academic

- Education: Australian National University
- Scientific career
- Fields: Public policy
- Workplaces: University of Auckland
- Thesis: Women in trade unions : strategies for the representation of women's interests in four countries (1997)

Jennifer Curtin is a New Zealand public policy academic, and a full professor at the University of Auckland.

== Academic career ==
After a 1997 PhD titled 'Women in trade unions : strategies for the representation of women's interests in four countries' at the Australian National University, Curtin moved to the University of Auckland, rising to full professor. Curtin is a frequent political columnist in the New Zealand and international media.

== Selected works ==
- Curtin, Jennifer. A digital divide in rural and regional Australia?. Department of Parliamentary Library, 2001.
- Curtin, Jennifer. Women and trade unions: A comparative perspective. Routledge, 2018.
- Curtin, Jennifer. "Women, political leadership and substantive representation: The case of New Zealand." Parliamentary Affairs 61, no. 3 (2008): 490–504.
- Costar, Brian J., and Jennifer Curtin. Rebels with a cause: independents in Australian politics. UNSW Press, 2004.
