= Pharmac =

New Zealand Crown entity

Pharmaceutical Management Agency
Agency overview
- Formed: 1993
- Jurisdiction: New Zealand
- Headquarters: Level 9 Simpl House 40 Mercer Street Wellington Central Wellington 6011 New Zealand
- Employees: Approximately 120
- Ministers responsible: Simeon Brown, Minister of Health; David Seymour, Associate Minister of Health (Pharmac)
- Agency executives: Sarah Fitt, Chief Executive; Paula Bennett, Chair
- Website: www.pharmac.govt.nz

The Pharmaceutical Management Agency (Māori: Te Pātaka Whaioranga), better known as Pharmac, is a New Zealand Crown entity that decides, on behalf of Te Whatu Ora – Health New Zealand, which medicines and pharmaceutical products are subsidised for use in the community and public hospitals. Pharmac's legislative objective is "to secure for eligible people in need of pharmaceuticals, the best health outcomes that are reasonably achievable from pharmaceutical treatment and from within the amount of funding provided".

== Roles and functions ==
Pharmac's current governing legislation is the Pae Ora (Healthy Futures) Act 2022, specifically sections 67 to 74. Section 67(3) states that Pharmac is a Crown entity in terms of Section 7 of the Crown Entities Act 2004.

Pharmac's main objective is to secure the best health outcomes for "eligible people" in need of pharmaceuticals that are reasonably attainable from pharmaceutical treatment and within the amount of funding provided.

Pharmac's functions are to maintain the New Zealand pharmaceutical schedule, manage incidents arising out of the procurement of pharmaceutical products for "eligible people," meet its objectives within its operational budget, promote the responsible use of pharmaceuticals, and to seek permission from the Minister of Health and its governing board for performing other non-statutory functions.

One of the main techniques Pharmac uses to reduce costs is only subsidising one brand of a medication at a time. Where a medicine is off-patent and generic versions are available, Pharmac typically tenders out the right to be the sole subsidised brand for a fixed period of time (usually three years). This causes pharmaceutical companies to compete with each other, driving down prices and reducing the subsidy costs, freeing up funds to subsidise newer patented medicines.

As a Crown entity, the agency is responsible to the Minister of Health via its board of six members.

== History ==
=== Origins and mandate ===
Pharmac was created in 1993 as a response to the ever-increasing costs of pharmaceuticals. The agency's primary aim is "to secure for eligible people in need of pharmaceuticals, the best health outcomes that are reasonably achievable from pharmaceutical treatment and from within the amount of funding provided."

While initially responsible for community medicines only, Pharmac's role has been expanded to include all medicines used in district health boards' hospitals, and in preparation for the national management of medical devices. On 1 July 2012, the management of the national immunisation schedule, and assessment of new vaccines was transferred to Pharmac from the Ministry of Health.

In 2016/17, Pharmac had a subsidy budget of approximately $850 million, which was used to subsidise 48.5 million prescriptions issued to 3.6 million New Zealanders.

=== Sixth Labour Government, 2017–2023 ===
In early March 2021, Prime Minister Jacinda Ardern and Health Minister Andrew Little announced that the Government would be appointing a panel of experts to review Pharmac's timeliness and transparency of decision-making.

In early October 2023, chief executive Sarah Fitt attracted criticism after the journalist Rachel Smalley obtained 274 pages of internal communications between Fitt and other executives under the Official Information Act. These emails exposed a disdain for Smalley and her efforts to promote greater accountability from the government body. Health Minister Ayesha Verrall, Pharmac Chair Steve Maharey, and Public Service Commissioner Peter Hughes described Fitt's conduct as unprofessional. Haemotologist and chronic lymphocytic leukemia advocate Ruth Spearing and Patient Voice Aotearoa chairperson Malcolm Mulholland called for Fitt to resign.

=== Sixth National Government, 2023–present ===
In late November 2023, the new Associate Health Minister David Seymour called for a change in Pharmac's culture in light of CEO Sarah Fitt's conduct. That same month, Fitt apologised to Smalley and Pharmac's governing board, and agreed to an external plan to improve Pharmac's culture including hiring an external party to assist the senior leadership team and board.

In early December 2023, Maharey resigned from his position as Chair of Pharmac after the formation of a National-led coalition government following the 2023 New Zealand general election. In late April 2024, former Deputy Prime Minister Paula Bennett was appointed as the Chair of Pharmac.

In mid-July 2024, Associate Health Minister David Seymour instructed the purchasing agency to stop factorising the Treaty of Waitangi in its decisions, writing that "Pharmac's role should focus on delivering improved health outcomes underpinned by robust data and evidence, in accordance with its statutory responsibilities. This should serve all New Zealanders based on actual need, without assigning their background as a proxy of need." While Seymour's directive was supported by the Pharmac board chair Paula Bennett and Patient Voice Aotearoa chair Malcolm Mulholland, it was criticised by former Māori Health Authority clinical lead Dr Rawiri McKree Jansen, who said that the Government could do more to improve Māori access to health services and medicines. In response, Pharmac director Dr Anthony Jordan resigned from his position on 19 July due to his disagreement with the Government's Treaty directive.

In mid-November 2024, Pharmac disestablished its Māori advisory group. Chairperson Bennett said that the disestablishment would allow the purchasing agency to focus on existing partnership agreements. By contrast, the advisory group's co-chair Eugene Berryman-Kamp expressed disappointment in the reduction of Māori input into the organisation's decision-making process. In late April 2025, Pharmac proposed disestablishing its Māori Directorate, which would lead to the loss of three jobs including those responsible for supporting an anti-racism research programme. Public Service Association Māori spokesperson Janice Panoho described the job cut proposal as a breach of the Treaty of Waitangi.

== Reception ==
=== Health and academic circles ===
Pharmac has been hailed for its success in controlling New Zealand's expenditure on pharmaceuticals. A British Medical Journal article in 2010 credited Pharmac as the key reason for New Zealand's low pharmaceutical prices.

=== Trans-Pacific Partnership Agreement ===
Pharmac was a regular point of contention in debates around potential free-trade agreements which could affect its ability to operate, particularly the Trans-Pacific Partnership Agreement (TPPA).

New Zealand's Pharmaceutical market and Pharmac were noted to feature heavily in leaked diplomatic cables in 2010.

Opponents of the TPPA claimed US corporations are hoping to weaken Pharmac's ability to get inexpensive, generic medicines by forcing New Zealand to pay for brand name drugs. Doctors and organisations like Médecins Sans Frontières have also expressed concern. The New Zealand Government denies the claims; Trade Negotiations Minister Tim Groser accused opponents of the deal of being "fools" who were "trying to "wreck this agreement".
