= 2025 in New Zealand =

- Decades: 2000s; 2010s; 2020s
- See also: History of New Zealand; List of years in New Zealand; Timeline of New Zealand history

The following lists events that happened during 2025 in New Zealand.

== Incumbents ==
=== Regal and vice-regal ===
- Head of state – Charles III
- Governor-General – Cindy Kiro
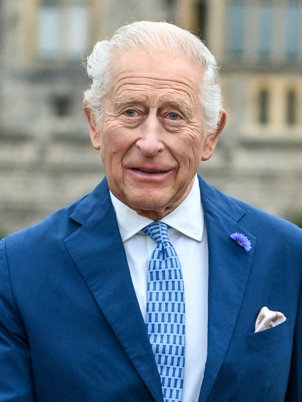
Charles III

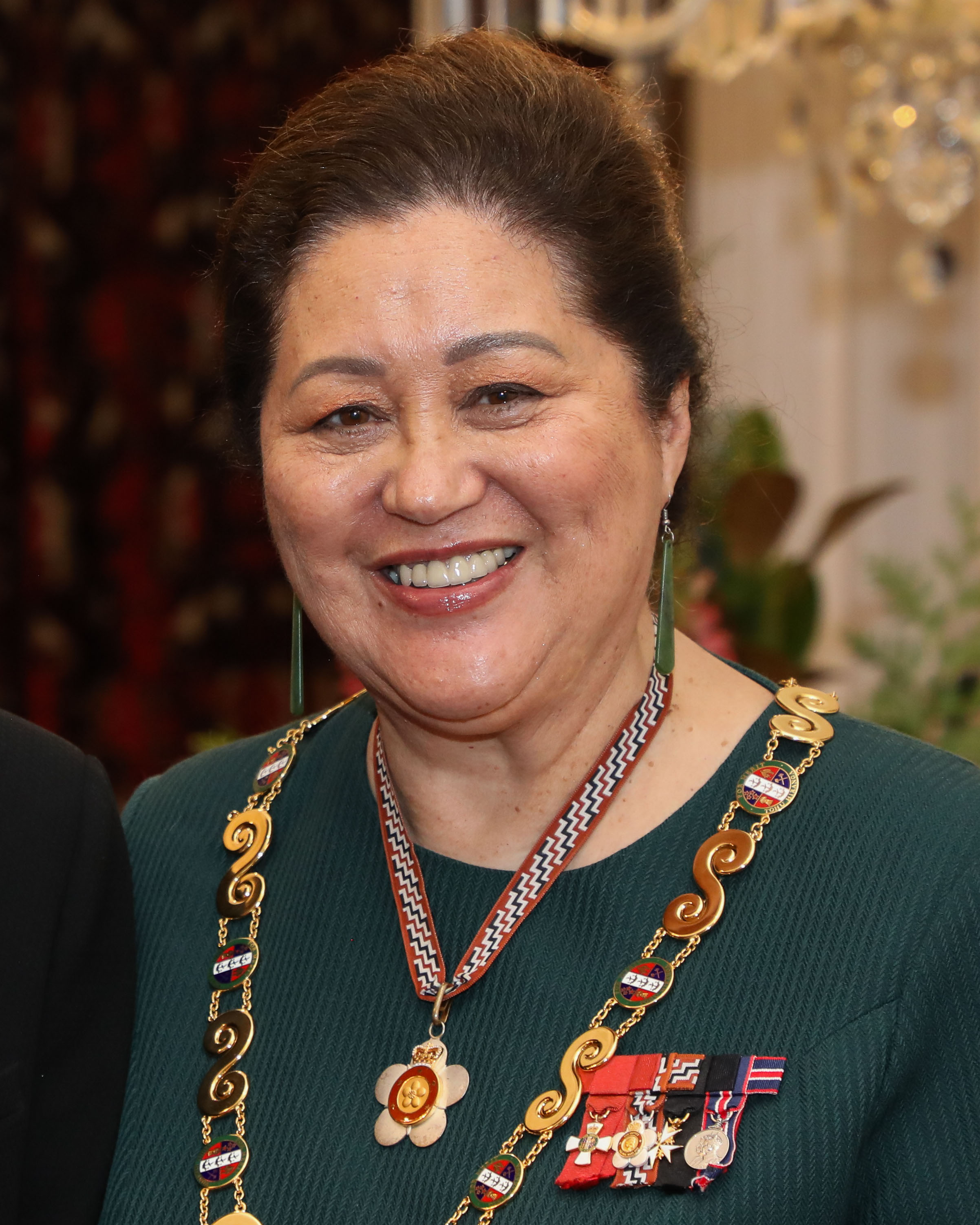
Cindy Kiro

=== Government ===
Legislature term: 54th New Zealand Parliament.

The Sixth National Government, elected in 2023, continues.

- Speaker of the House – Gerry Brownlee
- Prime Minister – Christopher Luxon
- Deputy Prime Minister – Winston Peters until 31 May, and then David Seymour
- Leader of the House – Chris Bishop
- Minister of Finance – Nicola Willis
- Minister of Foreign Affairs – Winston Peters
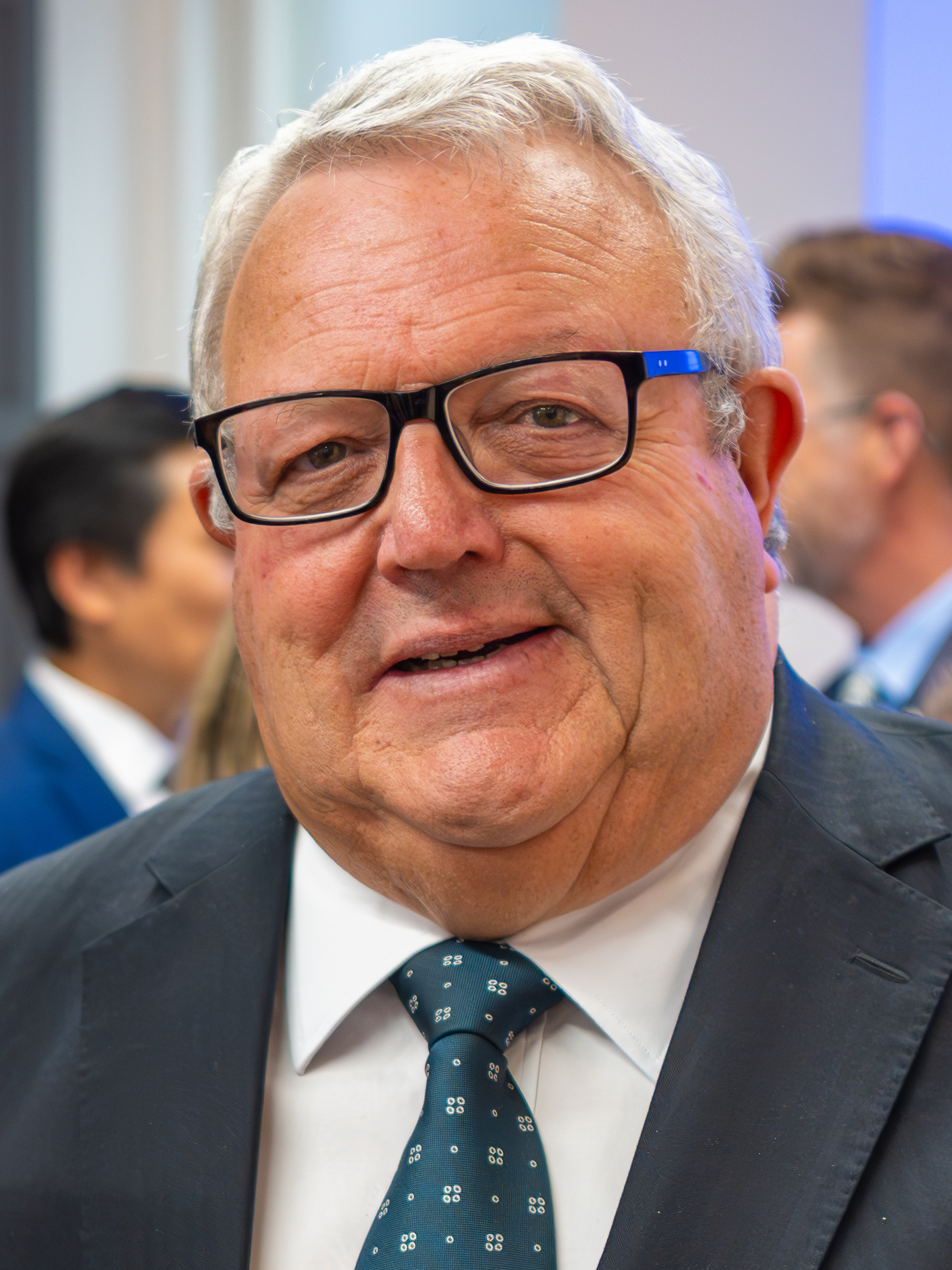
Gerry Brownlee

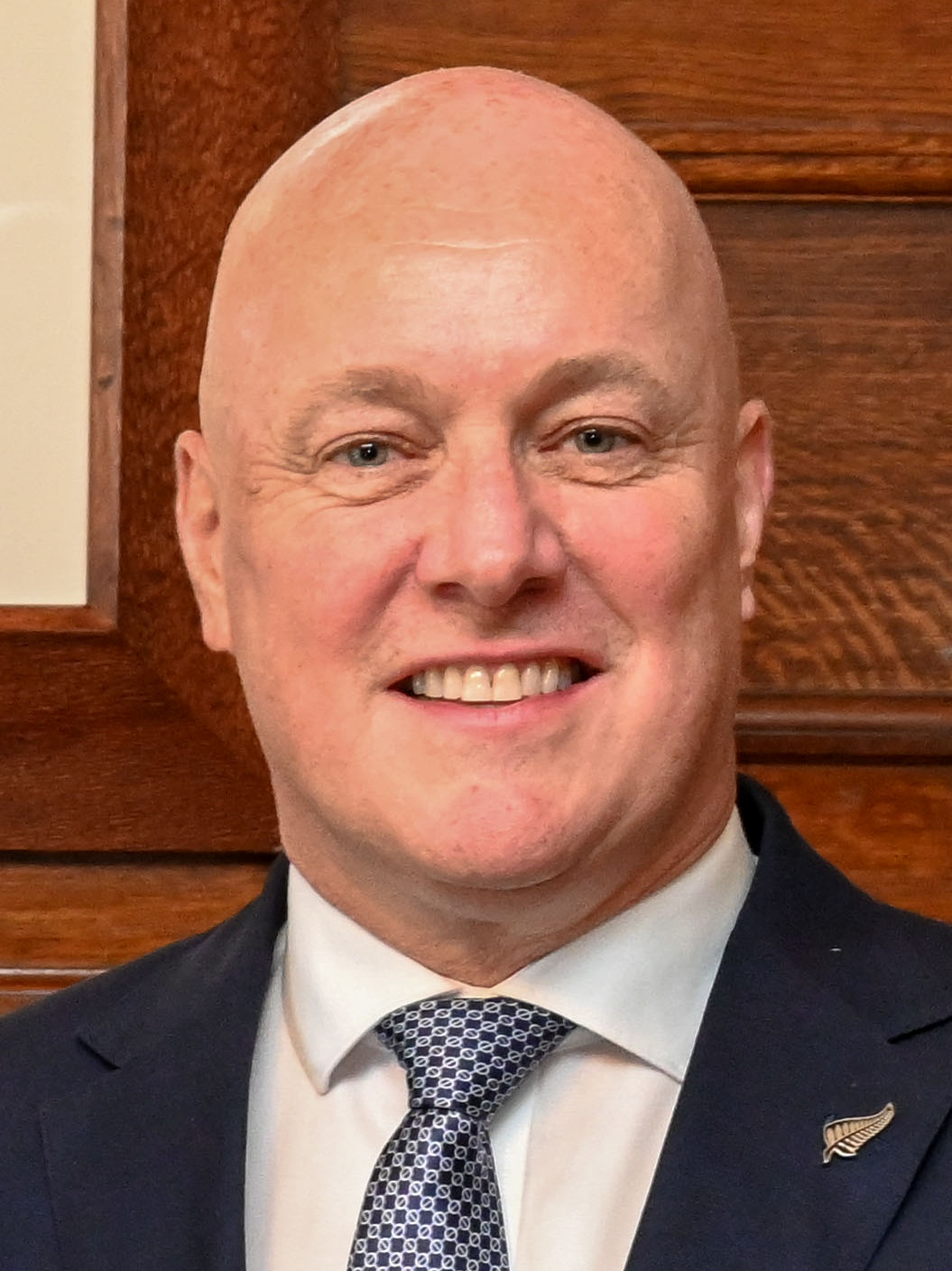
Christopher Luxon

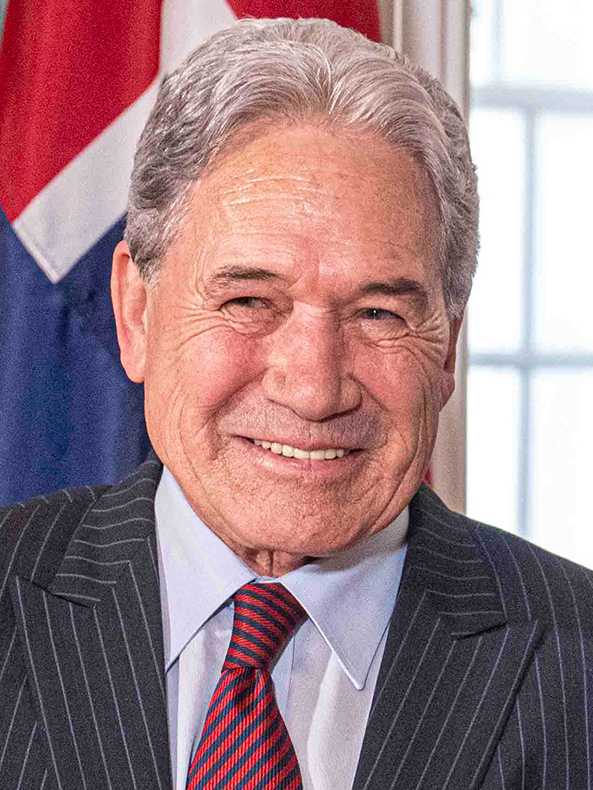
Winston Peters

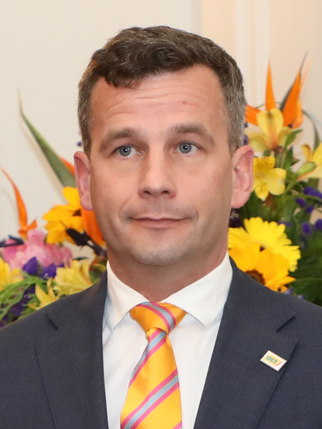
David Seymour

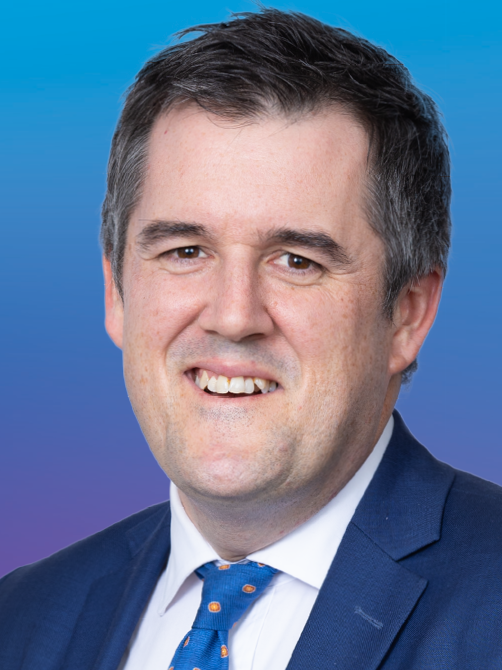
Chris Bishop

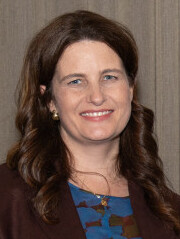
Nicola Willis

=== Other party leaders in parliament ===
- Labour – Chris Hipkins (Leader of the Opposition)
- Green – Marama Davidson and Chlöe Swarbrick
- ACT – David Seymour
- NZ First – Winston Peters
- Te Pāti Māori – Rawiri Waititi and Debbie Ngarewa-Packer
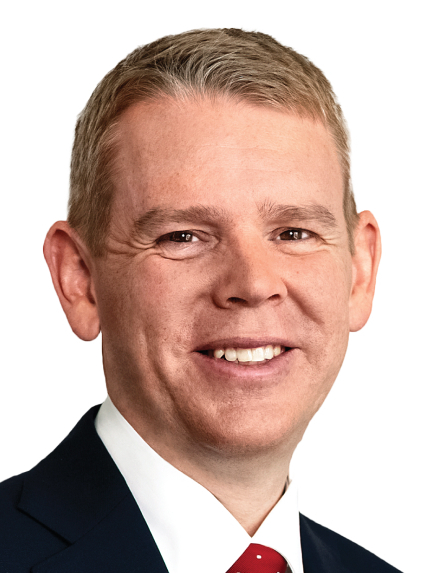
Chris Hipkins

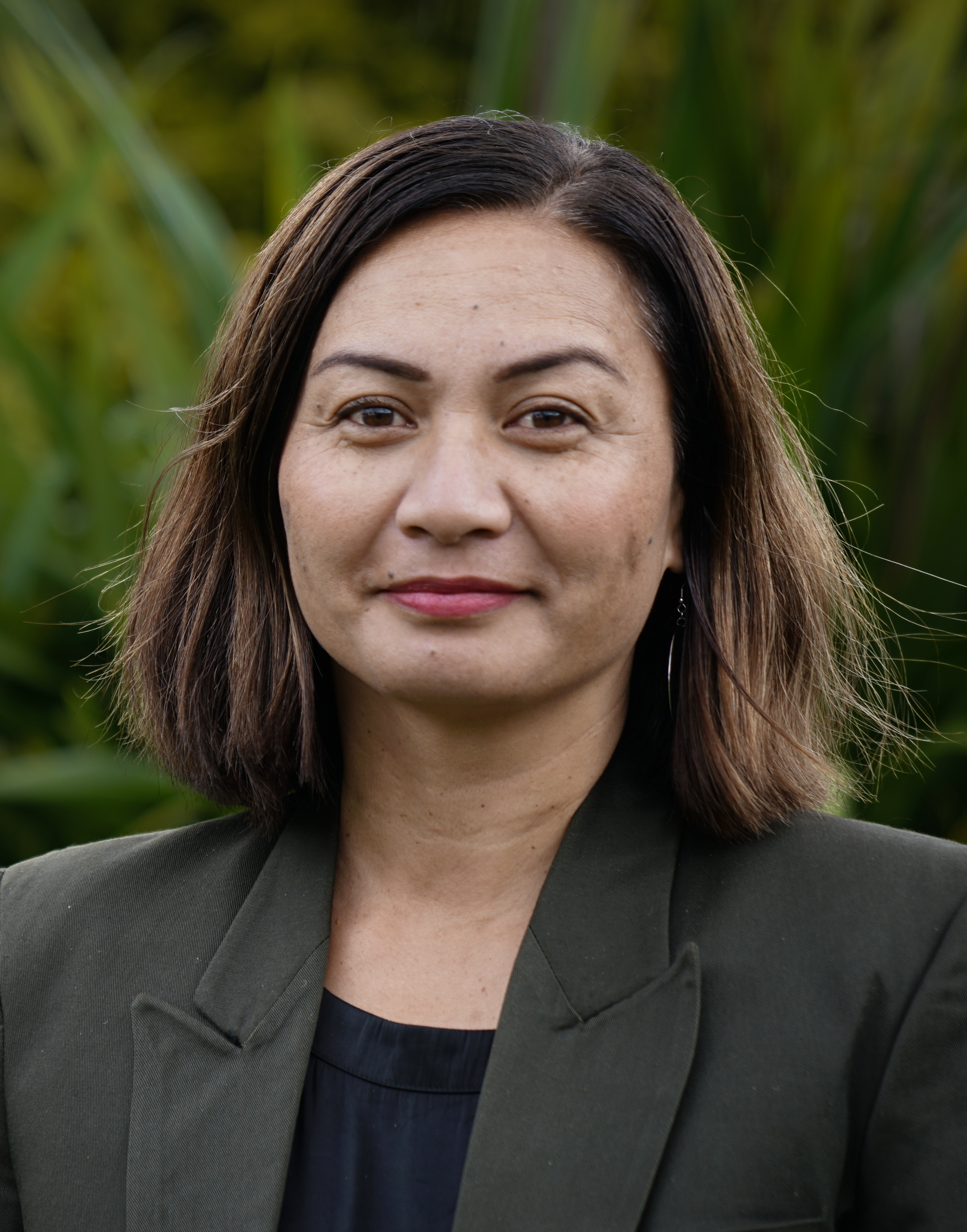
Marama Davidson

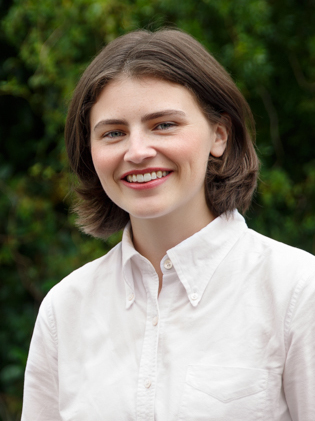
Chlöe Swarbrick

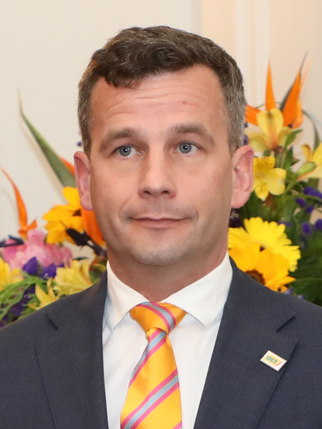
David Seymour

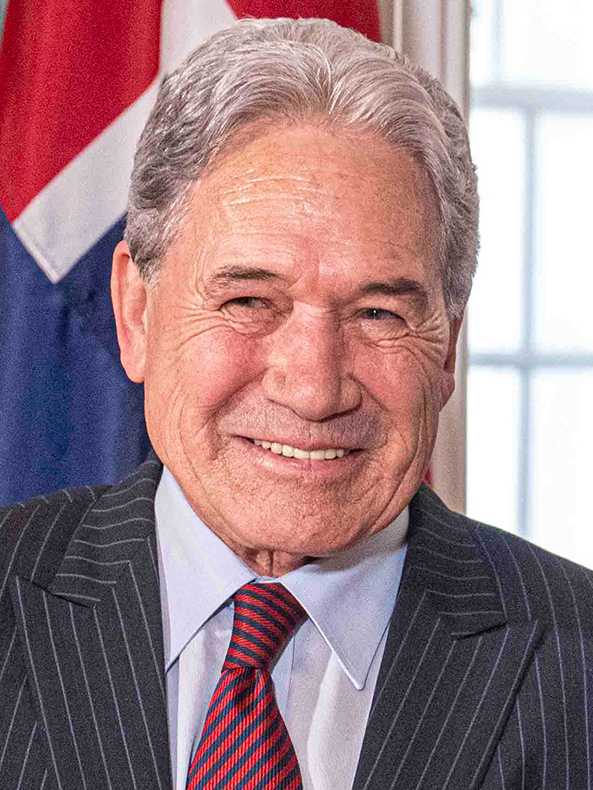
Winston Peters

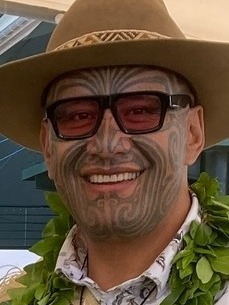
Rawiri Waititi

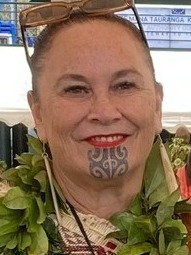
Debbie Ngarewa‑Packer

=== Judiciary ===
- Chief Justice – Helen Winkelmann
- President of the Court of Appeal – Christine French
- Chief High Court judge – Sally Fitzgerald
- Chief District Court judge – Heemi Taumaunu
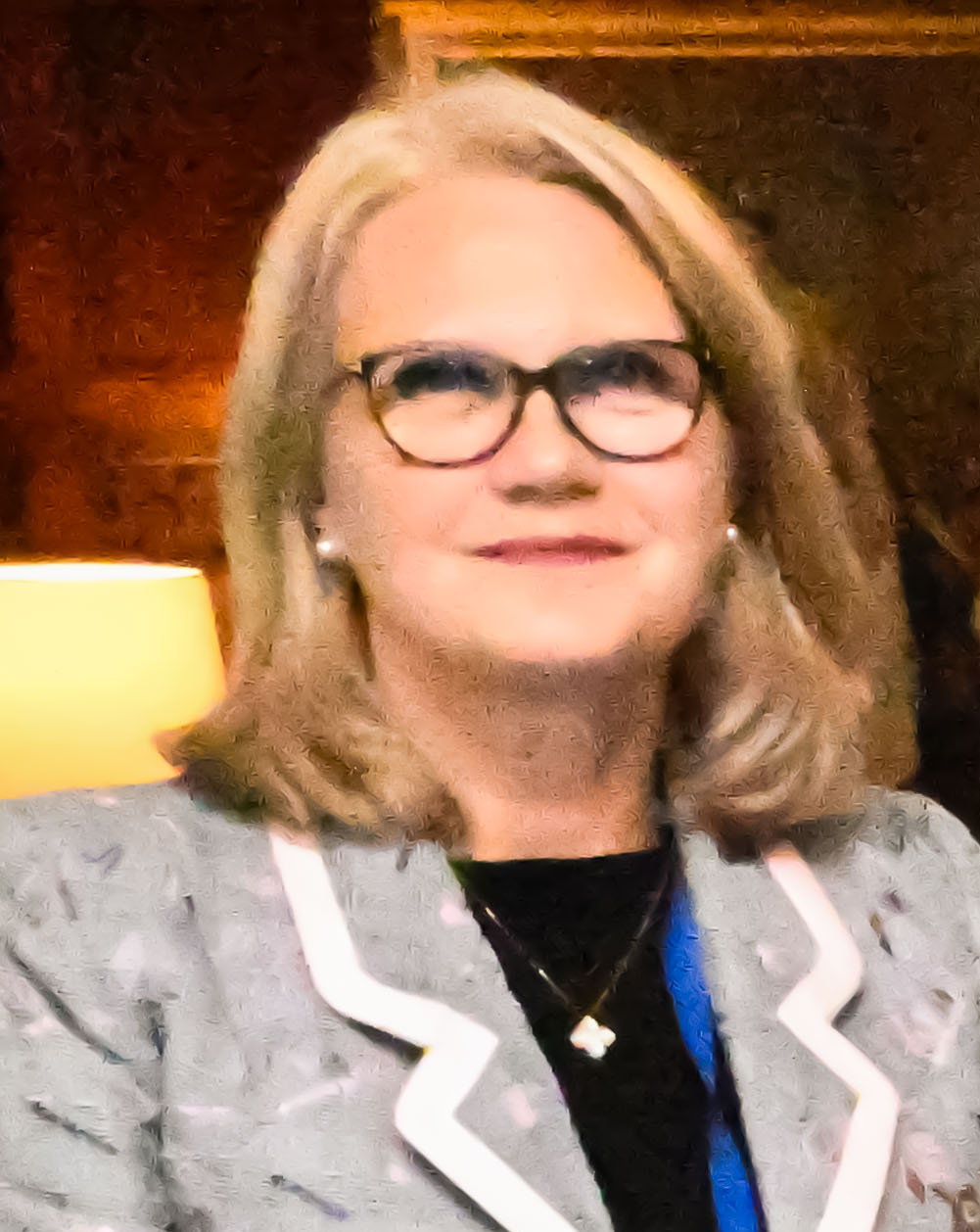
Helen Winkelmann

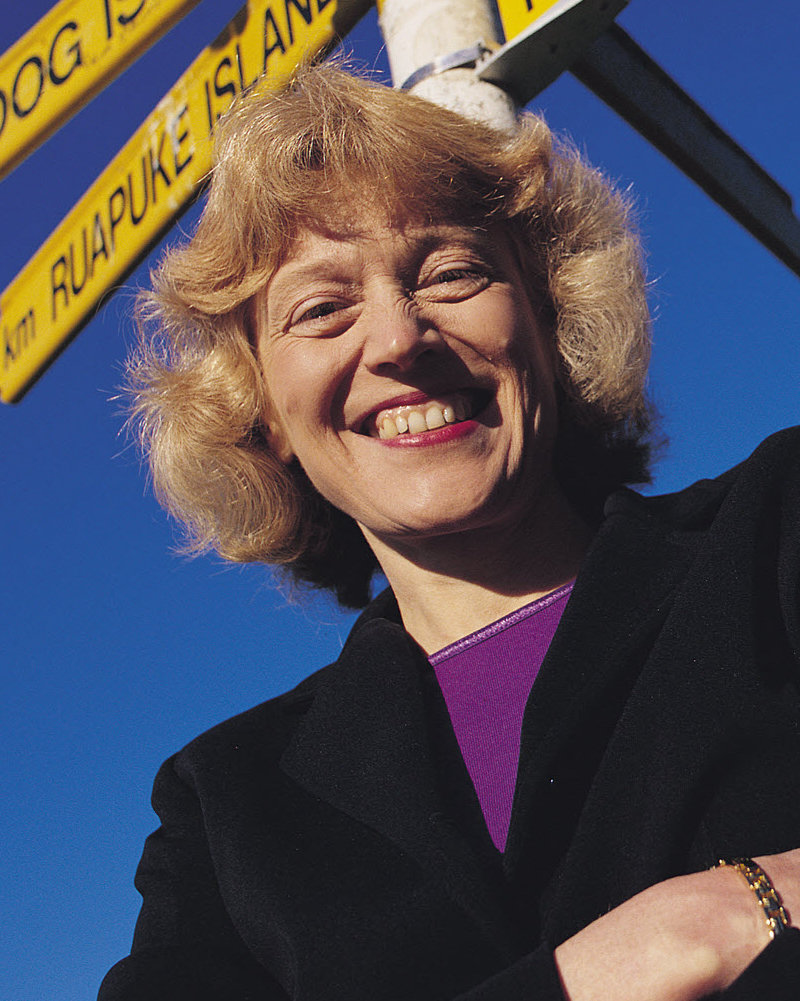
Christine French

Sally Fitzgerald

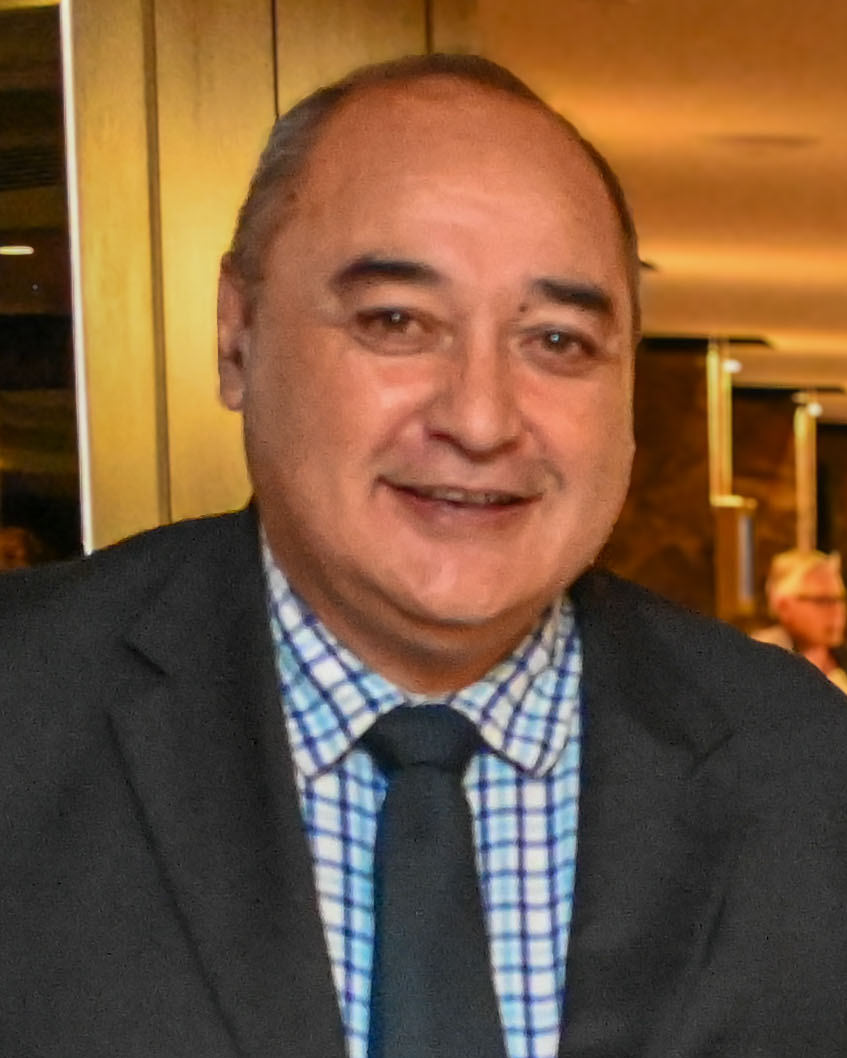
Heemi Taumaunu

=== Main centre leaders ===
- Mayor of Auckland – Wayne Brown
- Mayor of Tauranga – Mahé Drysdale
- Mayor of Hamilton – Paula Southgate, then Tim Macindoe from 19 October
- Mayor of Wellington – Tory Whanau, then Andrew Little from 17 October
- Mayor of Christchurch – Phil Mauger
- Mayor of Dunedin – Jules Radich, then Sophie Barker from 17 October
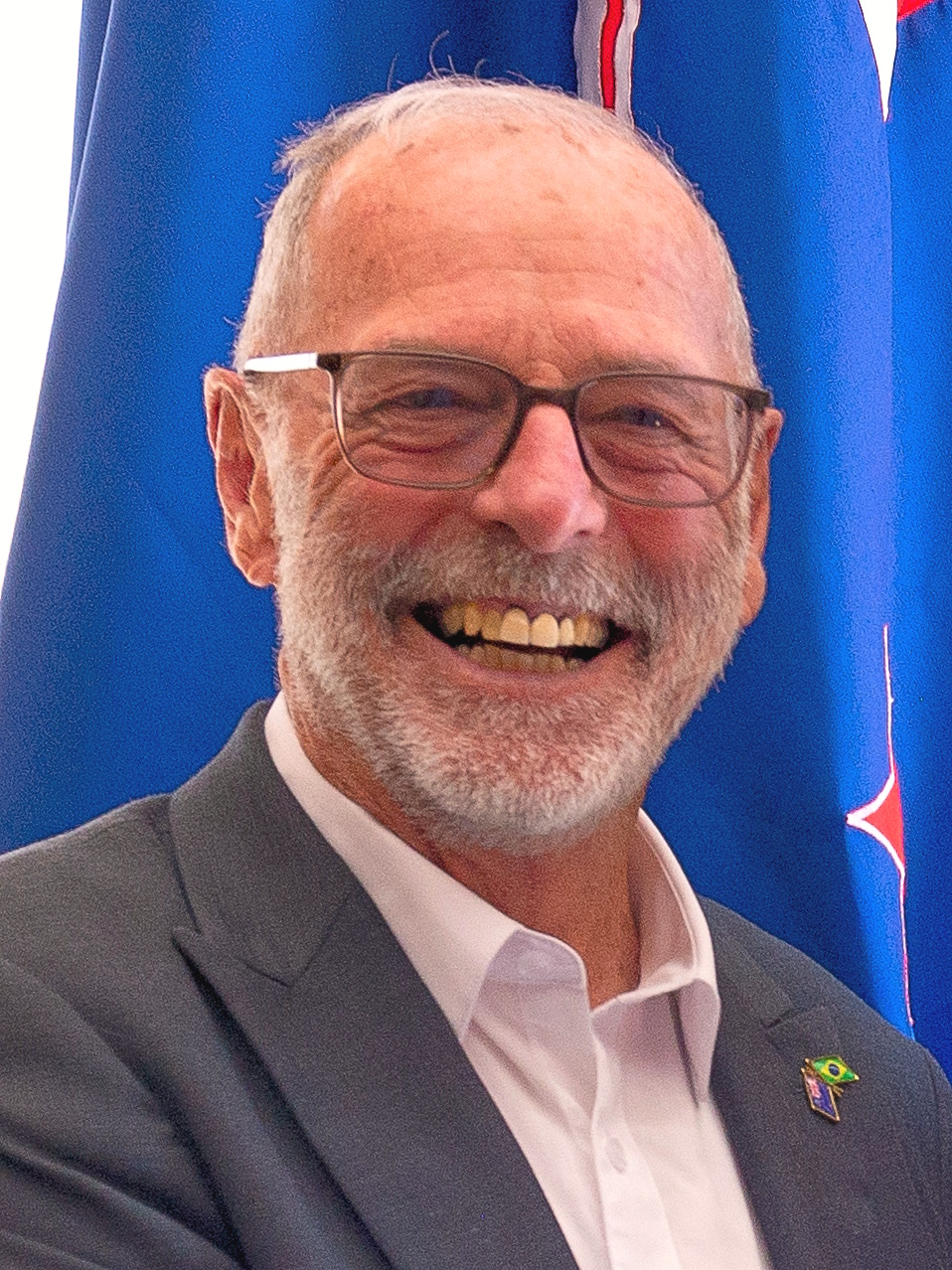
Wayne Brown

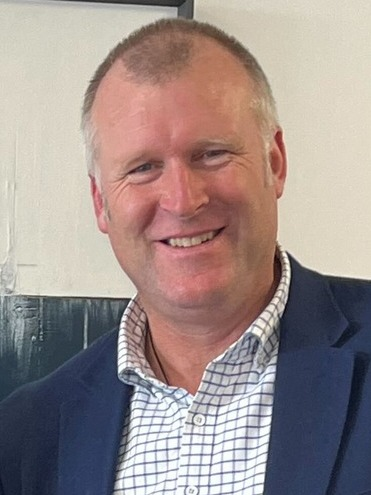
Mahé Drysdale

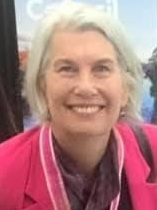
Paula Southgate

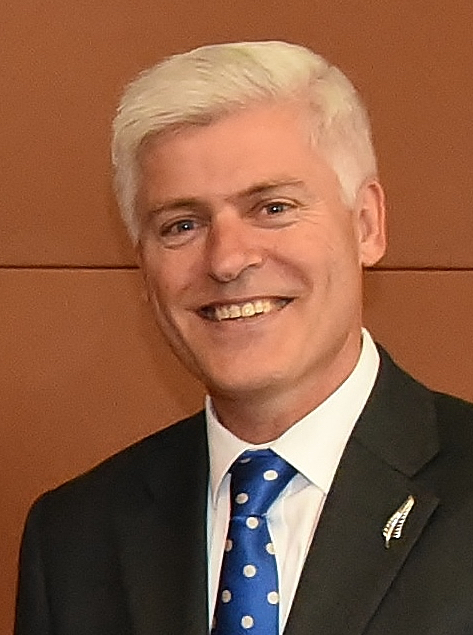
Tim Macindoe

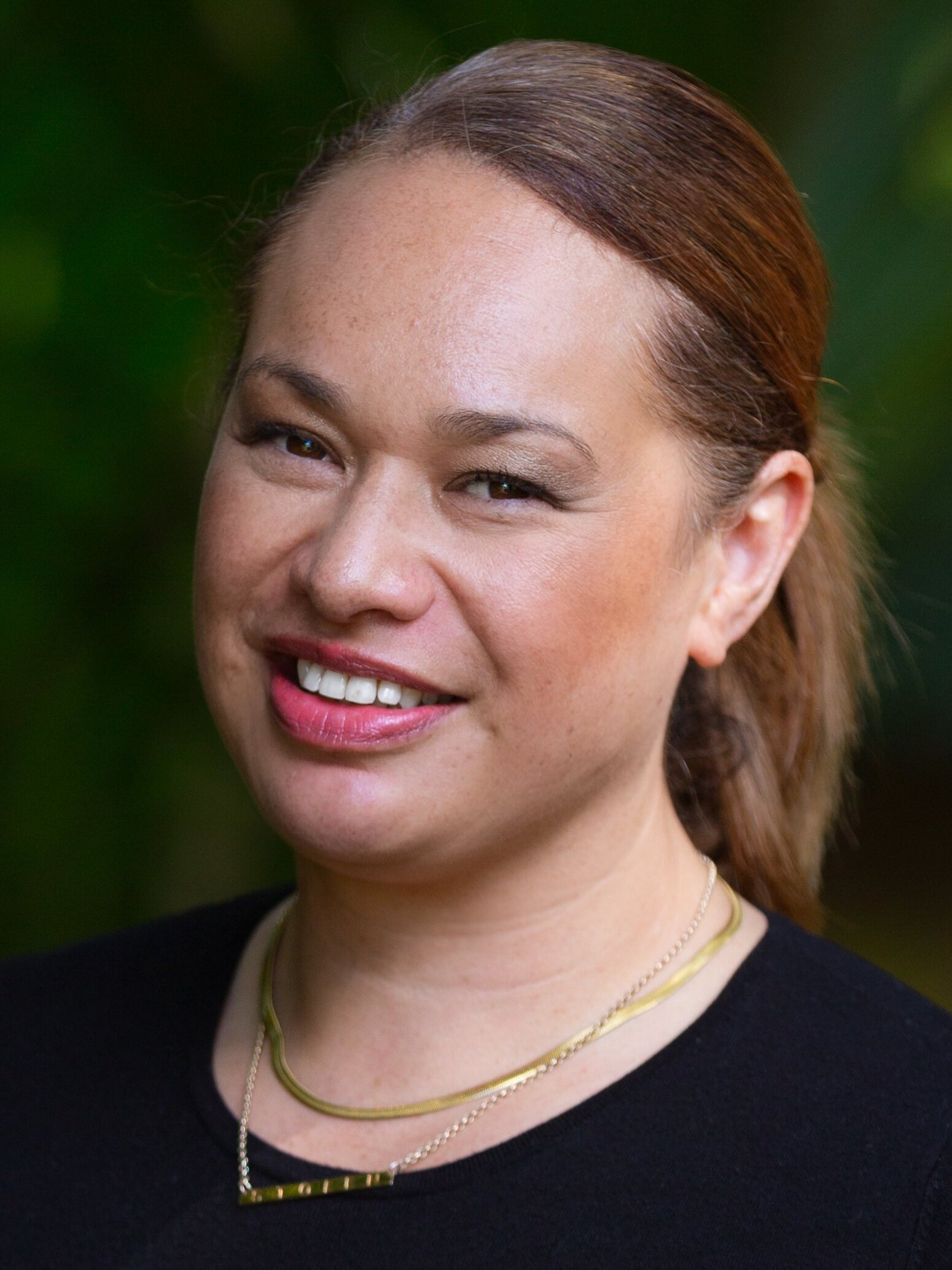
Tory Whanau

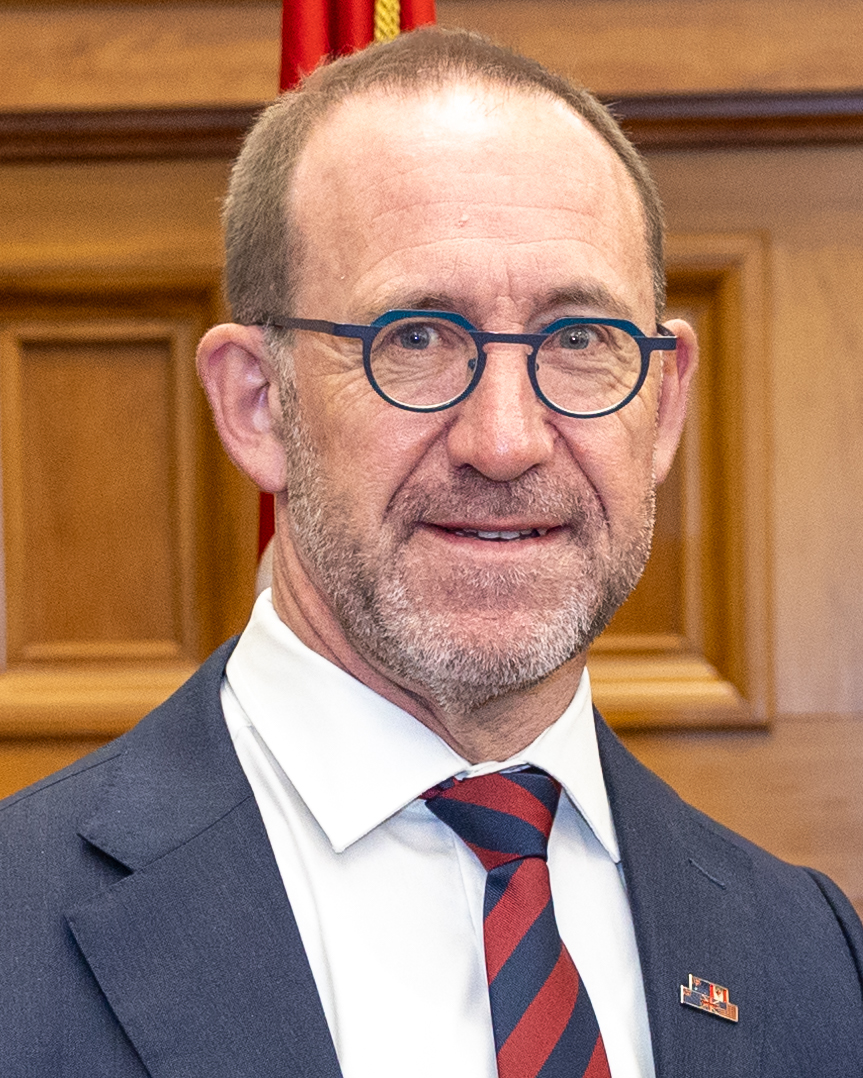
Andrew Little

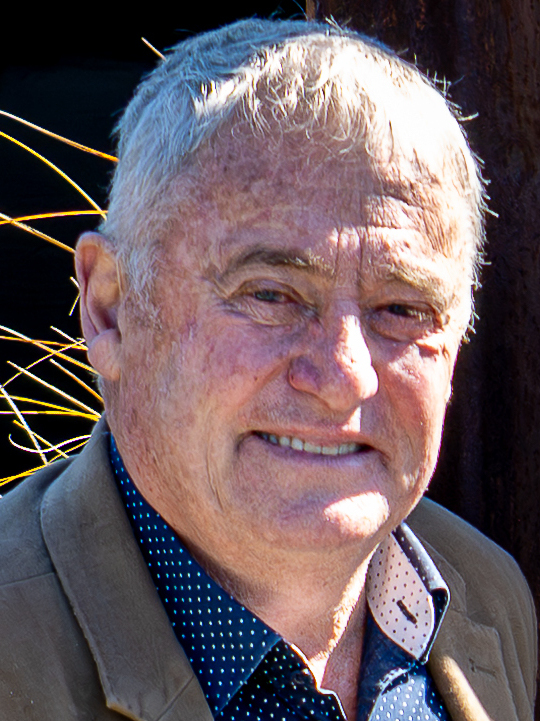
Phil Mauger

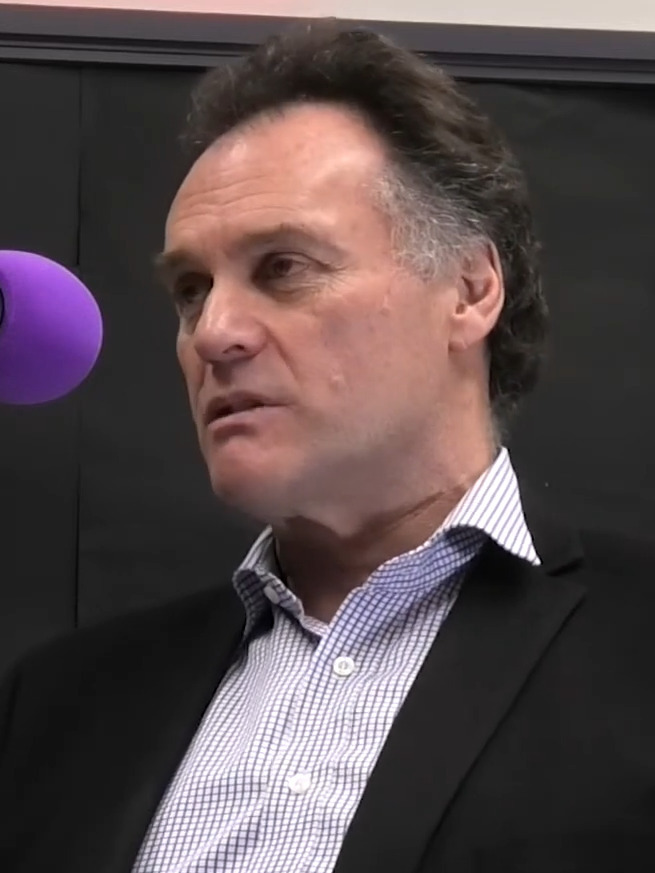
Jules Radich

== Events ==
=== January ===
- 1 January – A driver runs over two police officers on a foot patrol in Nelson, killing one and injuring the other. A 32-year-old man is arrested.
- 3 January:
  - A 32-year old man is charged with the murder of Nelson police officer Senior Sergeant Lyn Fleming.
  - Biosecurity New Zealand launches a major biosecurity operation after an oriental fruit fly is detected in South Auckland.
  - Thousands attend a vigil in Nelson for slain police officer Lyn Fleming.
  - Air New Zealand flight NZ677 from Auckland to Dunedin is cancelled due to a phone threat, affecting 170 passengers.
- 4 January – Interislander and Bluebridge cancel a total of seven ferry crossings in response to rough weather conditions in the Cook Strait.
- 5 January – Interislander and Bluebridge cancel five ferry crossings in response to continuing rough weather in the Cook Strait.
- 6 January:
  - The Desert Road closes for two months of repairs.
  - Interislander and Bluebridge suspend ferry crossings due to rough weather in the Cook Strait.
- 8 January – Over 2,070 customers in the Kaipara District experience internet outages after a digger damages the main fibre optic cable between Whangārei and Dargaville.
- 9 January:
  - In response to significant public interest, New Zealand Parliament's justice select committee extends the submission deadline for the Treaty Principles Bill to 1pm on 14 January.
  - A fire engulfs 20 hectares (49 acres) of scrubland in Whangārei, leading to the evacuation of two houses.
- 11 January – A scrub fire breaks out in Kūaotunu in the Coromandel Peninsula, consuming 36 hectares (89 acres) by the following day.
- 12 January – Mayor of Hamilton Paula Southgate announces that she would not be running for a third term during the 2025 New Zealand local elections.
- 13 January:
  - New Zealand and the United Arab Emirates sign a comprehensive economic partnership agreement, cutting tariffs on 98.5% of New Zealand exports to that country.
- 14 January – Deputy Police Commissioner Jevon McSkimming is suspended from duties due to a criminal investigation by the Independent Police Conduct Authority and the New Zealand Police.
- 16 January:
  - Hundreds including Police Commissioner Richard Chambers attend the funeral of slain Nelson Police officer Senior Sergeant Lyn Fleming.
  - Health New Zealand confirms a baby who died in November 2024 as the first death caused by whooping cough since a whooping cough epidemic was declared on 22 November 2024.
- 17 January – Minister of Māori Development Tama Potaka announces an overhaul of the Waitangi Tribunal's membership.
- 18 January:
  - A pod of about 30 whales are stranded near Pākawau in Golden Bay / Mohua, prompting a response from local iwi, the Department of Conservation(DOC) and Project Jonah.
  - A juvenile beaked whale is stranded and refloated at New Brighton, Christchurch.
- 19 January:
  - Prime Minister Christopher Luxon implements a cabinet reshuffle, resulting in the replacement of Shane Reti as health minister by Simeon Brown, and the promotion of James Meager to the new position of Minister for the South Island.
  - Three whales die after the pod of about 30 whales re-stranded at Pūponga Beach in Golden Bay despite efforts to refloat them.
- 20 January – A second pod of about 11 whales is stranded near Taupata Point in the Golden Bay.
- 21 January – DOC staff and volunteers succeed in refloating the initial pod of 30 whales and ten whales from the second pod. One of the whales from the second pod dies.
- 22 January:
  - Ten whales are re-stranded in Golden Bay, prompting a response from DOC and volunteers.
  - The Body Shop NZ goes into voluntary administration.
  - Media company NZME announces plans to cut 14 reporting and 24 production jobs as part of a restructuring process.
- 23 January:
  - DOC staff, Project Jonah and community volunteers succeed in refloating the ten stranded whales in Golden Bay.
  - Prime Minister Luxon gives his State of the Nation address. He announces that the existing Crown Research Institutes will be merged into three new Public Research Organisations and that the Government will establish a new foreign investment agency.
- 25 January – A tornado and severe storm hits Mangawhai and surrounding areas, causing two serious injuries, damage to about 50 properties and power outages affecting 4,700 homes.
- 27 January:
  - In order to attract digital nomads, a 'digital nomad' visa is announced to allow non-residents to work in New Zealand for up to nine months, given they work entirely remotely for a non-New Zealand company. The work will be untaxed for up to 90 days.
  - An outbreak of avian botulism leads to the deaths of about 1,000 birds at the Waikouaiti wastewater treatment plant near Dunedin and the Washdyke Lagoon near Timaru.
  - 27 January – New Zealand Foreign Minister Winston Peters' suspends New Zealand's aid programme to Kiribati after Kiribati President Taneti Maamau cancelled three pre-arranged meetings including one scheduled for mid January 2025. The New Zealand Government had wanted to discuss how NZ$102 million worth of aid money allocated to Kiribati between 2021 and 2024 was being spent.
- 29 January:
  - Prime Minister Luxon and Transport Minister Chris Bishop announces plans by the Government to reverse blanket speed limits on 38 sections of the New Zealand state highway network and seek public consultation on raising the speed limits for another 49 state highway sections.
  - Advocacy group Toitū te Tiriti files an urgent Waitangi Tribunal claim against proposed Regulatory Standards Bill, claiming it would undermine the Treaty of Waitangi.
- 30 January:
  - Mount Taranaki is officially recognised as a person under the name Taranaki Maunga.
  - The $130 million Queenstown Town Centre arterial road opens.
- 31 January:
  - Health Minister Simeon Brown confirms that a new Dunedin Hospital will be built on the site of the former Cadbury factory at a cost of NZ$1.9 billion.
  - A power outage affects 22,000 Transpower customers in Rotorua.
  - The Royal New Zealand Air Force formally retires its fleet of five C-130H Hercules planes.
  - Save the Children New Zealand launches a 'Boot the Bill' campaign to oppose the Government's proposed legislation establishing youth offender boot camps.

=== February ===
- 2 February – Auckland Transport raises fares on buses, trains and ferries by 5.2% and ends the 10% off-peak discount.
- 3 February – The Tāhuna Glenorchy area of Central Otago is certified a Dark Sky Sanctuary, the 23rd such designation in the world and fifth in New Zealand.
- 4 February – 900 private sector laboratory workers strike to protest poor conditions and a lack of pay parity with their public sector counterparts.
- 5 February:
  - The New Zealand Government confirms it will invest between NZ$100–150 million in upgrading State Highway 76 in Christchurch.
  - It is announced that New Zealand's unemployment rate reaches 5.1%, the highest level since September 2020.
  - Several Māori leaders and attendees protest against several government ministers including David Seymour, Paul Goldsmith and Shane Jones during a pōwhiri leading up to Waitangi Day. Seymour's speech is disrupted while Jones threatens to cut government funding to the Waitangi National Trust.
- 6 February:
  - Prime Minister Christopher Luxon attends Waitangi Day celebrations at Ngāi Tahu's Ōnuku marae in Akaroa.
  - The town hall in Roxburgh, Otago, which included the country's longest-running cinema, is destroyed by fire.
  - The former building for New Zealand's sole Jewish school "Kadimah School" is vandalised with antisemitic graffiti referencing the Gaza war.
- 7 February:
  - Health New Zealand chief executive Margie Apa resigns four months before the end of her contract.
  - Taupō experiences heavy showers and thunderstorms, resulting in surface flooding and power outages.
- 9 February – The New Zealand Government announces plans to revise the Active Investor Plus visa to attract more wealthy investors.
- 10 February:
  - Driven by "pollution, degraded waterways, and over-allocation of water", Ngāi Tahu begins proceedings in the High Court against the Crown. The tribe argues that it has never lost rangatiratanga (sovereignty, or the right to exercise authority) over freshwater, but control has been encumbered by the Crown. The Crown's argument is that it has the right to control freshwater through the Resource Management Act 1991 and other acts. The lawsuit has been given the name "Tau v AG", with historian Te Maire Tau as the lead plaintiff, and the Attorney-General (currently Judith Collins) representing the Crown.
  - ACT leader David Seymour drives a Land Rover up the New Zealand Parliament's steps as part of a fundraiser for a heart valve development programme at the University of Auckland.
  - The Director of the Public Health Agency Nicholas Jones resigns.
- 11 February – The Australian company Millari Group announces plans to acquire and reopen Juken's former Gisborne saw mill, which closed in late 2023.
- 12 February:
  - The Whangārei District Council led by Mayor Vince Cocurullo reiterates its refusal to comply with an order by Director-General of Health Diana Sarfati to fluoridate its water supply.
  - The Salvation Army releases its annual State of the Nation report, which identifies food insecurity, unaffordable housing and domestic violence against children as major issues facing New Zealand in 2025. The report also finds over 400,000 New Zealanders receiving welfare.
  - McDonald's New Zealand is denied resource consent to build a restaurant in Wānaka due to strong local opposition.
- 13 February:
  - The Public Service Association challenges Health New Zealand's proposed digital and IT job cuts, claiming they breached employment law.
  - Crown Research Institute Callaghan Innovation proposes slashing 63 jobs in response to Government plans to disestablish the organisation.
- 14 February – Director-General of Health Diana Sarfati resigns.
- 15 February:
  - A bush fire in North Canterbury causes a section of State Highway 7 to close and several homes to evacuate.
  - Members of Destiny Church's "Man Up" group disrupt a "Pride and Rainbow" event at Te Atatū's library. The church's actions were condemned by Prime Minister Luxon, Mayor of Auckland Wayne Brown, Acting Waitematā District Commander Inspector Simon Walker and Labour leader Chris Hipkins.
  - Foreign Minister Winston Peters announces that New Zealand will be considering the newly ratified Chinese–Cook Islands strategic partnership agreement in light of its national interests and constitutional relationship with the Cook Islands.
- 17 February:
  - The New Zealand Police launch an investigation into assault complaints during a protest by Destiny Church members against a rainbow event at Te Atatū's library.
  - Immigration New Zealand temporarily suspends deportation proceedings against New Zealand-born teenager Daman Kumar and his mother Sunita Devi (who both hold Indian citizenship) pending a ministerial review. Prior to a law change in 2006, babies of non-citizens born in New Zealand were entitled to New Zealand citizenship.
- 18 February:
  - Government Statistician Mark Sowden confirms he will resign on 30 March after an inquiry by the Public Service Commission into data breach allegations at Manurewa Marae in 2023 criticised Statistics New Zealand's handling of personal information and management of conflicts of interest.
  - Torrential rain leads to flash flooding in parts of Otago including Beaumont.
- 19 February:
  - The New Zealand Government establishes a NZ$2 million dual purpose fund to honour children who died in care and were buried in unmarked graves.
  - A group of abuse survivors picket the Accident Compensation Corporation's Christchurch office, demanding the company reform eligibility coverage policies for abuse survivors.
- 20 February:
  - Associate Immigration Minister Chris Penk uses his discretionary powers to grant Davan Kumar a residency visa but upholds the deportation order against his overstayer parents.
  - Australian and New Zealand Defence Ministers Richard Marles and Judith Collins confirm that the Australian and New Zealand Defence Forces are monitoring three Chinese warships that are sailing through international waters near Sydney.
  - New Zealand Media and Entertainment confirms plans to layoff several senior reporters and create a new Free ad-supported streaming television (FAST) channel.
- 21 February:
  - Flights between Australia and New Zealand are diverted after the Chinese Navy conducts live fire drills using warships 340 nautical miles east of Sydney, in international waters. The drills continued the following day and were closely monitored by the militaries of both Australia and New Zealand.
  - The New Zealand Government allocates NZ$200 million of funding for the City Rail Link to removing level crossings in order to ease traffic congestion in Auckland.
  - Andrew Bayly resigns as Minister of Commerce and Consumer Affairs after he "placed a hand" on a staff member's upper arm on 18 February, in what Bayly acknowledges as "overbearing" behavior.
- 22 February:
  - Police investigate five suspected overnight church arson attempts in Masterton.
  - Chinese warships conduct a second live firing exercise in the Tasman Sea. Prime Minister Luxon confirms that Australian and New Zealand naval forces including HMNZS Te Kaha are monitoring the Chinese vessels.
- 23 February:
  - LGBT supporters gather in Auckland's Albert Park to protest against Destiny Church's disruption of Pride events on 15 February.
  - The New Zealand Police confirm they are investigating graffiti at the former location of Auckland's Kadimah School, which was discovered on 6 February.
- 24 February – The Police confirmed they have seized 76 gang patches and filed 337 charges for alleged insignia breaches under the Gangs Act 2024.
- 25 February:
  - Immigration Minister Erica Stanford announces the Government will ease residency rules to recruit more primary school teachers from overseas.
  - Executive director Helen Potiki and legal counsels Nick Whittington and Kristy McDonald KC resign from the second phase of the Royal Commission of Inquiry into COVID-19 Lessons Learned.
- 26 February:
  - A wildfire engulfs over 70 hectares of land near Waipoua Settlement, leading to the evacuation of local residents.
  - Justice Minister Paul Goldsmith and Associate Justice Minister Nicole McKee confirm the Government will introduce legislation expanding citizen's arrest powers that they claim will combat retail crime.
  - Foreign Minister Winston Peters met with Chinese Foreign Minister Wang Yi to raise concerns about Chinese naval exercises in the Tasman Sea.
  - Police confirm they have issued a warrant to arrest a 44-year old man in connection with the arson of four Masterton churches on 22 February.
- 27 February – The New Zealand Government confirms it will introduce legislation to extend the parliamentary term from three to four years, subject to a referendum.
- 28 February:
  - High Court Justice Simon Moore quashes Whakaari Management Limited's conviction for its role in the 2019 Whakaari / White Island eruption.
  - Sarah Fitt resigns as chief executive of state pharmaceutical agency Pharmac.
  - Oranga Tamariki workers affiliated with Public Service Association launch a seven-week strike avoiding double shifts, being on-call, and working overtime to protest unsatisfactory pay and work conditions.

=== March ===
- 1 March – A thousand people attended a Pride march in Christchurch to mark the start of the month-long Christchurch Pride 2025 festival. A group of Destiny Church counter-demonstrators protest during a performance by drag performer Georgie Lush.
- 3 March:
  - The New Zealand Government announces a two-year primary care programme targeting 100 extra overseas-trained doctors to address a national shortage of doctors.
  - Anti-war protesters from Peace Action Ōtautahi climb onto the roof of armaments multinational company NIOA's New Zealand headquarters in Christchurch.
  - Water infrastructure company Wellington Water releases a critical report revealing poor financial practices, poor oversight of consultants and contractors and an alleged incident of theft.
- 4 March:
  - The Commerce Commission launches an investigation into allegations of "potential unlawful conduct" by Wellington Water contractors.
  - The Ministry for Primary Industries launches an investigation into School Lunch Collective meals after children were served meals with melted plastic packaging.
- 5 March:
  - Richard Prebble resigns from the Waitangi Tribunal, citing disagreements over the interpretation of the Treaty of Waitangi.
  - Adrian Orr resigns as Governor of the Reserve Bank of New Zealand.
- 6 March:
  - Foreign Minister Winston Peters sacks New Zealand High Commissioner to the United Kingdom Phil Goff over remarks criticising US President Donald Trump.
  - Health Minister Simeon Brown confirms the Government would lower the bowel screening eligibility age range from 60 to 58 years, using funding from a cancelled pilot programme established by the previous Labour government to lower the eligibility age for Māori and Pasifika New Zealanders from 60 to 50 years.
  - Air New Zealand CEO Greg Foran announces that he will resign from his position effective 20 October.
- 7 March:
  - New Zealand Labour Party leader Chris Hipkins announces a cabinet reshuffle of his shadow cabinet during his State of the Nation speech.
  - Health Minister Simeon Brown announces a major overhaul of Health New Zealand including reinstating its leadership board, decentralisation and promoting private-public partnership.
- 8 March:
  - A Pride parade is held in Wellington, with Mayor of Wellington Tory Whanau and actor Karen O'Leary attending. About 30 Destiny Church Man Up protesters stage a counter-protest. Police separate the two groups.
  - A total fire ban comes into force in the Northland Region from 12am midnight in response to persistent dry, hot and windy conditions.
- 11 March – School lunch provider Libelle Group goes into liquidation, affecting 500 staff. The company had been contracted by the Compass Group to provide 125,000 meals to the Government's "Ka Ora, Ka Ako" school meal programme.
- 12 March:
  - Camilla Belich's Crimes (Theft By Employer) Amendment Bill passes its third reading in Parliament with the support of the Labour, Green, Te Pāti Māori and New Zealand First.
  - Minister for Economic Growth Nicola Willis proposes scrapping several procurement rules including the Living Wage requirement for government contracts. She also proposes a new economic benefits test for both government services and building contracts.
  - The Whanganui District Council scraps its food scraps collection service in response to local opposition.
- 13 March – The New Zealand Government hosts a two-day Infrastructure Investment Summit in Auckland with the goal of attracting international investment from foreign sovereign funds and multinational companies. Protesters from various groups including ActionStation picket the summit's premises at Park Hyatt.
- 14 March:
  - Compass Group confirms it will acquire the assets of the bankrupt Libelle Group food catering service.
  - State Highway 1 Desert Road reopens after two months of repairs.
- 17 March:
  - The Whangārei District Council rescinds its decision in November 2024 to defy a Government directive to fluoridate its water supply, pending a High Court injunction on the matter expected to be released on 18 March.
  - A 14-year-old youth is convicted of the manslaughter of Dunedin teenager Enere McLaren-Taana in May 2024.
- 19 March – The blobfish (Psychrolutes microporos) is named the 2025 New Zealand Fish of the Year.
- 20 March – The 2025 New Zealander of the Year Awards are announced, with women's health academic Bev Lawton named New Zealander of the Year.
- 21 March:
  - Wellington High Court Justice Jason McHerron dismisses a judicial review against Cuba Street's rainbow crossing.
  - The New Zealand Defence Force proposes disestablishing 697 civilian roles as part of a restructuring process.
- 23 March:
  - Hundreds of protesters gather outside the New Zealand Parliament to protest against the Government's plans to review the prescription of puberty blockers in "gender affirming care."
  - New Zealand First leader and Deputy Prime Minister Winston Peters delivers a state of the nation speech at the James Hay Theatre in Christchurch, focusing on alleged wokeism and DEI issues. The event is picketed by both pro and anti-greyhound racing, pro-Palestinian and pro-Israel protesters. Police arrest 10 individuals for disrupting the event.
- 25 March:
  - The High Court rejects the Whangārei District Council's bid to challenge the Director-General of Health's order to fluoridate its water supply.
  - A magnitude 6.8 earthquake hits off the coast of Southland, producing a 10 cm (3.9 in)-tsunami. Cracks in the Dunedin Gasworks Museum were later found and may have been caused by the earthquake.
  - The Tararua District Council issues a boil water notice in Woodville after rodent feces were found in the rafters of the town's reservoir building.
- 26 March:
  - Queenstown residents protest against a decision by the Queenstown Lakes District Council to discharge treated sewage into the Shotover River.
  - Mental Health Minister Matt Doocey acknowledges that Police accidentally sent an 11-year old autistic girl to a mental institution following a case of mistaken identity. The girl received at least two doses of anti-psychotic medicine.
- 29 March – A light aircraft crashes near Wānaka, killing one person.
- 31 March:
  - Minister for Rail Winston Peters releases details of the two new Interislander replacement ferries, which come with rail emplacements.
  - The New Zealand Crown settles a Treaty of Waitangi claim with Ngāti Hāua following eight years of negotiations. Treaty Negotiations Minister Paul Goldsmith apologises for historical wrongs at Ngāpūwaiwaha Marae in Taumarunui.

=== April ===
- 1 April:
  - The minimum wage rises by 1.5% from $23.15 to $23.50. In addition, training and starting wages rise to $18.80.
  - The Queenstown Lakes District Council strips Councillor Niki Gladding of her roles after she leaked plans by the Council to dump treated effluent into the Shotover River.
- 3 April – The New Zealand Parliament passes legislation repealing Section 7AA of the Oranga Tamariki Act 1989, which requires Oranga Tamariki (the Ministry of Children) to work in partnership with Māori iwi (tribes) and hapū (sub-groups).
- 4 April:
  - The Financial Markets Authority commences civil proceedings against insurance company IAG New Zealand for overcharging about 239,000 customers $35 million by incorrectly pricing premiums over the past two decades.
  - The New Zealand Parliament's Justice select committee recommends that the ACT party's contentious Treaty Principles Bill not proceed further following substantial public feedback.
  - The Royal New Zealand Navy's court of inquiry concludes that a series of human errors led to the sinking of HMNZS Manawanui (2019) in early October 2024.
- 6 April – Several Greenpeace New Zealand protesters occupy part of Port Taranaki to prevent an Indonesian ship carrying palm kernel from unloading. Police arrest four protesters.
- 7 April:
  - A bomb threat leads to the disruption of proceedings at the Wellington and Palmerston North district courts.
  - Defence Minister Judith Collins announces that the New Zealand Government will be investing NZ$12 billion in the New Zealand Defence Force over the next four years to raise defence spending to over 2 percent of GDP.
  - Australian outdoor media company QMS acquires Oaktree Capital Management's 45 percent stake in Mediaworks New Zealand, gaining full control of the commercial radio company.
- 8 April:
  - A tornado in Levin causes roofs to blow off houses, and trees and fences to fall over.
  - Labour Member of Parliament David Parker announces he will retire from Parliament, effective next month.
  - Climate Change Minister Simon Watts confirms that the New Zealand Government will shut down its green investment bank New Zealand Green Investment Finance.
- 9 April – The Grey District Council issues a boil water notice after coliforms were found in the water supply zones of Stillwater, Cobden, and Kaiata, and Escherichia coli was detected in Kaiata.
- 10 April – The New Zealand Parliament votes 112–11 to reject the Treaty Principles Bill.
- 11 April:
  - Veterans Minister Chris Penk announces that the New Zealand Government will expand the legal definition of veterans and create a new national veterans day.
  - Foreign Minister Winston Peters confirms plans to ease visa requirements for visitors from Pacific Islands Forum member states in July and November 2025.
- 16 April:
  - The Otago and Southland Regions experience Internet and mobile outages after fibre optic cables are damaged by rodents and a contractor by accident.
  - A fire near Paremata railway station in Porirua disrupts the Kāpiti Line.
  - Cyclone Tam causes significant power outages in Northland and leads to the cancellation of flights and ferry services in Auckland.
- 17 April – Cyclone Tam causes over 6,000 properties in Northland, the Coromandel Peninsula, Bay of Plenty and Gisborne to lose power overnight.
- 18 April – Cyclone Tam causes flooding to roads and highways in the Coromandel Peninsula. Flooding and strong-winds are also reported in the Far North District, leading to road closures and flight disruptions.
- 19 April – Cyclone Tam causes flooding, thunderstorms and travel disruptions in Auckland. Local authorities issue an emergency alert.
- 20 April:
  - Auckland authorities issue a second emergency alert in response to flooding and thunderstorms caused by Cyclone Tam.
  - 70 protesters affiliated with the Happy Valley Coalition occupy a fast-tracked coal mine on the Denniston Plateau near Westport.
- 21 April – Cyclone Tam begins easing, despite heavy rain and thunderstorms across New Zealand. Power companies work on restoring power to Northland homes. The Auckland Council inspects 16 flood-damaged properties.
- 22 April – Power companies restore power to most houses in Northland, with 25 Far North homes remaining disconnected.
- 23 April – Police remove the last remaining protesters from a coal mine in the Denniston Plateau. Seven people were charged with trespassing while three were arrested.
- 24 April – A fire breaks out at a recycling plant in the Wairau Valley in Auckland's North Shore, causing significant damage including a chemical spill contaminating several beaches in the North Shore.
- 28 April:
  - Education Minister Erica Stanford announces that the New Zealand Government will invest $53 million in covering teachers' registration and practising certificate fees over the next three years.
  - The Ministry for Primary Industries lifts biosecurity restrictions at a Mainland Poultry farm in Otago where the H7N6 avian influenza strain was detected in late 2024.
- 29 April:
  - Mayor of Wellington Tory Whanau confirms she will not contest the 2025 Wellington mayoral election and endorses Andrew Little.
  - Fonterra confirms it will close its Hamilton canning and packing facility in July 2025, affecting 120 jobs.
- 30 April:
  - New Zealand–Philippines relations: Defence Minister Judith Collins signs a visiting forces agreement with her Philippine counterpart, Gilbert Teodoro, in Manila.
  - Education Minister Erica Stanford and Finance Minister Nicola Willis confirm that the NZ Government will introduce financial literacy into the primary school curriculum from 2027.
  - Justice Minister Paul Goldsmith announces that the NZ Government will reinstate a blanket ban on prisoners voting.

=== May ===
- 1 May:
  - 5,000 senior doctors affiliated with the Association of Salaried Medical Specialists strike in response to a pay dispute with national health service Health New Zealand.
  - States of emergency are declared in Selwyn District, Christchurch and Banks Peninsula due to flooding and landslides, amid poor weather affecting most of the country. About a thousand properties in Wellington experience power outages. Most flights to and from the city are cancelled, and so are Cook Strait ferry crossings. Wind gusts in the city reach up to 150 km/h.
- 2 May – The state of emergency is lifted in the Selwyn District. States of emergency remain in effect in Christchurch and Banks Peninsula.
- 3 May – 400 protesters gather in Dunedin's Octagon to protest against the New Zealand First party's member's bill defining women and men based on their sexual biology.
- 6 May – The Commerce Commission files criminal charges against supermarket giant Woolworths for alleged inaccurate pricing and misleading discounts.
- 7 May:
  - Convicted murderer Mark Lundy is released on parole after serving 23 years of a life sentence for the murders of his wife Christine and daughter Amber in August 2000.
  - The New Zealand Government ends the requirement for overseas visitors to provide certified translations of supporting documents in a bid to boost tourism.
  - The New Zealand Parliament passes urgent legislation raising the threshold for making pay equity claims. As a result, 33 claims representing thousands of workers have to be dropped and refiled.
- 9 May – Protesters gather in several centres including Auckland, Dunedin, Christchurch, Rolleston and New Plymouth to protest against the Government's new Pay Equality Amendment Act 2025.
- 10 May – Protest against the Government's new Pay Equity legislation are held in Nelson and Ōtaki.
- 11 May – The Christchurch City Council extends the state of emergency in Banks Peninsula in response to a landslip in Akaroa.
- 12 May:
  - Mayor of Christchurch Phil Mauger lifts Banks Peninsula's local state of emergency.
  - Deputy Police Commissioner Jevon McSkimming resigns following a four-month Police and Independent Police Conduct Authority investigation into serious misconduct including pornography being found on a Police-issued device.
- 14 May – A parliamentary committee approves a motion against Te Pāti Māori MPs Hana-Rāwhiti Maipi-Clarke, Rawiri Waititi and Debbie Ngarewa-Packer censuring and banning them from entering the parliamentary buildings for up to 21 days for their performance of a haka against their opponents during a parliamentary debate over the Treaty Principles Bill.
- 15 May – The New Zealand Government apologises to the Māori iwi Ngāti Ranginui for land confiscations and a scorched earth campaign during the New Zealand Wars. Parliament also passes legislation compensating the tribe NZ$38 million and designating 15 sites of significances to the tribe.
- 16 May:
  - The USS Blue Ridge visited Wellington to reaffirm bilateral relations with New Zealand. This marked the first visit to Wellington by a US warship since 2021.
  - The Waitangi Tribunal releases an interim report urging the New Zealand Crown to halt work on the proposed Regulatory Standards Bill and to engage in "meaningful consultation" with Māori.
  - Deputy Prime Minister Winston Peters, Regional Development Minister Shane Jones, Labour Party MP Ingrid Leary attend a reopening ceremony at Hillside Engineering. Pro-Palestine, transgender rights, pay equity and climate change protesters picket the event.
- 20 May:
  - Foreign Minister Winston Peters joins 22 other foreign ministers and the European Union in calling on Israel to allow a full resumption of aid to the Gaza Strip.
  - Two groups of protesters gather outside the New Zealand Parliament to call for the NZ Government to lower the bowel cancer screening age and oppose the suspension of three Te Pāti Māori MPs.
  - The New Zealand Parliament votes to postpone a debate on the Privileges Committee's decision to suspend three Te Pāti Māori MPs until 5 June, allowing them to participate in an upcoming debate around the 2025 New Zealand budget.
- 22 May:
  - Finance Minister Nicola Willis releases the 2025 New Zealand budget.
  - The Wellington City Council votes to preserve the historic Begonia House and Khandallah Pool, while making cutbacks in transport infrastructure and renovations to Wellington Zoo. The Council also introduces parking fees for motorcycles in the Wellington CBD.
- 23 May – The New Zealand Geographic Board and Land Information Minister Chris Penk decline a proposal by the Kororāreka Marae Society to rename Russell to its Māori language name "Kororāreka".
- 24 May – Three crew members are injured in an engine room explosion aboard a ship berthed in Bluff.
- 26 May:
  - Two of the New Zealand Government's "non-financial benefit sanctions" come into force: namely money management payment cards and community work experience activities.
  - Heavy rain leads to flooding in Nelson and Westport.
- 27 May:
  - Police Commissioner Richard Chambers overturns a directive from March 2025 instructing Police officers not to investigate "lower value" thefts, petrol drive-offs, shoplifting and fraud crimes.
  - The Department of Conservation proposes axing 84 jobs to meet a Government directive for a 6.5 percent reduction in spending.
- 28 May:
  - Health Minister Simeon Brown and Finance Minister Nicola Willis announce that the Government will invest in 126 additional beds and treatment spaces at Wellington Hospital.
  - Anti-mining protesters picket ANZ Bank branches in Dunedin and other centres to protest against the bank's relationship with coal company Bathurst Resources, which has applied for a fast-track consent to mine the Denniston Plateau.
- 29 May:
  - The Transport Accident Investigation Commission (TAIC) launches an explosion into a boiler room explosion aboard a ship berthed in Bluff that occurred on 24 May.
  - A car crash causes a power outage and traffic disruption in Rotorua's Pukehangi suburb.
- 30 May:
  - Police launch a review into how many cases of retail crime were filed after the rescindment of a controversial directive directing the Police not to investigate lower-value retail crimes.
  - 50 pay equity protesters picket a post-budget business lunch featuring Finance Minister Nicola Willis outside the Addington Raceway event centre.
  - Accident Compensation Corporation chair Tracey Batten resigns effective immediately,
  - Four separate ruptures to Dargaville's water pipeline causes disruptions to the town's water supply.

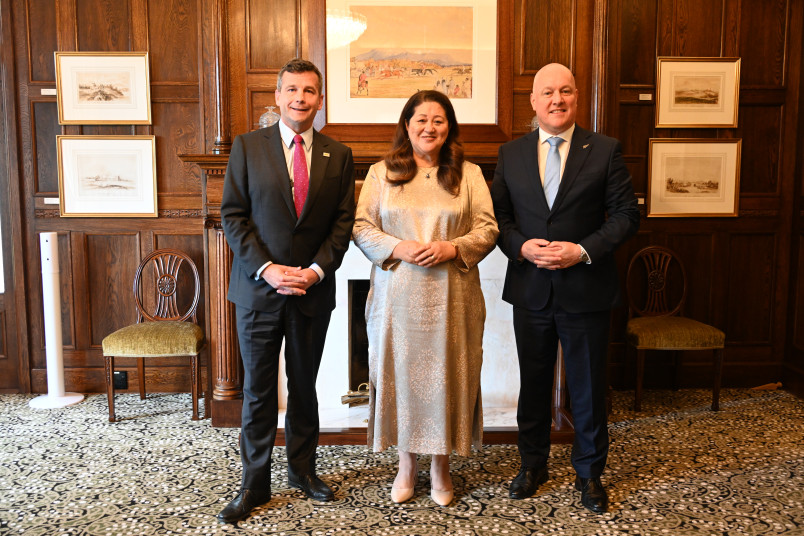
David Seymour (left), after being sworn in as deputy prime minister at Government House, Auckland, with the governor-general, Dame Cindy Kiro (centre), and the prime minister, Christopher Luxon

- 31 May:
  - David Seymour succeeds Winston Peters as deputy prime minister, under the terms of the coalition agreement in 2023.
  - Strong winds cause power outages in parts of Otago and the Southland Region.

=== June ===
- 1 June – Mark Rocket becomes the first New Zealander to reach space after flying on the Blue Origin NS-32 suborbital spaceflight.
- 2 June:
  - The 2025 King's Birthday Honours are announced. Notable recipients include comedian Dai Henwood, Suzy Cato, Louise Wallace and Jude Dobson.
  - Australian mining company Siren Gold is granted a permit to explore gold and antimony in the Marlborough Sounds.
- 3 June:
  - Online retailer Trade Me acquires a 50 percent stake in media company Stuff's Stuff Digital division.
  - Former National Party minister and MP Steven Joyce becomes chair of media company NZME's board while Canadian billionaire Jim Grenon becomes the company's director following a board meeting.
  - The 90,000 Pawprint Petition calling for a ban on the public sale of fireworks is presented to the New Zealand Parliament.
  - WorkSafe New Zealand launches a new road cone online tipline.
  - The Kaipara District Council confirms that Dargaville's water supply pipeline is fully repaired following four days of disruptions caused by four separate ruptures.
- 4 June – The navigation radar of HMAS Canberra's accidentally disrupts Internet service and radio signals over a large area spanning Taranaki in the North Island to the Marlborough District in the South Island. When made aware, Canberra's crew changed her systems to non-interfering frequencies.
- 5 June:
  - Police charged three individuals with manslaughter in relation to the Loafers Lodge fire.
  - Parliament votes to suspend Te Pāti Māori MPs Hana-Rāwhiti Maipi-Clarke for seven days, Rawiri Waititi and Debbie Ngarewa-Packer for 21 days for their performance of a haka against their opponents during a parliamentary debate over the Treaty Principles Bill.
  - Michael Forbes, the deputy press secretary to Prime Minister Christopher Luxon, resigns after being accused of illegally photographing, filming and recording women including sex workers.
- 6 June:
  - Damage to one of Chorus Limited's ethernet routers causes widespread Internet outages in Wellington and parts of the lower North Island.
  - The SkyCity Entertainment Group sues Fletcher Building and Fletcher Construction for NZ$330 million on the grounds that the companies had breached their contract to build the New Zealand International Convention Centre at SkyCity Auckland within three years. The Fletcher Group has confirmed they would contest the lawsuit.
- 10 June — Lawyers for Climate Action NZ and the Environmental Law Initiative sue the New Zealand Government at the Wellington High Court over its allegedly "dangerously inadequate" plan to reduce carbon emissions to net zero by 2050.
- 11 June:
  - Te Ahu a Turanga – Manawatū Tararua Highway opens to all traffic, after a formal opening ceremony on 7 June.
  - A tornado-like squall causes power outages in the Taranaki region.
  - The New Zealand government joins the British, Australian, Canadian and Norwegian governments in imposing travel bans on Israeli National Security Minister Itamar Ben-Gvir and Finance Minister Bezalel Smotrich for allegedly inciting "extremist violence" against Palestinians in the West Bank.
  - The National Library of New Zealand confirms it will destroy 500,000 unwanted books after US publishers challenged its plans to sell the collection to the online archive Internet Archive.
  - The Aratere experiences an electrical fault at 8:50pm, delaying a night-time voyage from Picton to Wellington.
- 13 June:
  - Tingjun Cao is sentenced to life imprisonment with a minimum term of 17 years for the murder of Christchurch real estate agent Yanfei Bao.
  - A fire in Lyttelton destroys two properties, damages a third and leads to the evacuation of local residents.
  - Police seize 478 firearms in Gore, marking one of the largest firearms seizures in New Zealand history.
- 15 June – Auckland department store Smith & Caughey's closes its Queen Street store, ending 145 years of trading.
- 17 June:
  - A ban of the distribution, manufacture, sale and supply of disposable vapes, and new restrictions on advertising and promotion of vaping products, come into effect.
  - New World's Victoria Park supermarket in Auckland experiences significant damage during a massive fire.
  - The Sentencing (Reinstating Three Strikes) Amendment Act 2024 comes into force, applying to 42 serious crimes including homicides, sexual assault, aggravated robbery, abduction, strangulation and suffocation.
- 18 June:
  - The New Zealand Government announces the scrapping of the five-yearly national census.
  - The Māori iwi (tribe) Te Patutokotoko files legal action against Conservation Minister Tama Potaka and the Department of Conservation for not consulting them about granting ten-year concessions to Whakapapa Holdings Limited and Pure Tūroa to run the Tūroa and Whakapapa skifields.
  - New World's Victoria Park supermarket in Auckland is extensively damaged during a major fire.
- 19 June – The New Zealand Government confirms it suspended NZ$20 million of core sector support funding to the Cook Islands in early June 2025 in retaliation for the Cook Islands government signing a partnership agreement with China without consulting New Zealand, per the requirements of their free association relationship.
- 20 June
  - Prime Minister Christopher Luxon meets with Chinese President Xi Jinping in Beijing to discuss strengthening bilateral tourism, education and agricultural trade.
  - The New Zealand Symphony Orchestra announces simultaneously the scheduled conclusion of the tenure of Gemma New as its artistic director and principal conductor in 2027, and the appointment of André de Ridder as its new music director, effective in 2027.
- 21 June – Brian Tamaki's Destiny Church stages a march in Auckland's Aotea Square opposing the spread of non-Christian religions and immigration in New Zealand. Destiny Church's actions are denounced by Minister for Ethnic Communities Mark Mitchell.
- 24 June – Dunedin Airport receives its first international flight—a Jetstar flight from Gold Coast Airport—since the start of the COVID-19 pandemic in 2020.
- 25 June – Nelson Hospital switches from coal to landfill gas as part of a nationwide decarbonisation shift.
- 26 June:
  - A state of emergency is declared in the Wairau-Awatere Ward of Marlborough due to heavy rain.
  - 32 Māori land trusts (representing over 150,000 landowners, hapu (sub-groups) and iwi (tribes) file legal proceedings against the New Zealand Crown at the High Court urging the Government to stop the degradation of fresh water, honour the Treaty of Waitangi and Māori rights over water and geothermal resources.
  - The New Zealand Government passed legislation designating the Independent Children's Monitor as an independent Crown entity, dissolving the Children and Young People's Commission and reinstating the Children's Commissioner.
- 27 June:
  - A state of emergency is declared in Nelson and Tasman due to heavy rain and flooding . Residents of parts of Spring Creek are asked to evacuate in response to concerns that heavy overnight rain could cause the Wairau River to flood.
  - New Zealand First list Member of Parliament Tanya Unkovich resigns to concentrate on work in the private sector.
- 28 June – A tornado in Waitara damages 11 homes.
- 29 June — The Government's sentencing reforms, which reduces sentencing discounts and encourages cumulative sentencing, comes into effect.
- 30 June – Oji Fibre Solutions ceases paper production operations at its Kinleith Mill in Tokoroa, affecting 230 jobs.

=== July ===
- 1 July:
  - The Government's Healthy Homes standards come into effect, parental leave payments increase, Jobseeker welfare beneficiaries will need to reapply every six months, the Government's KiwiSaver contributions drop from 50 cents to 25 cents per dollar, ACC payments increase by 2.89%, and public transport fares rise nationwide.
  - Farms will be required to keep raw milk records in order to combat the spread of mycoplasma bovis.
  - The weight loss drug Semaglutide (Wegovy) becomes available in New Zealand.
  - Justice Minister Paul Goldsmith and Associate Justice Minister Nicole McKee announce several tougher penalties that they claim will combat shoplifting.
- 2 July — The New Zealand Space Agency confirms that contact with the emissions-monitoring satellite MethaneSAT had been lost on 20 June and that recovery was unlikely. The New Zealand Government had contributed NZ$29 million to the US-based Environmental Defense Fund's MethaneSAT, which was tasked with monitoring oil and gas emissions.
- 3 July:
  - Goldsmith and McKee announce longer periods and fines for trespassing.
  - Local authorities extended the state of emergency in Nelson, Tasman and Marlborough for another seven days in response to forecast heavy rain.
  - A severed fiber-optic cable causes mobile phone and power outages in Golden Bay, Tasman.
  - A line fault causes power outages to 2,000 properties in the Selwyn District including Rolleston and Templeton.
  - Torrential rain leads to flooding, landslips, sewage overflows and evacuations in parts of Taranaki including New Plymouth. Significant flooding is reported in Ōkato, Egmont Village, New Zealand State Highway 3, and Eltham. New Plymouth's sewage system is also inundated.
- 4 July – Defence Minister Judith Collins announces the reactivation of No. 62 Squadron RNZAF as the New Zealand Defence Force's first dedicated space force unit.
- 10 July – Civil defence authorities declare a pre-emptive state of emergency in Nelson-Tasman in response to MetService's orange heavy rain warning for the region.
- 11 July:
  - A 14-year-old boy is sentenced to three years and three months in prison for the killing of Enere McLaren-Taana.
  - MetService issues a red heavy rain warning in parts of the Tasman District in response to heavy rain and flooding. 100 homes are evacuated due to flooding.
  - MetService also issues orange heavy rain warnings in the Northland Region, Auckland Region, Waikato and Coromandel Peninsula.
- 12 July — MetService lifts weather warnings for much of the country except the Westland ranges. Hundreds of households in the Tasman District and Banks peninsula experience weather-related power cuts.
- 15 July — The Commerce Commission files civil proceedings against Foodstuffs North Island and its subsidiary Gilmours for alleged cartel conduct.
- 16 July — Education Minister Erica Stanford announces that the New Zealand Government will be ending open-plan class rooms in favour of single-cell classrooms.
- 18 July — The Gore District Council issues a directive not to drink tap water in Gore due to high nitrate levels.
- 21 July:
  - Health Minister Simeon Brown announces that the New Zealand Government will contribute NZ$82.5 million to the establishment of the University of Waikato's medical school; with the university and private philanthropists contributing the remaining NZ$150 million.
  - The Commerce Commission files criminal charges against electronics retailer Noel Leeming for alleged breaches of the Fair Trading Act 1986.
  - The Gore District Council lifts its "do not drink tap water" directive for Gore.
- 22 July:
  - Sky TV buys TV3 for a symbolic $1; marking the exit of Warner Bros. Discovery from New Zealand's free-to-air television space. The sale comes into effect on 1 August.
  - New Zealand joins 24 other countries including Australia, the United Kingdom, Canada, Japan and the European Union in issuing a joint statement calling for the Gaza war to end.
  - Representatives of several Jewish and Muslim community groups including the New Zealand Jewish Council and the Federation of Islamic Associations of New Zealand (FIANZ) sign a "harmony and peace accord" to improve interfaith relations amidst the Gaza war.
- 24 July — The primary school teachers' union, the New Zealand Educational Institute, files for a judicial review at the Wellington High Court of the New Zealand Government's decision to reduce funding for literacy and Māori resource teachers during the 2025 New Zealand budget, which was released in May 2025.
- 30 July:
  - 36,000 nurses, midwives, and other health workers affiliated with the New Zealand Nurses Organisation strike to protest unsafe staffing levels at Te Whatu Ora facilities.
  - The National Emergency Management Agency issues a tsunami advisory for all coastal areas in New Zealand following a 8.8 magnitude earthquake off the eastern coast of Kamchatka Peninsula.
  - Gloriavale's Overseeing Shepherd Howard Temple pleads guilty to 12 charges including indecent assault, indecency and common assault.
- 31 July:
  - Stuff shuts down 15 community newspapers including the Western Leader and The Hutt News.
  - Dunedin-based media company Allied Press rebrands as Allied Media.
  - The New Zealand Parliament passes legislation repealing a 2018 law limiting new oil and gas exploration permits off the coast of Taranaki.
  - Director of the Federal Bureau of Investigation Kash Patel opens a new FBI attaché office in Wellington to boost bilateral law enforcement cooperation between the United States and New Zealand.
  - Te Pāti Māori (Māori Party) files urgent High Court proceedings calling on the Electoral Commission, Ministry of Justice and the Ombudsman to investigate allegations that Māori voters had been removed from the Māori electoral roll without their consent.
  - The Government introduces a law limiting voter enrolment before elections, banning prisoner voting, and starting voting 12 days early, amid rights concerns and opposition criticism.

=== August ===
- 1 August:
  - The second Donald Trump administration raises tariffs on New Zealand exports to the United States to 15 percent.
  - Visual effects company Wētā FX proposes laying off 100 jobs in its support departments based in Wellington.
- 4 August:
  - The New Zealand Government announces plans to scrap the National Certificate of Educational Achievement (NCEA) secondary school qualification.
  - A name suppression order lapses for former Deputy Commissioner of Police Jevon McSkimming, who was charged in June 2025 with eight counts of possessing objectionable material including child sexual exploitation and bestiality over a four-year period.
- 5–6 August — An RNZAF C-130J Hercules evacuated three personnel of the United States National Science Foundation from McMurdo Station.
- 6 August:
  - The Christchurch-based wool factory Wild Earth Yarns acquires the woollen dye house and spinning mill of the liquidated Napier-based company Design Spun.
  - Hato Hone St John proposes scrapping various community voluntary programmes including hospital volunteers, community carers and pet therapy services as part of a review of its services; affecting about 1,100 people.
- 8 August – The Japanese Navy makes a stop-over in Wellington for the first time since 1936.
- 9–10 August – Prime Minister Luxon hosts Australian Prime Minister Anthony Albanese in Queenstown for annual bilateral head of government talks.
- 10 August — Gloriavale Christian Community's Overseeing Shepherd Howard Temple resigns after pleading guilty to 12 charges of sexual offending against women and girls last month. Stephen Standfast is designated as his successor.
- 12 August – Green Party co-leader Chlöe Swarbrick is banned from Parliament for one week after criticising government MPs during a debate on the recognition of Palestine.
- 15 August:
  - The Supreme Court of New Zealand rules that the Family Court used the wrong legal test to lock up a 20 year old autistic man for 20 years.
  - The Supreme Court rules that riverbeds can be included in Māori customary marine title claims in the eastern Bay of Plenty.
  - KiwiRail agrees to pay HD Hyundai Mipo a settlement of NZ$144 million for the New Zealand Government's 2023 cancellation of the Project iRex ferries.
- 16 August:
  - Palestinian solidarity protests calling for an end to the Gaza war and sanctions against Israel are held in 20 cities and towns.
  - Staff at Spring Hill Corrections facility quell a riot involving 11 prisoners.
  - About 100 environmental protesters confront Resources Management Minister Shane Jones during his visit to Whangārei. The protesters were opposed to two fast-track projects including the construction of a marina in Waipiro Bay and proposed offshore sand mining in Bream Bay.
  - Multiple trans-Tasman flights are disrupted by a technical fault in Airways New Zealand's main oceanic air control system.
- 18 August:
  - KiwiRail's Interislander ferry Aratere is retired.
  - Building and Construction Minister Chris Penk announces that the Government will introduce legislation to overhaul the building consent system.
  - Nurses affiliated with the New Zealand Nurses Organisation in Auckland and Whangārei commence industrial action to protest staff shortages.
  - A member of the New Zealand Defence Force pleads guilty before a court-martial to attempted espionage on behalf of a foreign country, in the first espionage conviction in New Zealand. He is sentenced to two years' imprisonment on 20 August.
- 19 August:
  - The Interislander and Bluebridge cancel several ferry sailings due to strong swells in the Cook Strait.
  - Foreign Minister Winston Peters recalls Trevor Mallard as New Zealand ambassador to Ireland, designating Angela Hassan-Sharp as his successor.
  - Employees of media company Stuff vote to take strike action to protest their employer's plan to split their collective bargaining agreement.
- 20 August:
  - Secondary school teachers affiliated with the Post Primary Teachers' Association went on strike for a day after rejecting the Government's one percent pay rise offer.
  - The New Zealand Cabinet agrees to draft legislation banning greyhound racing in New Zealand.
- 21 August:
  - Defence Minister Judith Collins and Foreign Minister Winston Peters announce that the Government will purchase two new Airbus A321XLR jets and five MH-60R Seahawks for the New Zealand Defence Force.
  - Carter Holt Harvey proposes closing its Eves Valley Sawmill in the Tasman District, potentially affecting 142 jobs.
  - Airliner Jetstar admits to 20 charges of breaching the Fair Trading Act 1986 by misleading customers about compensation.
  - Police issue a "Gang Conflict Warrant" in Levin following a spate of local gang violence and shootings.
- 22 August – Dairy cooperative Fonterra sells its Mainland, Anchor brands, and processing operations in Australia and Sri Lanka to French dairy company Lactalis for NZ$3.845 billion.
- 23 August — NZ Post suspends several postal services to the United States and its unincorporated territories in response to the Trump Administration's new 15 percent tariff rates.
- 25 August – The murder trial of a man accused of perpetrating the Loafers Lodge fire in May 2023, which claimed five lives, commences at the Wellington High Court.
- 27 August — Economic Growth Minister Nicola Willis announces that the Government would amend legislation with the goal of breaking the country's supermarket duopoly.
- 28 August:
  - Associate Justice Minister Nicole McKee announces the Government will amend alcohol legislation to make it harder for people to block liquor licenses and to introduce one-off special trading hours for pubs and clubs hosting major sport and cultural events.
  - NZ Post introduces a new business parcel service to the United States in response to the Trump Administration's 15 percent tariff rate.
  - 160 Stuff journalists affiliated with the E tū union strike in Auckland, Hamilton, Wellington and Christchurch to protest work and pay conditions.
- 29 August — Neil Quigley resigns as chairman of the Reserve Bank of New Zealand's board.

=== September ===
- 1 September:
  - New government rules restricting the tethering of dogs, particularly puppies or pregnant dogs, come into force.
  - Strong winds down trees and damage powerlines and property in Auckland, Waikato and the Bay of Plenty. MetService issues several weather watches including a strong wind warning for Stewart Island.
  - Judge Brooke Gibson of the Auckland District Court imposes a record fine of NZ$2.25 million on Jetstar NZ for breaching the Fair Trading Act 1986 by misleading customers about compensation.
  - Prime Minister Christopher Luxon confirms the Government will amend the Overseas Investment Amendment Act 2018 to allow investor visa holders to buy homes with a minimum value of NZ$5million.
  - Regional Development Minister Shane Jones confirms that the Government will allocate NZ$30 million worth of loans to supporting regional airlines.
- 2 September:
  - Nurses affiliated with the New Zealand Nurses Organisation launch rolling 48-hour strikes on 2 and 4 September to protest understaffing and government cost-cutting measures.
  - Furniture and electronics retailer Smiths City goes into voluntary administration and temporarily closes all stores.
  - Police extend Levin's "Gang Conflict Warrant" to cover the Manawatū District following two shooting incidents targeting Police in Palmerston North.
- 3 September – Disabilities Issues Minister Louise Upston announces that the Government will reform the disability support system, with changes being rolled out in 2026.
- 4 September:
  - Immigration Minister Erica Stanford confirms that the Government will introduce legislation to make it easier to deport criminals holding permanent residency visas.
  - Carter Holt Harvey confirms plans to close down its Eves Valley sawmill in Tasman District by late November 2025, affecting over 140 jobs. Mayor of Tasman Tim King and Mayor of Nelson Nick Smith had appealed to the forestry company to delay the closure in order to clear fallen trees and vegetation caused by the Winter 2025 New Zealand floods.
  - The New Zealand Police drop sexual misconduct criminal charges against former Deputy Police Commissioner Jevon McSkimming after an independent barrister deemed the evidence as insufficient to meeting the prosecution threshold. He still faces charges of possession of objectionable material.
- 5 September:
  - Green Party MP Benjamin Doyle announces they would be resigning from Parliament effective 3 October, citing safety concerns.
  - The Sealord Group proposes closing its coated fish factory in Nelson, New Zealand, potentially affecting 79 jobs.
  - The Association of Salaried Medical Specialists rejects Health Minister Simeon Brown's request that the union enter into binding arbitration with Te Whatu Ora (Health New Zealand).
  - Māori Queen Nga wai hono i te po announces two economic initiatives: namely a summit to develop economic opportunities for Māori and a seed investment fund supported by Māori entities.
  - Thunderstorms and strong winds disrupt 28 flights at Wellington International Airport and lead to the closure of New Zealand State Highway 2.
- 6 September:
  - The Tāmaki Makaurau by-election is won by Te Pāti Māori candidate Oriini Kaipara.
  - The Sealord Group proposes closing its coated fish factory in Nelson, potentially affecting 79 jobs.
- 7 September – During the New Zealand First party's annual conference held at Palmerston North, party leader Winston Peters campaigns on increasing compulsory KiwiSaver contributions to ten percent and requiring migrants to sign a values statement. Pro-greyhound racing and Palestinian solidarity protesters picket the event.
- 8 September:
  - Fugitive father Tom Phillips is shot dead during a confrontation with Police in Piopio, Waikato. Police take one of his children into custody and launch a search for the remaining two unaccompanied minors. By evening, police find the two remaining children safe at a remote campsite.
  - ANZ Bank New Zealand agrees to pay a record fine of NZ$3.25 million to the New Zealand Government after admitting it had breached fair dealing laws twice between 2012 and 2023.
  - The murder trial of Korean mother Hakyung Yee commences, who is facing murder charges for the deaths of her two children.
  - The primary school teachers' union, the New Zealand Educational Institute, rejects the Government's latest pay offer and commences voting on strike action.
- 9 September – Voting commences in the 2025 local elections.
- 10 September – The Court of Appeal of New Zealand declines to quash Scott Watson's convictions for the murders of Ben Smart and Olivia Hope, concluding that there had been no "miscarriage of justice" in relation to the prosecution's hair evidence and Mr. Wallace's testimony.
- 12 September – Secondary school teachers affiliated with the Post Primary Teachers' Association vote to reject the Government's pay offer. The union announces that partial strikes will be held between 15 and 18 September.
- 13 September:
  - About 20,000 Palestinian solidarity supporters hold a "March for Humanity" in Central Auckland calling for the New Zealand Government to sanction Israel over its conduct in the Gaza war. 50 pro-Israel counter-demonstrators also stage march and haka (ka mate).
  - Strong overnight winds cause power outages in the Coromandel peninsula and the Western Bay of Plenty. Power utility company Powerco reports that 13,456 customers are left without power.
- 16 September – Carter Holt Harvey confirms plans to close its Tokoroa plywood manufacturing plant, affecting 119 full-time jobs.
- 17 September:
  - Several nurses turn their back on Health Minister Simeon Brown during the New Zealand Nurses Organisation's annual conference in Wellington to protest hospital understaffing and poor pay conditions.
  - Shane Jones is elected by the New Zealand First parliamentary caucus as the party's deputy leader.
  - Strong winds cause eight vegetation fires in the Canterbury Region, including a large 30 hectare fire in Southbridge.
  - The New Zealand Parliament passes urgent legislation preventing convicted abusers from adopting children from other countries.
- 18 September – Griffin's Snacks proposes closing its Proper Crisps factory in Nelson, potentially affecting 82 jobs.
- 19 September — Commuters are stranded for three hours on a Metlink Waikanae train after an overhead power cable was detached at 7:40 am.
- 20 September – Thousands gather in various centres across New Zealand including Christchurch to oppose the Government's pay equity changes.
- 22 September – A partial solar eclipse occurs above mainland New Zealand, starting at sunrise and reaching maximum around 7 am. Views from most of the North Island are blocked by clouds.
- 23 September – Hakyung Lee is convicted by the Auckland High Court of murdering her two children in 2022.
- 24 September – Anna Breman is designated as the first female Governor of the Reserve Bank of New Zealand.
- 25 September — The New Zealand Government reopens applications for oil and gas exploration throughout the country.
- 26 September
  - The Sealord Group proposes reducing its Nelson wetfish and by-products factories and fresh fish trawler operations from full-time to seasonal operations; potentially affecting 59 roles.
  - Esarona David Lologa is convicted by a jury of the High Court in Wellington of carrying out the Loafers Lodge fire in 2023.
  - Foreign Minister Winston Peters confirms during the 80th session of the United Nations General Assembly that New Zealand will not recognise Palestinian statehood.
- 27 September – The Presbyterian Church of Aotearoa New Zealand issues its first apology to survivors of historical abuse in care in Dunedin.
- 28 September — Four measles cases (three historical and one linked to international travel) are reported in the Northland Region.
- 29 September
  - The kārearea is named Bird of the Year for 2025.
  - The government announces a reform of the earthquake-prone building classification system which reduces the amount of buildings nationwide being classed as earthquake-prone by 55%.
- 30 September:
  - Carter Holt Harvey confirms plans to close its Tokoroa plywood plant in November 2025, affecting 119 jobs.
  - A measles case linked to international travel is reported in Queenstown, bringing the total number of cases to five.

=== October ===
- 1 October – The Government confirms it will not sell its shares in the electrical generation sector but will instead increase capital investments and the enforcement powers of the Electricity Authority.
- 2 October:
  - The Police and Serious Fraud Office (SFO) end their criminal investigation into alleged electoral misconduct at the Manurewa Marae during the 2023 New Zealand general election, citing insufficient evidence of corruption.
  - Māori activist group Toitū Te Tiriti, led by Eru Kapa-Kingi, severs its formal relationship with Te Pāti Māori, citing leadership differences and a desire for independence.
  - Three new measles cases are reported in the Northland Region, bringing the total number of cases nationwide to ten.
- 4 October — The Presbyterian Church of Aotearoa New Zealand issues its second apology to survivors of historical abuse in Auckland.
- 6 October:
  - Mike Davidson is elected as a list MP for the Green Party following the resignation of Benjamin Doyle.
  - The New Zealand government agrees to pay Samoa 10 million tala ($3.6 million) in compensation for the sinking of HMNZS Manawanui in 2024.
- 7 October — ASB Bank agrees to pay NZ$135.6 million to settle a lawsuit relating to alleged breaches of the Credit Contracts and Consumer Finance Act. ANZ Bank New Zealand declines to settle the lawsuit with plaintiffs.
- 8 October — Over 100 pro-Palestinian protesters attempt to disrupt the New Zealand Aerospace Summit 2025 at Christchurch's Te Pae Convention Centre. Police arrest 22 protesters.
- 10 October — Local authorities activate emergency operations centres in the Grey and Buller Districts in response to heavy rainfall, flooding and landslides. MetService issues heavy rain and wind warnings for that region.
- 11 October:
  - The 2025 local elections, including local referendums on Māori wards and constituencies, conclude.
  - 24 district and regional councils vote to remove their Māori wards and constituencies while 18 others vote to retain them.
- 14 October:
  - Minister for Rail Winston Peters confirms that the New Zealand Government has contracted the Chinese state-owned shipyard COMEC to build two new rail-enabled Interislander ferries, which are expected to be delivered in 2029.
  - The New Zealand Parliament passes legislation allowing radio and television stations to broadcast advertisements on Christmas Day, Good Friday, Easter Sunday and Anzac Day.
  - Heavy rain causes flooding in the Waitomo and Ruapehu Districts in the central North Island, affecting several farms, roads, and some houses. Mayor of Waitomo John Robertson estimates the flood damage to be in the regions.
- 17 October:
  - Highways reopen in the flood-stricken Waitomo and Ruapehu Districts.
  - The New Zealand Professional Firefighters Union (NZPFU) held a one hour strike following the breakdown of pay negotiations broke down with Fire and Emergency New Zealand.
  - The New Zealand Government reinstates several United Nations sanctions against Iran including asset freezes, travel bans and trade restrictions after Iran withdraws from the JCPOA agreements in September 2025.
- 18 October — The Primary Principals Collective Bargaining Union accepts a 2.5% pay rise offer following four months of negotiations with the Ministry of Education. This will be followed by another 2.1% pay rise in 2026.
- 20 October:
  - The New Zealand Government introduces two new requirements for job seeker beneficiaries who have failed a welfare obligation: engaging in three job search activities weekly and attending at least one employment-training course per month.
  - A measles case linked to international travel is reported in Auckland.
- 21 October:
  - Strong winds cause power outages, fallen trees and disrupt road and rail travel across the Wairarapa region. Lines company Powerco reports that 10,000 houses in the area have lost electricity due to fallen power lines.
  - Strong winds and heavy rains disrupt road, rail and air travel in the Wellington Region. One person is killed by a fallen tree branch in Mount Victoria during a storm that hits Wellington.
  - Strong winds cause four vegetation fires in the Hawke's Bay Pōrangahau area, leading to the evacuation of vie homes.
  - Strong winds and dry conditions cause six fires in the Kaikōura District, leading to the destruction of 14 buildings and local evacuations.
  - Three new measles cases are reported in Manawatū and Nelson.
- 22 October:
  - Fire and Emergency New Zealand deploys numerous firefighters and helicopters to combat fires in the Kaikōura District and Pōrangahau.
  - Strong winds and fires cause power outages and flight disruptions through the lower North Island and upper South Island. MetService issues red-level wind warnings for the Canterbury and Wellington Regions and the Wairarapa south of Carterton.
  - Emergency Management and Recovery Minister Mark Mitchell declares a local state of emergency in Canterbury in response to strong winds and fires.
  - Parliament passes legislation limiting the threshold for Māori foreshore and seabed claims. While government parties supported the legislation, opposition parties vowed to repeal the law change. In response, Te Pāti Māori MPs Debbie Ngarewa-Packer and Tākuta Ferris burnt a copy of the legislation in protest.
- 23 October – Five unions (the Public Service Association, the New Zealand Educational Institute, the Post Primary Teachers' Association, the New Zealand Nurses Organisation, and the Association of Salaried Medical Specialists) hold a coordinated national strike. Due to severe wind storms nationwide, several protest events in the South Island were cancelled or moved indoors.
- 24 October:
  - Emergency Management Minister Mark Mitchell declares a state of local emergency for the Southland Region in response to wind and storm damage.
  - The Clutha District Council declares a state of emergency in the Clutha District in response to wind and storm damage.
  - The state of emergency had been lifted for much of Canterbury except the Kaikoura District.
  - Health New Zealand confirms that a recent measles community outbreak was linked to a Northland patient who travelled aboard a Bluebridge ferry across the Cook Strait on 3 October, bringing the total number of measles cases nationwide to eight.
- 25 October – 485 people affiliated with the environmental group Bream Bay Guardians build sand sculptures to protest against a fast-tracked sand mining proposal in Bream Bay.
- 26 October:
  - Police arrest an 18-year old Dunedin man in relation to a bomb threat against the Wellington Islamic Centre in Kilbirnie.
  - Health NZ confirms a measles case at Wellington Girls' College. Four staff and 60 students are identified as possible contacts of the patient.
- 27 October:
  - Two new measles cases are reported in Wellington, bringing the total number of cases to 10. One case were linked to international travel while seven were linked to a "high-risk exposure event" on a Bluebridge ferry on 3 October. Health NZ identifies several hundred close contacts at Wellington College.
  - Waatea News reports that Te Pāti Māori members had voted to recommend the suspension of MP Mariameno Kapa-Kingi and that the Te Tai Tokerau electorate executive be "reset" at a meeting on 23 October.
  - The New Zealand Government contributes NZ$150,000 to mayoral relief funds in Southland and Clutha District to assist with post-windstorm damage.
  - Chinese citizens transiting through New Zealand become eligible for the New Zealand Electronic Travel Authority (NZETA).
- 28 October:
  - The Labour Party unveils its capital gains tax policy to fund doctors' visits.
  - Education Minister Erica Stanford releases the Government's full draft curriculum for Years 0–10 students for consultation.
  - A power outage at a waste treatment plant in Warkworth contaminates oyster farms in the Mahurangi River.
- 30 October – Dairy company Fonterra's farmer shareholders vote to authorise the sale of several brands including Mainland and Anchor to French company Lactalis. New Zealand First leader and cabinet minister Winston Peters denounces the sale as "short-sighted."
  - Health New Zealand has confirmed two new cases of measles, bringing the total number of active cases to 13. The number of close contacts has risen to 2,142.
- 31 October:
  - The Waitangi Tribunal rules that the Citizenship Act 1977 breaches the Treaty of Waitangi by limiting eligibility for citizenship by descent for Māori people to one generation and failing to recognise Māori as tangata whenua ("People of the Land").
  - A power outage affects 23,000 homes and businesses in the Far North District.
  - Auckland Grammar School instructs Years 9 and 10 students to remain at home after a student tested positive for measles.

=== November ===
- 1 November – A Wellington College student is diagnosed with measles, bringing the total number of measles cases nationwide to 14.
- 2 November – A new measles case is reported in Auckland, bringing the total number of cases nationwide to 17.
- 3 November – The New Zealand Government launches a three-month visa waiver trial for Chinese citizens with valid Australian visitor, work, family or student visas.
- 4 November – 400 protesters gather on the grounds of the New Zealand Parliament to protest against the Government's proposed legislation easing restrictions of gene technology. New Zealand First leader Winston Peters and Green Party MP Scott Willis address the crowd, reiterating their opposition to the legislation.
- 5 November:
  - 20,000 secondary school teachers affiliated with the Post Primary Teachers' Association hold a half-day strike to demand better pay and work conditions.
  - Australian mining company Santana Minerals secures a 30-year permit from the New Zealand Government to mine gold from the Bendigo-Ophir goldfields.
  - The New Zealand Parliament passes legislation formalizing a Treaty of Waitangi settlement with Ngāti Pāoa. The settlement includes NZ$23.5 million in financial compensation, recognising 12 "culturally significant" sites, and a formal Crown apology for historical land alienation.
- 6 November:
  - Former Deputy Police Commissioner Jevon McSkimming pleads guilty to three charges of possessing child sexual exploitation and bestiality material.
  - A fault on a power sub-transmission feeder causes a power shortage in the southern Far North District that affects 23,000 homes and businesses.
- 7 November – Local authorities in the Clutha District and Southland Region lift local states of emergency caused by the October 2025 New Zealand storms.
- 8 November – A wildfire breaks out in Tongariro National Park, engulfing 2,500 hectares and leading to the evacuation of campers and the closure of a nearby highway.
- 9 November:
  - The wildfire in Tongariro National Park engulfs 2,500 hectares, leading to the evacuation of Whakapapa Village. Firefighters manage to contain 20% of the fire.
  - Te Pāti Māori's national council votes overnight to expel MPs Mariameno Kapa-Kingi and Tākuta Ferris following several weeks of internal conflict. The decision is confirmed by the party's leadership the following day.
  - The New Zealand government extends its suspension of NZ$29.8 million worth of funding to the Cook Islands over the next two financial years in response to the Cook Islands government signing several partnership agreements with China in February 2025.
- 10 November:
  - The wildfire in the Tongariro National Park subsides due to rainfall and the efforts of firefighters to contain the blaze. Residents of Whakapapa Village are allowed to return. An estimated 3,000 hectares have been damaged by the wildfire.
  - The contactless fare payment system Motu Move is launched on public buses and the ferry in Christchurch.
- 11 November
  - An investigation by the Independent Police Conduct Authority concludes that several senior New Zealand Police executives including former Police Commissioner Andrew Coster had covered up allegations of serious offending lodged by a police employee against former Deputy Police Commissioner Jevon McSkimming.
  - The government proposes the transfer of gun licensing responsibilities from the police to an independent Firearms Safety Authority.
  - The Otago Regional Council extends OceanaGold's mining consent for its Macraes gold mine for another five years.
- 13 November – ACT leader and Deputy Prime Minister David Seymour's controversial Regulatory Standards Bill passes its third reading in Parliament, becoming law.
- 14 November:
  - The New Zealand Government allocates NZ$2 million to the Dunedin Tunnels Trail cyclewear connecting Dunedin and Mosgiel.
  - Several schools and early childhood centres close after the Ministry of Business, Innovation and Employment (MBIE) issues a recall notice for two coloured sands products over concerns about asbestos contamination.
- 17 November – The Supreme Court of New Zealand upholds a 2024 Court of Appeal decision that Uber drivers were employees rather than contractors.
- 18 November:
  - Taumata Arowai, the national water regulator, takes control of the Northland town of Kāeo's drinking water supply from private contractor, Wai Care Environmental Consultants. The town had been under a boil water notice for ten years and lacked running water.
  - A hikoi led by Patient Voice Aotearoa spokesperson Malcolm Mulholland delivers the Buller Declaration, advocating for better health services, to the New Zealand Parliament.
- 19 November:
  - Manawatu Prison goes into lock down after receiving a bomb threat.
  - The New Zealand Cabinet suspends the issuing new prescriptions of puberty blockers for children with gender dysphoria until the outcome of a major British clinical trial expected in 2031. This suspension is expected to come into force on 19 December.
- 20 November — Conservation Minister Tama Potaka announced that feral cats would be added to Predator Free 2050's list of exotic species targeted for eradication.
- 25 November:
  - Two climbers are found dead while two others are rescued following a fall on Aoraki / Mount Cook.
  - The New Zealand government confirms it will introduce legislation in 2026 abolishing the regional councils as part of its overhaul of the resource management framework. Local territorial authorities would assume the functions and responsibilities of the regional councils.
- 26 November – Hakyung Lee is sentenced to life imprisonment by the Auckland High Court for murdering her two children in 2022.
- 28 November:
  - The High Court of New Zealand fines the Westpac New Zealand bank NZ$3.64 million for breaching lender responsibility rules.
  - 2,000 members of the New Zealand Professional Firefighters Union strike for an hour to protest pay and work conditions, ageing equipment, and staffing problems. On 27 November, Otago firefighters experienced four equipment failures including a broken down command truck while responding to lcoal vegetation fires.
- 29 November:
  - Air New Zealand and Jetstar temporarily ground their Airbus A320neo jets in response to a technical glitch caused by solar radiation. Several flights are disrupted nationwide.
  - Stuff journalist Andrea Vance reports that an attempt by Chris Bishop to roll Christopher Luxon has failed.
  - The Waitangi Tribunal rules that the New Zealand government's decision to exclude the Treaty of Waitangi from a draft geothermal energy agreement would constitute a Treaty breach.

=== December ===
- 1 December:
  - Prime Minister Christopher Luxon and Local Government Minister Simon Watts announce that the Government will introduce legislation to limit annual rates increases by local governments will be limited to between 2 and 4%
  - The Professional Association for Transgender Health Aotearoa (PATHA) files a legal injunction to stop the incoming ban on new puberty blocker prescriptions, which is expected to come into force on 19 December.
- 3 December:
  - A tornado causes power outages to 200 properties in the Manawatū-Whanganui region and damages several caravans at a Lake Dudding motor camp, wounding one person.
  - Five new cases of measles are confirmed, bringing the total number of cases nationwide in the 2025 outbreak to 27.
- 4 December:
  - Woolworths admits to one charge of violating the Food Act 2014 in relation to a rodent infestation at its South Dunedin store in February 2024.
  - Former Te Pāti Māori MP Mariameno Kapa-Kingi files an interim injunction at the Wellington High Court challenging her expulsion from the party.
  - The Post Primary Teachers' Association agrees to accept the Government's pay offer providing two pay rises totalling 4.6 percent over the next two years.
  - Swedish multinational furniture retailer IKEA opens its first New Zealand store in Mount Wellington, Auckland. Thousands including Prime Minister Christopher Luxon attend the opening ceremony.
- 5 December:
  - Member of Parliament Mariameno Kapa-Kingi is reinstated as a member of Te Pāti Māori by an interim Wellington High Court ruling.
  - Two adults and five children at the Kindercare kindergarten in Christchurch suffer chemical burns after being accidentally exposed to a hazardous substance being poured on a waterslide.
  - The Controller and Auditor-General of New Zealand launches an investigation into the Chatham Islands Council's expenditure and procurement policies.
  - Craig Stobo temporarily steps down as chairperson of the Financial Market Authority pending an investigation by the Ministry of Business, Innovation and Employment (MBIE).
- 6 December — A measles case is reported in Queenstown, bringing the total number of cases reported nationally to 30. 22 cases are no longer infectious.
- 8 December:
  - A wildfire engulfs over 320 hectares of Tongariro National Park, leading to the closure of sections of State Highway 47. Significant firefighting resources including 60 firefighters, 16 vehicles and nine helicopters are deployed to contain the blaze.
  - The National Iwi Chairs Forum delivers a 24,000-strong petition urging the Education Minister Erica Stanford to reverse an amendment abolishing the requirement for school boards to uphold the Treaty of Waitangi.
- 9 December:
  - The Supreme Court of New Zealand rules that two parents who care for their severely disabled adult children should be recognised as homeworkers who are entitled to the minimum wage.
  - The New Zealand Government announces two proposed bills to replace the Resource Management Act 1991.
- 10 December:
  - The Taranaki Regional Council confirms that Lake Rotomanu in New Plymouth will be drained over the next four days commencing 11 December in response to a Corbicula fluminea infestation.
  - The Court of Appeal of New Zealand overturns a 2023 High Court ruling finding that toy company Zuru's packaging had infringed on Lego's trademark.
  - The New Zealand Government launches a new mobile app called "Govt.nz" to make it easier for people to access government services.
- 11 December:
  - The New Zealand Parliament passes two urgent laws delaying a ban on farrowing crates by ten years and legislation amending the Fast-track Approvals Act 2024.
  - Parliament rejects a 36,549-strong petition organised by Queenstown Volunteer Fire Brigade secretary Katherine Lamont for volunteer firefighters to receive the same ACC coverage as professional firefighters.
  - Principals affiliated with the New Zealand Educational Institute reject a 4.6 percent government pay offer, citing the exclusion of a curriculum change allowance.
- 12 December:
  - The Christchurch District Court fines three companies Skyline Enterprises, Naylor Love Central Otago Limited and Wilsons Contractors Limited over a total of NZ$500,000 for their role in a landslide that damaged a Queenstown street during the 2023 southern New Zealand floods. The three companies also pleaded guilty to breaching the Resource Management Act 1991.
  - Former Gloriavale Christian Community leader Howard Temple is sentenced to 26 months in jail for indecently assaulting girls and women over a 20 year period.
- 13 December – The 2025 New Zealand bravery awards are announced.
- 14 December:
  - A large fire engulfs four hectares of gum trees and slash near a eucalyptus forest in Kerikeri. 20 firefighters, two helicopters and a digger are deployed.
  - A large vegetation fire breaks out along State Highway 4 near Parikino in the Whanganui District.
  - 400 Air New Zealand cabin crew affiliated with the E tū union call off a planned strike on 18 December after reaching an "in principle agreement" with their employer.
- 15 December:
  - Armed police are deployed to guard several Jewish sites nationwide including Kadimah School in response to the 2025 Bondi Beach shooting, which occurred yesterday.
  - Police recover the bodies of an Australian climber and a dual Canadian-New Zealand climber who went missing in Fiordland National Park over the weekend.
  - A large vegetation fire breaks out near Waiinu Beach in South Taranaki, leading to the evacuation of local residents.
- 16 December:
  - Justice Richard McIlraith of the Manukau District Court voids the results of the Papatoetoe subdivision of the Ōtara-Papatoetoe Local Board election during the 2025 Auckland Council election, citing significant electoral irregularities.
  - The Otago Regional Council orders the Dunedin City Council to stop discharging wastewater into Surrey Street and the Caversham area by June 2027.
  - The New Zealand Government reduces transport subsidies for elderly and disabled people from 75% to 65%.
  - The New Zealand Government announces plans to create a new mega ministry called the Ministry for Cities, Environment, Regions and Transport (MCERT).
  - Parliament passes the Electoral Amendment Act 2025, which tightens the timeframe for voter registration, bans prisoners from voting, and allows larger anonymous political donations.
- 17 December:
  - Assistant Commissioner Mike Pannett is appointed as Deputy Police Commissioner.
  - The New Zealand Government agrees to return 3,068 hectares in the upper South Island, including the Kaiteriteri Recreation Reserve and the Abel Tasman Coast Track, plus a $420 million compensation, to Te Tau Ihu Māori as part of the Nelson Tenths settlement.
  - Former Deputy Police Commissioner Jevon McSkimming is sentenced to nine months of home detention after pleading guilty to charges of possessing objectionable material.
  - Primary school teachers affiliated with the New Zealand Educational Institute reject the Government's pay off of a 4.6% pay rise over the next two years.
  - Justice Michele Wilkinson-Smith of the Wellington High Court rules in favour of PATHA's bid to delay an incoming ban on new puberty blocker prescriptions expected to come into effect on 19 December, pending a judicial review.
  - Justice Pheroze Jagose of the Auckland High Court dismisses food processing company Talley's Group's defamation case against broadcaster TVNZ and journalist Thomas Mead over a 2021 story covering its Ashburton plant.
  - One new case of measles is reported in Queenstown, bringing the total number of cases nationwide to 32. Four cases were active at the time.
- 18 December:
  - The Ministry of Education cancels Gloriavale Christian School's registration as a private school effective 23 January next year, citing insufficient evidence that the school was complying with registration criteria.
  - Wellington High Court Justice Jason McHerron orders Corrections Department chief executive Jeremy Lightfoot to comply with a legal requirement entitling prisoners to at least one hour of exercise daily.
  - The Waihi North extension of OceanaGold's Waihi mine becomes the first mining project to gain approval under the Fast-track Approvals Act 2024's regime.
  - The Whangarei District Council votes unanimously to reject plans for fast-tracked sand mining at Bream Bay.
- 19 December:
  - Esarona David Lologa is sentence to life imprisonment with a minimum term of 22 years for murdering five people and causing the Loafers Lodge fire in 2023.
  - High Court Justice David Gendall rules that Justice Minister Paul Goldsmith unlawfully appointed Human Rights Commissioner Stephen Rainbow and Race Relations Commissioner Melissa Derby.
- 20 December — Members of the Brian Tamaki–aligned "True Patriots of NZ" attempt to block a Sikh rally in Auckland. Police intervene to keep the two groups apart.
- 22 December — India and New Zealand confirm plans to sign a free trade agreement in 2026.
- 23 December - A scrub fire destroys multiple buildings and forces the evacuation of several residents between Fernhill, Hawke's Bay and the Ngaruroro River bridge.
- 25 December – Gull New Zealand and NPD announce plans to merge their New Zealand operations, subject to approval from the Commerce Commission.
- 29 December — Gale force winds disrupt camping grounds and festivals, down trees and cause power outages in the upper North Island and Buller District in the South Island's West Coast Region.
- 30 December — Strong winds cause power disruptions to 10,000 homes and at least 50 cellphone towers in the Tasman District.
- 31 December – The 2026 New Year Honours are announced.

== Holidays and observances ==
Public holidays in New Zealand in 2025 are as follows:

- 1 January – New Year's Day
- 2 January – Day after New Year's Day
- 6 February – Waitangi Day
- 18 April – Good Friday
- 21 April – Easter Monday
- 25 April – Anzac Day
- 2 June – King's Birthday
- 20 June – Matariki
- 27 October – Labour Day
- 25 December – Christmas Day
- 26 December – Boxing Day

== Weather ==
Highest annual sunshine hours

1. 2743 hours – New Plymouth
2. 2672 hours – Richmond
3. 2644 hours – Blenheim

Highest annual rainfall

1. 10,951 millimetres (431.1 in) – Cropp River

Lowest annual rainfall

1. 307 millimetres (12.1 in) – Alexandra

Highest recorded temperatures

1. 35.3 °C (95.5 °F) – Kawerau, 7 December
2. 33.8 °C (92.8 °F) – Napier, 8 December
3. 33.7 °C (92.7 °F) – Ettrick, 17 February

Lowest recorded temperature

1. −12.9 °C (8.8 °F) – Mount Cook Aerodrome, 8 June

Highest recorded wind gust

1. 252 km/h (157 mph) – Cape Turnagain, 21 October

== Sport ==
=== Cricket ===
January

- New Zealand completes 2–1 series win over Sri Lanka in a three-match Twenty20 International series in New Zealand.
- New Zealand defeats Sri Lanka 2–1 in a three-match ODI series in New Zealand.

December

- 19 December – Following a prolonged disagreement with New Zealand Cricket's board and key cricket stakeholders, Scott Weenink resigned from his position as its chief executive.

=== Football ===
- 24 March – New Zealand qualifies for the 2026 FIFA World Cup after defeating New Caledonia 3–0 in Auckland.

=== Horse racing ===
==== Harness racing ====
- Auckland Cup – Republican Party
- New Zealand Cup – Kingman
- Rowe Cup – Bet N Win

==== Thoroughbred racing ====
- Auckland Cup – Trav
- New Zealand Cup – Bozo
- Wellington Cup – Wolfgang

=== Lawn bowls ===
- Men's singles champion – Matt Berry (Pringle Park Bowling Club)
- Men's pair champions – Jamie Hill (Mt Albert Bowling Club), Lance Pascoe (Elmwood Park Bowling Club) (skip)
- Men's fours champions – Mike Galloway (skip), David Clark, Martin Dixon and Steve Fisher
- Women's singles champion – Debbie White (Hinuera Bowling Club)
- Women's pair champions – Lisa Prideaux (Auckland Bowling Club), Olivia Bloomfield (New Lynn Bowling Club) (skip)
- Women's fours champions – Val Smith (skip), Ashleigh Jeffcoat, Kimberley Hemingway and Debbie White

=== Netball ===
- 10 September - Netball New Zealand suspends the Silver Ferns' coach Dame Noeline Taurua over concerns over her management style and bullying allegations.
- 25 October – Following an internal investigation and protracted negotiations, Netball New Zealand reinstates Dame Taurua as the Silver Ferns' coach, effective late 2025.

=== Rowing ===
- New Zealand Secondary School Championships (Maadi Cup)
  - Maadi Cup (boys' U18 eight) – Westlake Boys High School
  - Levin Jubilee Cup (girls' U18 eight) – St Margaret's College
  - Star Trophy (overall points) – King's College

=== Rugby union ===
- 9 June – Mark Robinson announces his resignation as chief executive of the New Zealand national rugby union team effective at the end of the year, citing family reasons.

=== Shooting ===
- Ballinger Belt – Ross Geange (Hamilton Whatawhata)

=== Tennis ===
The ASB Classic tournament is held in Auckland from 28 December 2024 to 11 January 2025:

- Women's singles – Clara Tauson
- Women's doubles – Jiang Xinyu / Wu Fang-hsien
- Men's singles – Gaël Monfils
- Men's doubles – Michael Venus / Nikola Mektić

== Deaths ==
=== January ===
- 1 January
  - Helen Hogan, educator (Hillmorton High School, WEA), editor of poetry anthologies, and Māori studies scholar (born 1923).
  - Lyn Fleming, Police senior sergeant and first policewoman in New Zealand to be killed in the line of duty (born 1963).
- 2 January – Lex Clark, Olympic rower (1964) (born 1943).
- 3 January
  - Kate Coolahan, commercial artist, fashion illustrator, printmaker, and design educator (Wellington Polytechnic) (born 1929).
  - Dame Tariana Turia, politician, Labour list MP (1996–2002), MP for Te Tai Hauāuru (2002–2014), co-leader of the Māori Party (2004–2014), Minister for the Community and Voluntary Sector (2003–2004, 2008–2011), Minister for Disability Issues (2009–2014), Minister for Whānau Ora (2010–2014) (born 1944).
- 5 January
  - Philippa Blair, artist (born 1945).
  - Lou Robinson, structural engineer and heritage advocate (born 1943).
- 7 January – Arthur Pomeroy, classical scholar (Victoria University of Wellington), chess player and administrator (born 1953).
- 18 January – Russell Marshall, politician and diplomat, MP for Wanganui (1972–1990), Minister of Education (1984–1987), Minister of Foreign Affairs (1987–1990), chancellor of Victoria University of Wellington (2000–2002), High Commissioner to the United Kingdom (2002–2005) (born 1936).
- 19 January – David Johnston, disaster researcher (Massey University) (born 1966).
- 20 January – Richard Hipa, Niuean public servant and politician, Secretary of Government (2008–2017), Member of the Niue Assembly (2020–2023) (born 1957).
- 21 January
  - Diana Beaglehole, historian (born 1938).
  - Hansgerd Delbrück, scholar of German literature (Victoria University of Wellington) (born 1941).
- 22 January – Bill Boyd, Rotarian, president of Rotary International (2006–2007) (born 1933).
- 24 January – Ann McKenna, field hockey player (national team) and cricketer (Canterbury, national team) (born 1943).
- 25 January – Pakaitore Turia, rugby union player (Wellington, Horowhenua-Kapiti) (born 1995).
- 29 January – Ian Wood, civil engineer (University of Canterbury), Fellow of the Royal Society of New Zealand (since 1990) (born 1930).
- 30 January – John Pettit, undersea diver (wreck of the Elingamite), nurseryman, and politician, Auckland Regional Councillor (1986–1992) (born 1930).
- 31 January – Peter Penlington, lawyer and judge, King's Counsel (since 1978), High Court judge (1990–2000) (born 1932).
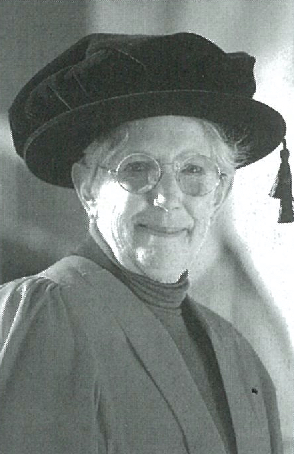
Kate Coolahan

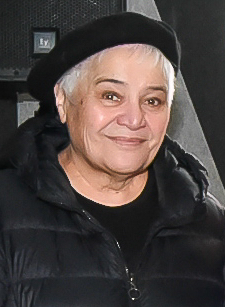
Dame Tariana Turia

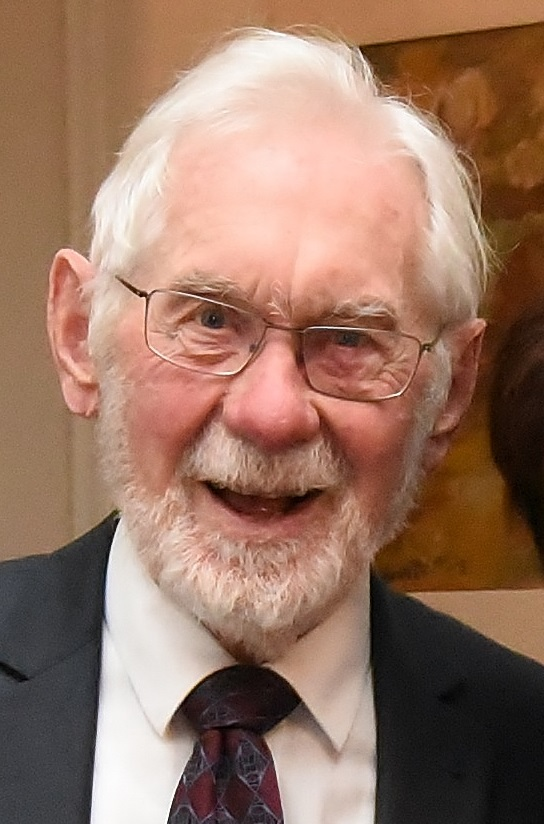
Russell Marshall

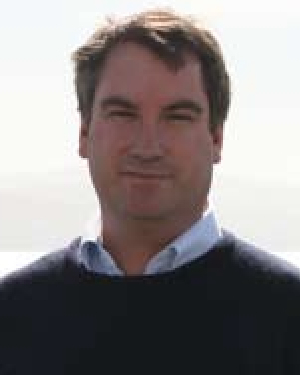
David Johnston

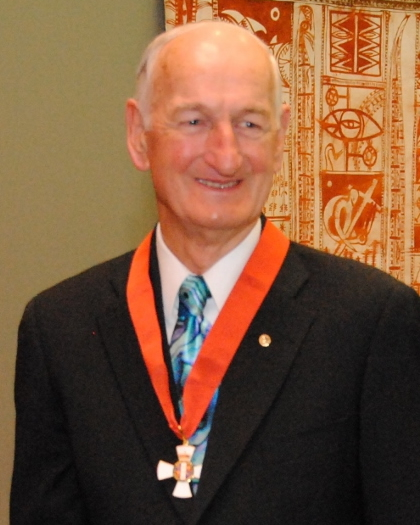
Bill Boyd

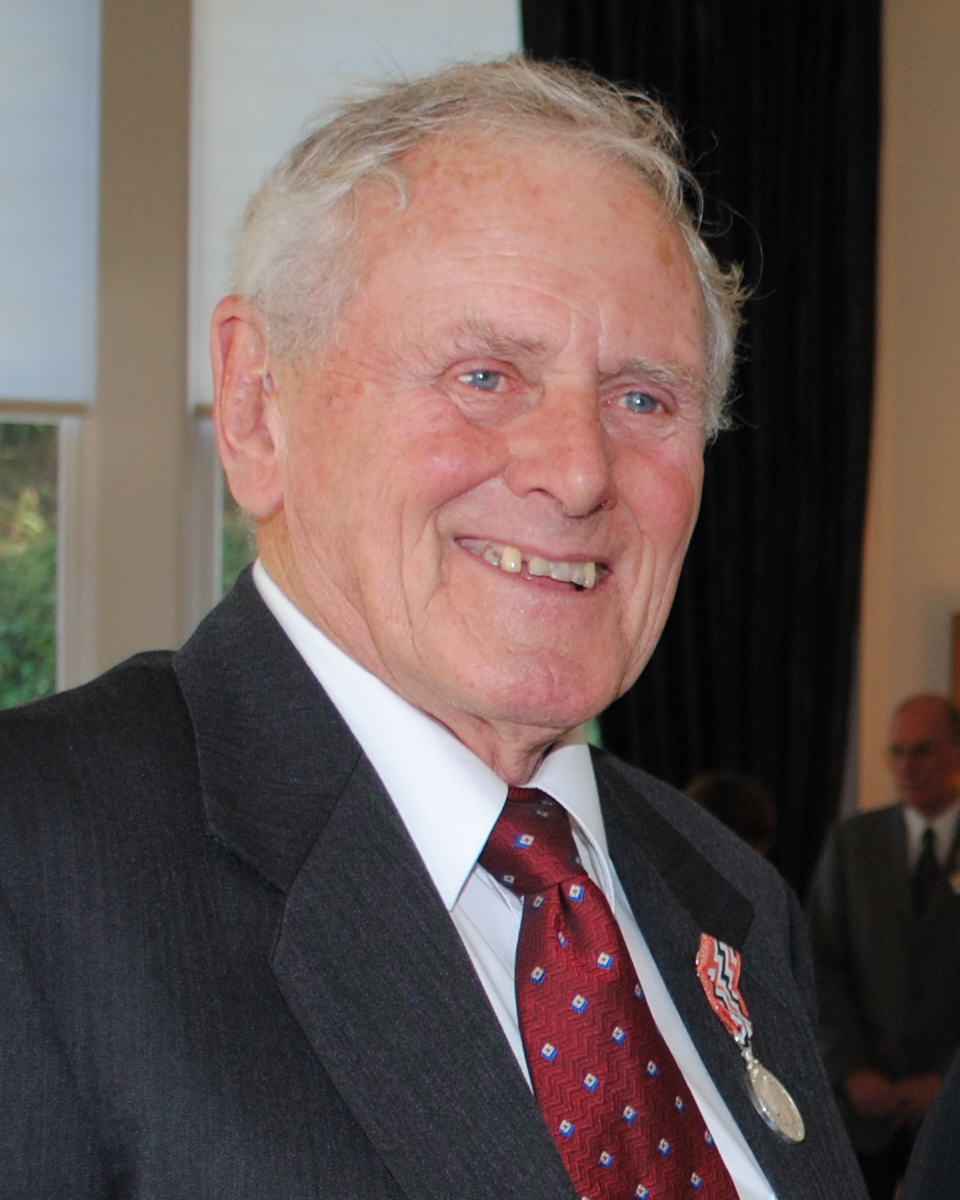
John Pettit

=== February ===
- 1 February
  - Mike Behrens, lawyer and judge, King's Counsel (since 1999), District Court judge (2004–2011) (born 1941).
  - Dame Iritana Tāwhiwhirangi, Māori language advocate (born 1929).
- 2 February – Peter Babich, Hall of Fame viticulturist and businessman (born 1932).
- 5 February – Brian Turner, field hockey player (national team), poet and environmental campaigner, Commonwealth Poetry Prize (1999), Poet Laureate (2003–2005) (born 1944).
- 6 February – Jim Cole, volcanologist (University of Canterbury), Fellow of the Royal Society of New Zealand (since 2004) (born 1941).
- 7 February – Ian Barton, forester, heritage advocate (Queen's Redoubt Trust), and local-body politician, Franklin District Councillor (1998–2004) (born 1937).
- 10 February
  - Lynne Giddings, nursing and women's studies academic (Auckland University of Technology, University of Auckland) (born 1945).
  - Toni Huata, Māori musician (born 1969).
  - Rod McElrea, racing driver, national beach racing champion (1971), OSCA champion (1983) (born 1941).
- 12 February – Theo Janssen, sculptor, stained-glass artist and painter (born 1934).
- 13 February – Joe Pope, business executive (Petrocorp, ENZA) and rugby administrator, chair of Hurricanes franchise (1999–2003) and Wellington Rugby Football Union (2003–2009) (born 1941).
- 15 February
  - David Ellison, Māori leader (Kāti Huirapa), veterans' welfare and children's health advocate (born 1936).
  - David Parsons, musician, composer and ethnomusicologist (born 1944).
- 17 February – David Saunders, lawyer and judge, District Court judge (1993–2020) (born c. 1951).
- 20 February
  - Reg Douglas, Olympic rower (1956), British Empire and Commonwealth Games gold (1954, 1958) and silver medallist (1954) (born 1930).
  - Sir Peter Trapski, lawyer and judge, chief District Court judge (1985–1989) (born 1935).
  - Maata Wharehoka, weaver, Māori arts advocate, community leader (Parihaka), Ngā Tohu ā Tā Kīngi Īhaka (2015) (born 1950).
- 21 February – John Anderson, businessman, founder of Contiki Tours (1962) (born 1938).
- 24 February – Khalid Sandhu, Muslim community leader and physician, president of the Federation of Islamic Associations of New Zealand (1986–1988, 1989–1990) (born 1942).
- 27 February
  - Dave Gillespie, rugby union player (Otago, Wellington, national team) (born 1934).
  - Michael Moroney, Hall of Fame Thoroughbred racehorse trainer (Brew, Tofane, Xcellent) (born 1958).
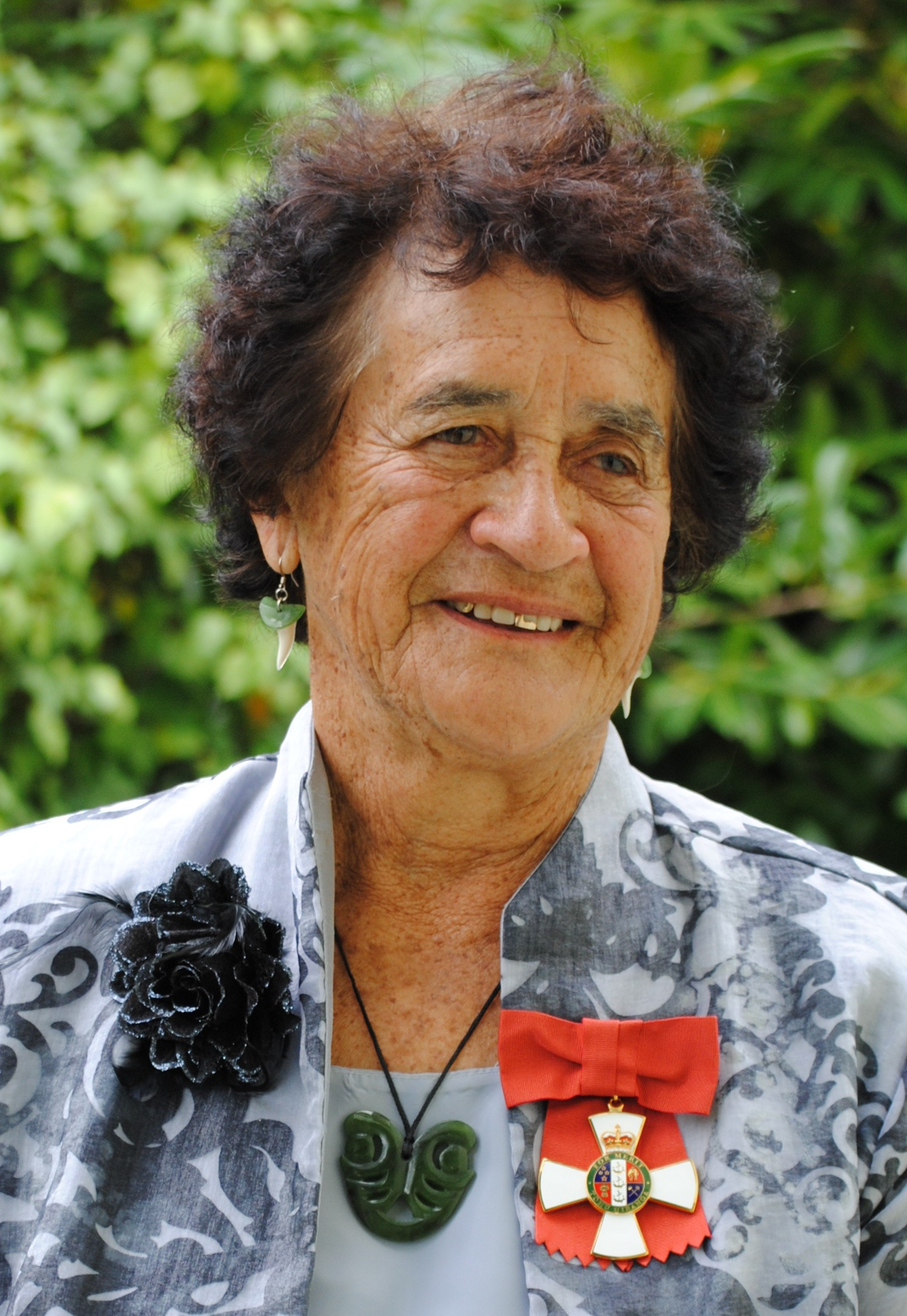
Dame Iritana Tāwhiwhirangi

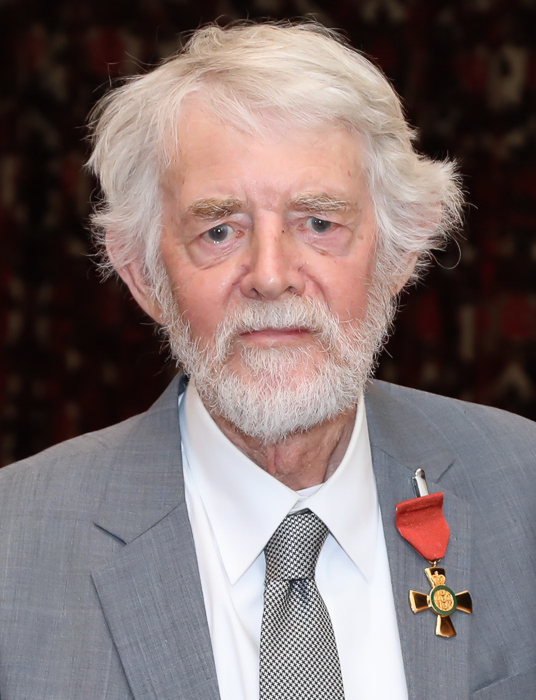
Brian Turner

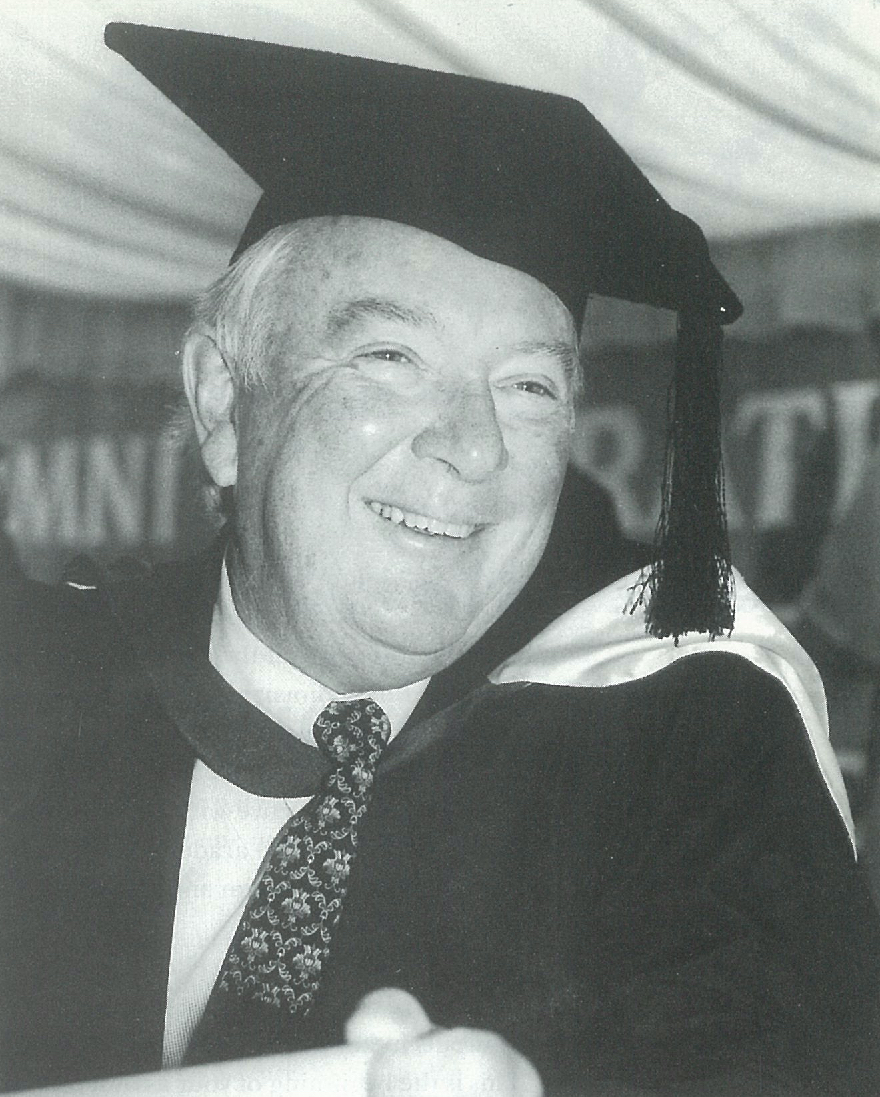
Sir Peter Trapski

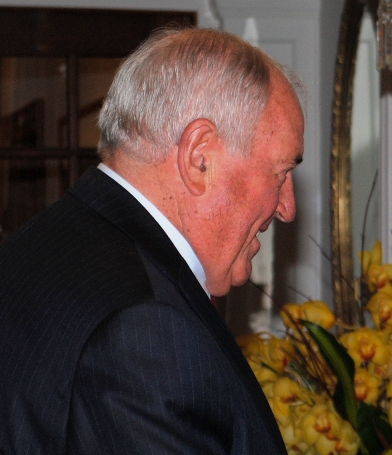
John Anderson

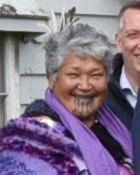
Maata Wharehoka

=== March ===
- 11 March – Clive Revill, actor (The Empire Strikes Back, Irma La Douce, Oliver!) (born 1930).
- 13 March – Brian McMahon, venereologist, army officer, medical superintendent (Wakari Hospital, Dunedin Hospital) and lecturer (University of Otago) (born 1929).
- 14 March – Anne Nightingale, nurse, chair of the Nursing Council (1975–1984) (born 1932).
- 16 March – Gordon H. Brown, art historian, gallery director (Waikato Art Gallery, Sarjeant Gallery), and artist (born 1931).
- 20 March – Matt Mitchell, sailor (Team New Zealand, Alinghi, Oracle Team USA) (born c. 1971).
- 21 March – Nick Carter, lawyer and judge, Māori Land Court judge (1989–2002) (born 1935).
- 22 March – Alex Wyllie, rugby union player (Canterbury, national team) and coach (Canterbury, national team, Argentina) (born 1944).
- 31 March
  - Sir Roger Clifford, 7th Baronet (born 1936).
  - Ron Jones, obstetrician and gynaecologist (National Women's Hospital, University of Auckland), whistleblower in the "Unfortunate Experiment" (born 1939).
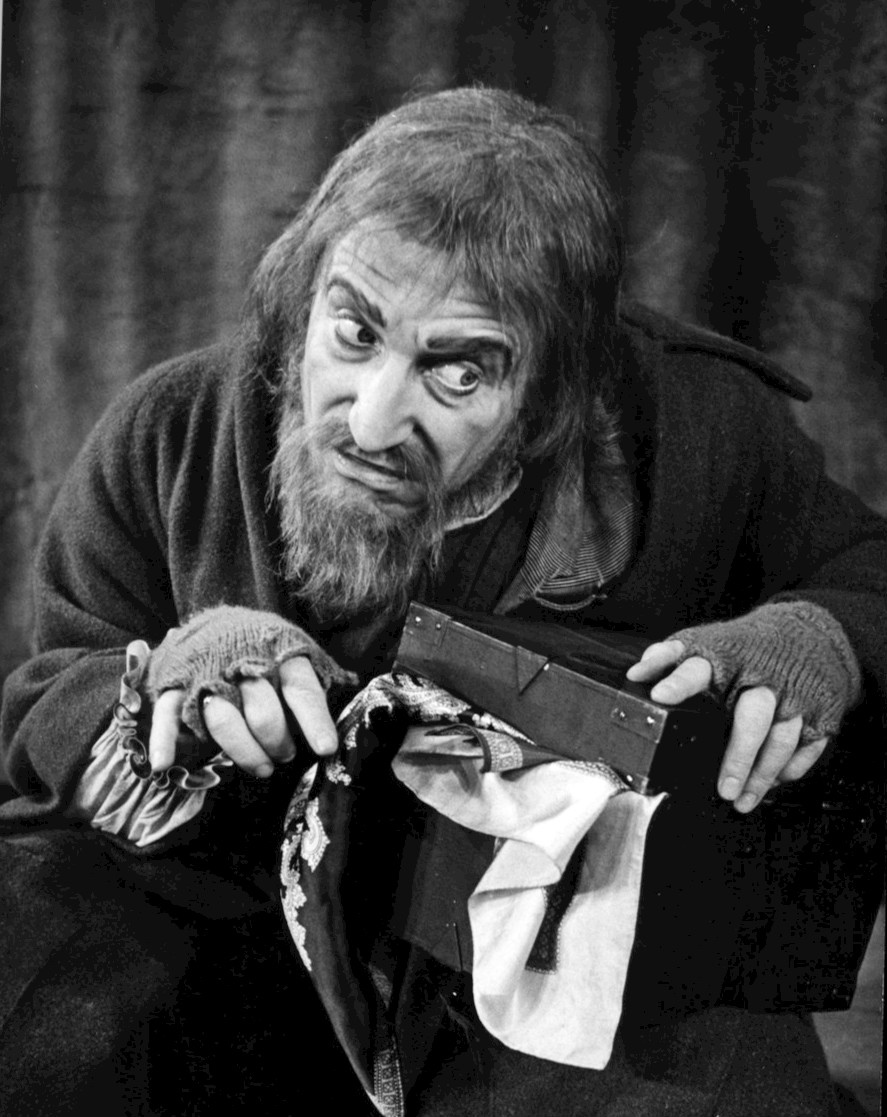
Clive Revill

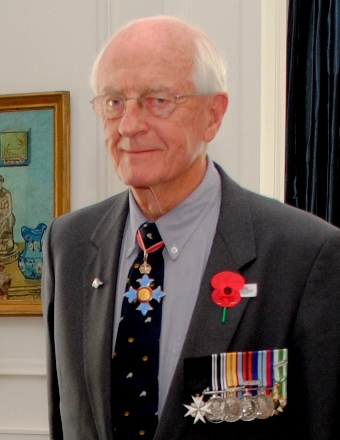
Brian McMahon

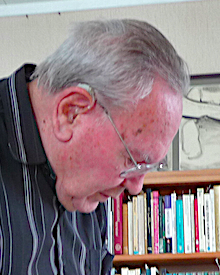
Gordon H. Brown

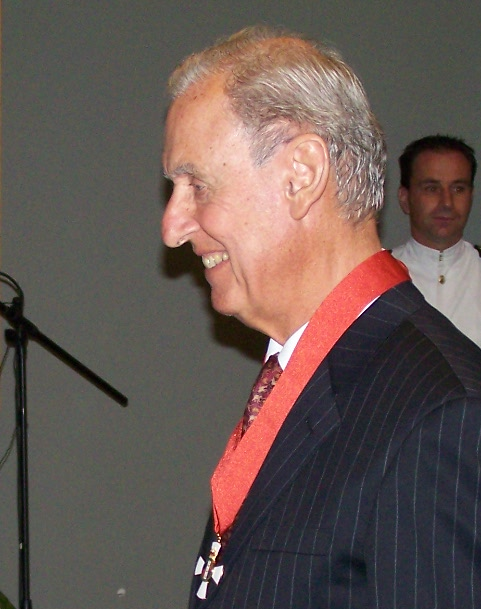
Ron Jones

=== April ===
- 3 April – Ted Hipkiss, cricketer (Northern Districts) (born 1947).
- 5 April
  - Raymond Hawthorne, actor (Mortimer's Patch, Bread and Roses, Shortland Street) and theatre director (Mercury Theatre, National Opera of New Zealand) (born 1936).
  - Di McCarthy, behavioural neuroscientist (University of Auckland), chief executive of the Royal Society of New Zealand Te Apārangi (2007–2014).
- 6 April
  - Sue Berry, physiotherapist and businesswoman, co-founder of Whitestone Cheese (1987) (born 1944).
  - Avis Fletcher, Olympic hurdler and sprinter (1964), British Empire and Commonwealth Games double bronze medallist (1962) (born 1938).
- 9 April
  - Nancy Carr, home economist (University of Otago) (born 1936).
  - John Mayhew, sports physician (All Blacks, North Harbour, New Zealand Warriors) (born 1954).
- 11 April – Robyn Kahukiwa, artist, children's writer and illustrator, Te Tohu mō Te Arikinui Dame Te Atairangikaahu (2020) (born 1938).
- 13 April
  - John Bradshaw, geologist (University of Canterbury), Fellow of the Royal Society of New Zealand (since 1999) (born 1939).
  - David Kernohan, architect and academic (Victoria University of Wellington) (born 1947).
- 14 April – Peter Matheson, theologian (University of Otago) (born 1938).
- 16 April – Roger McLachlan, rock bassist (Little River Band) (born 1954).
- 18 April – Bill Woods, local politician and community leader, Mayor of Selwyn (1992–1995) (born 1942).
- 19 April – Peter Hilt, politician, MP for Glenfield (1990–1996) (born 1942).
- 24 April
  - Trish Fraser, soil scientist (Plant & Food Research), New Zealand Women of Influence rural award (2020) (born 1966).
  - Roy Phillips, musician (The Saints, The Peddlers) (born 1941).
- 28 April – Owen Dolan, Roman Catholic prelate, coadjutor bishop of Palmerston North (1995–2004) (born 1928).
- 29 April
  - Janet Clews, school teacher, local politician and community leader, mayor of Glen Eden (1983–1989), Waitakere City Councillor (1989–2010) (born 1933).
  - Cherry Hankin, academic of English literature (University of Canterbury) (born 1937).
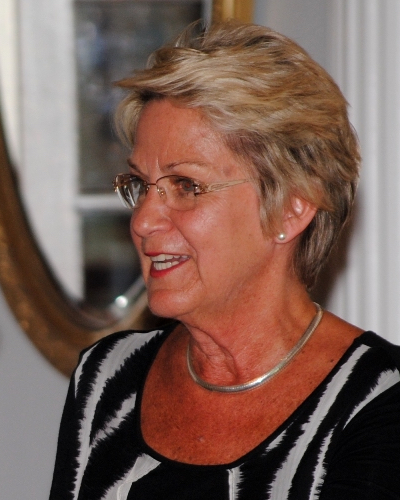
Di McCarthy

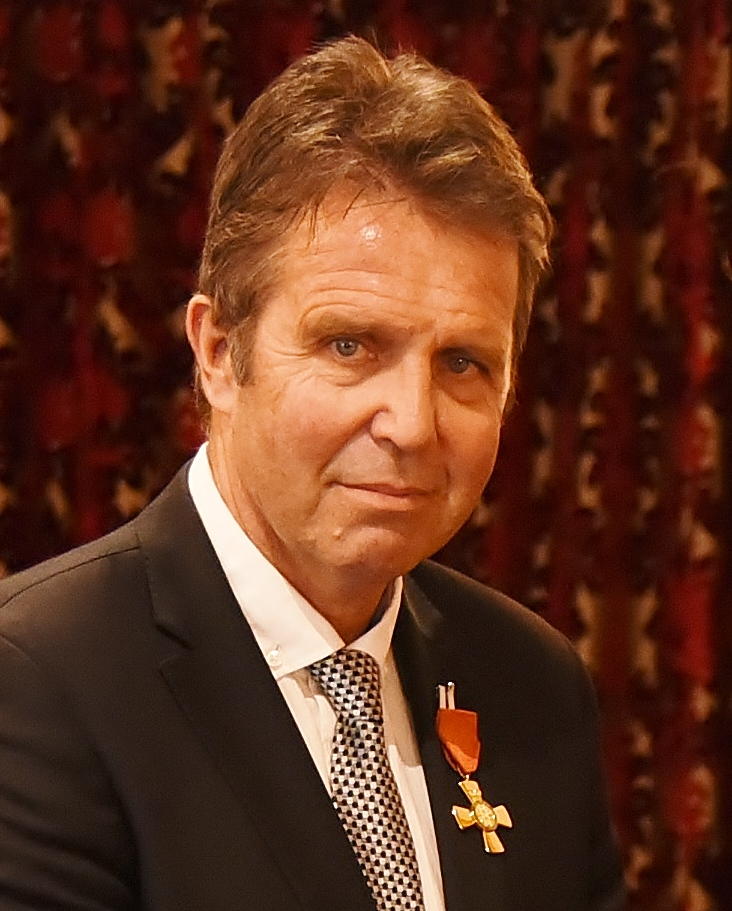
John Mayhew

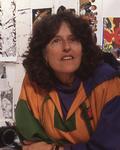
Robyn Kahukiwa

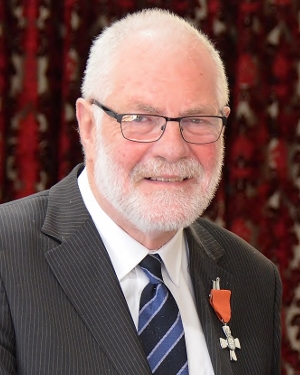
David Kernohan

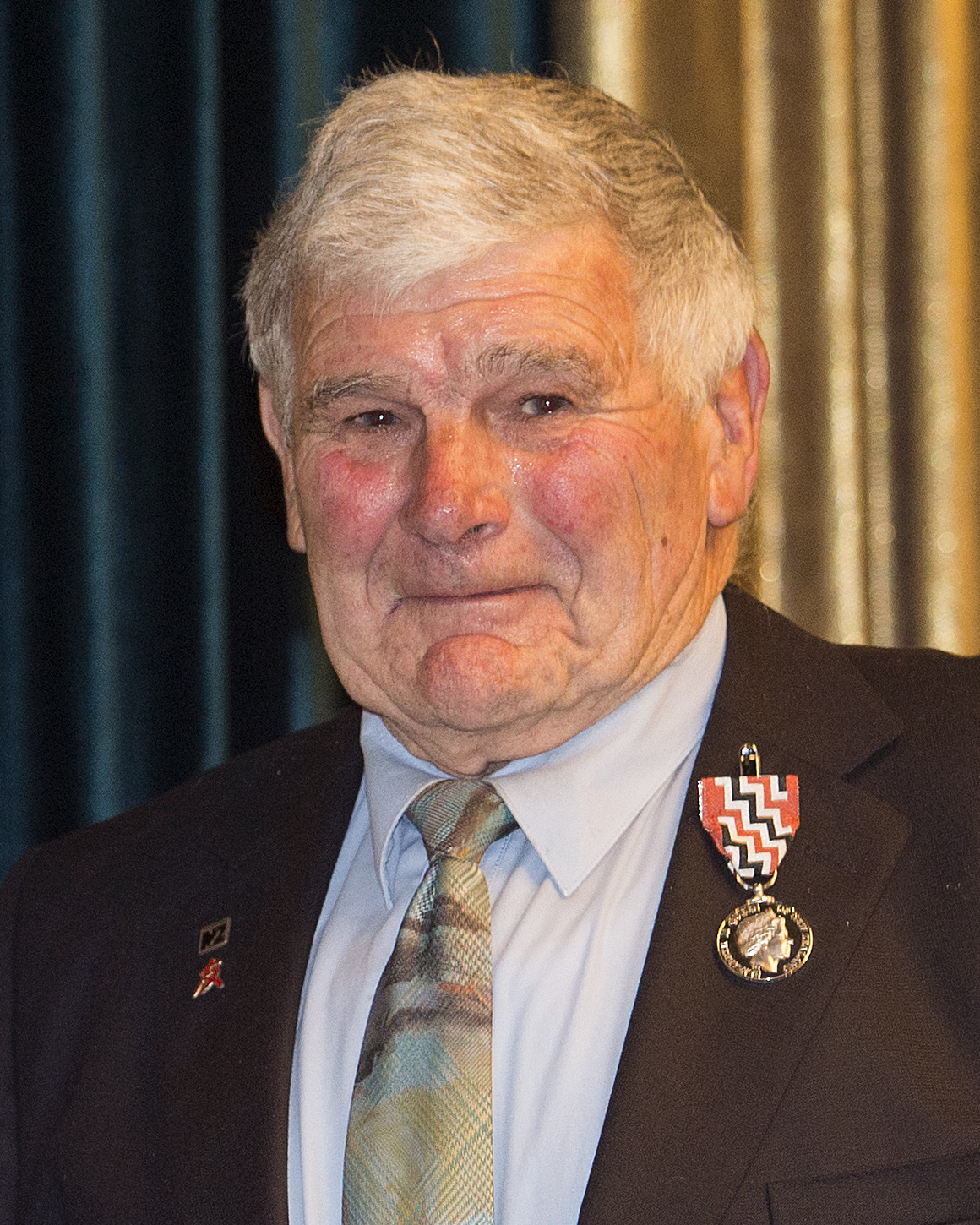
Bill Woods

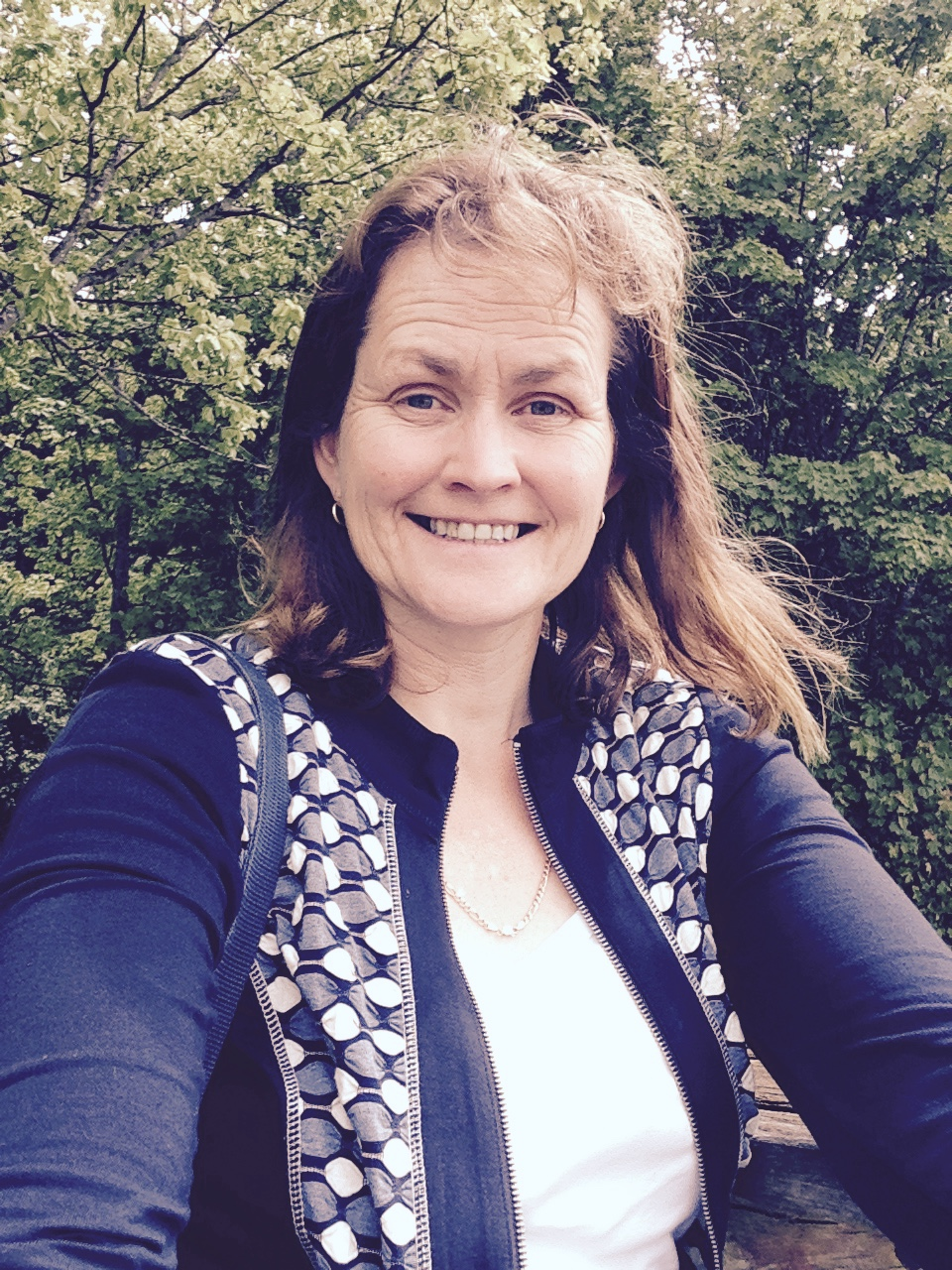
Trish Fraser

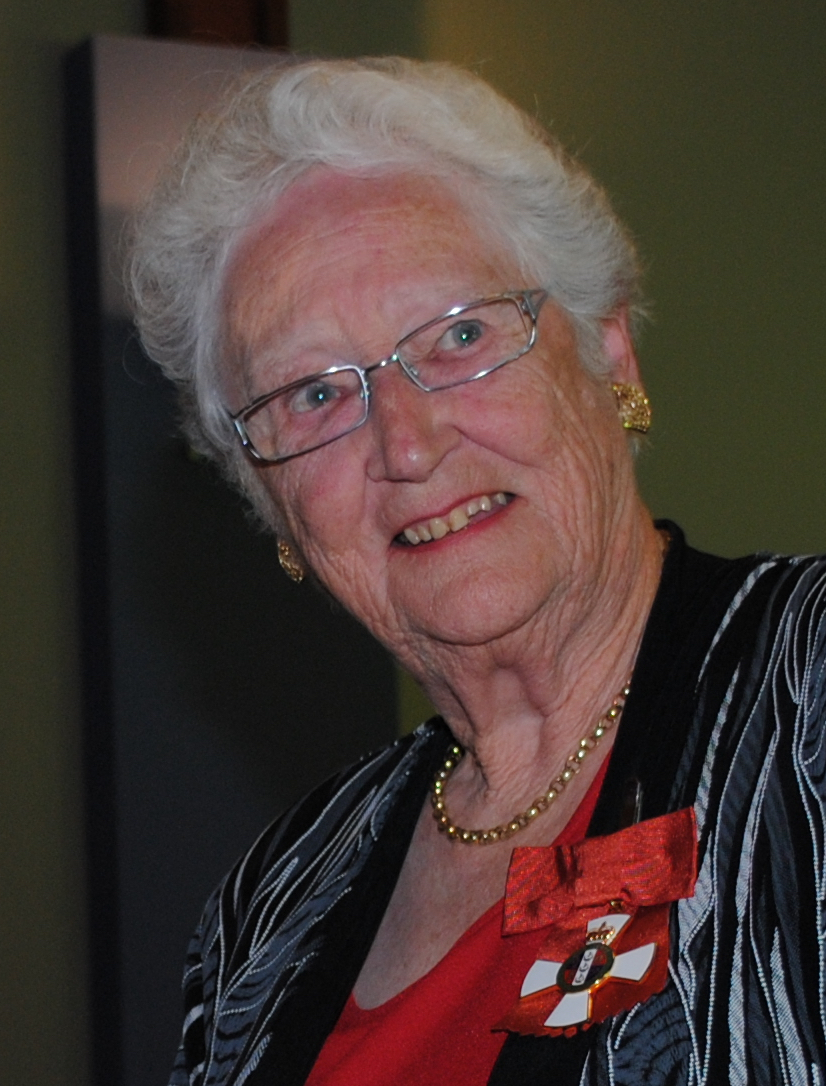
Janet Clews

=== May ===
- 1 May – Bob Brockie, biologist, cartoonist (National Business Review) and columnist (Dominion Post) (born 1932).
- 2 May – Sir Bob Jones, property magnate, writer, and politician, founder of the New Zealand Party (1983) (born 1939).
- 5 May
  - Shane Richardson, motorcycle racer (born c. 1996).
  - Shane Solomon, lawyer and Māori leader (Waikato Tainui) (born 1963).
- 6 May – Bill McCaw, rugby union player (Southland, national team), oldest living All Black (since 2023) (born 1927).
- 9 May – Fred Graham, rugby union player (New Zealand Māori), educator and sculptor, Te Tohu mō Te Arikinui Dame Te Atairangikaahu (2017), Arts Foundation of New Zealand Icon (since 2018) (born 1928).
- 13 May – Danny Lendich, businessman and midget car racing team owner, introduced Wendy's to New Zealand (1988) (born 1944).
- 14 May – Lionel Hill-Smith, Empire Games hurdler (1950) (born 1929).
- 15 May – Durham Havill, local politician and businessman, Mayor of Westland (1989–1998) (born 1944).
- 16 May – Tuppy Diack, rugby union player (Otago, Southland, national team) and administrator, president of the Otago Rugby Football Union (2005) (born 1930).
- 17 May – Clive Rennie, educator, principal of Rangitikei College (1986–1991), Mountainview High School (1997–2000) and Otago Boys' High School (2000–2014) (born 1944).
- 18 May – John Simpson, silversmith and fine arts academic (University of Canterbury) (born 1925).
- 21 May – Frank Gibson Jr., jazz drummer and drum tutor (born 1946).
- 23 May – Roger Bridge, businessman and political party official (National) (born 1958).
- 24 May – Andrew Shaw, children's television presenter, television director and producer (South Pacific Television, TVNZ), and media executive (TVNZ, South Pacific Pictures, NZ On Air) (born 1957).
- 29 May – David Trist, cricketer (Canterbury) and cricket coach (Eastern Province, national team) (born 1947).
- 30 May – John Pike, lawyer, King's Counsel (since 2013) (born 1944).
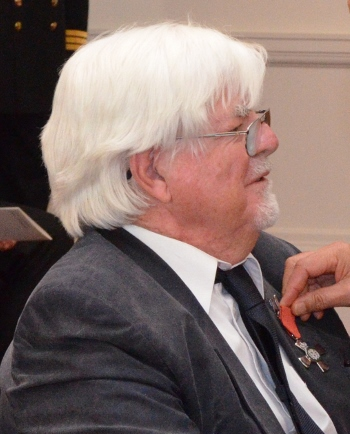
Bob Brockie

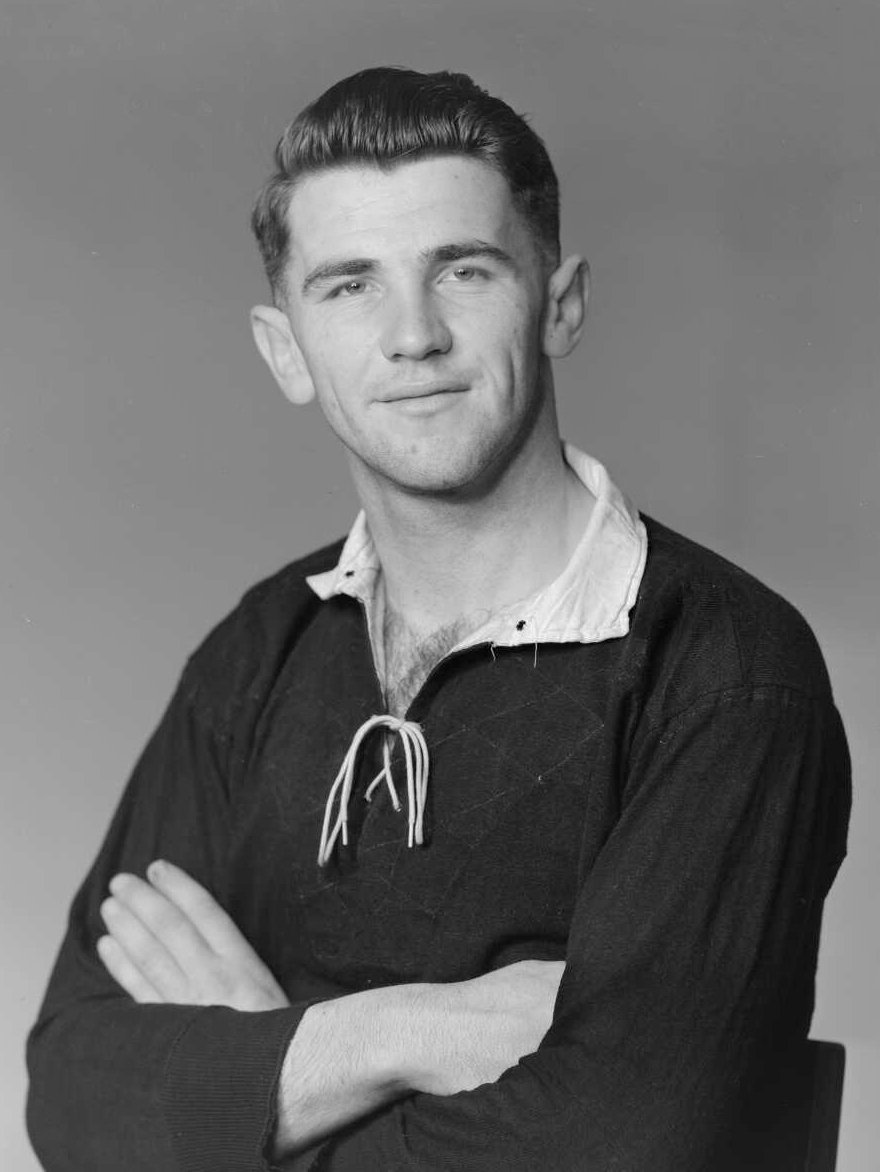
Bill McCaw

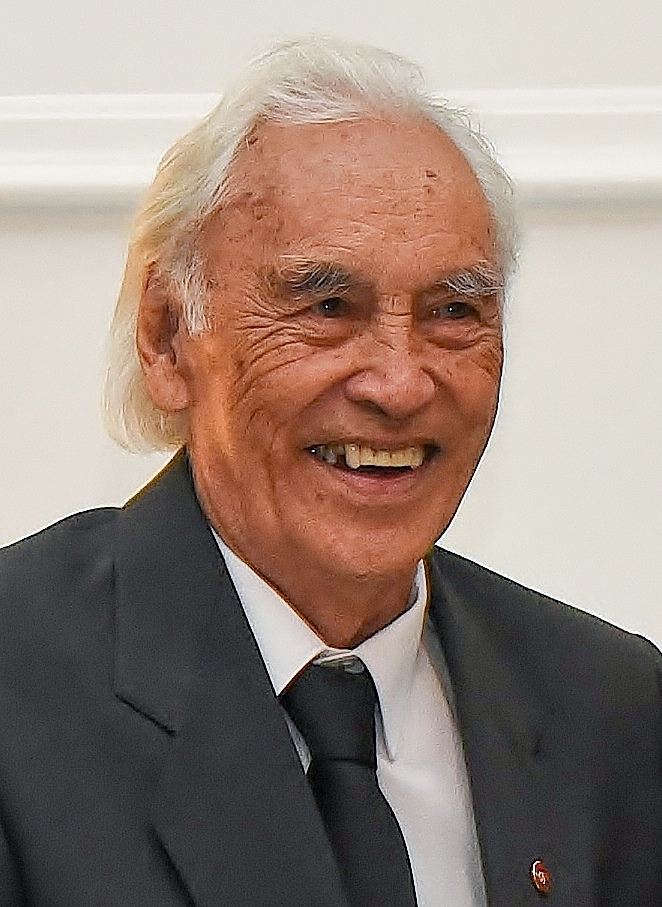
Fred Graham

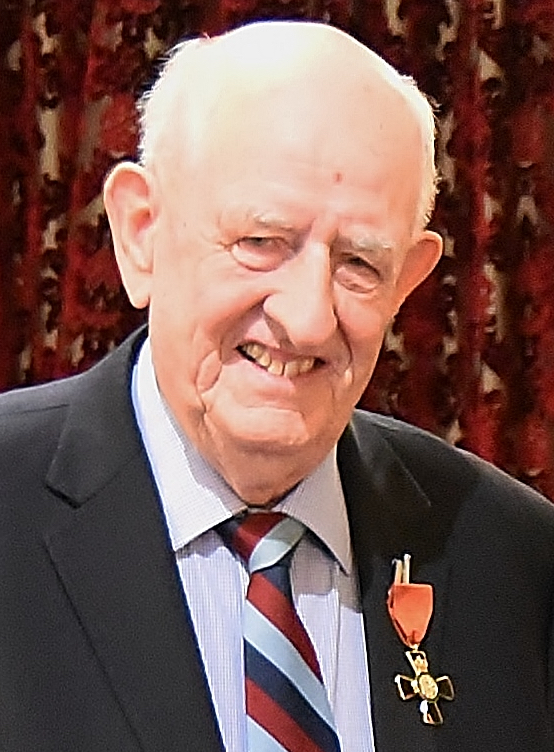
Durham Havill

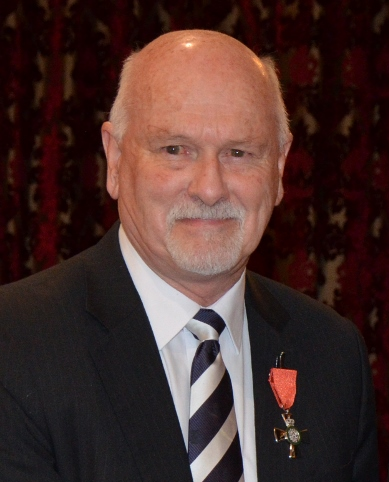
Clive Rennie

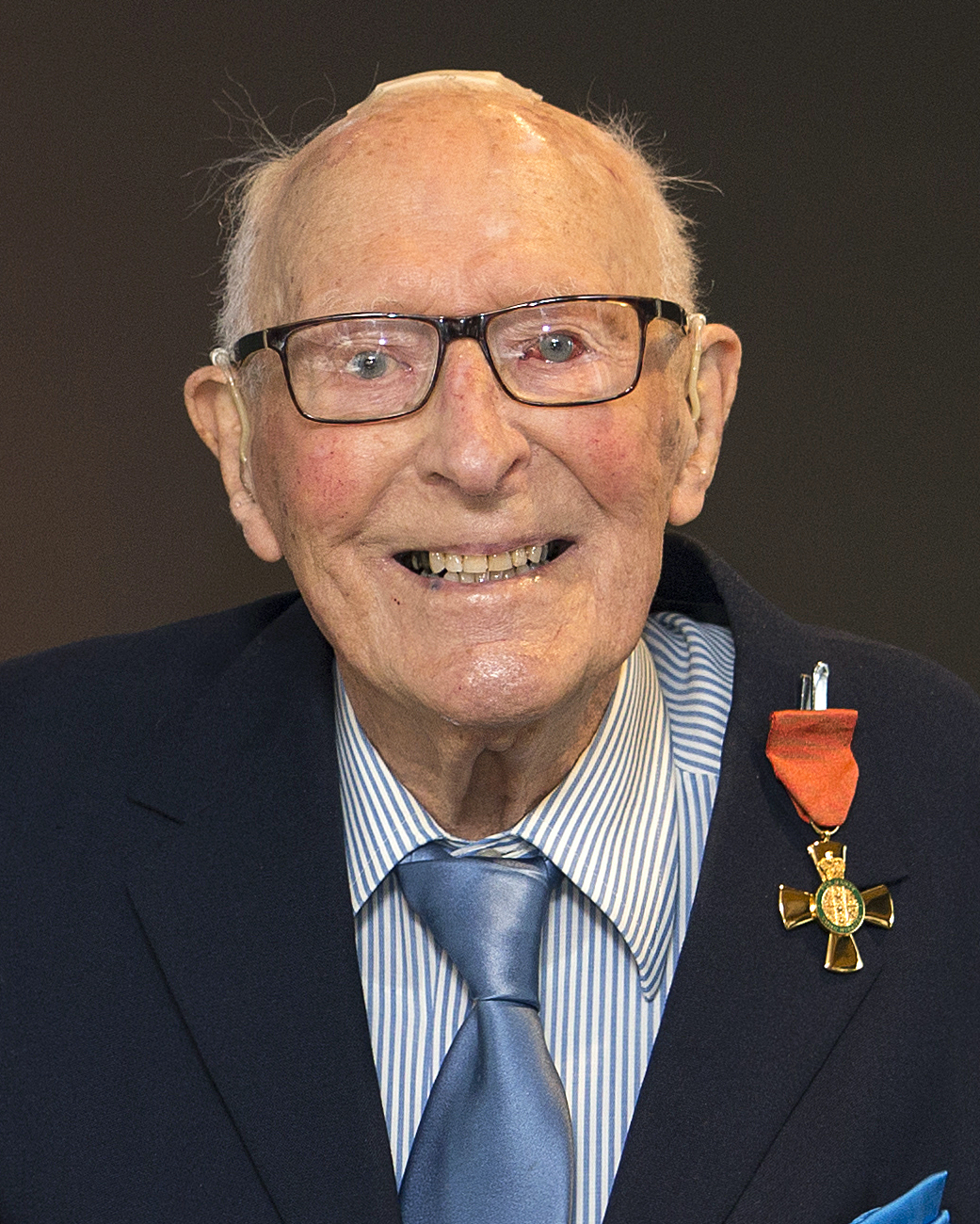
John Simpson

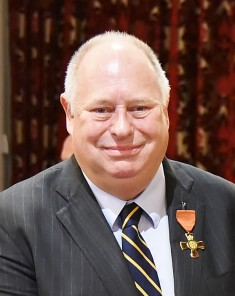
Roger Bridge

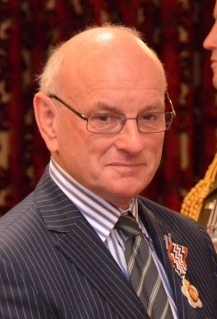
John Pike

=== June ===
- 1 June – Robert Anderson, cricketer (Otago, Central Districts, national team) (born 1948).
- 4 June
  - Edwin Perry, politician, New Zealand First list MP (2002–2005), Masterton District Councillor (2007–2010) (born 1948).
  - Bruce Stewart, lawyer, Rhodes Scholar (1975), King's Counsel (since 2000) (born 1953).
- 6 June – Marise Wipani, beauty pageant contestant, actor (Came a Hot Friday, Shortland Street, Soldier Soldier), and television presenter (Lotto) (born 1964).
- 7 June – David Lean, local politician, Mayor of New Plymouth (1980–1992), Taranaki Regional Councillor (since 1989) (born 1948).
- 8 June
  - Anthony Reid, historian (Australian National University, UCLA, National University of Singapore) (born 1939).
  - Stu Wilson, rugby union player (Wellington, national team) and television commentator (born 1954).
- 10 June – Roka Ngarimu-Cameron, tohunga raranga and traditional Māori arts academic (University of Otago) (born 1948).
- 12 June
  - Maurice Gee, novelist (Under the Mountain, In My Father's Den, Plumb), Arts Foundation of New Zealand Icon (since 2003) (born 1931).
  - Phil Silva, psychologist and paediatrician (University of Otago), founder (1972) and director (1972–1999) of the Dunedin Study (born 1940).
  - Sir Cliff Skeggs, Hall of Fame businessman and local politician, Mayor of Dunedin (1977–1989) (born 1931).
- 14 June – Lorraine Barry, music manager (Dave Dobbyn, Ice-T, Spice Girls) (born c. 1958).
- 15 June – Barry Vercoe, computer scientist (Massachusetts Institute of Technology) and composer, inventor of Csound (1985) (born 1937).
- 21 June – Harry Watson, artist and poet (born 1965).
- 24 June – Garry Ahern, sports broadcaster (Radio New Zealand) (born 1949).
- 26 June
  - Takutai Tarsh Kemp, politician, MP for Tāmaki Makaurau (since 2023) (born 1975)
  - Robbie Stuart, rugby union player (Hawke's Bay, national team) and coach (Hawke's Bay) (born 1948).
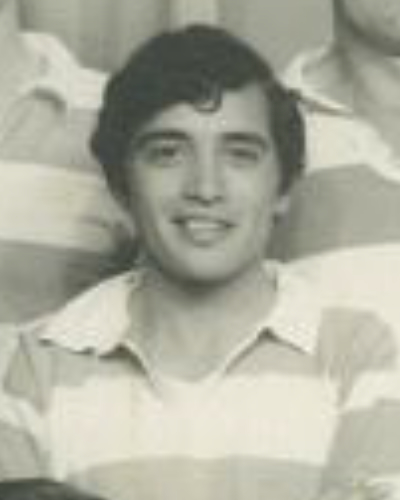
Edwin Perry

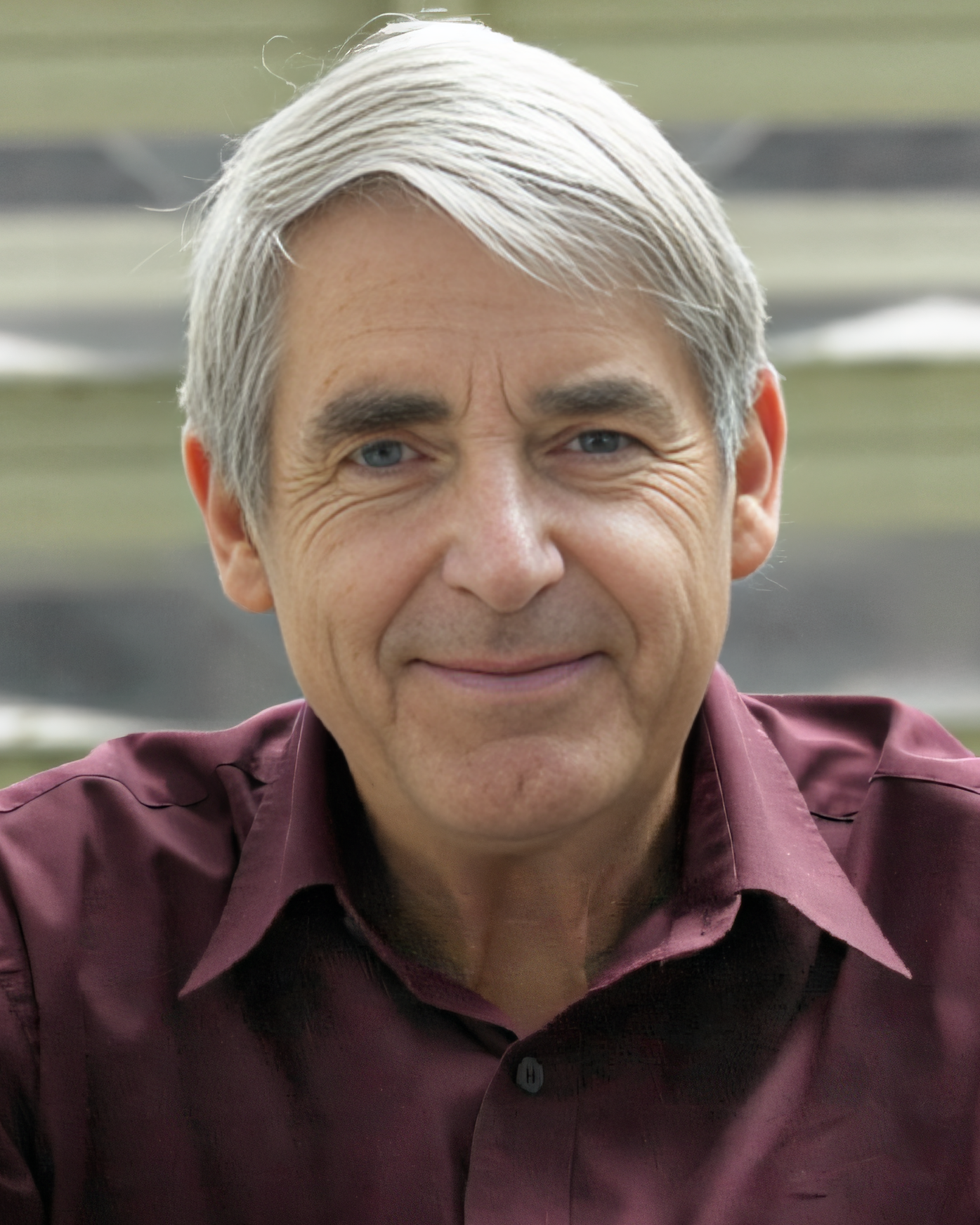
Anthony Reid

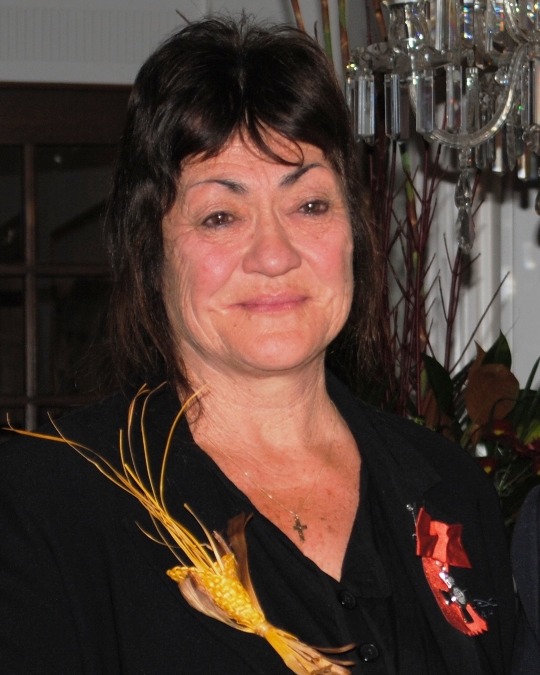
Roka Ngarimu‑Cameron

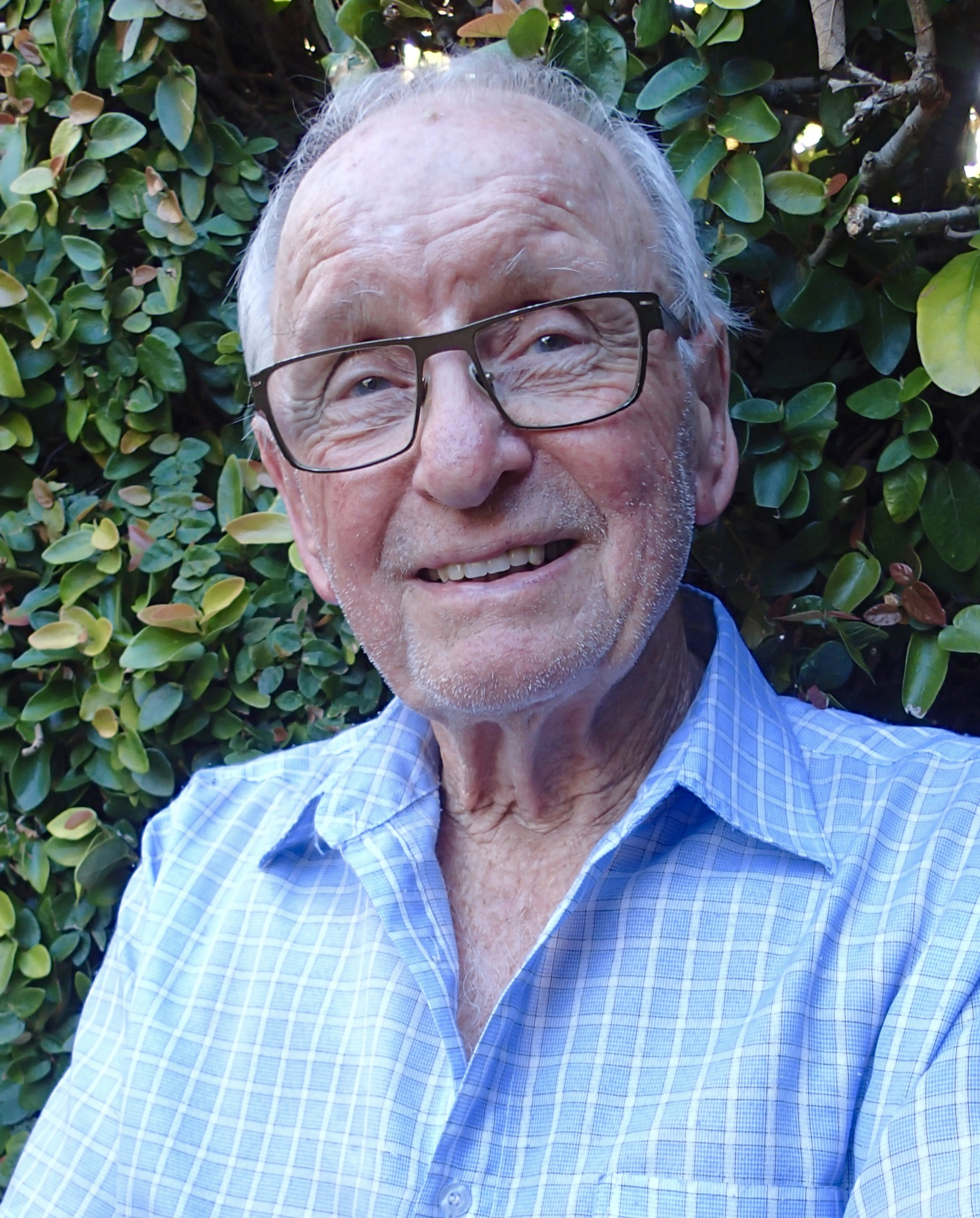
Maurice Gee

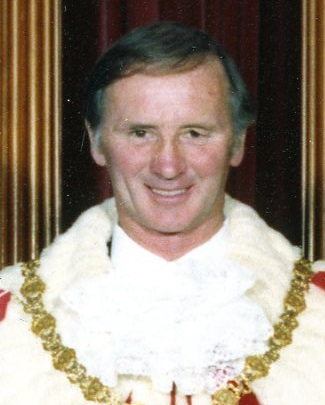
Sir Cliff Skeggs

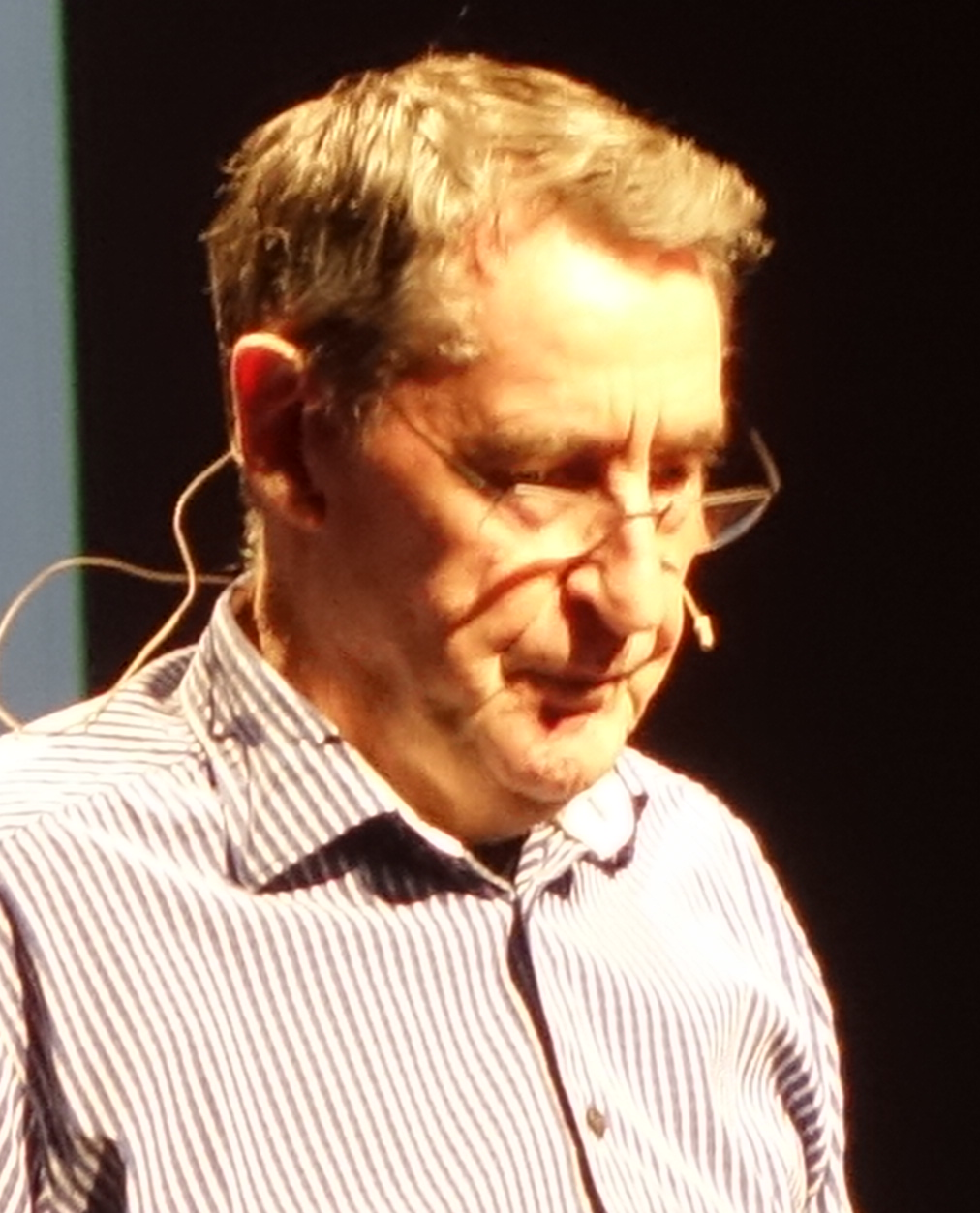
Barry Vercoe

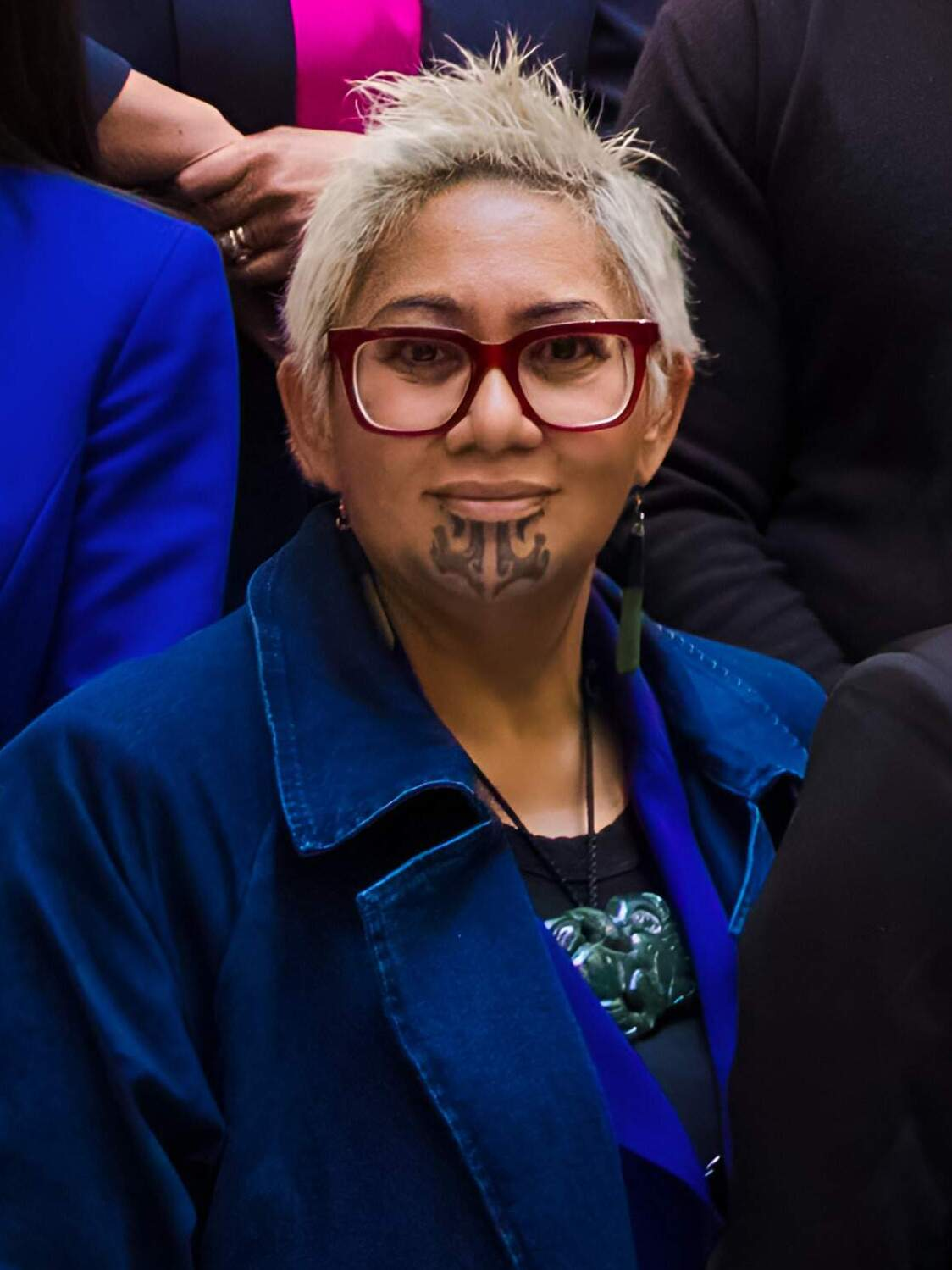
Takutai Tarsh Kemp

=== July ===
- 1 July – Dennis Lattimer, muralist (born 1946).
- 2 July – Des Gorman, diving and hyperbaric medicine specialist (University of Auckland) and health bureaucrat (born 1953).
- 3 July
  - Terry Brown, brothel owner (born 1956/1957). (death announced on this date)
  - Hilary Stace, disability and autism advocate, eugenics researcher (born 1954)
- 5 July – Tim Bray, actor, comedian, and children's theatre founder (born 1964).
- 6 July – Kay Bradford, child and adolescent psychiatrist (born 1930).
- 9 July – Bruce Harris, legal academic (University of Otago, University of Auckland).
- 11 July
  - Bert Brownlie, economist (University of Auckland, University of Canterbury) and university administrator, University of Canterbury vice-chancellor (1977–1998) (born 1932).
  - Alex McNabb, mathematician (DSIR), Fellow of the Royal Society of New Zealand (since 1985) (born 1930).
- 12 July – Heather Roe, field hockey player (national team) (born 1939).
- 15 July – Neill Price, firefighter, local politician and community leader, Waimakariri District Councillor (1989–1998) (born 1936).
- 16 July
  - Chris Faiumu, musician (Fat Freddy's Drop) and reggae-dub producer.
  - Bruce McTavish, boxing referee (born 1940).
  - Andrew Oliver, oldest person known to have survived with Fryns–Aftimos syndrome (born c. 1984).
- 17 July
  - Barrie Downey, business executive (Fletcher Challenge) (born 1930).
  - Don McIntosh, rugby union player (Wellington, national team) (born 1931).
  - Greer Twiss, sculptor (Karangahape Rocks) and educator (University of Auckland), Arts Foundation of New Zealand Icon (since 2011) (born 1937).
  - Daphne Walker, singer (born 1930).
- 19 July – Lee Mummery, cricketer (Central Districts) (born 1935).
- 20 July – Jim Tomlin, artist, musician (Chants R&B), and art educator (Otago Polytechnic) (born 1940).
- 23 July – Kathryn Smits, Germanist (University of Auckland) (born 1935).
- 25 July – Ian Leggat, school teacher and university administrator, principal of Hagley High School (1971–1976) and Christchurch Boys' High School (1976–1988), University of Canterbury chancellor (1992–1998) (born 1929).
- 26 July
  - Ian Carter, sociologist (University of Auckland) (born 1943).
  - Keith Sorrenson, historian (University of Auckland), president of the Citizens' Association for Racial Equality (1971–1973), member of the Waitangi Tribunal (1986–2011) (born 1932).
  - John Werry, child and adolescent psychiatrist (University of Auckland) (born 1931).
- 29 July – Sir Michael Hill, jeweller, businessman (Michael Hill Jeweller), and philanthropist (born 1938).
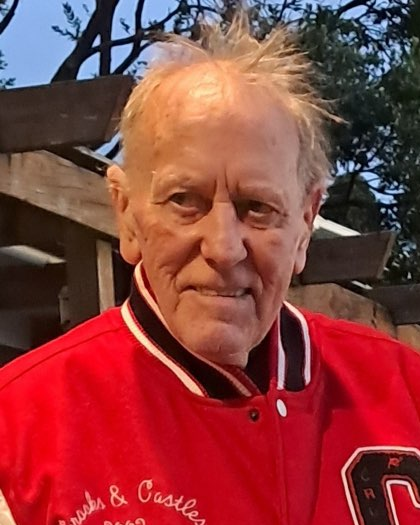
Dennis Lattimer

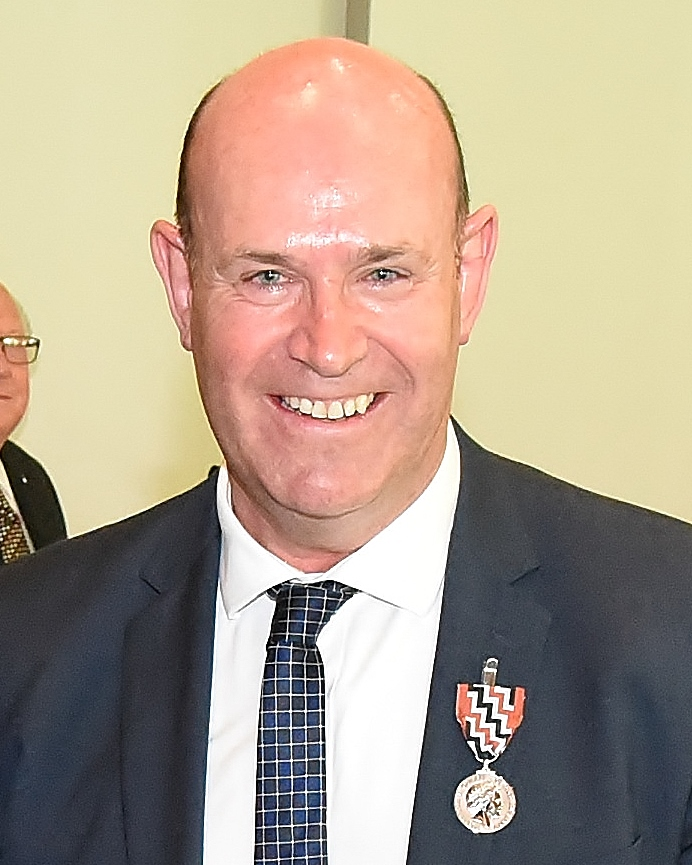
Tim Bray

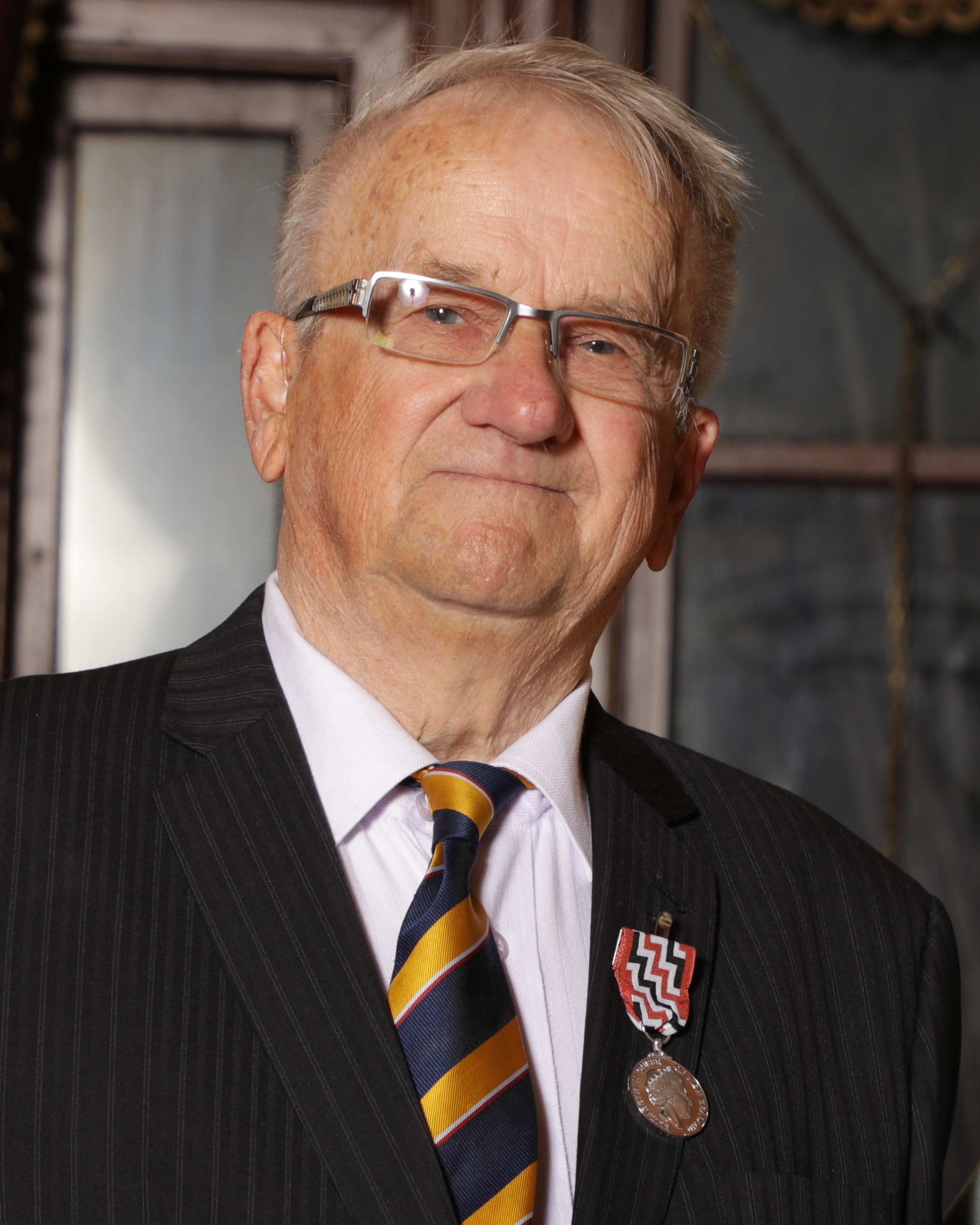
Neill Price

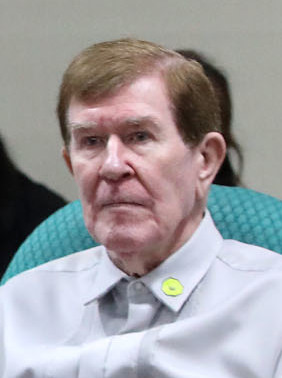
Bruce McTavish

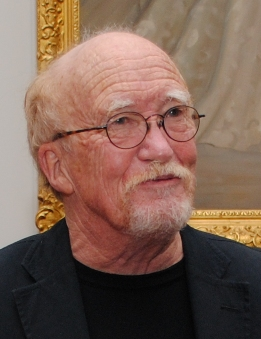
Greer Twiss

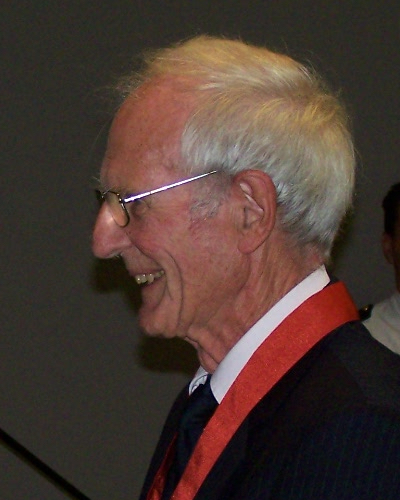
John Werry

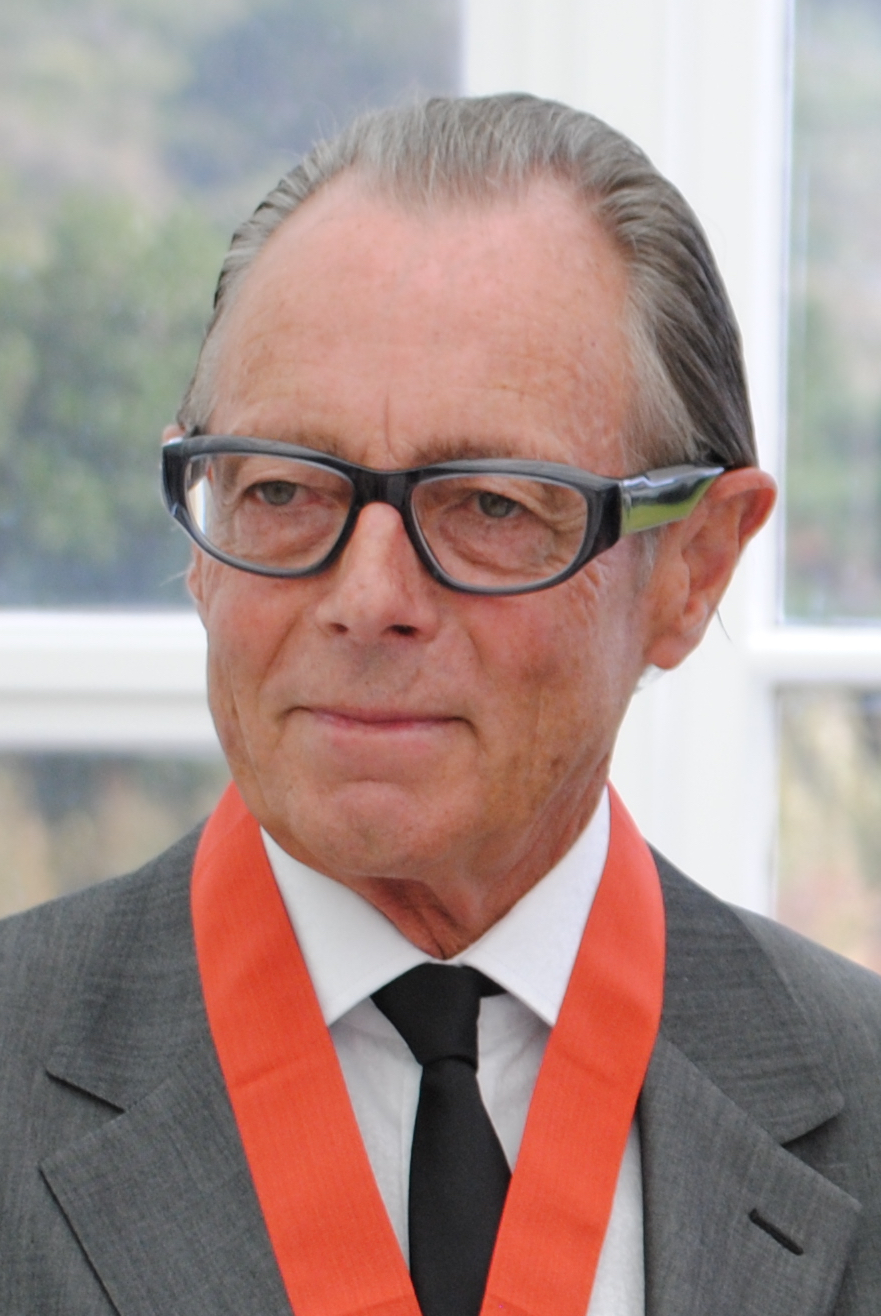
Sir Michael Hill

=== August ===
- 6 August – Tom O'Connor, journalist, author, senior citizens' advocate and local politician, president of Grey Power (2016–2018), Waimate District Councillor (since 2013) (born 1944).
- 8 August
  - Judy Bailey, pianist, composer, jazz musician and educator (Sydney Conservatorium of Music), and television presenter (Play School) (born 1935).
  - Peter Lester, sailor, sailing coach and commentator, OK dinghy world champion (1977), Admiral's Cup winner (1987, 1993) (born 1954).
- 10 August – Patrick Waddington, Russian linguist, literary critic and historian (Victoria University of Wellington) (born 1934).
- 13 August – Grant Tavinor, philosopher (Lincoln University) (born c. 1973).
- 15 August – John Rowan, lawyer, King's Counsel (since 1997) (born 1944).
- 16 August – Janet Grieve, biological oceanographer (New Zealand Oceanographic Institute, NIWA), New Zealand Association of Scientists president (1998–2000), World Association of Copepodologists president (2008–2011) (born 1940).
- 17 August – John Bartley, cinematographer (Lost, The X Files, The Chronicles of Riddick), Emmy Award (1996) (born 1947).
- 18 August
  - Lloyd Ashby, rugby union player (Southland, national team) (born 1931).
  - Lindsay Sparks, cricketer (Central Districts, Auckland) and rugby union player (Marlborough) (born 1944).
- 19 August – Tony Smith, legal scholar (University of Reading, University of Cambridge, Victoria University of Wellington) (born 1947).
- 21 August
  - Evelyn Attwood, tennis player (born 1924).
  - Keith Nelson, rugby union player (Otago, Auckland, national team) and dentist (born 1938).
  - Louise Rummel, nurse and nursing educator (Manukau Institute of Technology) (born 1937).
- 22 August
  - Denis Cameron, rugby union player (Mid Canterbury, Counties, national team) (born 1938).
  - Michael Henderson, fencer, British Empire and Commonwealth Games bronze medallist (1962) (born 1935).
- 23 August – John Roy-Wojciechowski, Polish community leader and philanthropist (born 1933).
- 24 August – John Barnett, film and television producer (Footrot Flats: The Dog's Tale, Whale Rider, Sione's Wedding) (born 1945).
- 27 August
  - Shane Christie, rugby union player (Tasman, Highlanders, Māori All Blacks) (born 1985).
  - Dame Peggy Koopman-Boyden, gerontologist (University of Waikato) (born 1943).
- 29 August – Jay Shaw, philosopher (Victoria University of Wellington) (born 1941).
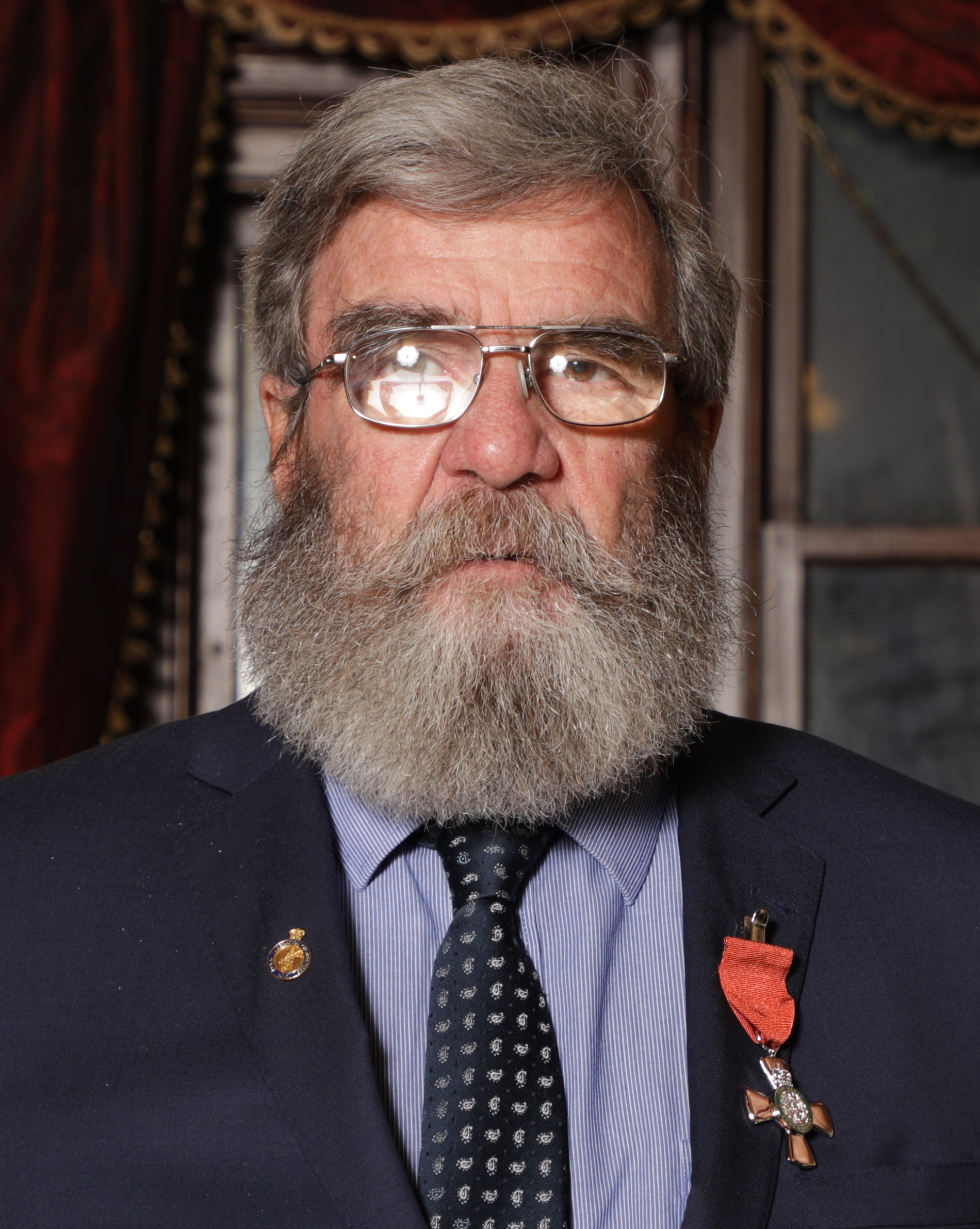
Tom O'Connor

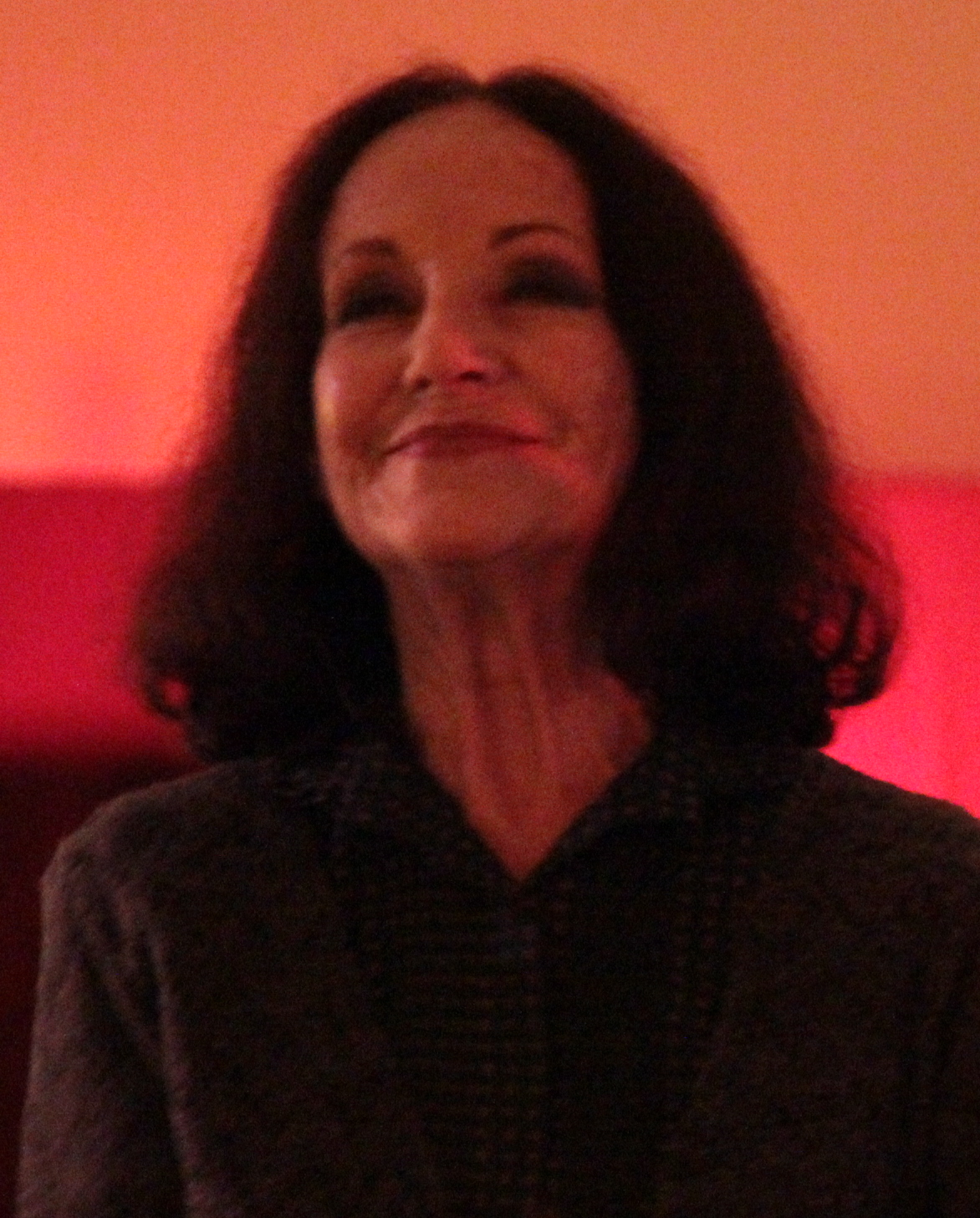
Judy Bailey

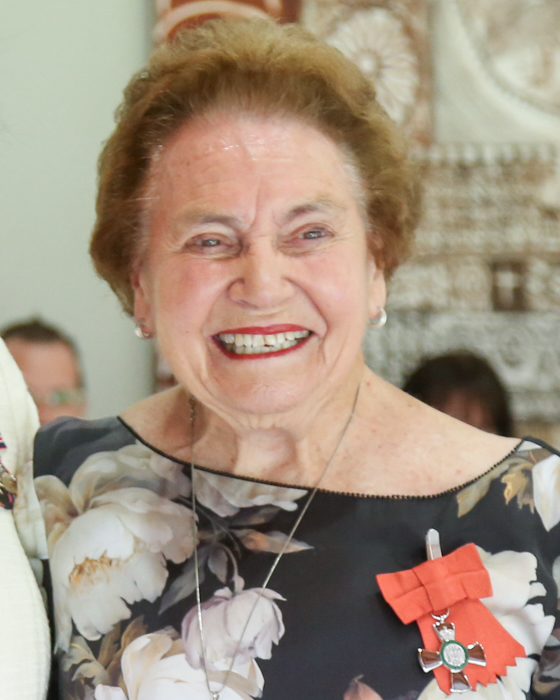
Louise Rummel

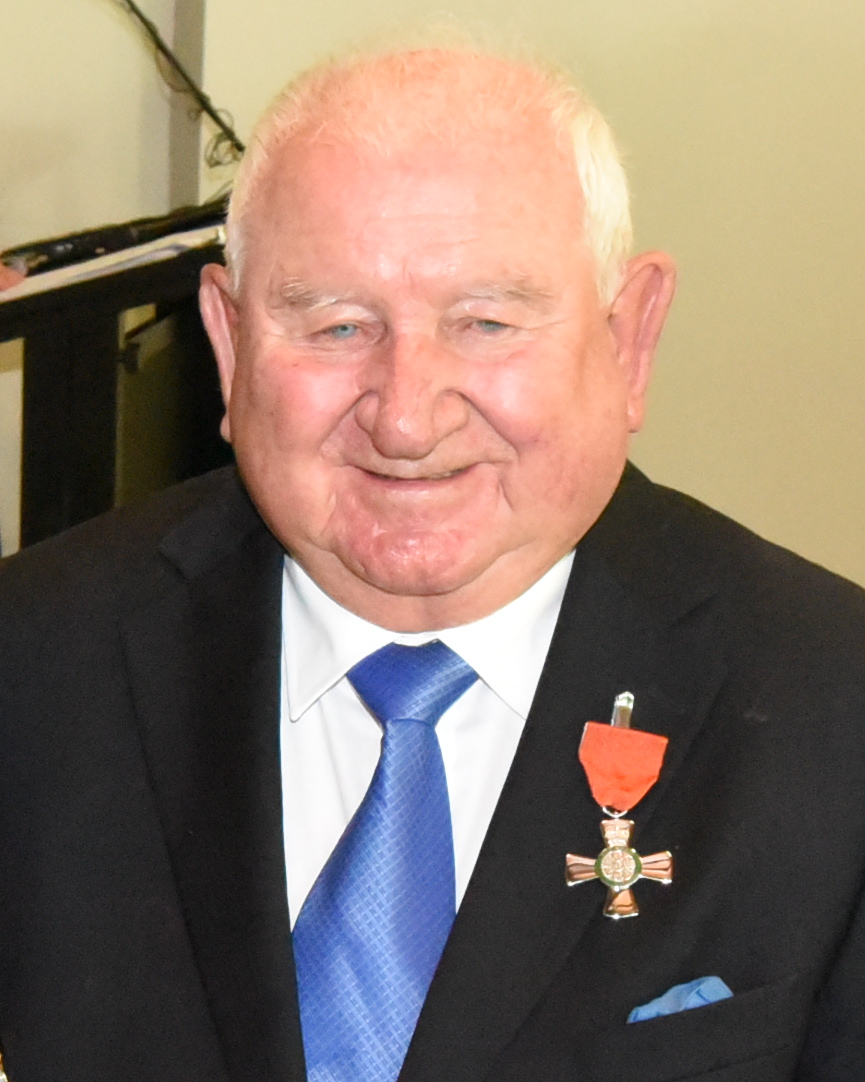
John Roy‑Wojciechowski

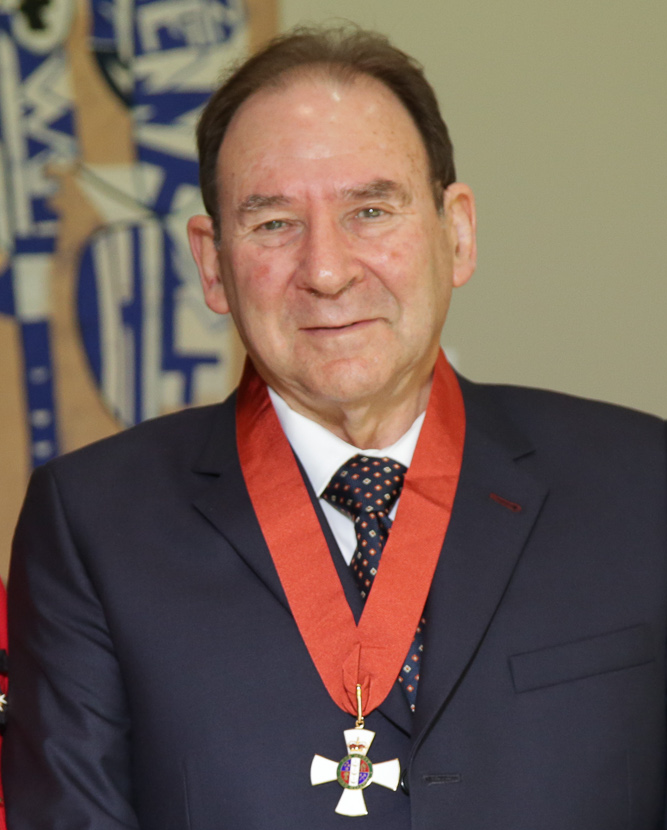
John Barnett

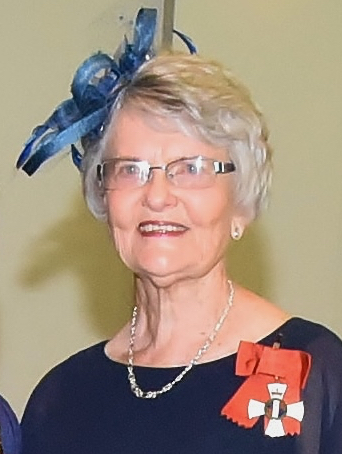
Dame Peggy Koopman‑Boyden

=== September ===
- 1 September
  - Kelly Ana Morey, novelist and poet (born 1968)
  - Peter Truscott, cricketer (Canterbury, Wellington, national team) (born 1941).
- 2 September – David H. Clark, astrophysicist (Rutherford Appleton Laboratory) and science administrator (SERC, EPSRC).
- 4 September – Maxine Arnold, local politician, Porirua City Councillor (1974–1992), Wellington Regional Councillor (1980–1995), first women elected to a licensing trust (1968) (born 1928).
- 6 September – Dame Pat Harrison, educationalist and local politician, principal of Queen's High School, Dunedin (1975–1994), University of Otago council member (1983–1994), Otago Regional Councillor (born 1932).
- 7 September
  - Robin Chadwick, actor (Julius Caesar, The Brothers) (born 1939).
  - John Irwin, psychologist (University of Auckland) (born 1934).
- 8 September – Tom Phillips, fugitive father who disappeared with his three children between 2021 and 2025.
- 9 September
  - David Buckingham, physical chemist (Australian National University, University of Otago), Fellow of the Royal Society of New Zealand (since 1980) (born 1936).
  - Charlie Cotton, basketball player (national team) (born 1943).
- 10 September – Stan Martin, rugby league player (Richmond Rovers) and coach (Whitehaven, Cook Islands, women's national team) (born 1953).
- 11 September
  - Randall Morton, otolaryngologist (University of Auckland) (born 1947).
  - Graham Young, educator, principal of Tauranga Boys' College (1985–2008).
- 12 September – Bill Wilson, lawyer and judge, judge of the Court of Appeal (2007–2008) and Supreme Court (2008–2010), King's Counsel (since 1996) (born 1946).
- 13 September – Stan Simpson, wool scientist (WRONZ) and science administrator, director of WRONZ (1978–1992) (born 1933).
- 14 September – Barry Roberts, cricketer (Northern Districts) (born 1946).
- 16 September
  - Judy Tinnock, tennis player, Wimbledon mixed doubles semi-finalist (1954) (born 1931).
  - Jack Williams, cricketer (Canterbury) (born 1931).
- 17 September
  - Tenick Dennison, paediatrician, conservationist and ornithologist (born 1927).
  - Jim Easton, oldest living man in New Zealand (108 years, 279 days), oldest living Australian World War II veteran (born 1916).
  - Dame Joan Metge, social anthropologist (University of Auckland, Victoria University of Wellington), Te Rangi Hiroa Medal (1997) (born 1930).
- 20 September – Tui Te Rupe, Paralympic marathon runner (1988) (born 1943).
- 21 September
  - Stu Freebairn, rugby union player (Manawatu, national team) (born 1932).
  - William E. Shepard, religious studies academic (University of Canterbury) (born 1933).
- 22 September
  - Ian Farquhar, maritime historian, businessman and local politician, chair of the Otago Harbour Board (1980–1983) (born 1931).
  - Grant Hawke, Māori leader (Ngāti Whātua Ōrākei) (born 1944).
- 23 September
  - Bruce Morrison, cricketer (Wellington, national team) (born 1933).
  - Sir Tumu Te Heuheu, Māori leader, paramount chief of Ngāti Tūwharetoa (since 1997) (born 1941).
- 25 September
  - Glynn Jones, physicist (University of Canterbury) (born 1936).
  - David Russell, consumer advocate, chief executive of Consumer NZ (1990–2007) (born 1942).
- 30 September – Nigel Latta, clinical psychologist and television host (Beyond the Darklands, The Politically Incorrect Parenting Show, Nigel Latta Blows Stuff Up) (born 1967).
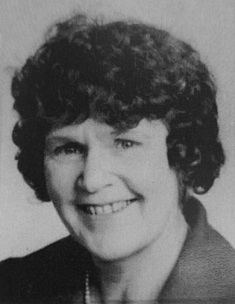
Maxine Arnold

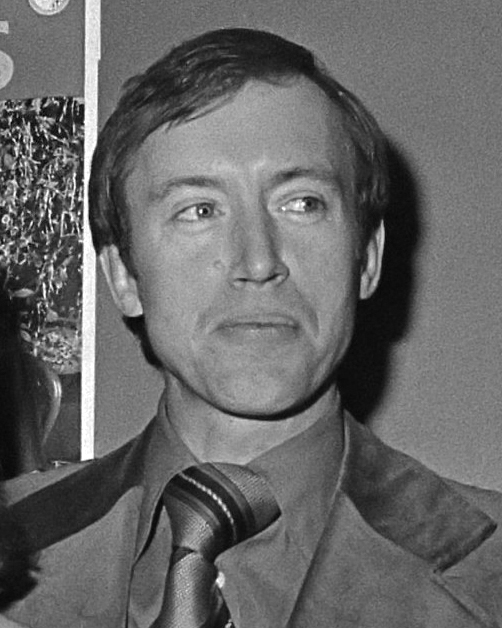
Robin Chadwick

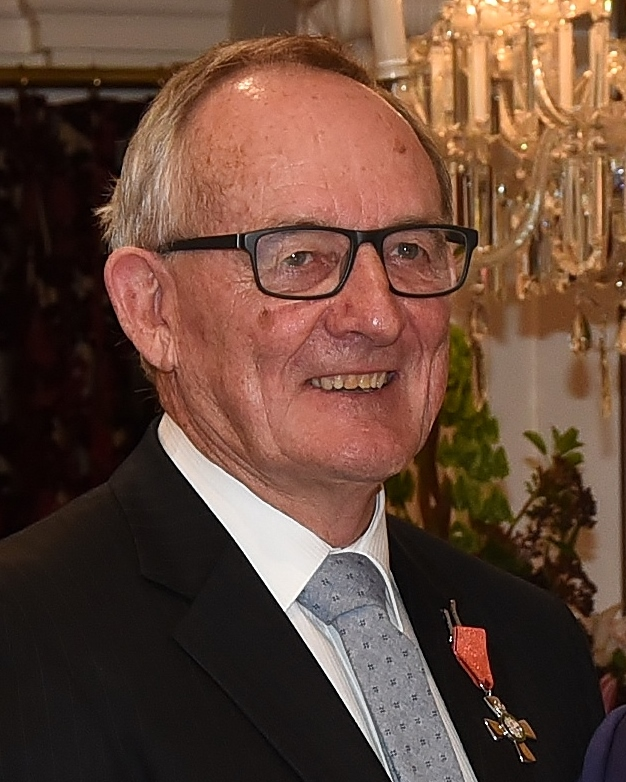
Graham Young

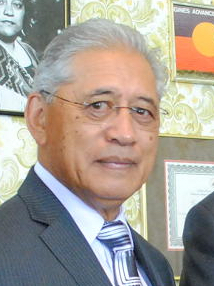
Sir Tumu Te Heuheu

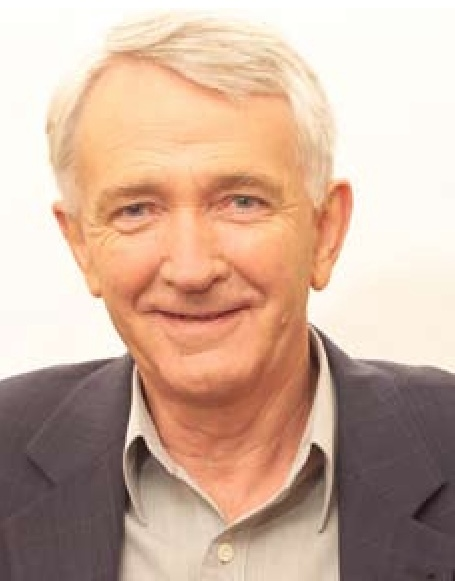
David Russell

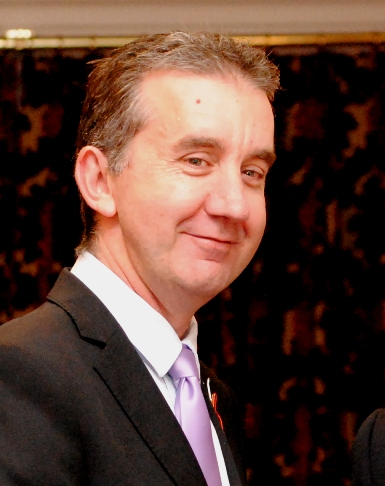
Nigel Latta

=== October ===
- 1 October – John Braggins, botanist and bryologist (University of Auckland, Auckland War Memorial Museum) (born 1944).
- 2 October – Mac Gardner, clinical geneticist (University of Otago, University of Melbourne) (born 1942).
- 4 October – Gordon Keys, atmospheric scientist (DSIR, NIWA), Royal Society of New Zealand Science and Technology Silver Medal (1995) (born 1930).
- 6 October – Margaret, Lady Liley, paediatrician, general practitioner and farmer (born 1928).
- 7 October – Graham Bell, police officer and television presenter (Police Ten 7) (born 1946).
- 8 October – Wally Yovich, businessman, local politician and philanthropist, Whangārei District Councillor (1989–1995) (born 1939).
- 9 October – Cliff Tait, aviator, politician and writer, Hamilton City Councillor (1992–1995) (born 1929).
- 10 October – Roger Harris, cricketer (Auckland, national team) (born 1933).
- 11 October – Richard Nottage, diplomat and public servant, ambassador to Indonesia (1980–1982) and Japan (1987–1988), permanent representative to the UN in Geneva (1984–1987), Secretary of Foreign Affairs and Trade (1991–1999) (born 1939).
- 15 October – Jim Bolger, politician, MP for King Country (1975–1996) and Taranaki-King Country (1996–1998), Minister of Labour (1978–1984), leader of the National Party (1986–1997), Prime Minister (1990–1997), Ambassador to the United States (1998–2002), chancellor of the University of Waikato (2007–2019), Privy Counsellor (since 1991), Member of the Order of New Zealand (since 1997) (born 1935).
- 20 October – So You Think, Hall of Fame Thoroughbred racehorse, W. S. Cox Plate (2009, 2010), Tattersalls Gold Cup (2011, 2012), Prince of Wales's Stakes (2012) (foaled 2006). (death announced on this date)
- 23 October – Piera McArthur, painter (born 1929).
- 27 October – Robert Neale, literary scholar and university orator (Massey University) (born 1933).
- 29 October – Mick Bremner, rugby union player (Auckland, Canterbury, national team) (born 1930).
- 30 October – Alan Vest, association football player (Perth Azzurri, national team) and manager (Sarawak FA, Perth Glory) (born 1939).
- 31 October
  - Chris Barfoot, realtor (Barfoot & Thompson), conservationist (Tahuna Torea Nature Reserve), and pacifist, secretary of Anglican Pacifist Fellowship New Zealand (1962–1968, 1992–2016) (born 1930).
  - Tim Finn, viticulturist (Neudorf Vineyards) (born 1946).
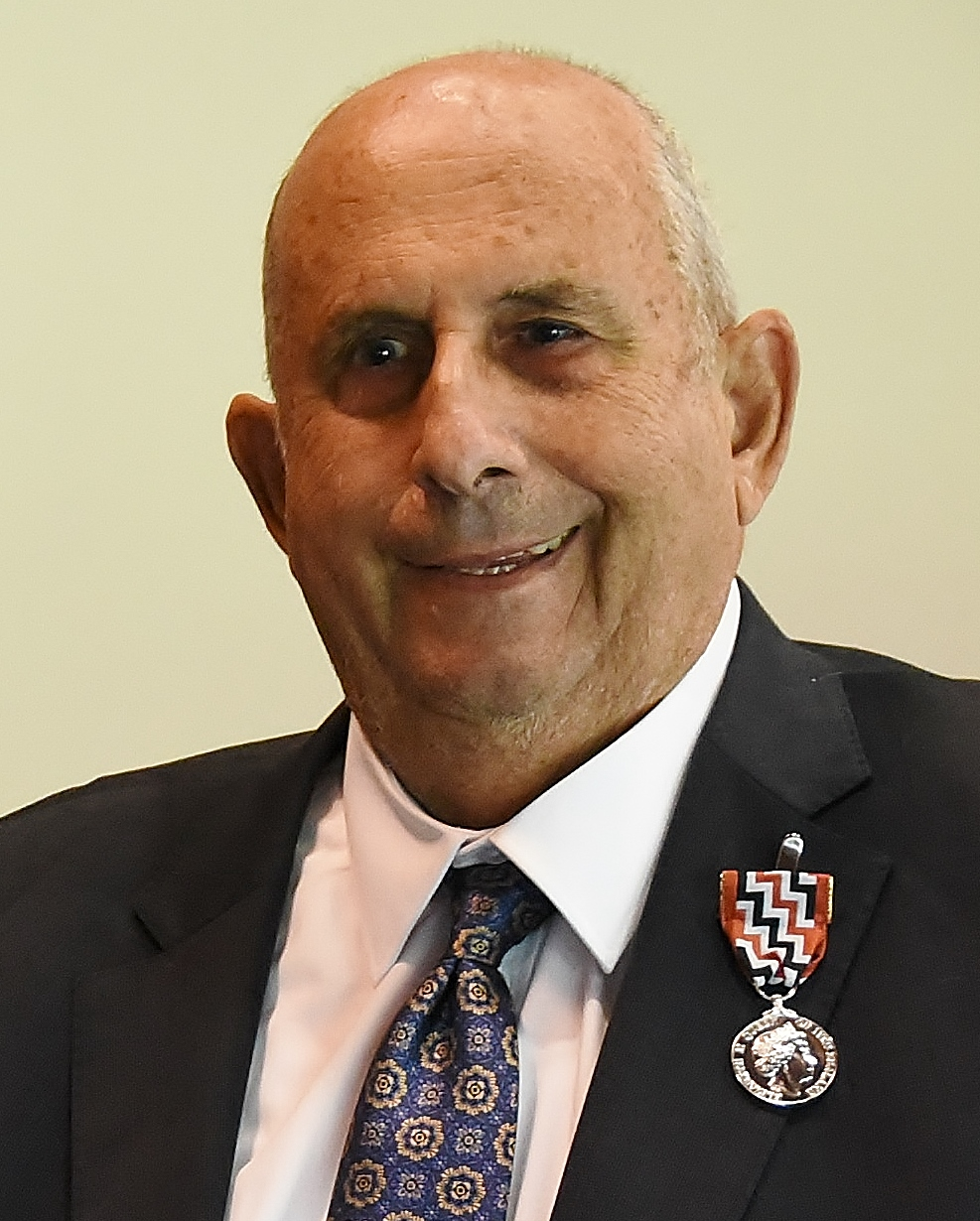
Wally Yovich

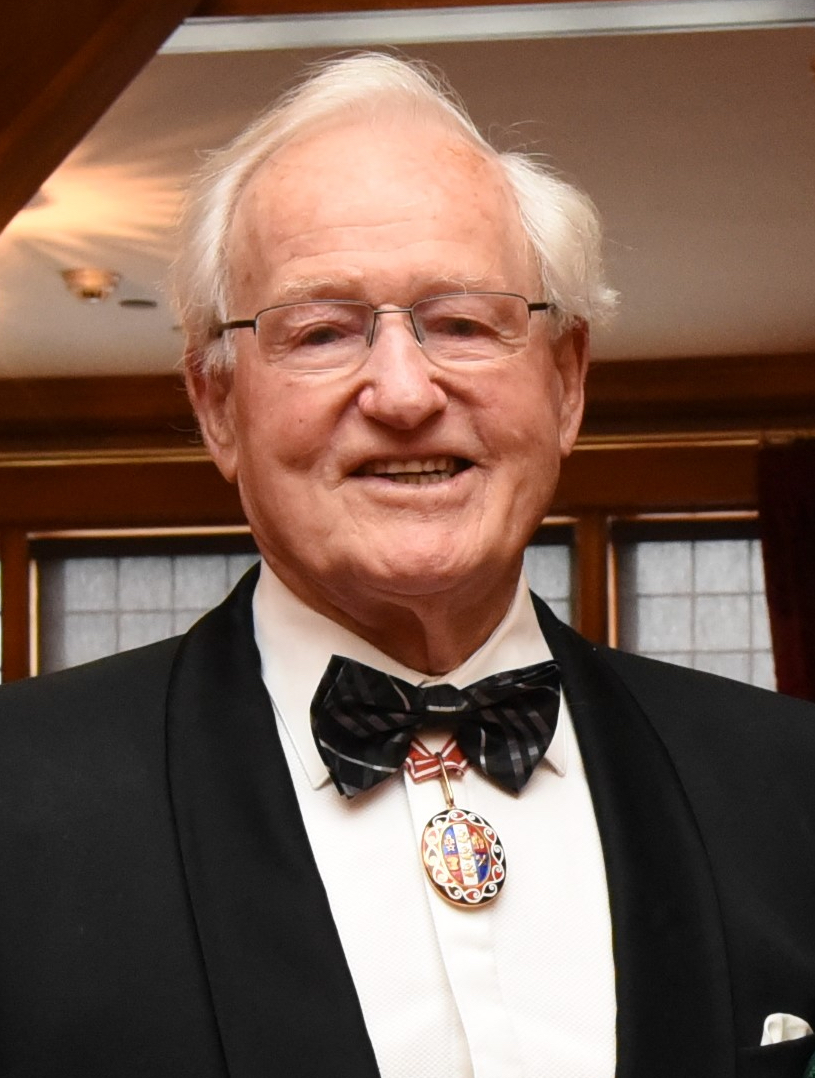
Jim Bolger

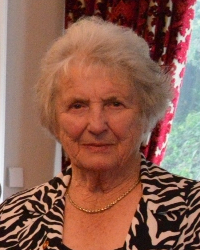
Piera McArthur

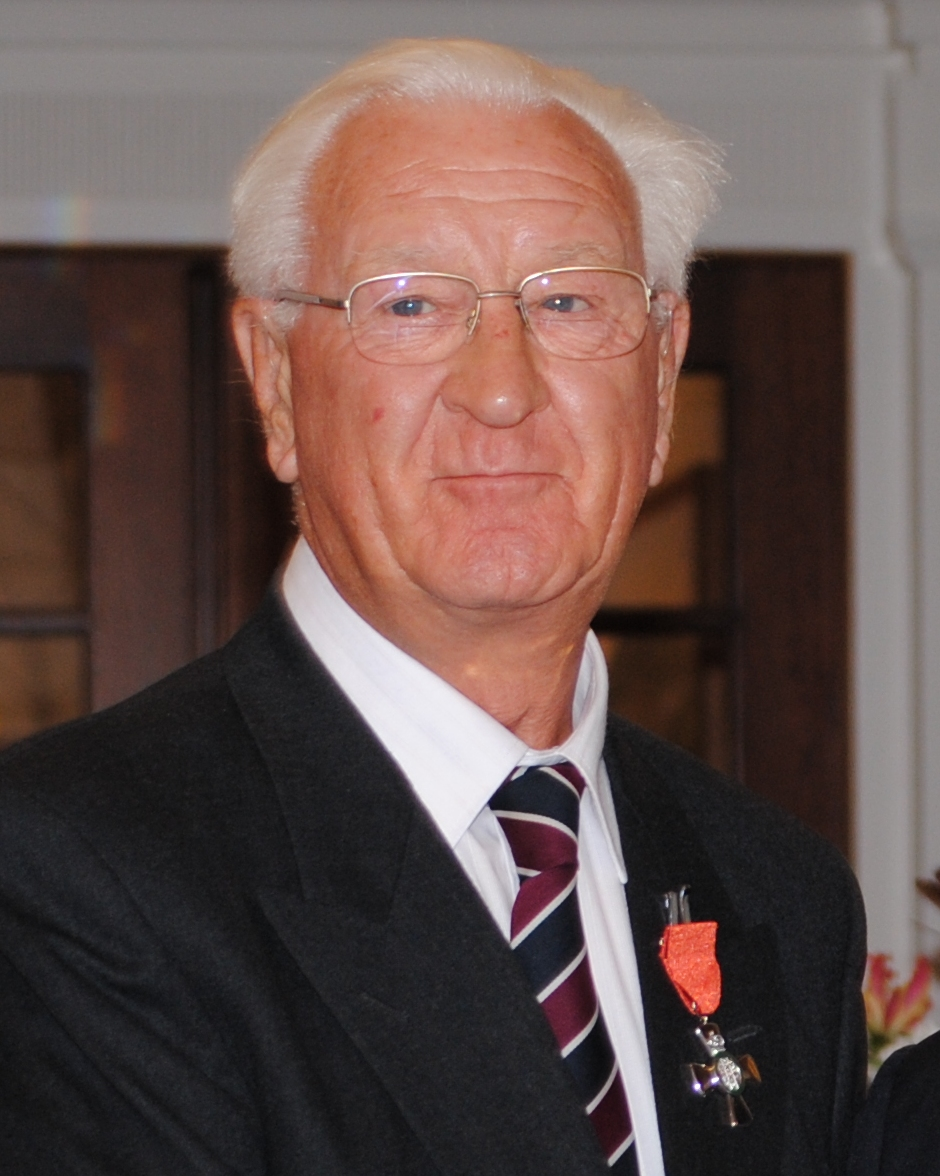
Robert Neale

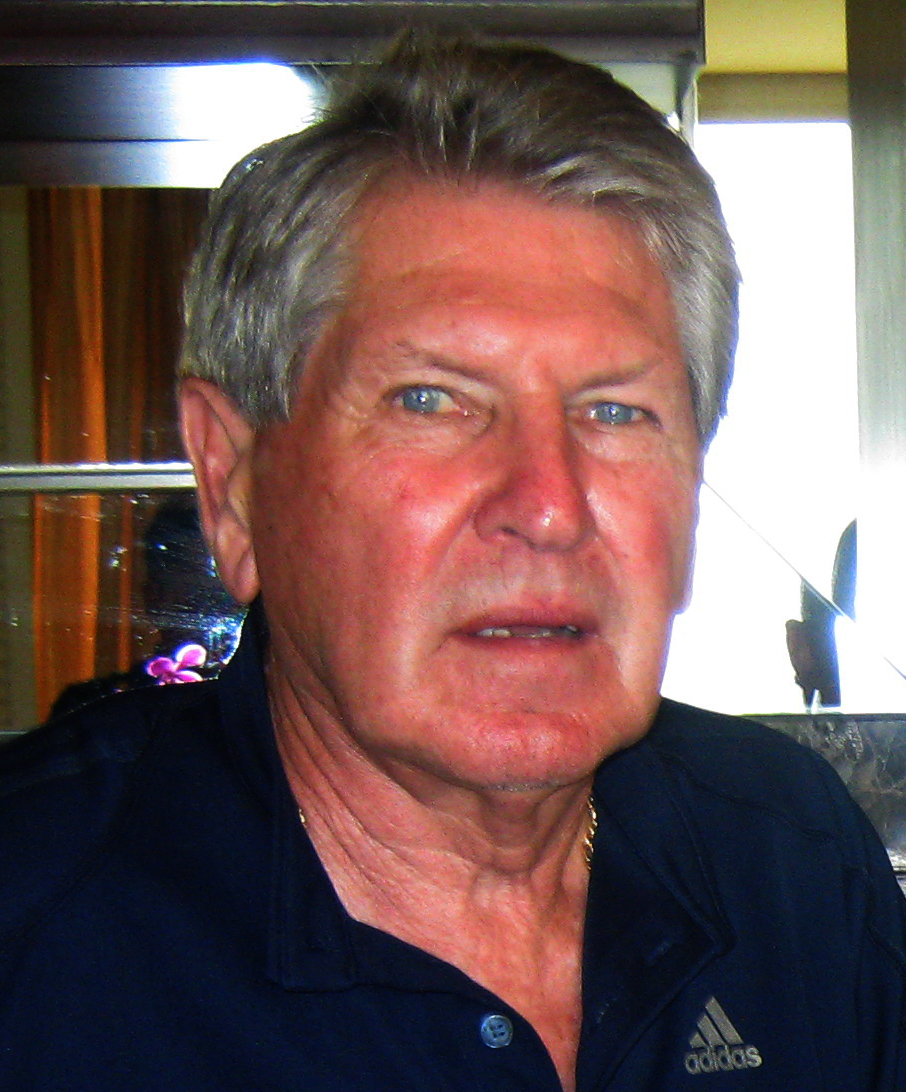
Alan Vest

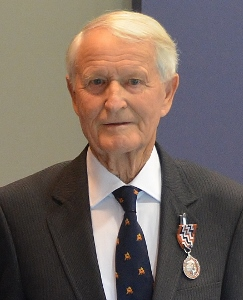
Chris Barfoot

=== November ===
- 1 November – Alan Bickers, civil engineer and local government officer, chief executive of Tauranga City Council (1986–1995), president of IPENZ (1991–1992), chair of Transit New Zealand (2000–2004) (born 1945).
- 2 November – John Walker, plant biochemist (University of Canterbury) (born 1932).
- 4 November – Robert Taylor, Hall of Fame musician (Dragon) and songwriter ("This Time", "Magic") (born c. 1951). (death announced on this date)
- 7 November
  - Patrick Brontë, military historian (born 1970).
  - Bruce Malcolm, rower, lawn bowls player, local politician, trade union official and sports administrator, national men's pairs bowls champion (1990), Port Chalmers Borough Councillor (1968–1977), president of New Zealand Watersiders' Union (1982–1995), president of Otago Rugby Football Union (1988), national men's bowls selector (1998–2008) (born 1935).
  - Roger McClay, politician, MP for Taupo (1981–1984) and Waikaremoana (1984–1996), Minister of Youth Affairs (1990–1996), Commissioner for Children (1998–2003) (born 1945).
  - Lee Tamahori, film director (Once Were Warriors, Die Another Day, Along Came a Spider) (born 1950).
- 8 November – Gary Williams, cricketer (Otago), table tennis player (Bermuda national team), and sports administrator, chair of Table Tennis New Zealand (2015–2018) (born 1953).
- 9 November
  - Stephen Clarke, information manager and public servant, Chief Archivist (2020–2022) (born 1970).
  - Susan Skerman, artist (born 1928).
- 13 November – Sir Donald McIntyre, operatic bass-baritone, Grammy winner (1983), Arts Foundation of New Zealand Icon (since 2004) (born 1934).
- 14 November – June Slee, educationist (Charles Darwin University), writer, and local politician, Canterbury Regional Councillor (2004–2007), Waitaki District Councillor (2013–2016) (born 1945).
- 15 November
  - John Keoghan, agricultural scientist (University of the West Indies, AgResearch) and conservationist (born 1942).
  - Derek Leask, diplomat, High Commissioner to the United Kingdom (2008–2013) (born 1948).
- 16 November
  - Monty Knight, businessman, viticulturist, and local politician, Far North District Councillor (2010–2013), Northland Regional Councillor (2015–2016) (born 1945).
  - Dennis Pezaro, general practitioner, chair of the New Zealand Medical Association (1994–1996) (born 1942).
  - Ian Therkleson, cricketer (Wellington) (born 1938).
- 17 November – John Husband, artist and talkback radio host (Foveaux Radio) (born 1930).
- 21 November
  - Grant Arkell, boxing trainer (Joseph Parker, Patrick Mailata, Mose Auimatagi Jnr) (born c. 1948).
  - Costa Botes, film and documentary maker (Forgotten Silver, Saving Grace, Candyman), Qantas Film and Television Award for best popular documentary (2010) (born 1958).
- 22 November – Manfred Hochstein, geophysicist (University of Auckland, GNS Science), Fellow of the Royal Society of New Zealand (since 1992) (born 1932).
- 23 November – Alistar Jordan, cricketer (Central Districts, Cambridgeshire) (born 1949).
- 27 November – Ian Hampton, cricketer (Central Districts) (born 1942).
- 30 November – Kevin Brown, local politician, Mayor of Grey (1998–2004) (born 1935).
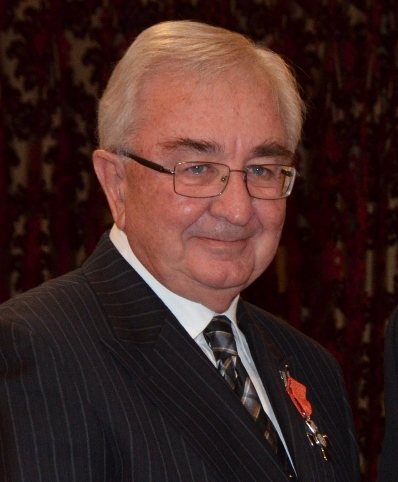
Alan Bickers

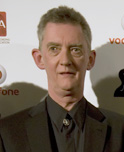
Robert Taylor

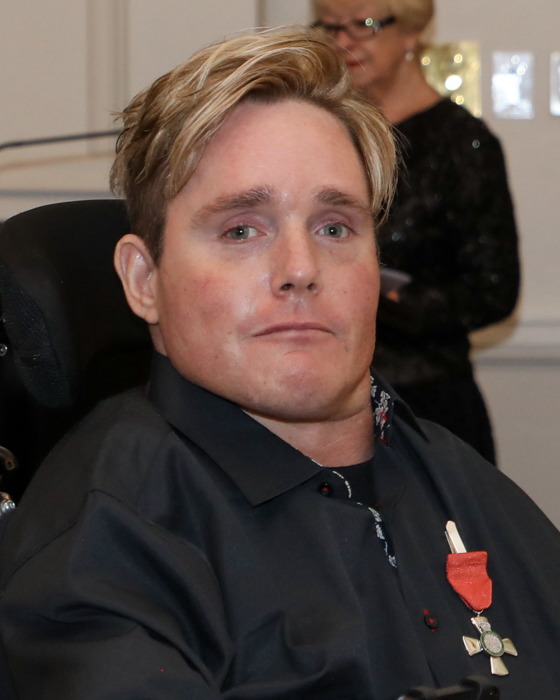
Patrick Brontë

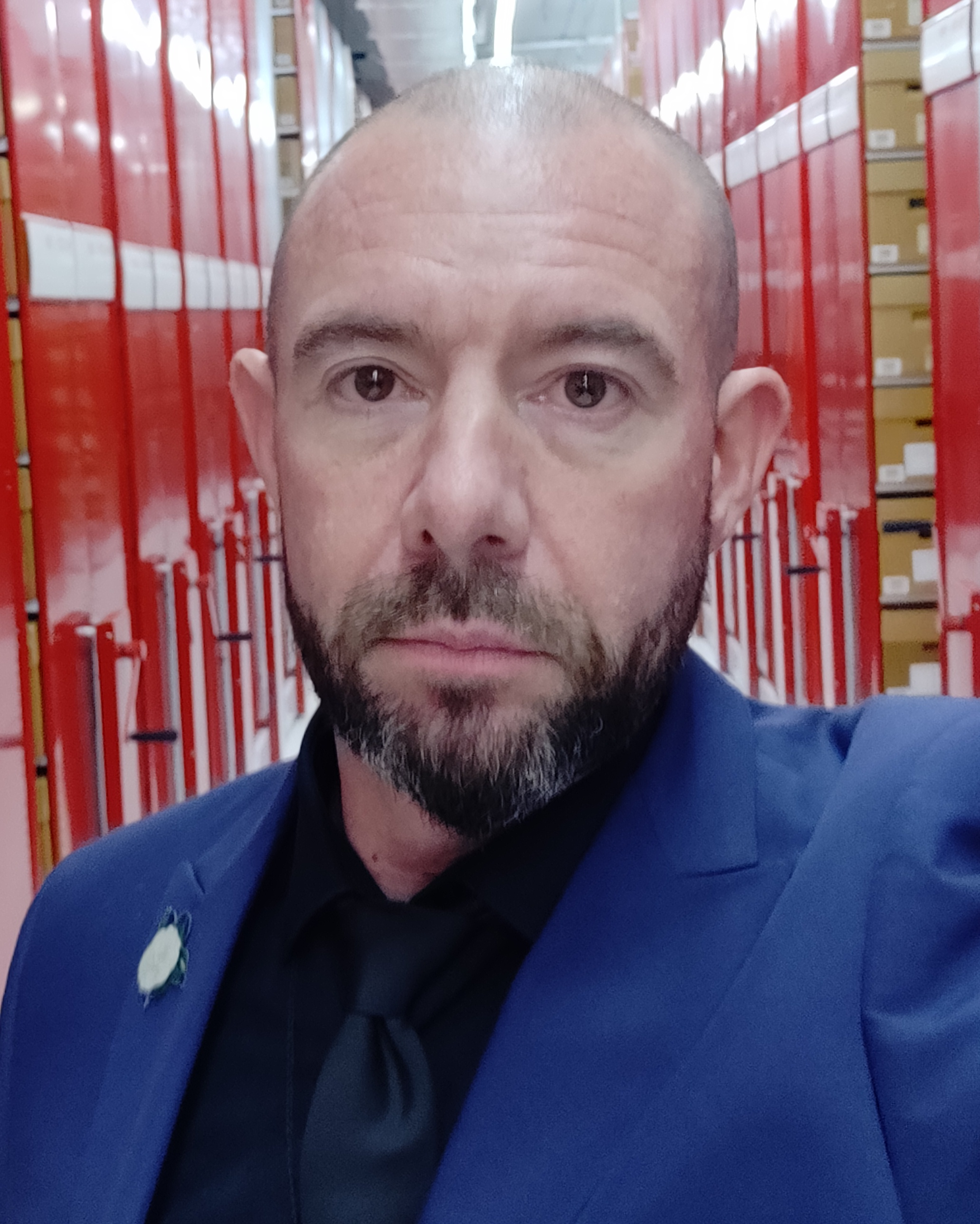
Stephen Clarke

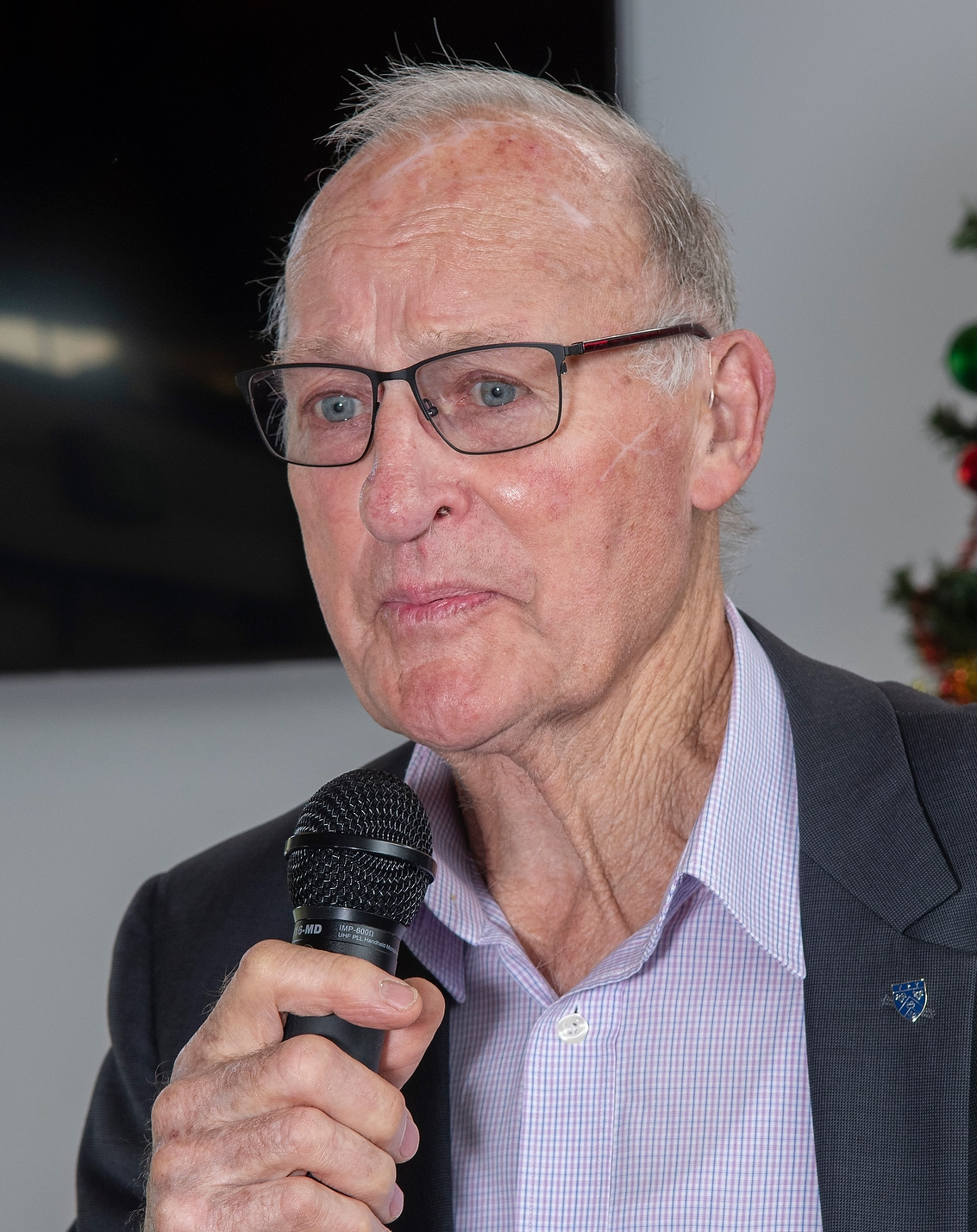
John Keoghan

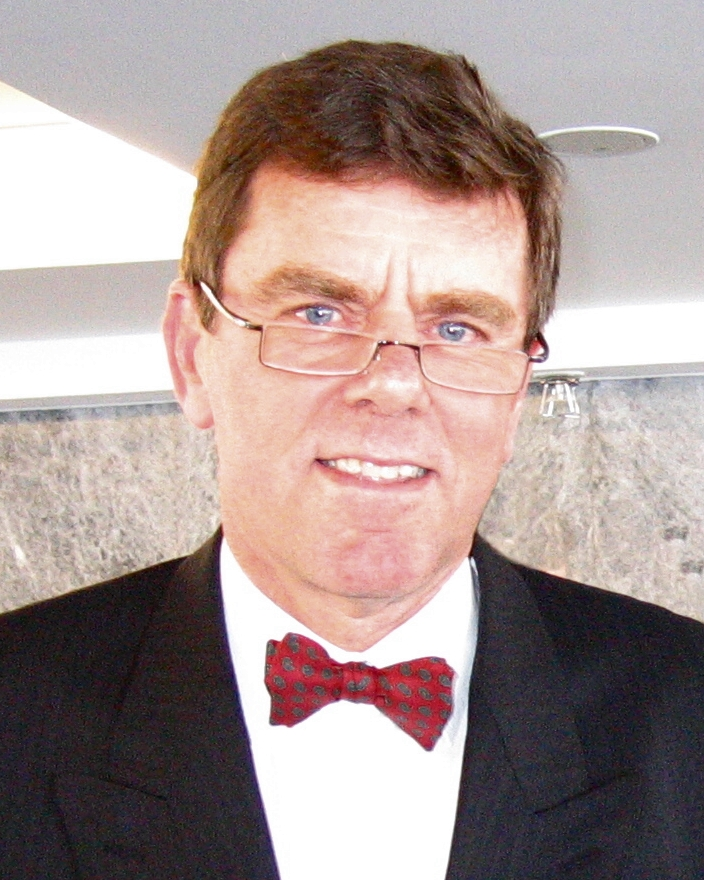
Derek Leask

=== December ===
- 4 December – Michael O'Neill, musician (Screaming Meemees) (born 1963).
- 6 December
  - Ken Hyde, marketing academic (Auckland University of Technology) (born 1959).
  - Bill Sutton, politician and biochemist (DSIR), MP for Hawkes Bay (1984–1990), Hawke's Bay Regional Councillor (1992–1995) (born 1944).
- 8 December – Murray Jones, mountaineer (born 1945).
- 9 December – Ross Morrison, cricketer (Auckland) and tennis administrator (born 1937).
- 10 December
  - Stuart Davis, horticulturist (born 1959).
  - Bob Manthei, educationist (University of Canterbury) and basketball commentator (born 1946).
- 11 December – Brent McLachlan, rock drummer (Bailter Space) and music producer (born 1961).
- 12 December
  - Kelvin Lloyd, ecologist, Loder Cup (2025) (born 1968).
  - Marilyn Yeoman, school principal and community volunteer (Hamilton Gardens), president of the New Zealand Principals' Federation (1995–1997) (born 1942).
- 13 December – Garry Smith, rugby league player (West Coast, Wellington, national team) (born 1941).
- 16 December – Alan Marley, association footballer (Dover, New Brighton, national team) (born 1951).
- 17 December – Peter Arnett, journalist (The Southland Times, Associated Press, CNN), Pulitzer Prize (1966) (born 1934).
- 21 December – John Lee, businessman and tourism pioneer (Cardrona Alpine Resort, Snow Farm, Southern Hemisphere Proving Grounds) (born 1936).
- 23 December – Robert Smellie, lawyer and judge, King's Counsel (since 1979), High Court judge (1985–1998) (born 1930).
- 26 December
  - Sid Ashton, accountant, chief executive of Te Rūnanga o Ngāi Tahu (1993–2002), chair of the Charities Commission (2005–2011) (born 1936).
  - Ken Thompson, police officer, Commissioner of Police (1983–1987) (born 1932).
- 27 December
  - Dave Leathwick, parasitologist (AgResearch) (born 1955).
  - Garrick Tremain, cartoonist (Otago Daily Times) and painter (born 1941).
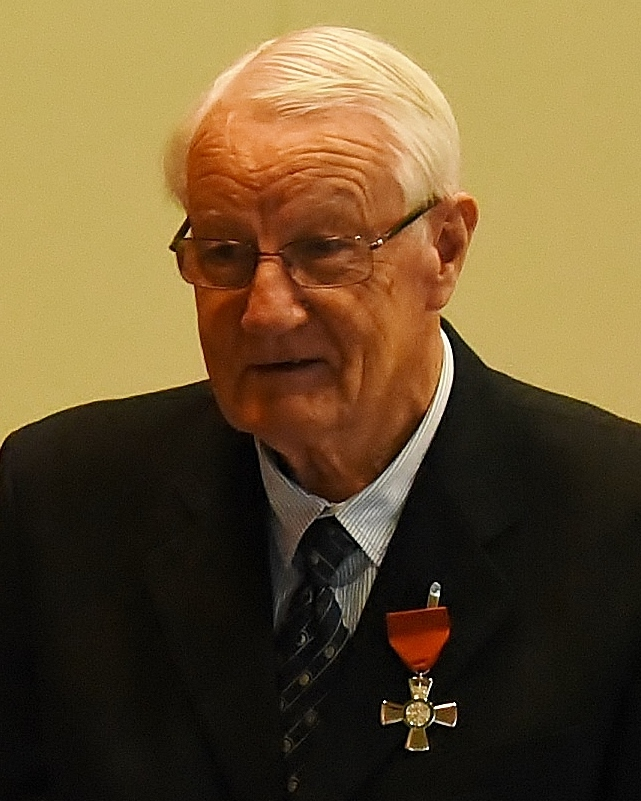
Ross Morrison

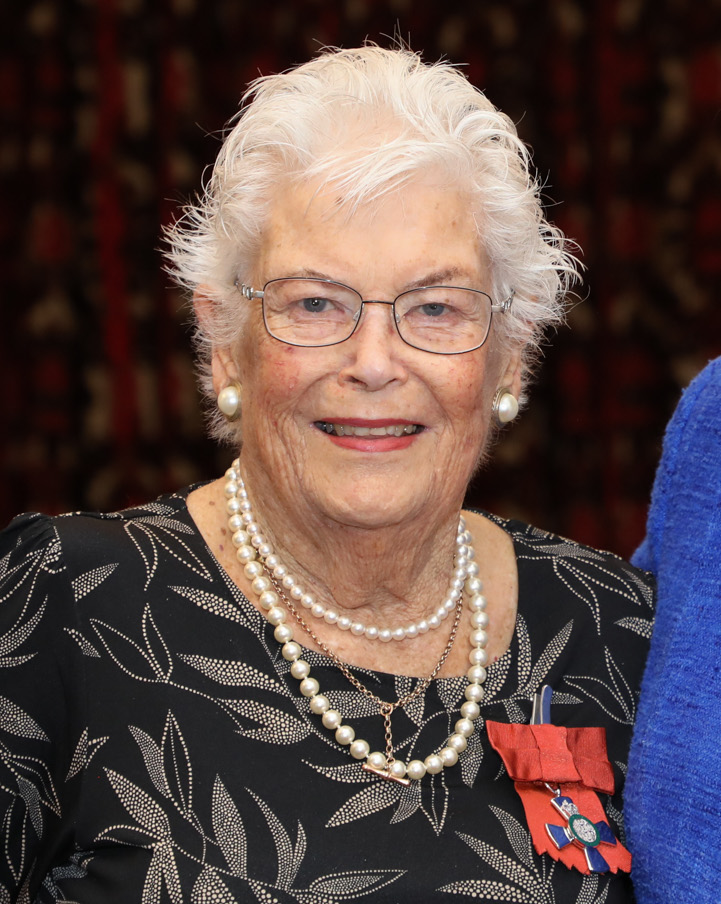
Marilyn Yeoman

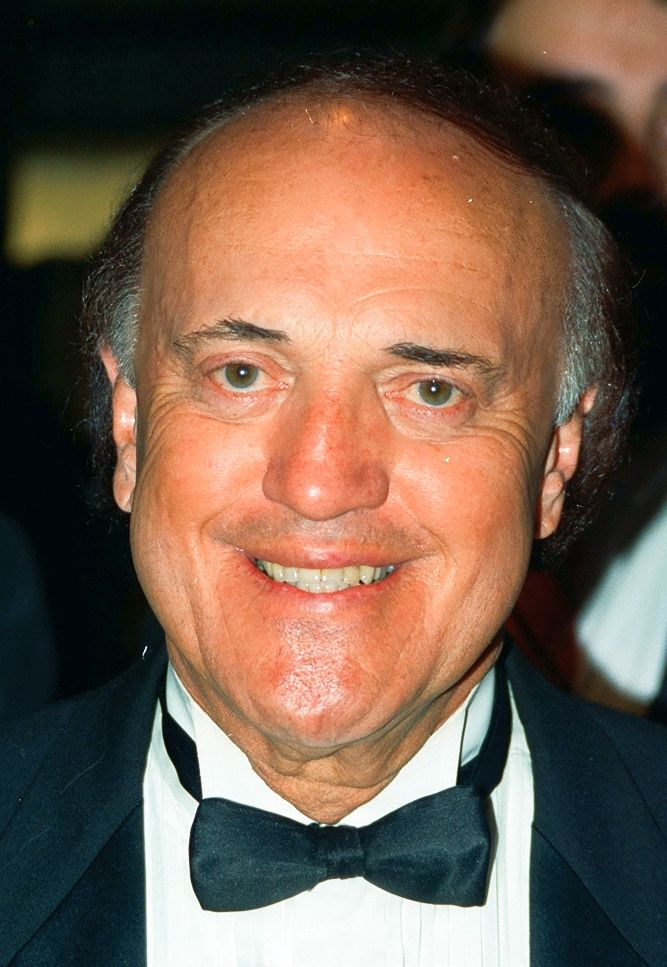
Peter Arnett

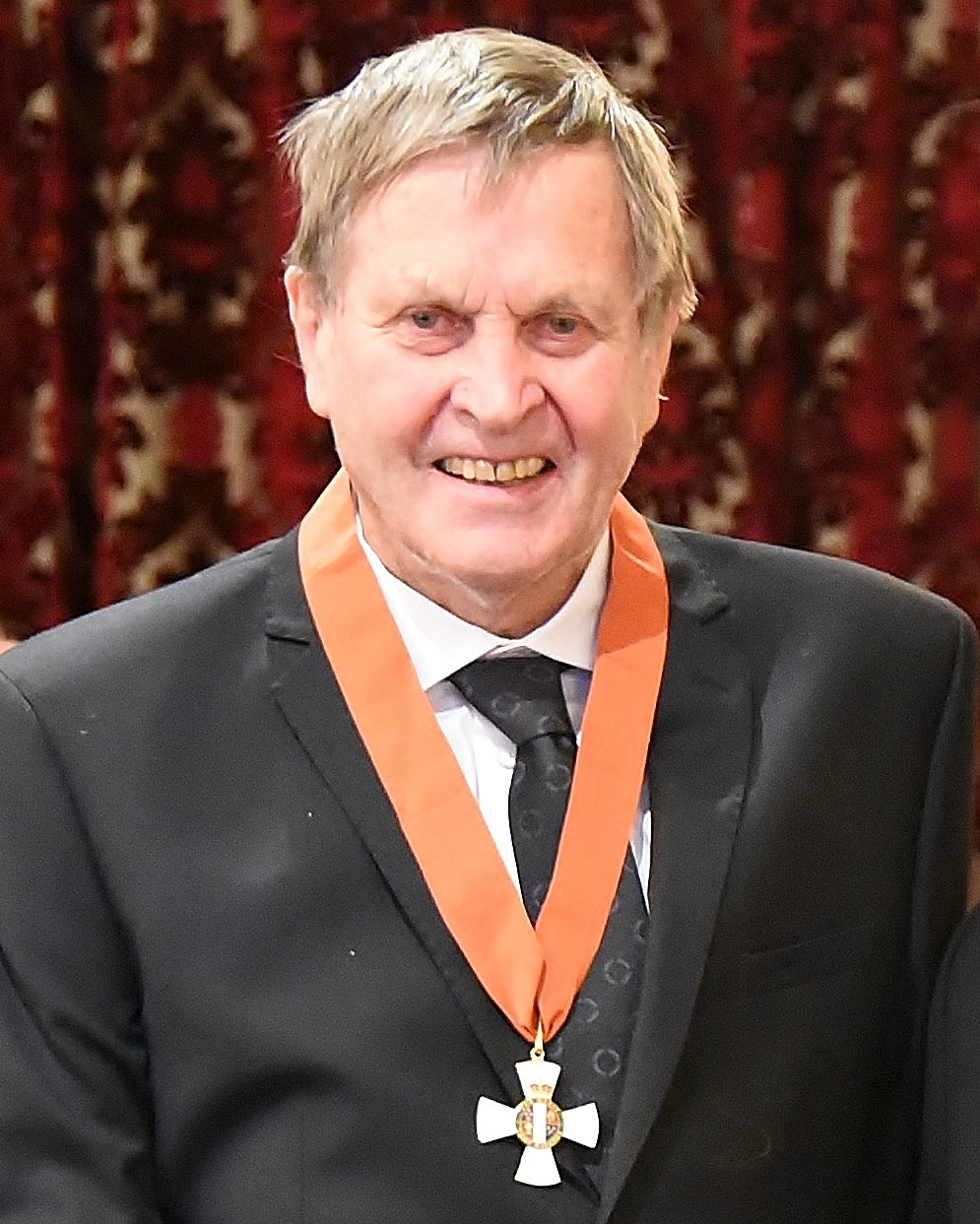
John Lee

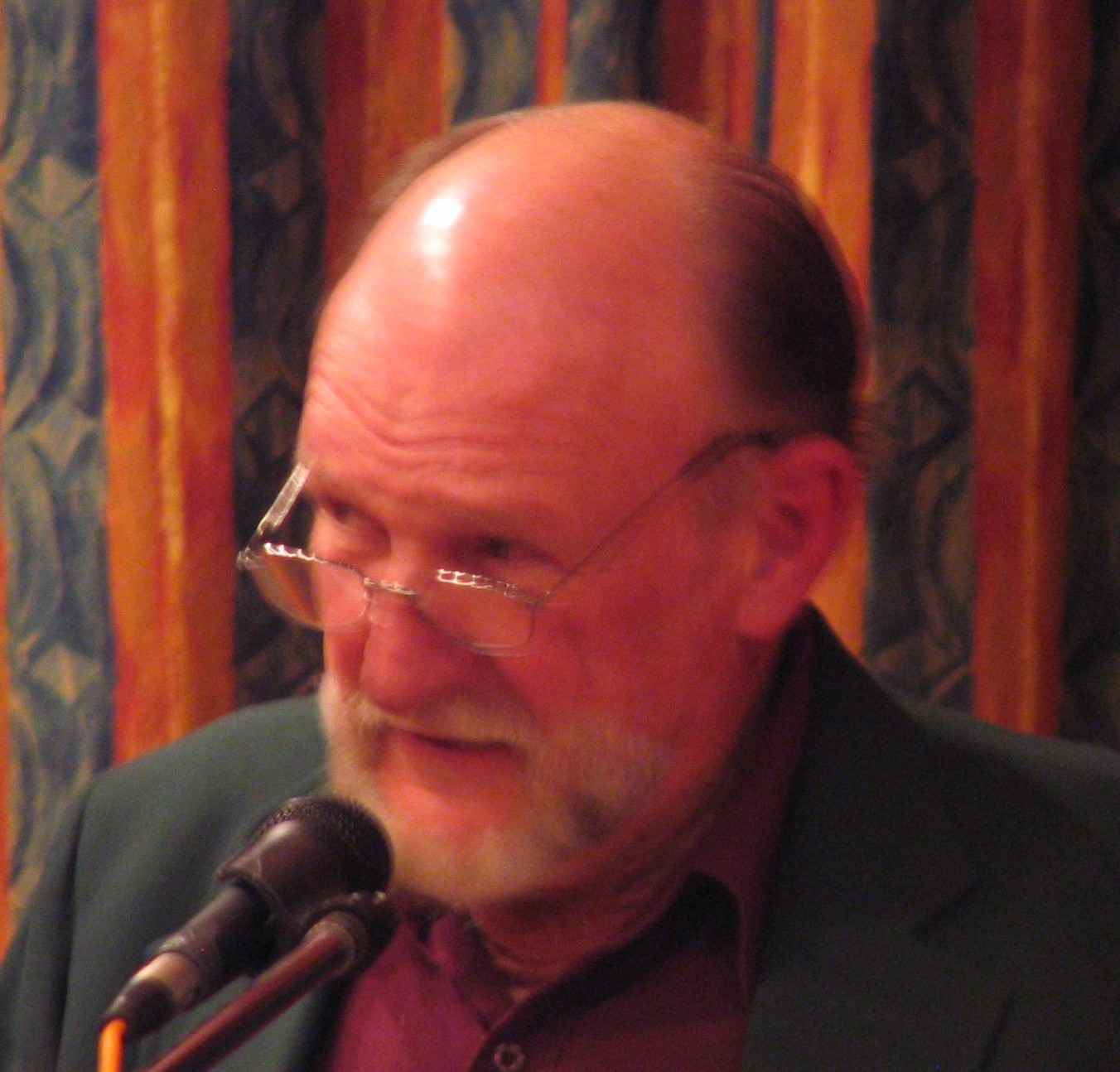
Garrick Tremain
