= Simeon Brown =

New Zealand politician (born 1991)

The Honourable Simeon Brown MP
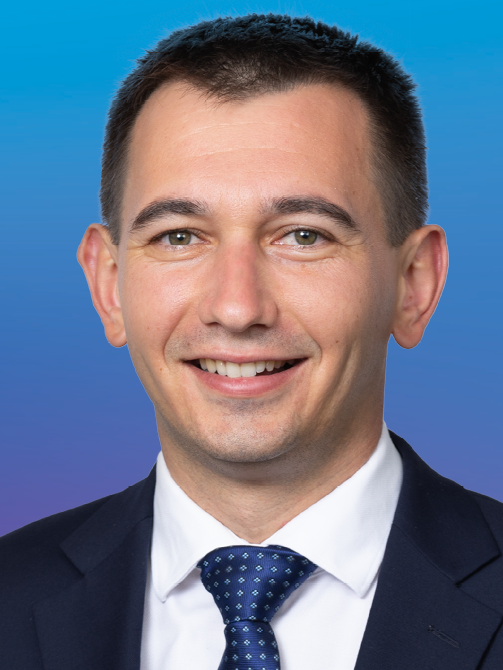
- Brown in 2023

45th Minister of Health
- Incumbent
- Assumed office 24 January 2025
- Prime Minister: Christopher Luxon
- Preceded by: Shane Reti

19th Minister for State Owned Enterprises
- Incumbent
- Assumed office 24 January 2025
- Prime Minister: Christopher Luxon
- Preceded by: Paul Goldsmith

18th Minister for Energy
- Incumbent
- Assumed office 7 April 2026
- Prime Minister: Christopher Luxon
- Preceded by: Simon Watts
- In office 27 November 2023 – 24 January 2025
- Prime Minister: Christopher Luxon
- Preceded by: Megan Woods
- Succeeded by: Simon Watts

4th Minister for Auckland
- In office 27 November 2023 – 7 April 2026
- Prime Minister: Christopher Luxon
- Preceded by: Carmel Sepuloni
- Succeeded by: Simon Watts

29th Minister of Transport
- In office 27 November 2023 – 24 January 2025
- Prime Minister: Christopher Luxon
- Preceded by: David Parker
- Succeeded by: Chris Bishop

22nd Minister of Local Government
- In office 27 November 2023 – 24 January 2025
- Prime Minister: Christopher Luxon
- Preceded by: Kieran McAnulty
- Succeeded by: Simon Watts

Member of the New Zealand Parliament for Pakuranga
- Incumbent
- Assumed office 23 September 2017
- Preceded by: Maurice Williamson
- Majority: 10,050 (2020)

Personal details
- Born: 8 April 1991 (age 35) Rotorua, New Zealand
- Party: National
- Education: University of Auckland
- Website: simeonbrown.co.nz

Simeon Peter Brown (born 8 April 1991) is a New Zealand politician and member of Parliament (MP) for the National Party. He has served in the Sixth National Government since 2023, currently holding the portfolios of minister of health, minister for state owned enterprises, and minister of energy.

Brown served on the Manurewa Local Board from 2013 to 2017, and after graduating from the University of Auckland with conjoint Bachelor of Commerce and Bachelor of Laws degrees in 2016, worked as a senior associate at the Bank of New Zealand. Brown entered Parliament at the 2017 general election, succeeding Maurice Williamson in the safe seat of Pakuranga. During National's time in opposition from 2017 to 2023, he held several shadow portfolios, including transport, public service, and deputy leader of the House.

Following the 2023 general election, Brown entered Cabinet as minister of energy, minister of local government, minister of transport, minister for Auckland, and deputy leader of the House. In a January 2025 cabinet reshuffle, he was appointed minister of health and minister for state owned enterprises, dropping his role as deputy leader of the House along with his energy, local government, and transport portfolios. In April 2026, Brown regained the energy portfolio and became the National Party's campaign chair for the 2026 general election, subsequently retaining his Pakuranga seat.

== Early life and career ==
Brown was born in Rotorua in 1991. His family moved to Clendon Park, Auckland, in 2003, and he attended Manurewa High School. Brown's mother was chair of the local residents' association, the Clendon Residents Group; Brown began attending meetings and became its secretary and, later, treasurer. He then chaired the inaugural Manurewa Youth Council. In 2013, he was appointed to the Manurewa Local Board following the resignation of Daniel Newman. In the 2013 elections, he was elected to a full term on the board, where he also served as deputy chair.

Brown studied at the University of Auckland. He was president of the student anti-abortion group there, ProLife Auckland, and saw through the affiliation of the group with the Auckland University Students' Association. The group was frequently challenged, and was disaffiliated in 2017 after a referendum by the student body. Brown graduated with a conjoint degree of a Bachelor of Commerce and a Bachelor of Laws in 2016, then worked as a senior associate at the Bank of New Zealand.

Brown entered a submission to parliament in which he opposed the Marriage (Definition of Marriage) Amendment Act 2013, which allows same-sex couples to legally marry.

Brown stated, in an interview on his youth, that he was motivated to go into politics to stand up for the values of and fight for "hard work, personal responsibility and enterprise".

In the 2014 general election he contested the parliamentary seat of Manurewa for the National Party, but lost to incumbent Labour MP Louisa Wall by a large margin, and his list placing of 64th on National's list meant he was not elected to Parliament. He was re-elected to the Manurewa Local Board in 2016.

== First term, 2017–2020 ==
New Zealand Parliament
Years	Term	Electorate	List	Party
2017–2020	52nd	Pakuranga	60	National
2020–2023	53rd	Pakuranga	37	National
2023–2026	54th	Pakuranga	9	National
2026–present	55th	Pakuranga	4	National

Brown stood in the electorate of Pakuranga in the 2017 general election. The seat is a National Party safe seat – at the time Brown's predecessor Maurice Williamson had held it since 1987. Brown was selected as the National Party's candidate to replace Williamson after he decided not to seek re-election. Brown was elected with a majority of 14,886 votes.

In February 2018, a private member's bill introduced by Brown was drawn from the ballot. The bill would have ensured that anyone who supplies drugs prohibited by the Psychoactive Substances Act 2013 receives a penalty consistent with the penalty prescribed for supplying a Class C Drug. The bill was strongly supported by family members of synthetic cannabis victim Calum Jones but voted down by Parliament.

Brown voted against the Abortion Legislation Act 2020, which effectively sought to remove abortion from the Crimes Act 1961. Stuff political reporter Henry Cooke described Brown as "one of the most socially conservative MPs in [the National Party]". He voted against the Conversion Practices Prohibition Legislation Act 2022 prohibiting conversion therapy on grounds of sexual orientation, gender identity, or gender expression.

== Second term, 2020–2023 ==
In the 2020 general election, Brown was re-elected in Pakuranga by a large margin of 10,050 votes, making Pakuranga the safest seat for National in terms of the candidate vote.

In the November 2020 caucus reshuffle, led by National's leader Judith Collins, Brown was admitted to the Shadow Cabinet, ranking 20 on the National Party's list, and held four shadow portfolios in Police, Serious Fraud Office, Youth and Corrections.

In early May 2021, Brown received several death threats following his criticism of Green Party co-leader Marama Davidson visiting a hui held by the Waikato Mongrel Mob. He had claimed that her visit was an insult to victims of gang-related crime. In late May, Brown also received several threatening messages from Mongrel Mob members after he criticised a funeral procession in a tweet for allegedly taking over a road in Hawke's Bay. These comments were passed onto the Police. Louise Hutchinson, the Public Liaison for the Waikato Mongrel Mob Kingdom, accused Brown of cultural insensitivity and of using gangs as a "politicking tool." Hutchinson also said that the Waikato Mongrel Mob Kingdom had repeatedly invited Brown and the National Party to meet with them but that these invitations had been declined.

In February 2022, Brown was one of only eight MPs to vote against the Conversion Practices Prohibition Legislation Act 2022.

In June 2022, Brown was caught in a controversy where he liked a Facebook post by fellow MP Simon O'Connor which expressed it was a "good day" following Dobbs v. Jackson Women's Health Organization's overturn of US Supreme Court case Roe v. Wade, which curtailed abortion rights in the US. Brown later apologised for liking O'Connor's post.

On 19 January 2023, Brown was allocated the new Auckland issues portfolio in Party leader Christopher Luxon's shadow cabinet.

On 27 May 2023, Brown stated during a Bay of Plenty meeting about transport infrastructure that introducing bilingual road signs in English and Māori would create confusion and that "they should all be in English." He made these remarks when he was asked his opinion on Waka Kotahi (NZ Transport Agency's) proposal to introduce bilingual road signs. Brown's remarks drew criticism from Prime Minister Chris Hipkins, who suggested that the National Party was dog whistling on Waka Kotahi's bilingual road sign programme. In response to criticism, fellow National MP Chris Bishop stated that National had no problems with bilingualism but opined that the agency should focus on repairing potholes and upgrading roads rather than bilingual road signs. Several Māori National MPs including Tama Potaka, Harete Hipango, and Shane Reti expressed disagreement with Brown, stating that they had no objections to bilingual road signs.

== Third term, 2023–2026 ==
In the 2023 general election, Brown retained Pakuranga by a margin of 18,710 votes, defeating Labour's Nerissa Henry. Following the formation of the National-led coalition government in late November 2023, he was appointed as Minister of Energy, Minister of Local Government, Minister of Transport, Minister for Auckland, and Deputy leader of the House.

On 19 January 2025, Prime Minister Christopher Luxon announced Brown would be appointed as Minister of Health, taking over from Shane Reti. As part of the cabinet reshuffle, Brown relinquished his energy, local government and transport portfolios, which were picked up by Simon Watts and Chris Bishop respectively. In addition, Brown became the Minister for State Owned Enterprises.

Following a cabinet reshuffle in early April 2026, Brown regained his energy portfolio and replaced Bishop as National's campaign chair for the 2026 general election.

=== Energy ===
On 30 April 2024, Brown announced that the Government would invest in 25 new high speed electric vehicle charging facilities along key routes between major urban centres.

=== Transport ===
On 4 December 2023 Brown, in his capacity as Transport Minister, ordered that the transport agency Waka Kotahi give primacy to its English name "New Zealand Transport Agency." On 12 December Brown also confirmed that the Government would be keeping its election promise to abolish "blanket" speed limits on roads and highways. He also announced that he would write to inform Road Controlling Authorities about the changes and new rule. On 21 March, Brown confirmed that Cabinet was developing new rules to replace the so-called "Nanny state" speed limit reductions of the previous Labour Government.

On 16 December Brown, in his capacity as Transport Minister, instructed the New Zealand Transport Agency to halt the Transport Choices Programme which involved funding and working with various local council projects to promote cycling, walking and public transportation. In early November 2023, the Transport Agency had unilaterally halted funding for the Transport Choices Programme amidst coalition talks to form the next National-led government. Notable projects affected by the Government's transportation policy change included the "Let's Get Wellington Moving" programme. On 14 January 2024, Brown confirmed the cancellation of Auckland light rail, stating that the cost of the project was unsustainable for taxpayers.

On 19 March 2024, Brown confirmed that the Government would reduce the proposed road user charge on hybrid vehicles from NZ$53 per 1,000 km to NZ$38. Earlier, the Parliamentary transport select committee had adopted a Labour and Green proposal to reduce the road user charge for hybrid vehicles to NZ$38 against the wishes of committee chair and NZ First MP Andy Foster. Earlier in January 2024, Brown had announced that the Government would implement road user charges on both electric vehicles and plug-in hybrids from 1 April 2024.

On 9 July 2024, Brown announced that the Government would ease Clean Car Standard Rules to comply with Australian fuel efficiency standards. In response clean car lobby group "Drive Electric" said that weakening fuel efficiency standards would lead to high petrol and diesel prices. On 12 July, Brown announced that the Government would be introducing measures to reduce "excessive" road cone usage and to ease temporary traffic management costs.

On 2 September 2024, Brown launched the Government's National Land Transport Programme, which invested NZ$32.9 billion in building 17 "Roads of National Significance" over the next three years. Brown also confirmed that the Government would invest NZ$6.4 billion from this sum into several public infrastructure projects including the City Rail Link, Eastern Busway, Northwest Rapid Transit Corridor, Auckland Airport to Botany Busway, and the Lower North Island Rail Integrated Mobility. On 19 September, Brown announced that the Government would roll out new data collection vans to assess the condition of New Zealand roads and prevent potholes.

On 5 October, Brown announced the Government's NZ$226 million roads resilience package to reduce the impact of severe weather events on roads and highways.

=== Local Government ===
On 14 December 2023 Brown, in his capacity as Local Government Minister, confirmed that the Government would introduce legislation in early 2024 to repeal the outgoing Labour Government's Water Services Reform Programme and introduce its own water reform programme. According to media organisation Newsroom, the Government planned to create a new type of financial separate council-owned organisations to finance water and wastewater infrastructure. Instead of the ten proposed water service entities, local councils would be responsible for complying with water regulation rules and water infrastructural investment.

On 26 January 2024, Brown confirmed that the Government would halt plans to progress legislation introduced by the previous Labour Government to lower the voting age to 16 years for local government elections.

On 14 February Brown, as Local Government Minister, introduced legislation repealing the previous Labour Government's Three Waters reform programme under urgency. Brown also announced that the Government would introduce two new laws in 2024 and 2025 rolling its own "Local Water Done Well" programme, which would emphasise local control over water infrastructure and services.

On 4 April 2024, Brown announced that local and regional councils which introduced Māori wards without polling residents would have to hold referendums during the 2025 local elections or dissolve the wards they had established prior to the 2025 local elections. Brown also announced that the government would introduce legislation restoring the requirement for local councils to hold referendums on Māori wards by the end of July 2024. This bill passed on 30 July 2024.

On 5 May 2024, Brown and Mayor of Auckland Wayne Brown jointly announced that Auckland would avoid a 25.8 percent rates increase as part of the Government's Local Water Done Well plan.

On 8 August 2024, Brown announced that council-controlled organisations would be able to borrow money for water infrastructure from the Local Government Funding Agency. Under the Government's first Local Water Done Well legislation, local councils have a year to develop plans for funding water services they need and ensuring their financial sustainability. This legislation passed into law on 28 August 2024.

=== Health ===
Following his appointment as Minister of Health on 19 January 2025, Brown reiterated that abortion rights and access to abortion services would not change under his watch, stating "every politician has views but what I'm saying is my personal views have been on the public record but we're not changing the legislation." Brown has expressed pro-life views and once liked a social media post by fellow National MP Simon O'Connor welcoming the Supreme Court of the United States's 2022 ruling overturning Roe v Wade. The Abortion Law Reform Association of New Zealand wrote a letter to Prime Minister Luxon expressing concern about Brown's appointment due to his anti-abortion views and activism, saying "Given Mr Brown's persistent opposition to New Zealanders' bodily autonomy in the face of massive public support for abortion – 78% of New Zealanders support the right to an abortion – his appointment leaves us concerned and perplexed about the state of affairs."

On 31 January 2025, Brown confirmed that the new Dunedin Hospital would be built on the site of the former Cadbury factory at a cost of NZ$1.9 billion. He ruled out earlier plans to refurbish the current hospital site. Brown also confirmed that the new hospital would have 351 beds, 20 short-stay surgical beds, 24 theatres, 58 emergency department spaces and 20 imaging units for CT, MRI and X-ray procedures. Brown's announcement was greeted by 35,000 protesters opposed to the cutbacks to the new hospital design.

On 11 February 2025, Brown confirmed that the Government's fluoridation policy would not change despite coalition partner New Zealand First introducing a member's bill to repeal the Health (Fluoridation of Drinking Water) Amendment Act 2021 which empowered the Director General of Health to mandate local councils to fluoridate their drinking water supplies, restoring the right to local communities and councils. The Whangārei District Council and Rotorua Lakes Councillor Conan O'Brien had challenged directives by the Director-General to fluoridate their water supplies, with the latter requesting an inquiry into the safety of water fluoridation. Brown reiterated the Government's position that water fluoridation was a "safe, effective, and affordable measure for improving oral health."

On 6 March 2025, Brown confirmed the Government would lower the bowel screening eligibility age range from 60 to 58 years, using funding from a cancelled programme established by the previous Labour government to lower the eligibility age for Māori and Pasifika New Zealanders from 60 to 50 years. On 7 March, Brown announced a major overhaul of Health New Zealand including reinstating its leadership board, decentralisation and promoting private-public partnership.

On 15 April 2025, Brown disagreed with the Association of Salaried Medical Specialists union's planned strike on 1 May 2025, claiming that senior doctors were "well supported" and saying that the strike would delay healthcare and operations for thousands of New Zealanders. On 16 April, Brown announced New Zealand's first "Health Infrastructure Plan," which seeks to invest NZ$20 billion in upgrading the country's health infrastructure.

In mid-May 2025, Brown announced that the New Zealand Government had allocated NZ$164 million from the 2025 New Zealand budget to expanding urgent and after-hours healthcare services nationwide over the next four years. This includes establishing new urgent and after-hours care services in Dunedin, Counties Manukau, Whangārei, Palmerston North and Tauranga.

In mid June 2025, Brown announced that the Government would be introducing legislation to amend the Pae Ora (Healthy Futures) Act 2022; which provides the statutory framework for New Zealand's healthcare system. The proposed changes including enshrining a new statutory purpose to ensure that patients receive "timely" quality care, legislated health targets to improve accountability and management, reforming governance and financial oversight within Health New Zealand including the selection of board members, reducing red tape and audit requirements, enhancing the advisorial role of the Hauora Māori Advisory Committee, and repurposing the iwi-Māori Partnership Boards to focus on community engagement.

On 21 July 2025, Brown announced that the New Zealand Government would contribute NZ$82.5 million to the establishment of the University of Waikato's medical school. The University and private philanthropists would contribute the remaining NZ$150 million endowment figure.

In early September 2025, Brown proposed that the doctors' union Association of Salaried Medical Specialists engage with Health New Zealand in binding arbitration in an attempt to avert planned strike action. In response, the union's leader Sarah Dalton said that the union has already participated in an unsuccessful facilitated bargaining process with the Employment Relations Authority. Dalton described the Health Minister's intervention as "unusual and unhelpful," and suggested he was unfamiliar with employment law and the collective bargaining process.

On 17 September, Brown addressed the annual New Zealand Nurses Organisation's annual conference in Wellington. During his speech, nurses stood and turned their backs on the Minister to protest understaffing and unsatisfactory pay conditions at hospitals. The conference coincided with an Infometrics report revealing that New Zealand's hospitals were 600 nurses short per shift in 2024.

On 19 November, Brown as Health Minister announced that the Government would be suspending the issuing of new puberty blocker subscriptions for minors with gender dysphoria, effective 19 December. Brown cited the Cass Review in his decision and said that the ban would remain in effect until the completion of a British clinical trial on puberty blockers. The ban was strongly condemned by the Royal Australian and New Zealand College of Psychiatrists (RANZCP), the Professional Association for Transgender Health Aotearoa (PATHA) and multiple other doctors in New Zealand. While the ban was supported by National's New Zealand First and ACT coalition partners, it was opposed by the opposition Labour and Green parties. On 1 December 2025, PATHA filed a court challenge to seek an injunction to stop the incoming ban on new puberty blocker prescriptions. On 17 December, Wellington High Court Justice Michele Wilkinson-Smith ruled in favour of PATHA's bid to delay the new puberty block prescriptions, pending a judicial review.

In mid-December 2025, Brown ordered the four regional divisions of Health New Zealand, which operates the country's hospitals and public health services, to set efficiency targets of between 2-4.9% in order to find NZ$510 million in cost-savings, which would be redirected towards patient care and meeting government health targets.

On 17 January 2026, Brown announced that the Government would invest an extra NZ$25 million to boost hospital capacity and staffing ahead of the winter months.

On 2 April 2026, Brown announced that the Government would raise fuel subsidies for home and community support workers from 63.5 cents to 82.5 cents per km in response to rising fuel costs. He said that the fuel subsidy would last for at least 12 months or until the price of 91 octane petrol fell below $3 per litre for four consecutive weeks.

In late February 2026, Brown announced that AI scribes had been introduced to emergency departments throughout the country.

In mid-June 2026, Brown declined to reappoint Medical Council of New Zealand chairperson Dr Rachelle Love and deputy chairperson Simon Watt to the regulatory body despite the duo being eligible for another term. Brown's spokesperson said that the Medical Council had become "increasingly distracted by politics," and that new members would be appointed to replace them. In response, the Association of Salaried Medical Specialists and the New Zealand Resident Doctors' Association criticised the Health Minister for alleged "political interference" and defended the work of the Medical Council.

== Fourth term, 2026–present ==
During the 2026 New Zealand general election, Brown contested the Pakuranga electorate for National. He was ranked fourth on the National Party list. On 7 November, Brown retained Pakuranga for National by a margin of 13,691 votes based preliminary results.

== Personal life ==
Brown is a Baptist Christian, who attends church regularly. He lives in his electorate in Auckland with his wife Rebecca. Together they have four children.

Brown developed a constructive relationship with then Mayor of Wellington Tory Whanau, despite their differing politics.

New Zealand Parliament
Preceded by Maurice Williamson	Member of Parliament for Pakuranga; 2017–present	Incumbent
