= New Zealand Green Investment Finance =

NZGIF's logo

New Zealand Green Investment Finance (NZGIF) was an investment bank established by the Sixth Labour Government in early 2019 as part of its climate change plans to invest in low-emissions investments. In late 2024, the company attracted criticism for its NZ$145 million loan to failed solar company SolarZero, leading to the resignation of the chair Cecilia Tarrant. In April 2025, the Sixth National Government confirmed that it would disestablish the NZGIF.

== History ==
=== Sixth Labour Government, 2018–2023 ===
On 9 December 2018, the Sixth Labour Government announced plants to create a green investment bank called the New Zealand Green Investment Finance. According to the Government, the bank's four objectives were to make investments that reduce domestic emissions, crowd-in private finance, invest on a commercial basis, and undertake a market leadership role in green investments. The entity would be funded by the Government.

The NZGIF was legally incorporated in April 2019. During the winter of 2019, the bank recruited a leadership team consisting of a chief executive officer, chief investment officer, chief operating officer, and a head of government relations and communications. By late 2019, the NZGIF had entered the investment market with a start-up investment of NZ$100 million.

In early May 2023, Climate Change Minister James Shaw announced that the New Zealand Government would invest NZ$300 million in the New Zealand Green Investment Finance, boosting its total budget to NZ$700 million. By November 2023, the NZGIF's chief investment officer Jason Patrick said that the NZGIF had become the largest direct investor in New Zealand companies and technologies seeking to reduce the country's carbon emissions. Notable investments have included investing NZ$2.5 million in Waikato-based Ruminant BioTech's methanne inhibiting bolus for livestock, a $2.5m equity stake in Total Nutrient Use Efficiency's (TNUE) new biodegradable fertiliser processor plant near Taupō and NZ$15 million in Lodestone Energy's five solar farms, an NZ$25 million loan for Eastland Generation's geothermal power station in Kawerau, NZ$150 million to acquire 150 zero emission buses for bus company Kinetic and NZ$3.5 million in Kayasand's high-technology manufacturing demonstration plant.

=== Sixth National Government, 2023–2025 ===
By late July 2024, the NZGIF had invested NZ$50 million in various decarbonisation investments including fertiliser application, methane emissions, on-farm energy and milk chilling systems. By that time, the bank had acquired a 36.9% stake in TNUE with an NZ$4.5 million equity investment, loaned NZ$10 million for Rural Energy to install 285 solar generators in nearly 200 farms, loaned NZ$25 million for Lightyears Solar to build solar farms, and loaned NZ$10 million for Coolsense to produce low emissions milk chilling units for dairy producer Fonterra.

In late 2024, the NZGIF came under scrutiny for its role in directing the financing of NZ$365 million worth of public and private funding (including NZ$145 million in taxpayer funding) into covering the debts of ill-fated solar energy manufacturing company SolarZero in October 2024. SolarZero's American investment partner BlackRock had closed the company down, citing unsustainable operating losses and constrained liquidity. Due to SolarZero's liquidation, 25 solar panel installation companies were left with hundreds of thousands in unpaid work and the company's redundant staff were owed NZ$1.5 million in unused annual leave. In response to the SolarZero investment, NZGIF's shareholding ministers Nicola Willis and Simon Watts ordered the New Zealand Treasury and the Ministry for the Environment to conduct the annual strategic review of NZGIF's mandate.

On 5 December 2024, Willis and Watts summoned NZGIF chair Cecilia Tarrant for a "please explain meeting." By early December 2024, NZGIF acknowledged that it had been informed of BlackRock's liquidation of SolarZero on 22 November, four days prior to the company's liquidation on 26 November. The bank subsequently admitted that it had been aware since early November 2024 that SolarZero did not have the support of its owner BlackRock. On 12 December, Tarrant resigned as chair of the NZGIF in response to criticism of the bank's role in loaning NZ$145 million into SolarZero.

On 8 April 2025, Watts announced that the Government would disestablish NZGIF, citing limited results and the existence of over 20 government funds with similar objectives to the bank. He confirmed that NZGIF would be developing a disestablishment plan over the next 90 days.

By March 2026, the NZGIF's website had been decommissioned with its content redirected to the New Zealand Treasury's website. The Government also directed the Fund to facilitate a managed wind-down of its investments, with no disestablishment date set. Chair David Woods is expected to remain in his role until 31 March 2027 while directors Peter Castle and Colin McCoy are expected to serve until 30 June 2028. In late March 2026, The Post reported that the outgoing chair Woods was still receiving an annual salary of NZ$1 million. In response, Climate Change Minister Watts said that Wood's salary was "hard to justify."
