= Shadow Cabinet of John Key =

New Zealand shadow cabinet (2006–2008)

New Zealand political leader John Key assembled a "shadow cabinet" within the National Party caucus after his election to the position of Leader of the Opposition in 2006. He composed this of individuals who acted for the party as spokespeople in assigned roles while he was Leader of the Opposition (2006–2008).

As the National Party formed the largest party not in government at the time, the frontbench team was as a result the Official Opposition within the New Zealand House of Representatives.

== Frontbench team ==
The list below contains a list of Key's spokespeople and their respective roles as announced December 2006. The first thirty members are given rankings with an extended group of junior members who are unranked.

Rank	Spokesperson	Portfolio
1	John Key	Leader of the Opposition; Spokesperson for SIS
2	Hon Bill English	Deputy Leader of the Opposition; Spokesperson for Finance
3	Gerry Brownlee	Shadow Leader of the House; Spokesperson for Energy; Spokesperson for State Owned Services; Spokesperson for State Services; Chair of Policy Committee
4	Simon Power	Spokesperson for Justice; Spokesperson for Corrections; Spokesperson for Commerce
5	Hon Dr Nick Smith	Spokesperson for the Environment/RMA; Spokesperson for Conservation; Spokesperson for Climate Change; Spokesperson for Building and Construction; Caucus Representative on the National Party board
6	Hon Tony Ryall	Spokesperson for Health
7	Judith Collins	Spokesperson for Welfare; Spokesperson for Veteran's Affairs; Spokesperson for Family Affairs
8	Katherine Rich	Spokesperson for Education
9	Hon Maurice Williamson	Spokesperson for Transport; Spokesperson for Communications and Information Technology
10	David Carter	Spokesperson for Agriculture
11	Murray McCully	Spokesperson for Foreign Affairs; Spokesperson for Sport and Recreation; Associate Spokesperson for Defense
12	Hon Dr Lockwood Smith	Spokesperson for Immigration; Spokesperson for Revenue; Associate Spokesperson for Finance
13	Dr Wayne Mapp	Spokesperson for Defense; Spokesperson for Auckland Issues; Associate Spokesperson for Labor and Industrial Relations; Chair of Caucus Policy Committee
14	Chris Finlayson	Shadow Attorney-General; Spokesperson for Treaty Negotiations; Spokesperson for Arts, Culture and Heritage
15	Tim Groser	Spokesperson for Trade; Associate Spokesperson for Finance
16	Anne Tolley	Chief Whip; Associate Spokesperson for Welfare (CYFS)
17	Lindsay Tisch	Spokesperson for Tourism; Spokesperson for Small Business; Spokesperson for Racing
18	Pansy Wong	Spokesperson for ACC; Spokesperson for Ethnic Affairs; Associate Spokesperson for Education (International Education); Associate Spokesperson for Immigration
19	John Carter	Spokesperson for Local Government; Spokesperson for Civil Defense
20	Phil Heatley	Spokesperson for Housing; Spokesperson for Fisheries; Associate Spokesperson for Energy
21	Georgina te Heuheu	Spokesperson for Maori Affairs (Culture & Development); Associate Spokesperson for Defense
22	Paul Hutchison	Spokesperson for Tertiary Education; Associate Spokesperson for ACC; Spokesperson for Research, Science and Technology/CRIs; Spokesperson for Policy on Children; Spokesperson for Disability Issues
23	Shane Ardern	Spokesperson for Biosecurity; Spokesperson for Fisheries; Spokesperson for Customs
24	Dr Richard Worth	Spokesperson for Economic Development; Associate Spokesperson for Justice; Associate Spokesperson for Ethnic Affairs
25	Tau Henare	Spokesperson for Maori Affairs (Education & TPK)
26	Jonathan Coleman	Spokesperson for Broadcasting; Associate Spokesperson for Health
27	Clem Simich	Deputy Speaker; Associate Spokesperson for Foreign Affairs
28	Kate Wilkinson	Spokesperson for Labor and Industrial Relations; Spokesperson for Consumer Affairs; Associate Spokesperson for Justice
29	Eric Roy	Spokesperson for Outdoor Recreation; Associate Spokesperson for Conservation
30	Sandra Goudie	Spokesperson for Senior Citizens; Spokesperson for Internal Affairs; Associate Spokesperson for Local Government
	Chris Auchinvole	Associate Spokesperson for Energy (Mining); Associate Spokesperson for Tourism
	David Bennett	Associate Spokesperson for Transport
	Paula Bennett	Associate Spokesperson for Education (Early Childhood)
	Jackie Blue	Spokesperson for Women's Affairs; Associate Spokesperson for Health
	Mark Blumsky	Associate Spokesperson for Local Government; Associate Spokesperson for Economic Development
	Chester Borrows	Spokesperson for Police; Associate Spokesperson for Welfare
	Bob Clarkson	Associate Spokesperson for Building and Construction; Associate Spokesperson for Housing
	Jacqui Dean	Associate Spokesperson for the Environment/RMA
	Craig Foss	Associate Spokesperson for Finance; Associate Spokesperson for Agriculture (Horticulture)
	Jo Goodhew	Associate Spokesperson for Health
	Nathan Guy	Junior Whip; Associate Spokesperson for Agriculture
	John Hayes	Associate Spokesperson for Foreign Affairs & Trade (Pacific Island and ODA)
	Colin King	Associate Spokesperson for Education (Trade Training)
	Allan Peachey	Associate Spokesperson for Education
	Katrina Shanks	Associate Spokesperson for Commerce; Associate Spokesperson for Economic Development
	Chris Tremain	Associate Spokesperson for Economic Development; Associate Spokesperson for Small Business
	Nicky Wagner	Spokesperson for Youth; Associate Spokesperson for the Environment/RMA; Associate Spokesperson for Arts, Culture and Heritage
