= Shadow Cabinet of Don Brash =

New Zealand shadow cabinet (2003–2006)

New Zealand political leader Don Brash assembled a "shadow cabinet" within the National Party caucus after his election to the position of Leader of the Opposition in 2003. He composed this of individuals who acted for the party as spokespeople in assigned roles while he was Leader of the Opposition (2003–2006).

As the National Party formed the largest party not in government at the time, the frontbench team was as a result the Official Opposition within the New Zealand House of Representatives.

== Frontbench team ==
The list below contains a list of Brash's spokespeople and their respective roles as announced 26 October 2005. The first twenty-seven members are given rankings.

Rank	Spokesperson	Portfolio
1	Dr Don Brash	Leader of the Opposition; Spokesperson for SIS; Spokesperson for Relationships with non-government parties
2	Gerry Brownlee	Deputy Leader of the Opposition; Shadow Leader of the House; Spokesperson for State Services; Spokesperson for Treaty of Waitangi Issues; Spokesperson for Maori Affairs
3	Hon Bill English	Spokesperson for Education; Deputy Spokesperson for Finance
4	John Key	Spokesperson for Finance
5	Hon Dr Nick Smith	Spokesperson for the Environment/RMA; Spokesperson for Energy; Spokesperson for Building and Construction; Caucus Representative on the National Party board
6	Hon Tony Ryall	Spokesperson for Health
7	Simon Power	Spokesperson for Law and Order (Police and Corrections)
8	Judith Collins	Spokesperson for Welfare; Spokesperson for Veteran's Affairs; Spokesperson for Family Affairs; Liaison with Pacific Island New Zealanders
9	Katherine Rich	Spokesperson for Economic Development; Spokesperson for SOE's; Liaison with Youth
10	Hon David Carter	Spokesperson for Agriculture; Spokesperson for Tourism
11	Hon Murray McCully	Spokesperson for Foreign Affairs and Trade; Spokesperson for Defense; Spokesperson for Conservation; Spokesperson for Sport and Recreation
12	Hon Dr Lockwood Smith	Spokesperson for Immigration; Spokesperson for Revenue; Associate Spokesperson for Finance; Liaison with ex-pats
13	Hon Maurice Williamson	Spokesperson for Transport; Spokesperson for Communications and Information; Spokesperson for Technology
14	Dr Wayne Mapp	Spokesperson for Labor and Industrial Relations; Spokesperson for Political Correctness eradication Chair of Caucus Policy Committee
15	Dr Richard Worth	Spokesperson for Justice; Spokesperson for Local Government (Auckland)
16	Lindsay Tisch	Chief Whip; Spokesperson for Racing
17	Tim Groser	Spokesperson for Arts, Culture and Heritage; Associate Spokesperson for Foreign Affairs and Trade
18	Chris Finlayson	Shadow Attorney-General; Associate Spokesperson for Treaty of Waitangi Issues and Maori Affairs (Treaty Negotiations); Associate Spokesperson for Arts, Culture and Heritage
19	John Carter	Spokesperson for Local Government; Spokesperson for Civil Defense
20	Pansy Wong	Associate Spokesperson for Education (International Education); Associate Spokesperson for Immigration; Associate Spokesperson for Revenue; Liaison with Asian New Zealanders
21	Hon Georgina te Heuheu	Spokesperson for Broadcasting; Associate Spokesperson for Defense; Associate Spokesperson for Treaty of Waitangi Issues and Maori Affairs (Maori development)
22	Paul Hutchison	Spokesperson for ACC; Spokesperson for Disability Issues; Spokesperson for Research, Science and Technology/CRIs; Spokesperson for policy on children
23	Shane Ardern	Spokesperson for Fisheries; Spokesperson for Customs; Spokesperson for Biosecurity; Liaison with rural communities
24	Phil Heatley	Spokesperson for Housing; Associate Spokesperson for Energy; Associate Spokesperson for Fisheries
25	Hon Tau Henare	Associate Spokesperson for Treaty of Waitangi Issues and Maori Affairs (Treaty negotiations); Associate Spokesperson for Education (Early Childhood)
26	Sandra Goudie	Spokesperson for Senior Citizens; Spokesperson for Internal Affairs; Associate Spokesperson for Local Government
27	Brian Connell	Spokesperson for Forestry; Spokesperson for Commerce; Spokesperson for Consumer Affairs; Spokesperson for Statistics
