= Simon Watts =

New Zealand politician

The Honourable Simon Watts MP
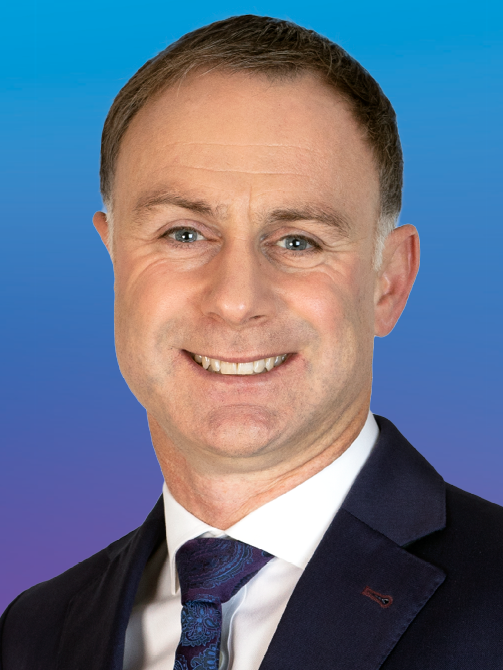
- Watts in 2023

33rd Minister of Revenue
- Incumbent
- Assumed office 27 November 2023
- Prime Minister: Christopher Luxon
- Preceded by: Barbara Edmonds

7th Minister of Climate Change
- Incumbent
- Assumed office 27 November 2023
- Prime Minister: Christopher Luxon
- Preceded by: James Shaw

19th Minister for Energy
- In office 24 January 2025 – 7 April 2026
- Prime Minister: Christopher Luxon
- Preceded by: Simeon Brown
- Succeeded by: Simeon Brown

23rd Minister of Local Government
- Incumbent
- Assumed office 24 January 2025
- Prime Minister: Christopher Luxon
- Preceded by: Simeon Brown

5th Minister for Auckland
- Incumbent
- Assumed office 7 April 2026
- Prime Minister: Christopher Luxon
- Preceded by: Simeon Brown

Member of the New Zealand Parliament for North Shore
- Incumbent
- Assumed office 17 October 2020
- Preceded by: Maggie Barry

Personal details
- Born: 1978 or 1979 (age 47–48)
- Party: National
- Children: 2
- Profession: Accountant
- Website: simonwatts.national.org.nz

Simon Glen Watts (born 1978/1979) is a New Zealand politician. He has been the Member of the New Zealand House of Representatives for North Shore, representing the National Party, since the 2020 New Zealand general election.

He currently serves as Minister of Climate Change and Minister of Revenue and Minister of Building and Construction in the Sixth National Government of New Zealand.

== Early life and career ==
Watts was born in Cambridge, Waikato, where his family were orchardists. He has two younger brothers. He was diagnosed with type 1 diabetes as a toddler.

Watts attended the University of Waikato, graduating with a Bachelor of Management Studies in accounting and finance. He has worked in both the private and public sector roles in New Zealand, Asia and the United Kingdom, including a summer internship at the New Zealand Inland Revenue Department. During the 2008 financial crisis, he was working for the Royal Bank of Scotland in London in various management roles. He is a chartered accountant and was later deputy chief financial officer at the Waitematā District Health Board. He also has a Bachelor of Health Science in paramedicine from the Auckland University of Technology, and at one point worked as a front-line ambulance officer for St John.

== Political career ==
New Zealand Parliament
Years	Term	Electorate	List	Party
2020–2023	53rd	North Shore	65	National
2023–2026	54th	North Shore	17	National
2026–present	55th	North Shore	13	National

=== Early political career ===
In 2018 Watts attempted to gain the National nomination in the Northcote by-election to replace former Cabinet Minister Jonathan Coleman, but lost to Dan Bidois.

Watts was selected as the National candidate for the North Shore electorate in March 2020, ahead of four other nominees including former Devonport-Takapuna Local Board member Joe Bergin and Kaipātiki Local Board member Danielle Grant. Watts stated his objectives in politics are giving more government support to the health sector and building more roads and new infrastructure. He is also concerned about improving wastewater networks to improve water quality at beaches.

=== First term, 2020–2023 ===
During the 2020 New Zealand general election, he was elected to the North Shore seat by a margin of 3,734 votes, defeating Labour's candidate Romy Udanga. In his first term in Parliament, he sat on the health committee until December 2021 and thereafter sat on the finance and expenditure committee. In the shadow cabinet of Christopher Luxon, Watts was the party spokesperson for local government, regional development, ACC, climate change, and statistics. In the local government portfolio, he was an outspoken critic of the Labour government's Water Services Reform Programme. His member's bill, the Accident Compensation (Notice of Decisions) Amendment Bill, proposed broadening the rights of employers to appeal decisions of the Accident Compensation Corporation but was defeated at its first reading on 7 April 2021.

=== Second term, 2023–2026 ===
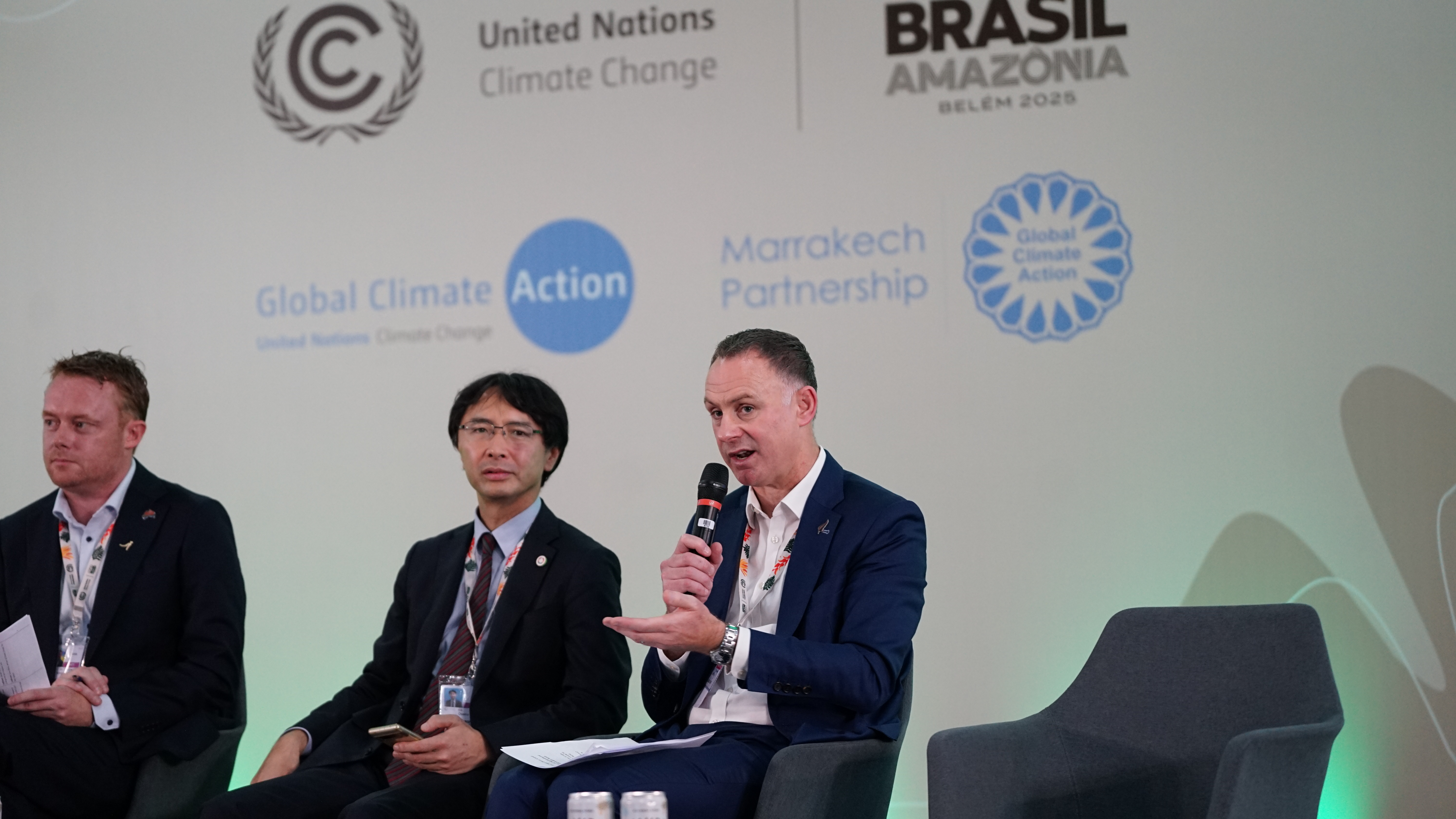
Watts at COP30, Belém, 2025

During the 2023 New Zealand general election, Watts retained North Shore by a margin of 16,330 votes, defeating Labour's candidate George Hampton. Following the election, Watts was appointed as Minister of Climate Change and Minister of Revenue in the National-led coalition government.

On 24 April 2024, Watts assumed former Minister of Media and Communications Melissa Lee's Cabinet place during a cabinet reshuffle. During a cabinet reshuffle that occurred on 19 January 2025, Watts assumed the energy and local government portfolios from Simeon Brown. Following a cabinet reshuffle in early April 2026, Watts became the Minister for Auckland.

==== Climate Change ====
As Climate Change Minister, he attended the 2023 United Nations Climate Change Conference (COP28) shortly after he was sworn in, alongside his predecessor James Shaw. Watts stated that the government would "advocate for the global phase-out of fossil fuels" despite reopening the country to oil and gas exploration.

On 10 July 2024, Watts released the Government's climate change strategy. He announced that the Government's climate change strategy would be guided by five pillars: ensuring resilient infrastructure and well-prepared communities, credible markets to support climate transition, abundant and affordable clean energy, climate innovation boosting the economy and nature-based climate change solutions. Watts also announced that the Government would begin consultation for its 2024-2030 emissions reduction plan over the next two weeks. In early October 2024, Watts appointed senior diplomat Stuart Horne as New Zealand's Climate Change Ambassador.

On 8 April 2025 Watts confirmed that the New Zealand Government would shut down its green investment bank New Zealand Green Investment Finance, citing poor performance.

On 25 June 2025, Watts confirmed that New Zealand had withdrawn its associate membership of the Beyond Oil & Gas Alliance (Boga), an alliance of countries and stakeholders formed at a 2021 United Nations climate summit to promote a transition away from fossil fuels at international summits. He justified the decision on the grounds that only a small number of countries were involved in Boga, stating "in the context of significance or implications, it doesn't have anything material for this Government." Watts also said that remaining in Boga conflicted with the Government's policy of reversing the previous Labour Government's ban on future oil and gas exploration. Greens co-leader Chlöe Swarbrick criticised the decision, saying that it would undermine New Zealand's international reputation and relationships.

A case against Watts, in his role as Minister for Climate Change, was brought to the High Court in March 2026 by Lawyers for Climate Action NZ and the Environmental Law Initiative. The case argued that the government's plan to tackle climate change is inherently risky, and that dismantling dozens of climate policies without consulting the public was unlawful.

==== Miscellaneous ====
On 21 March 2026 Watts, as Minister of Local Government, confirmed that the Government would launch a complete review of the Dog Control Act 1996 in response to a spate of violent dog attacks. These incidents included a Northland woman who was mauled to death by a pack of dogs.

On 9 February 2026 Watts, as Minister of Energy, announced that the Government would invest in building a new liquefied natural gas import facility in Taranaki, which would be funded by a levy on electricity of between $2 and $4/MWh. The facility is expected to be finished in mid-2027 or 2028.

On 5 May 2026, Watts and RMA Reform Minister Chris Bishop issued local councils with a three-months timeframe to develop amalgamation plans.

On 13 August 2026, Watts became Minister for Building and Construction after Chris Penk was dismissed from his portfolios following an unsuccessful leadership challenge against Prime Minister Christopher Luxon.

=== Third term, 2026-present ===
During the 2026 New Zealand general election, Watts contested the North Shore electorate for National. He was ranked 13th on the National Party list. On 7 November, he retained North Shore for National by a margin of 11,151 votes based on preliminary results.

== Personal life ==
Watts is married with two sons. His wife works in marketing.

New Zealand Parliament
Preceded by Maggie Barry	Member of Parliament for North Shore; 2020–present	Incumbent
Political offices
Preceded by Barbara Edmonds	Minister of Revenue; 2023–present	Incumbent
Preceded by James Shaw	Minister of Climate Change; 2023–present	Incumbent
