= Bruce Cliffe =

New Zealand politician (1946–2022)

The Honourable Bruce Cliffe

Member of the New Zealand Parliament for North Shore
- In office 1990–1996
- Preceded by: George Gair
- Succeeded by: Wayne Mapp

Personal details
- Born: Bruce Windsor Cliffe; 24 September 1946 Auckland, New Zealand
- Died: 13 July 2022 (aged 75) Auckland, New Zealand
- Party: United New Zealand (1995–1996)
- Other political affiliations: National (until 1995)

Bruce Windsor Cliffe (24 September 1946 – 13 July 2022) was a New Zealand businessman and politician.

== Early life ==
Cliffe was born in Auckland in 1946. His parents were Mervyn Walter and Hilda Frances Cliffe. He received his education at Campbells Bay School, Murrays Bay Intermediate, and Takapuna Grammar School. He graduated from the University of Auckland in 1969 with a Bachelor of Arts. In 1971, he obtained a certificate in management studies from Templeton College, Oxford.

Cliffe married Josephine Jessie Winefield in 1969. They were to have one son and two daughters.

== Member of Parliament ==
New Zealand Parliament
Years	Term	Electorate	Party
1990–1993	43rd	North Shore	National
1993–1995	44th	North Shore	National
1995–1996	Changed allegiance to:		United NZ

Cliffe was a Member of Parliament for the National Party from 1990 to 1996. In 1990 he replaced the retiring George Gair in the North Shore seat, and was re-elected in 1993. He became a Cabinet Minister in December 1993 holding the portfolios of Accident Compensation, Radio & Television, and Associate Finance.

In 1994 he proposed Water Services Limited (Auckland Emergency water supply) bill.

In 1995, with the first mixed-member proportional (MMP) representation election impending in 1996, he resigned his cabinet posts and was a founder member of the United New Zealand Party, initially led by Clive Matthewson. Cliffe then unsuccessfully sought to bring about a merger of ACT and United, along with other smaller "centre" or liberal parties to create a "united" centre party for the new MMP environment. In 1996 he chose to resign from Parliament. The United New Zealand Party lost all but Peter Dunne's seat in the 1996 election, and continued in Parliament under Dunne's leadership.

On 27–29 May 1995, he participated in "Wellington After the Quake" Conference (page 191).

== After politics ==
From 1997, Cliffe was the director of several businesses, including Northern Finance Limited, a property management company, and Millbank Technology Limited, trading as Zapmill.

In 2016, Cliffe expressed his disagreement with Living Earth getting a consent to process 75,000 tonnes of garden waste annually on Puketutu Island.

Cliffe died on 13 July 2022.

New Zealand Parliament
Preceded by George Gair	Member of Parliament for North Shore; 1990–1996	Succeeded by Wayne Mapp
