= North Shore (New Zealand electorate) =

- Single-member general constituency for the New Zealand House of Representatives
- Interactive map of boundaries from the 2026 election
- Formation: 1946
- Region: Auckland
- Character: Suburban
- Term: 3 years

Member for North Shore
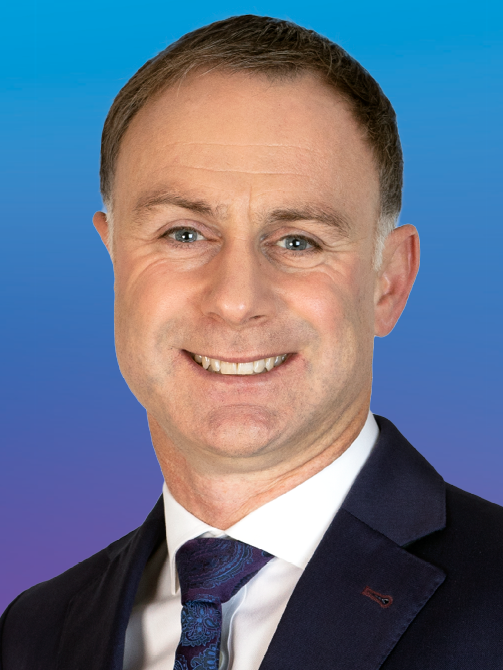
- Simon Watts since 17 October 2020
- Party: National
- Previous MP: Maggie Barry (National)
Party vote distribution

North Shore is a parliamentary electorate that returns one Member of Parliament to the New Zealand House of Representatives. The current MP for North Shore is Simon Watts of the National Party, who at the 2020 election was elected to succeed the retiring Maggie Barry, also of National.

== Population centres ==
The 1941 New Zealand census had been postponed due to World War II, so the 1946 electoral redistribution had to take ten years of population growth and movements into account. The North Island gained a further two electorates from the South Island due to faster population growth. The abolition of the country quota through the Electoral Amendment Act, 1945 reduced the number and increased the size of rural electorates. None of the existing electorates remained unchanged, 27 electorates were abolished, eight former electorates were re-established, and 19 electorates were created for the first time, including North Shore.

Map of boundaries at the 2020 and 2023 general elections

The boundaries of the North Shore electorate were last adjusted for the first election held using the mixed-member proportional (MMP) voting system in 1996, when the number of general electorates decreased from 95 (1993) to 60 (1996), and the electorate expanded to the north into an area previously belonging to East Coast Bays. No boundary adjustments were undertaken in the subsequent redistributions in 2002, 2007, and 2013/14. The 2025 Boundary Review saw the electorate gain Windsor Park from East Coast Bays.

North Shore stretches up the eastern coast of North Shore City in Auckland, starting in the south at Devonport and moving northwards to take in Stanley Point, Narrow Neck, Bayswater, Belmont, Hauraki, Takapuna, Lake Pupuke, Milford, Castor Bay, Campbells Bay, Sunnynook and Mairangi Bay. North Shore is predominantly European and Asian, and has an average income high above the national average, boasting some of the most expensive real estate in the country.

== History ==
The seat has been contested at every election in New Zealand since 1946, and except for a single victory by future Labour Attorney-General Martyn Finlay in its first contest, has been safely held by the National Party ever since.

Wayne Mapp held the electorate from 1996 until his retirement in 2011. He was succeeded by Maggie Barry, who won the 2011 and 2014 elections.

=== Members of Parliament ===
Unless otherwise stated, all MPs terms began and started at general elections.

Key

Labour National United NZ NZ First Mauri Pacific ACT

Election	Winner
1946 election	Martyn Finlay
1949 election	Dean Eyre
1951 election	Dean Eyre
1954 election	Dean Eyre
1957 election	Dean Eyre
1960 election	Dean Eyre
1963 election	Dean Eyre
1966 election	George Gair
1969 election	George Gair
1972 election	George Gair
1975 election	George Gair
1978 election	George Gair
1981 election	George Gair
1984 election	George Gair
1987 election	George Gair
1990 election	Bruce Cliffe
1993 election	Bruce Cliffe
1996 election	Wayne Mapp
1999 election	Wayne Mapp
2002 election	Wayne Mapp
2005 election	Wayne Mapp
2008 election	Wayne Mapp
2011 election	Maggie Barry
2014 election	Maggie Barry
2017 election	Maggie Barry
2020 election	Simon Watts
2023 election	Simon Watts

=== List MPs ===
Members of Parliament elected from party lists in elections where that person also unsuccessfully contested the North Shore electorate. Unless otherwise stated, all MPs terms began and ended at general elections.

Election	Winner
1996 election	Ann Batten
1996 election	Derek Quigley
1999 election	Helen Duncan
2002 election	Helen Duncan
2002 election	Deborah Coddington
2002 election	Barbara Stewart
2008 election	John Boscawen
2008 election	Phil Twyford
2011 election	Andrew Williams

== Election results ==
=== 2026 election ===
The next election will be held on 7 November 2026. Candidates for North Shore are listed at Candidates in the 2026 New Zealand general election by electorate § North Shore. Official results will be available after 27 November 2026.

=== 2023 election ===
2023 general election: North Shore
Notes:	Blue background denotes the winner of the electorate vote. Pink background denotes a candidate elected from their party list. Yellow background denotes an electorate win by a list member, or other incumbent. A ✓ or ✗ denotes status of any incumbent, win or lose respectively.						
Party	Candidate	Votes	%	±%	Party votes	%	±%
National	✓ Simon Watts	24,892	60.76	+14.57	21,050	50.79	+16.74
Labour	George Hampton	8,562	20.90		7,318	17.65	−23.70
Green	Pat Baskett	3,663	8.94		4,851	11.70	+3.36
ACT	Anna Yallop	2,061	5.03		4,540	10.95	+1.09
Opportunities	Abe Gray	1,229	3.00		1,604	3.87	+1.97
NZ First					1,055	2.54	+0.64
Te Pāti Māori					209	0.50	+0.25
NZ Loyal					207	0.49	
NewZeal					133	0.32	+0.24
Legalise Cannabis					111	0.26	+0.10
Freedoms NZ					53	0.12	
New Conservatives					53	0.12	−1.09
Animal Justice					48	0.11	
Women's Rights					42	0.10	
DemocracyNZ					35	0.08	
New Nation					24	0.05	
Leighton Baker Party					7	0.01	
Informal votes		559			100		
Total valid votes		40,966			41,440		
National hold	Majority	16,330	39.86				

=== 2020 election ===
2020 general election: North Shore
Notes:	Blue background denotes the winner of the electorate vote. Pink background denotes a candidate elected from their party list. Yellow background denotes an electorate win by a list member, or other incumbent. A ✓ or ✗ denotes status of any incumbent, win or lose respectively.						
Party	Candidate	Votes	%	±%	Party votes	%	±%
National	Simon Watts	19,202	46.19	−13.55	14,411	34.05	−23.65
Labour	Romy Udanga	15,468	37.21	+9.71	17,498	41.35	+15.33
Green	Liz Rawlings	2,595	6.24		3,530	8.34	+1.73
ACT	Nick Kearney	1,596	3.84	+2.27	4,172	9.86	+8.92
Opportunities	Shai Navot	1,493	3.59	−0.56	806	1.90	−0.49
New Conservative	Mike Brewer	791	1.90		511	1.21	+0.99
Advance NZ	Megan Elspeth Osborn	201	0.48		230	0.54	+0.50
Outdoors	Sue Dick	138	0.33		26	0.06	+0.02
Sustainable NZ	Mari Huusko	87	0.21		38	0.09	
NZ First					802	1.90	−3.35
Māori Party					104	0.25	−0.01
TEA					80	0.19	
Legalise Cannabis					66	0.16	−0.02
ONE					32	0.08	
Vision NZ					7	0.02	
Social Credit					5	0.01	−0.02
Heartland					1	0.00	
Informal votes		663			178		
Total valid votes		41,571			42,319		
Turnout		42,617	83.01	+2.50			
National hold	Majority	3,734	8.98	−23.26			

=== 2017 election ===
2017 general election: North Shore
Notes:	Blue background denotes the winner of the electorate vote. Pink background denotes a candidate elected from their party list. Yellow background denotes an electorate win by a list member, or other incumbent. A ✓ or ✗ denotes status of any incumbent, win or lose respectively.						
Party	Candidate	Votes	%	±%	Party votes	%	±%
National	✓ Maggie Barry	23,564	59.74	−2.73	23,009	57.70	−3.88
Labour	Romy Udanga	10,848	27.50	+8.38	10,375	26.02	+11.84
NZ First	Josh Hubbard	2,108	5.34	—	2,097	5.25	−0.57
Opportunities	Matt Isbister	1,639	4.15	—	953	2.39	—
ACT	Nick Kearney	621	1.57	+0.06	372	0.94	−0.47
Logic Party	Miriam Clements	166	0.43	—			
Green					2,638	6.61	−4.06
Māori Party					103	0.26	−0.19
Conservative					86	0.22	−4.12
Legalise Cannabis					69	0.18	−0.09
United Future					22	0.06	−0.19
Outdoors					14	0.04	—
People's Party					13	0.04	—
Ban 1080					11	0.03	±0.00
Democrats					10	0.03	−0.06
Internet					9	0.03	−0.62
Mana					7	0.02	−0.63
Informal votes		493			83		
Total valid votes		39,439			39,871		
Turnout		40,136	80.51	+1.46			
National hold	Majority	12,716	32.24	−11.10			

=== 2014 election ===
2014 general election: North Shore
Notes:	Blue background denotes the winner of the electorate vote. Pink background denotes a candidate elected from their party list. Yellow background denotes an electorate win by a list member, or other incumbent. A ✓ or ✗ denotes status of any incumbent, win or lose respectively.						
Party	Candidate	Votes	%	±%	Party votes	%	±%
National	✓ Maggie Barry	23,783	62.47	+0.03	23,762	61.58	−0.58
Labour	Claire Szabó	7,280	19.12	−1.45	5,473	14.18	−2.05
Green	Brett Stansfield	3,728	9.79	+2.09	4,118	10.67	−0.18
Conservative	Melissa Perkin	2,199	5.78	+3.29	1,673	4.34	+2.11
ACT	Nick Kearney	575	1.51	−2.05	545	1.41	−0.51
Democrats	Tim Leitch	97	0.25	+0.25	34	0.09	+0.06
NZ First					2,246	5.82	+0.96
Internet Mana					250	0.65	+0.48 (Note: 2014 Internet Mana swing is relative to the votes for Mana in 2011; it shared a party list with Internet in the 2014 election.)
Maori Party					174	0.45	−0.15
Legalise Cannabis					103	0.27	−0.06
United Future					98	0.25	−0.23
Ban 1080					13	0.03	+0.03
Civilian					12	0.03	+0.03
Independent Coalition					4	0.01	+0.01
Focus					2	0.01	+0.01
Informal votes		412			78		
Total valid votes		38,074			38,585		
Turnout		38,585	78.49	+3.00			
National hold	Majority	16,503	43.34	+1.47			

=== 2011 election ===
2011 general election: North Shore
Notes:	Blue background denotes the winner of the electorate vote. Pink background denotes a candidate elected from their party list. Yellow background denotes an electorate win by a list member, or other incumbent. A ✓ or ✗ denotes status of any incumbent, win or lose respectively.						
Party	Candidate	Votes	%	±%	Party votes	%	±%
National	Maggie Barry	22,709	62.44	+0.59	23,113	62.16	+4.10
Labour	Ben Clark	7,481	20.57	−3.44	6,036	16.23	−5.17
Green	Pieter Watson	2,802	7.70	+1.50	4,035	10.85	+4.24
ACT	Don Brash	1,293	3.56	−0.41	714	1.92	−5.55
Conservative	Craig Jensen	904	2.49	+2.49	829	2.23	+2.23
NZ First	Andrew Williams	900	2.47	+0.89	1,806	4.86	+1.92
United Future	Damian Light	173	0.48	−0.20	179	0.48	−0.46
Libertarianz	Michael Murphy	108	0.30	+0.05	41	0.11	+0.03
Maori Party					223	0.60	+0.002
Legalise Cannabis					123	0.33	+0.07
Mana					62	0.17	+0.17
Democrats					12	0.03	+0.01
Alliance					8	0.02	−0.04
Informal votes		592			174		
Total valid votes		36,370			36,962		
National hold	Majority	15,228	41.87	+4.03			

Electorate (as at 26 November 2011): 48,963

=== 2008 election ===
2008 general election: North Shore
Notes:	Blue background denotes the winner of the electorate vote. Pink background denotes a candidate elected from their party list. Yellow background denotes an electorate win by a list member, or other incumbent. A ✓ or ✗ denotes status of any incumbent, win or lose respectively.						
Party	Candidate	Votes	%	±%	Party votes	%	±%
National	✓ Wayne Mapp	23,824	61.85		22,738	58.06	
Labour	Phil Twyford	9,250	24.01		8,381	21.40	
Green	Pieter Watson	2,389	6.20		2,590	6.61	
ACT	John Boscawen	1,528	3.97		2,927	7.47	
NZ First	Joe Gregory	612	1.59		1,149	2.93	
Family Party	Louise Cleary	514	1.33		176	0.45	
United Future	Damian Light	261	0.68		370	0.94	
Libertarianz	Michael Murphy	94	0.24		33	0.08	
RAM	Stephen Cooper	47	0.12		13	0.03	
Maori Party					234	0.60	
Progressive					165	0.42	
Bill and Ben					139	0.35	
Legalise Cannabis					104	0.27	
Kiwi					83	0.21	
Alliance					24	0.06	
Pacific					13	0.03	
Workers Party					10	0.03	
Democrats					9	0.02	
RONZ					4	0.01	
Informal votes		268			102		
Total valid votes		38,519			39,162		
National hold	Majority	14,574	37.84				

=== 2005 election ===
2005 general election: North Shore
Notes:	Blue background denotes the winner of the electorate vote. Pink background denotes a candidate elected from their party list. Yellow background denotes an electorate win by a list member, or other incumbent. A ✓ or ✗ denotes status of any incumbent, win or lose respectively.						
Party	Candidate	Votes	%	±%	Party votes	%	±%
National	✓ Wayne Mapp	21,975	59.56	+15.58	20,125	53.49	+26.06
Labour	Phil Twyford	12,274	33.26	+4.16	11,252	29.91	−1.36
United Future	Ross Tizard	865	2.34	−1.54	807	2.14	−4.81
ACT	Nick Kearney	835	2.26	−6.55	1,144	3.04	−11.09
Progressive	Paula Gillon	544	1.47	+0.61	261	0.69	−0.36
Maori Party	Raewyn Harrison	265	0.72		106	0.28	
Libertarianz	Michael Murphy	140	0.38		21	0.06	
Green					1,940	5.16	−1.28
NZ First					1,683	4.47	−5.70
Destiny					120	0.32	
Legalise Cannabis					55	0.15	−0.17
Christian Heritage					53	0.14	−0.70
One NZ					13	0.03	−0.02
99 MP					11	0.03	
Alliance					10	0.03	−0.78
Direct Democracy					10	0.03	
Family Rights					6	0.02	
Democrats					5	0.01	
RONZ					1	0.003	
Informal votes		430			90		
Total valid votes		36,898			37,623		
National hold	Majority	9,701	26.30	+11.42			

=== 2002 election ===
2002 general election: North Shore
Notes:	Blue background denotes the winner of the electorate vote. Pink background denotes a candidate elected from their party list. Yellow background denotes an electorate win by a list member, or other incumbent. A ✓ or ✗ denotes status of any incumbent, win or lose respectively.						
Party	Candidate	Votes	%	±%	Party votes	%	±%
National	✓ Wayne Mapp	15,068	43.60		9,507	27.37	
Labour	Helen Duncan	9.970	28.85		10,841	31.20	
ACT	Deborah Coddington	3,018	8.73		4,897	14.10	
NZ First	Barbara Stewart	2,013	5.82		3,525	10.14	
Green	Richard A. Green	1,913	5.54		2,234	6.43	
United Future	Ross Tizard	1,329	3.85		2,408	6.93	
Christian Heritage	Mark Munroe	370	1.07		292	0.84	
Progressive	Lyndsay Brock	296	0.86		363	1.04	
Alliance	Karl Bartleet	287	0.08		282	0.81	
ORNZ					179	0.52	
Legalise Cannabis					112	0.32	
One NZ					18	0.05	
NMP					5	0.01	
Mana Māori					1	0.003	
Informal votes		295			75		
Total valid votes		34,559			34,739		
National hold	Majority	5,098					

=== 1999 election ===
Refer to Candidates in the New Zealand general election 1999 by electorate#North Shore for a list of candidates.

=== 1996 election ===
1996 general election: North Shore
Notes:	Blue background denotes the winner of the electorate vote. Pink background denotes a candidate elected from their party list. Yellow background denotes an electorate win by a list member, or other incumbent. A ✓ or ✗ denotes status of any incumbent, win or lose respectively.						
Party	Candidate	Votes	%	±%	Party votes	%	±%
National	Wayne Mapp	15,763	43.48		15,612	42.89	
ACT	Derek Quigley	5,415	14.94		5,015	13.78	
Alliance	Joel Cayford	4,897	13.51	−10.86	2,125	5.84	
Labour	Perry Cameron	4,375	12.07		7,518	20.65	
NZ First	Ann Batten	4,165	11.49		3,547	9.74	
Christian Coalition	Julie Belding	780	2.15		1,181	3.24	
Progressive Green	Cassandra Doherty	313	0.86		103	0.28	
McGillicuddy Serious	Felix Clark	263	0.73		87	0.24	
Green Society	Bradley Heising	109	0.30		50	0.14	
Superannuitants & Youth	Trevor Gilligan	88	0.24		41	0.11	
Natural Law	Gail Pianta	84	0.23		43	0.12	
United NZ					476	1.31	
Legalise Cannabis					456	1.25	
Ethnic Minority Party					71	0.20	
Animals First					50	0.14	
Conservatives					11	0.03	
Libertarianz					11	0.03	
Asia Pacific United					4	0.01	
Mana Māori					3	0.01	
Advance New Zealand					0	0.00	
Te Tawharau					0	0.00	
Informal votes		225			73		
Total valid votes		36,252			36,404		
National gain from United NZ	Majority	10,348	28.54				

=== 1993 election ===
1993 general election: North Shore
Party	Candidate	Votes	%	±%
National	Bruce Cliffe	10,168	45.50	−8.74
Alliance	Joel Cayford	5,445	24.37	
Labour	Carl Harding	4,132	18.49	
NZ First	Richard Stevens	1,851	8.28	
Christian Heritage	Mary-Anne Gladwell	341	1.52	
McGillicuddy Serious	Barry Bryant	288	1.28	
Natural Law	Gail Pianta	118	0.52	
Majority		4,723	21.13	−6.95
Turnout		22,343	86.67	+0.06
Registered electors		25,778		

=== 1990 election ===
1990 general election: North Shore
Party	Candidate	Votes	%	±%
National	Bruce Cliffe	11,944	54.24	
Labour	Graeme Ransom	5,761	26.16	−19.22
Green	Tony Dunlop	2,943	13.36	
NewLabour	Barry Kirker	882	4.00	
Democrats	Sandra Ann Ewan-Willis	197	0.89	
McGillicuddy Serious	Simon Holroyd	168	0.76	
Independent	Blanche Victoria Holloway	124	0.56	
Majority		6,183	28.08	
Turnout		22,019	86.61	−0.88
Registered electors		25,422		

=== 1987 election ===
1987 general election: North Shore
Party	Candidate	Votes	%	±%
National	George Gair	10,589	48.62	+1.71
Labour	Graeme Ransom	9,883	45.38	
Democrats	F Holmes	861	3.95	
NZ Party	Stephen Greenfield	445	2.04	
Majority		920	4.22	−11.55
Turnout		21,778	87.49	−4.55
Registered electors		24,891		

=== 1984 election ===
1984 general election: North Shore
Party	Candidate	Votes	%	±%
National	George Gair	11,034	46.91	−1.21
Labour	Peter Harris	7,324	31.13	
NZ Party	Reg Davies	3,737	15.88	
Social Credit	Dick Ryan	1,371	5.82	−16.28
Independent	Malcolm Moses	54	0.22	
Majority		3,710	15.77	−2.58
Turnout		23,520	92.04	+2.42
Registered electors		25,553		

=== 1981 election ===
1981 general election: North Shore
Party	Candidate	Votes	%	±%
National	George Gair	10,407	48.12	−2.76
Labour	Peter Chambers	6,438	29.77	
Social Credit	Dick Ryan	4,779	22.10	
Majority		3,969	18.35	−4.51
Turnout		21,624	89.62	+23.84
Registered electors		24,128		

=== 1978 election ===
1978 general election: North Shore
Party	Candidate	Votes	%	±%
National	George Gair	10,351	50.88	−5.37
Labour	Gene Anthony Thomas Leckey	5,701	28.02	
Social Credit	Ian Fraser	3,485	17.13	
Values	Virginia Horrocks	803	3.94	
Majority		4,650	22.86	−3.48
Turnout		20,340	65.78	−15.27
Registered electors		30,921		

=== 1975 election ===
1975 general election: North Shore
Party	Candidate	Votes	%	±%
National	George Gair	11,202	56.25	+4.69
Labour	Wyn Hoadley	5,955	29.90	
Values	Don Donnelly	1,581	7.93	
Social Credit	Ron Barnett	1,153	5.79	−1.39
Socialist Unity	Morris Mennell	22	0.11	
Majority		5,247	26.34	+14.18
Turnout		19,913	81.05	−8.72
Registered electors		24,568		

=== 1972 election ===
1972 general election: North Shore
Party	Candidate	Votes	%	±%
National	George Gair	9,665	51.56	−5.69
Labour	Colin Chiles	6,844	36.51	
Social Credit	Ron Barnett	1,346	7.18	+1.25
Values	S A W Brydon	816	4.35	
New Democratic	P B Smith	74	0.39	
Majority		2,281	12.16	−9.26
Turnout		18,745	89.77	−0.29
Registered electors		20,880		

=== 1969 election ===
1969 general election: North Shore
Party	Candidate	Votes	%	±%
National	George Gair	10,595	57.25	+8.18
Labour	Donald Frederick Dugdale	6,631	35.83	
Social Credit	Ron Barnett	1,098	5.93	
Independent	Odette Vivienne Leather	180	0.97	
Majority		3,964	21.42	+14.83
Turnout		18,504	90.06	+3.94
Registered electors		20,545		

=== 1966 election ===
1966 general election: North Shore
Party	Candidate	Votes	%	±%
National	George Gair	8,240	49.07	
Labour	Michael Bassett	7,132	42.47	
Social Credit	Eva Hill	1,418	8.44	+3.96
Majority		1,108	6.59	
Turnout		16,790	86.12	−4.89
Registered electors		19,494		

=== 1963 election ===
1963 general election: North Shore
Party	Candidate	Votes	%	±%
National	Dean Eyre	9,301	55.25	+1.27
Labour	Reginald Keeling	6,544	38.87	
Social Credit	Eva Hill	755	4.48	
Liberal	J E Pasley	234	1.39	
Majority		2,757	16.37	+5.13
Turnout		16,834	91.01	+0.09
Registered electors		18,495		

=== 1960 election ===
1960 general election: North Shore
Party	Candidate	Votes	%	±%
National	Dean Eyre	8,727	53.98	+4.66
Labour	Peter Lawrence Smith	6,910	42.74	−3.78
Social Credit	Arthur Richards	431	2.66	−0.64
Independent	Blanche Victoria Holloway	97	0.60	−0.25
Majority		1,817	11.24	+8.44
Turnout		16,165	90.92	−3.52
Registered electors		17,778		

=== 1957 election ===
1957 general election: North Shore
Party	Candidate	Votes	%	±%
National	Dean Eyre	8,122	49.32	−3.09
Labour	Peter Lawrence Smith	7,660	46.52	
Social Credit	Arthur Richards	544	3.30	
Independent	Blanche Victoria Holloway	140	0.85	
Majority		462	2.80	−6.99
Turnout		16,466	94.44	+3.90
Registered electors		17,434		

=== 1954 election ===
1954 general election: North Shore
Party	Candidate	Votes	%	±%
National	Dean Eyre	7,463	52.41	−5.02
Labour	Arthur Faulkner	6,068	42.61	
Social Credit	Frank Procter	707	4.96	
Majority		1,395	9.79	−5.07
Turnout		14,238	90.54	−0.53
Registered electors		15,725		

=== 1951 election ===
1951 general election: North Shore
Party	Candidate	Votes	%	±%
National	Dean Eyre	8,328	57.43	+2.74
Labour	Richard Wrathall	6,173	42.56	
Majority		2,155	14.86	+5.48
Turnout		14,501	91.07	−4.00
Registered electors		15,922		

=== 1949 election ===
1949 general election: North Shore
Party	Candidate	Votes	%	±%
National	Dean Eyre	7,835	54.69	
Labour	Martyn Finlay	6,491	45.31	−5.56
Majority		1,344	9.38	
Turnout		14,326	95.07	+0.86
Registered electors		15,068		

=== 1946 election ===
1946 general election: North Shore
Party	Candidate	Votes	%	±%
Labour	Martyn Finlay	7,015	50.87	
National	Henry Thorne Morton	6,776	49.13	
Majority		239	1.73	
Turnout		13,791	95.93	
Registered electors		14,375		
