= George Gair =

New Zealand politician (1926–2015)

The Honourable George Gair CMG QSO
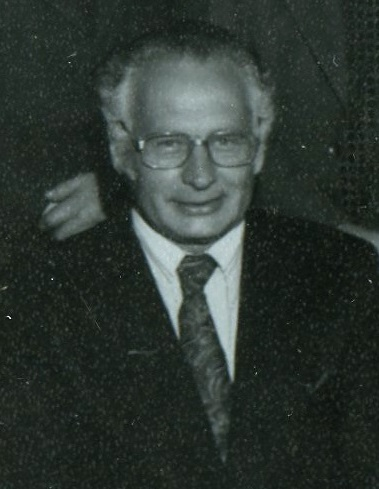
- Gair in 1977

3rd Mayor of North Shore City
- In office 14 October 1995 – 10 October 1998
- Preceded by: Paul Titchener
- Succeeded by: George Wood

19th High Commissioner of New Zealand to the United Kingdom
- In office 3 June 1991 – April 1994
- Preceded by: Bryce Harland
- Succeeded by: John Collinge

12th Minister of Transport
- In office 11 December 1981 – 26 July 1984
- Prime Minister: Robert Muldoon
- Preceded by: Colin McLachlan
- Succeeded by: Richard Prebble

25th Minister of Health
- In office 13 December 1978 – 11 December 1981
- Prime Minister: Robert Muldoon
- Preceded by: Frank Gill
- Succeeded by: Aussie Malcolm

3rd Minister of Energy
- In office 8 March 1977 – 13 December 1978
- Prime Minister: Robert Muldoon
- Preceded by: Eric Holland
- Succeeded by: Bill Birch

11th Minister of Housing
- In office 12 December 1975 – 8 March 1977
- Prime Minister: Robert Muldoon
- Preceded by: Roger Douglas
- Succeeded by: Eric Holland

43rd Minister of Customs
- In office 9 February 1972 – 8 December 1972
- Prime Minister: Jack Marshall
- Preceded by: Lance Adams-Schneider
- Succeeded by: Mick Connelly

Member of the New Zealand Parliament for North Shore
- In office 26 November 1966 – 27 October 1990
- Preceded by: Dean Eyre
- Succeeded by: Bruce Cliffe

Personal details
- Born: George Frederick Gair; 13 October 1926 Dunedin, New Zealand
- Died: 17 August 2015 (aged 88) Auckland, New Zealand
- Party: National
- Spouse: Esther Mary Fay Levy
- Relations: Joanne Gair (daughter)
- Education: Victoria University; University of Auckland
- Occupation: Journalist

George Frederick Gair CMG QSO (13 October 1926 – 17 August 2015) was a New Zealand politician. He was once deputy leader of the National Party in the New Zealand Parliament, and was considered by many to be a possible contender for the leadership itself. He was known for his polite and diplomatic style, which often contrasted with the political situation around him – Michael Laws described him as "a refugee from the age of manners."

== Early life and family ==
Gair was born in Dunedin, but moved to Wellington when young. He was a graduate of Victoria University and University of Auckland. He worked as a journalist at The New Zealand Herald from 1945 to 1947 then travelled to Japan before moving to Melbourne where he worked for The Sun News-Pictorial from 1949 to 1950 before returning to New Zealand after accepting a position at the Auckland Star between 1950 and 1952. Gair married Esther Mary Fay Levy in about 1950, and the couple went on to have three children, including make-up artist and body painter Joanne Gair.

From 1952 to 1957 Gair was a public relations officer in Auckland. He also became involved in the organisational wing of the National Party, and briefly served on the parliamentary staff of Keith Holyoake from 1958 to 1960. From 1960 to 1966 he was the personal assistant to the general manager of Air New Zealand.

== Member of Parliament ==
New Zealand Parliament
Years	Term	Electorate	Party
1966–1969	35th	North Shore	National
1969–1972	36th	North Shore	National
1972–1975	37th	North Shore	National
1975–1978	38th	North Shore	National
1978–1981	39th	North Shore	National
1981–1984	40th	North Shore	National
1984–1987	41st	North Shore	National
1987–1990	42nd	North Shore	National

He was an organiser for the National Party in the Onehunga and Roskill electorates. He then became the deputy chairman of National's Auckland division and a dominion councillor of the party.

Gair first stood for the National Party nomination for the Remuera electorate in the 1966 election, losing the nomination to Allan Highet. Gair then went across the bridge and contested and won the North Shore nomination from retiring National MP Dean Eyre. He was successful, and was elected to Parliament that year. In 1969 he was appointed Parliamentary Under-Secretary of Education and Science.

=== Cabinet minister ===
In Parliament, Gair came to be regarded as a competent and diligent administrator. He briefly became Minister of Customs in 1972 at the end of the Second National government, but this was interrupted when National lost the 1972 election to the Labour Party under Norman Kirk. After National's defeat party leader Jack Marshall appointed Gair as Shadow Minister of Customs. Gair had supported Marshall for the leadership and liked him on a personal level, however by early 1974 had come to the belief that National would have a better chance of winning the next election under the then deputy leader Robert Muldoon. In the lead up to a leadership spill Gair advised Marshall that Muldoon had the numbers to win which led Marshall to retire from the leadership and not contest the leadership ballot. When Muldoon became leader he promoted Gair from 13th to 6th in the caucus rankings and switched him from Customs to Shadow Minister of Housing instead.

When National was returned to power in the 1975 election, Gair was returned to cabinet in the Third National government. Between that time and National's defeat in the 1984 election, Gair held a number of challenging portfolios, including serving as Minister of Health and Minister of Social Welfare. He also served as Minister of Housing, Minister of Energy, Minister of Transport, Minister of Railways and a number of other roles.

=== Political views ===
Gair also distinguished himself for some of his personal views. Gair, although a member of the country's main conservative party, generally adopted a "live and let live" approach to social and moral issues, rejecting what he saw as "intolerance" in some of his colleagues. These beliefs were especially noticeable when, in the late 1970s, Gair opposed measures to restrict abortion. Barry Gustafson, in his history of the National Party, called Gair "the most effective strategist of the parliamentary pro-abortion lobby".

Gair's support of abortion earned him the hostility of many National Party colleagues, including that of the party's leader, Robert Muldoon. Muldoon was already somewhat distrustful of Gair, as Gair had occasionally been spoken of as an alternative party leader. The political styles of Muldoon and Gair were radically different – Muldoon had a reputation as being tough and confrontational, while Gair was seen as polite and diplomatic. Some members of the party who disliked Muldoon's "dictatorial" style saw Gair as a possible alternative.

=== Colonels' Coup ===
In 1980, when a number of party dissidents began to plot against Muldoon's leadership, Gair was on the list of potential replacements. However, Gair was regarded as too liberal to gain majority support within the party. The dissidents eventually decided to encourage Brian Talboys, the party's deputy leader, to make a leadership bid (now called the "Colonels' Coup"). Gair was not involved in planning this bid, but was supportive of it, and worked hard to convince Talboys that a challenge was a good idea. In the end, however, Talboys bailed out, and the coup collapsed without a vote ever being taken. Gair continued to advocate a challenge, but Talboys was adamant that preserving party unity was more important than curbing Muldoon's damaging leadership style. Later, after Talboys had retired from politics, Gair supported another Muldoon opponent, Derek Quigley, to replace Talboys as deputy leader.

After National's defeat in 1984 Muldoon designated Gair Shadow Minister of Transport, Railways, Civil Aviation and Meteorological Services. Gair, among others, wished for Muldoon to be replaced as leader as soon as possible. This pressure resulted in a scheduled leadership election being brought forward from February 1985 to November 1984 despite Muldoon's objections. Gair, alongside Jim McLay, Jim Bolger and Bill Birch, entered the race to replace Muldoon as leader. However both Birch and himself were to drop out of contention prior to the election being held (with Gair's support generally transferring to McLay and Birch's to Bolger). Ultimately McLay was successful. Gair was appointed by McLay as Shadow Minister of Labour and Employment.

In a surprise reshuffle in February 1986, Gair (along with Muldoon ally Bill Birch) were demoted considerably. This was intended to make room for new, younger figures, who McLay hoped would "rejuvenate" the party. The move was highly damaging to McLay, however, as it placed both Gair and Birch directly in opposition to him. As two of the most experienced people in the National Party, the two were able to mobilise substantial support in favour of McLay's main rival, Jim Bolger. Bolger quickly defeated McLay, and Gair himself took the position of deputy leader. He was additionally given the coveted finance portfolio by Bolger.

=== Deputy leader ===
Shortly after Gair became deputy leader, he found himself at odds with a number of his colleagues once again. The Homosexual Law Reform Bill, a private bill by Labour's Fran Wilde to lift restrictions on homosexuality, was being hotly debated. Gair was somewhat ambivalent towards the bill, believing that while change was "long overdue", certain aspects of the bill went too far. On 2 July 1986, Gair's vote blocked a motion of closure on the bill, which would have brought it to a vote – because of bad weather, a number of the bill's supporters were unable to be in Parliament that day, and since a few votes could potentially decide the fate of the bill, Gair believed it unfair to let the vote go ahead. Had he voted for closure, the bill would probably have been defeated, and many of the bill's opponents therefore blamed Gair for its subsequent success. One week later, when the vote actually occurred, it passed only by a narrow majority – Gair himself eventually voted in favour. Gair found the entire episode highly stressful, and spoke of his desire for reconciliation.

Following National's loss at the 1987 election Gair was challenged for the position of deputy leader by Ruth Richardson. Rather than attempt to beat off the challenge, the genial Gair retired voluntarily and backed Bolger's preferred deputy Don McKinnon who narrowly defeated Richardson by a single vote to take his place as deputy leader. Deciding to retire at the end of the term, Gair opted to sit on the backbench. Bolger designated him as spokesperson for accident compensation.

== Diplomatic career ==
Gair retired from Parliament at the 1990 election. He later served as the High Commissioner to London. He lived in Northcross on the North Shore.

== Mayor of North Shore City ==
Gair served as the 3rd Mayor of North Shore City from 1995 until 1998, defeating incumbent Paul Titchener.

== Later life and death ==
In 2010 Gair completed a master's degree at Auckland University of Technology, with a thesis on managing change as a minister of the Crown supervised by Marilyn Waring and Grant Gillon. Gair died on 17 August 2015. His wife, Fay Gair, died in 2018.

== Honours and awards ==
In the 1988 Queen's Birthday Honours, Gair was made a Companion of the Queen's Service Order for public services. In the 1994 Queen's Birthday Honours, he was appointed a Companion of the Order of St Michael and St George.

== Notes ==
Political offices
Preceded by Paul Titchener	Mayor of North Shore City; 1995–1998	Succeeded by George Wood
Preceded by Colin McLachlan	Minister of Transport; 1981–1984	Succeeded by Richard Prebble
Preceded by Colin McLachlan	Minister of Railways; 1981–1984	Succeeded by Richard Prebble
Preceded by Frank Gill	Minister of Health; 1978–1981	Succeeded by Aussie Malcolm
Preceded by Eric Holland	Minister of Energy; 1977–1978	Succeeded by Bill Birch
Preceded by Roger Douglas	Minister of Housing; 1975–1977	Succeeded by Eric Holland
Preceded by Lance Adams-Schneider	Minister of Customs; 1972	Succeeded by Mick Connelly
New Zealand Parliament
Preceded by Dean Eyre	Member of Parliament for North Shore; 1966–1990	Succeeded by Bruce Cliffe
Diplomatic posts
Preceded by Bryce Harland	High Commissioner of New Zealand to the United Kingdom; 1991–1994	Succeeded by John Collinge
