= Maggie Barry =

New Zealand politician

The Honourable Maggie Barry ONZM
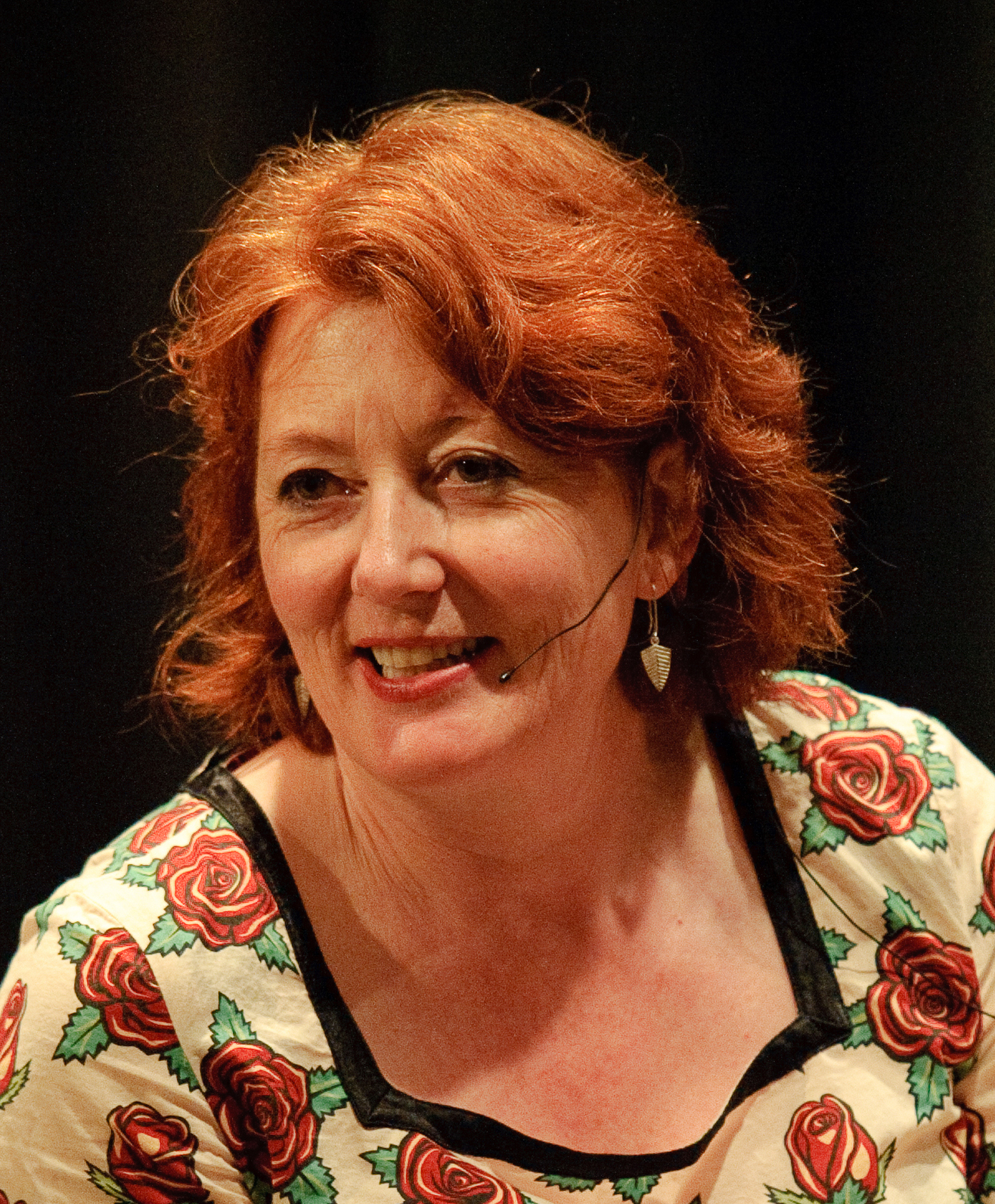
- Barry in 2010

11th Minister for Arts, Culture and Heritage
- In office 8 October 2014 – 26 October 2017
- Prime Minister: John Key; Bill English
- Preceded by: Chris Finlayson
- Succeeded by: Jacinda Ardern

13th Minister of Conservation
- In office 8 October 2014 – 26 October 2017
- Prime Minister: John Key; Bill English
- Preceded by: Nick Smith
- Succeeded by: Eugenie Sage

Member of the New Zealand Parliament for North Shore
- In office 26 November 2011 – 17 October 2020
- Preceded by: Wayne Mapp
- Succeeded by: Simon Watts
- Majority: 12,716

Personal details
- Born: Margaret Mary Barry; 5 October 1959 (age 67) Thorndon, Wellington, New Zealand
- Party: National Party
- Spouse: Grant Kerr
- Children: 1
- Occupation: Broadcaster; Politician
- Website: maggiebarry.co.nz

Margaret Mary Barry ONZM (born 5 October 1959), generally known as Maggie Barry, is a New Zealand radio and television presenter and politician.

As a member of the National Party Barry was elected to the House of Representatives in the 2011 general election for the seat of North Shore. During her term in the Fifth National Government she was the Minister for Conservation, Seniors Citizens, and Arts, Culture and Heritage. In 2020 she did not seek reelection.

Barry has had a long career in broadcasting, including gardening shows, and has a rose named after her.

== Early life ==
Barry's father was an accountant for the railways, and her mother was a florist. Both were strict Catholics. Barry was born in Wellington and went to Erskine College, a Roman Catholic school in Wellington.

== Broadcasting career ==
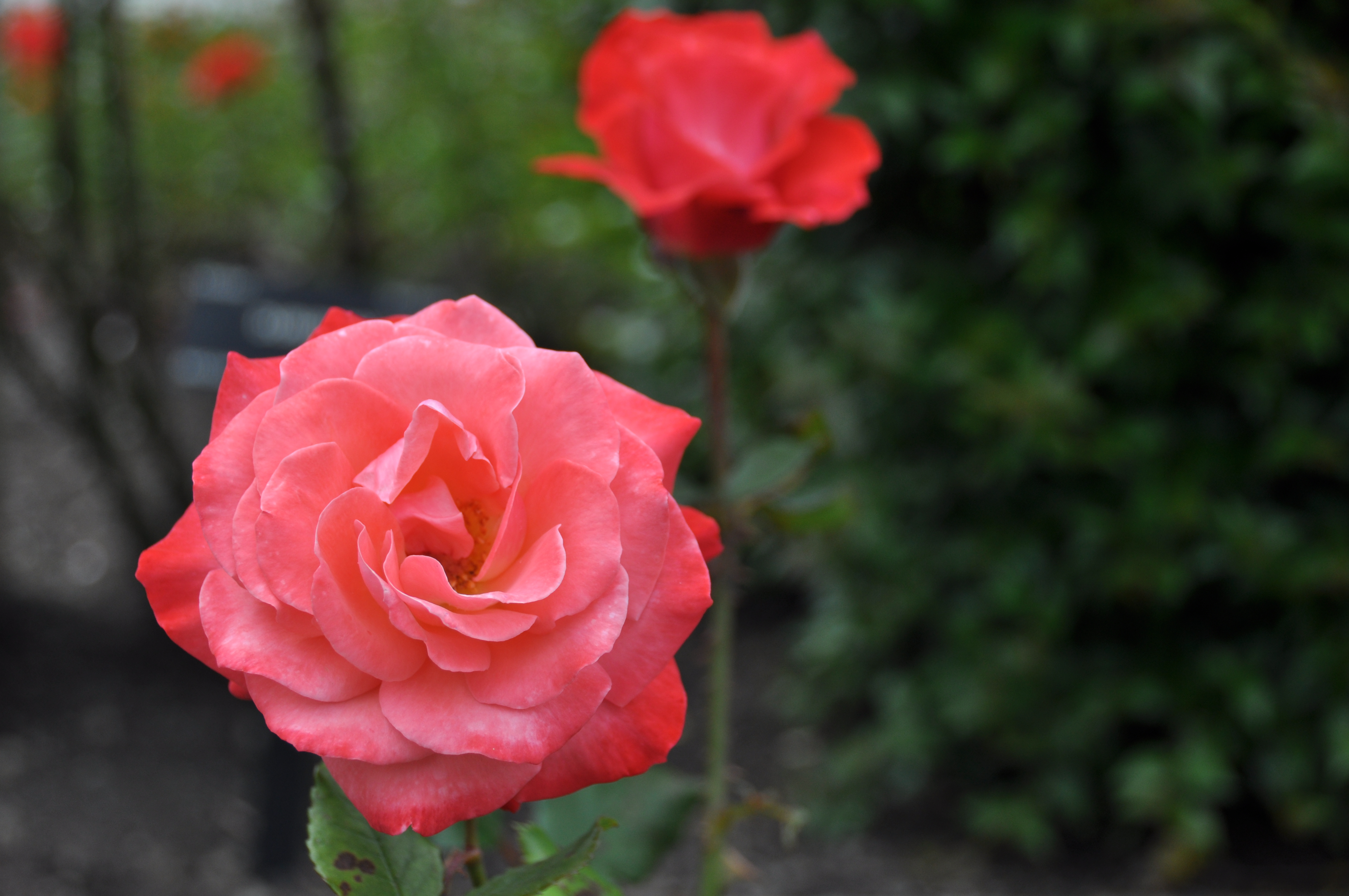
Maggie Barry, a Hybrid Tea rose named after her

Barry was a radio and television presenter for over 30 years. She began her broadcasting career in 1986 on National Radio's Morning Report and moved on to Nine to Noon in 1990. In 1992 she was a news interviewer for TV2's Counterpoint, and she was news presenter for Primetime in 1993.

Barry's garden show, originally titled Palmers Garden Show but renamed to Maggie's Garden Show, ran on TV ONE from 1991 to 2003, with her as co-producer and presenter. Featured were ‘bug man’ Ruud Kleinpaste, gardening experts Bill Ward, Jack Hobbs, Gordon Collier and Professor Thomas William Walker ("John Walker"). She also produced several television documentaries. In the 1996 Queen's Birthday Honours, Barry was appointed an Officer of the New Zealand Order of Merit, for services to broadcasting.

Barry has written for the New Zealand Listener since 2007, producing a fortnightly gardening column and occasional interview articles. She hosted Radio Live Drive from March 2009 to December 2010.

== Member of Parliament ==
New Zealand Parliament
Years	Term	Electorate	List	Party
2011–2014	50th	North Shore	57	National
2014–2017	51st	North Shore	40	National
2017–2020	52nd	North Shore	17	National

=== First term ===
Barry was interested in standing for the National Party in the 2011 Botany by-election, but did not become the candidate. She was selected as the National candidate for the safe seat of North Shore in May 2011 after the sitting MP Wayne Mapp decided not to run in the 2011 general election. Placed in number 57 on the National Party list, Barry was elected to Parliament by winning the electorate vote with an increased majority of 41.87% over her nearest rival, a Labour Party candidate. She also increased the Party Vote to 62.16%, 45.9% clear of the Labour Party.

Barry became a member of the Finance and Expenditure Select Committee upon entering parliament; she was appointed its Deputy Chairperson in 2013. In 2014 she became Chairperson of the Local Government and Environment Select Committee, and stood down from Finance and Expenditure and instead became a member of the Education and Science Select Committee.

During the 2011 election campaign Barry was spat at in Devonport, which appeared to shock her.

In July 2012, Barry was mocked on social media for suggesting during a debate on paid parental leave that Jacinda Ardern could not speak with authority on the subject because of her (then) childless status.

=== Second term, and promotion to Cabinet ===
On 6 October 2014, Prime Minister John Key appointed Barry to the portfolios of Minister for Arts, Culture & Heritage, Minister of Conservation, and Minister for Senior Citizens. She was ranked 20th in Cabinet under the Key Ministry. After Prime Minister Key's resignation, Prime Minister Bill English reshuffled the Cabinet. Barry retained all three of her portfolios and was ranked 16th.

==== Minister of Arts, Culture, and Heritage ====
World War I 100th anniversary celebrations have been taking place since Barry took office. As Minister she has been in charge of the World War 100 celebrations, which include commemorations within New Zealand and overseas. While World War 100 is based within the Arts, Culture, and Heritage Ministry, it relied on support from Ministry of Foreign Affairs and Trade, the New Zealand Defence Force and the Department of Internal Affairs.

When Bill English became Leader of the National Party, and subsequently Prime Minister, he disestablished the post of Minister of Broadcasting, absorbing it into Barry's Arts, Culture, and Heritage Portfolio.

==== Minister of Conservation ====
As Minister of Conservation, Barry launched Predator Free 2050, a programme to ensure that New Zealand's native animals were free from being attacked by predators. It looks at controlling predators using community volunteers, private residents, philanthropists and government investment. With over 80% of New Zealand's birds and reptiles endangered, Predator Free 2050 focuses on protecting these species from rats, stoats, possums, weasels and ferrets.

In 2015, Barry urged the SPCA to put down stray cats instead of just neutering and releasing them.

==== Minister for Senior Citizens ====
Under Prime Minister Bill English, National launched a policy to increase the superannuation age from 65 to 67. As Minister for Seniors much of the groundwork for implementing this policy falls under Barry's portfolio.

During the difficulties with the switch over from senior citizens being able to use their gold card on buses, to having to use an AT HOP card, Barry announced that the Ministry of Social Development, in which the Office of Seniors sits, would be assisting with the changeover.

=== Third term ===
After the 2017 general election, Barry retained her cabinet portfolios as Caretaker Minister. However once Winston Peters announced that he was to form a coalition with the Labour Party, National returned to opposition and Barry lost her government roles. She retained her position in the Party's ranks and her role within the Party as Spokesperson for Conservation.

Barry did retain her electorate seat with a majority of 12,716, down on 16,503 the previous election, despite her personal vote only falling by a few hundred. She was elected Deputy Chair of the Environment Select Committee.

During the 2018 leadership election, Barry ruled herself out as a contender and then endorsed Amy Adams as National leader. When Simon Bridges was elected leader, Barry was demoted to 25 on the party list from 17, and lost her spokesperson for conservation role. She instead picked up, Seniors, Veterans, and Associate Health. She was appointed as Deputy Chair of the Justice Select Committee on 21 March 2018, leaving the Environment Select Committee.

While on the Justice Select Committee Barry voiced her opposition to the End of Life Choice Bill, proposed by ACT's David Seymour, which would allow assisted suicide, a concept Barry had always been opposed to. During the hearings, Barry was accused of bias and being disparaging to submitters.

Barry faced accusations that she bullied staff during her time as a Minister and whilst in opposition – allegedly having been investigated for bullying twice in 2018. Barry vigorously denied the claims that she bullied staff and that she used derogatory terms to describe members of Auckland Council's local boards despite recordings showing evidence of this. Beyond this, it was also alleged that Barry used Parliamentary Services staff members to complete National Party work during working hours, which is against the law. She denied this allegation as well despite emails showing this was not the case.

The ex staffer who went to the media gave an exclusive interview to Radio New Zealand in which he spoke, under voice disguise, about how Barry treated him and other staff. He spoke of how 'It was Jekyll and Hyde stuff', and that another staff member left and took a personal grievance, which he did not know the outcome of. Two other former staffers came forward to support his allegations stated that as a Minister she would refer to Ministry staffers as 'hired help' and that she would scream at people and blame them for her mistakes.

Throughout the media attention on these issues Barry stated that 'I do not accept that there has been bullying and harassment in my workplace, I would not approve of that at all and I am not that kind of employer.' She emerged in a brief press conference backed by fellow MPs, Mark Mitchell, Simon O'Connor, and Nikki Kaye. Party leader, Simon Bridges continued to endorse her assurances of innocence.

A complaint was laid to the Auditor-General on 5 December 2018, that Barry had effectively misappropriated public funds for the use of party work by requiring Parliamentary Services staff to do Party work during Parliamentary hours, she was later cleared of any wrongdoing in a report released by Parliamentary Services in July 2019.

In June 2019, she was made the National Party's spokesperson for Disability Issues, in addition to her other portfolios.

In September 2019, Barry was again accused of bullying behaviour this time by a fellow MP on behalf of one of their party colleagues. Senior Labour MP, former Cabinet Minister, party Whip, and the Assistant Speaker, Hon Ruth Dyson, told media that Barry had "stood and started yelling then and yelled pretty much down to the table, and then just carried on yelling at me, standing right next to the table". Dyson accepted the apology which Barry gave to her via a speech in the House. Labour MP, Kieran McAnulty said Barry by "openly and aggressively verbally and physically challenging" had breached standing orders, and he intended to recommend the privileges committee censure her.

In early November 2019, Barry announced that she would not be standing for re-election at the 2020 general election.

== Personal life ==
Barry is married to Grant Kerr, who is a lawyer. She has a son.

Rosa 'Maggie Barry' is a dark pink hybrid tea rose named after Barry. In the late 1990s she was a lay representative from the National Health Committee advising the Minister of Health, and was involved in reports on palliative care, cancer, and maternity services. She was the Chair of the Board of the New Zealand Book Council in 2006. Barry has been a patron for the Mary Potter Hospice, Alzheimer's Wellington, and Hospice New Zealand.

On 4 July 2014, Barry said that she was groped by Australian entertainer Rolf Harris when he was in New Zealand during the 1980s and she was recording an interview she hosted from Palmerston North. She said that Harris "came into the studio and they sat down and then he started to do the old wandering hands thing and she stood up and said 'well you can stop that right now'." Barry also said that he turned nasty on her before switching his charm back for the interview. At the time, a similar celebrity sexual conduct case was in the news, and retired parliamentarian Rodney Hide taunted Barry in his newspaper column, urging her to use her parliamentary privilege to breach the name suppression order against the defendant in the Queenstown suppressed indecency case.

In January 2024, an Air New Zealand flight that Barry was on was delayed. It was reported that Barry had failed to comply with crew instructions and became abusive towards staff. The flight left forty minutes late after Police were called and spoke to Barry. Barry denied being abusive to airline staff and claimed the situation was a "misunderstanding".

New Zealand Parliament
Preceded by Wayne Mapp	Member of Parliament for North Shore; 2011–2020	Succeeded by Simon Watts
Political offices
Preceded by Chris Finlayson	Minister for Arts, Culture and Heritage; 2014–2017	Succeeded by Jacinda Ardern
Preceded by Nick Smith	Minister of Conservation; 2014–2017	Succeeded by Eugenie Sage
Preceded by Jo Goodhew	Minister for Seniors; 2014–2017	Succeeded by Tracey Martin
