= Paul Titchener =

Ian Paul Titchener (born 1941) JP was Mayor of North Shore City, New Zealand, from 1992 to 1995, having been a North Shore City Councillor from 1989 to 1992. He was also on the Auckland Harbour Board from 1983 to 1989, and the Auckland Regional Council from 1988 to 1992.

He was born in Auckland on 7 April 1941 and educated at Takapuna Grammar School and Massey Agricultural College (DipAg). He married Prudence Valintine in 1964.

He is a yachtsman and past chairman of the Auckland Maritime Trust Museum, and has written several books on maritime history. He was awarded the Cowan Memorial Prize for historical journalism in 1979.

Political offices
| Preceded by Ann Hartley | Mayor of North Shore City; 1992–1995 | Succeeded by George Gair |
