= Tim Groser =

New Zealand politician and ambassador (born 1950)

The Honourable Tim Groser
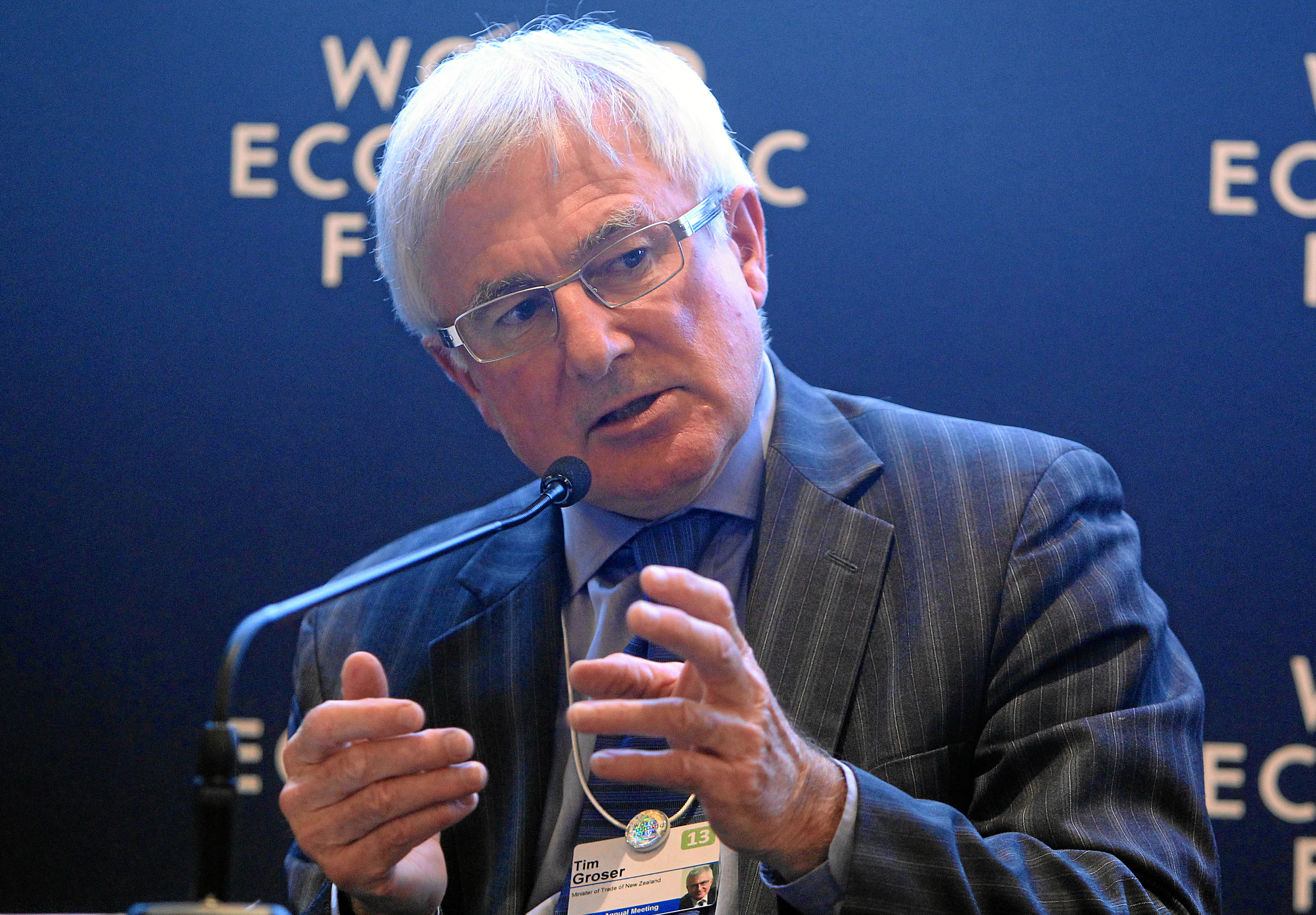
- Groser in 2013

New Zealand Ambassador to the United States
- In office 2016–2018
- Preceded by: Mike Moore
- Succeeded by: Rosemary Banks

10th Minister of Trade
- In office 19 November 2008 – 14 December 2015
- Prime Minister: John Key
- Preceded by: Phil Goff
- Succeeded by: Todd McClay

4th Minister for Climate Change Issues
- In office 27 January 2010 – 14 December 2015
- Prime Minister: John Key
- Succeeded by: Paula Bennett

Minister of Conservation
- In office 19 November 2008 – 27 January 2010
- Prime Minister: John Key
- Preceded by: Steve Chadwick
- Succeeded by: Kate Wilkinson

Member of the New Zealand Parliament for National Party List
- In office 17 September 2005 – 19 December 2015
- Succeeded by: Maureen Pugh

Personal details
- Born: 6 March 1950 (age 76) Perth, Scotland
- Party: National
- Spouse: Milda Emza (m. 1996; div.)
- Relations: John Groser (grandfather)

Timothy John Groser (born 6 March 1950) is a New Zealand former politician and diplomat. A member of the New Zealand National Party, Groser was a Member of Parliament between 2005 and 2015. He held the offices of Minister of Trade, Minister of Conservation, and Minister for Climate Change in the Fifth National Government.

Previously, Groser was a diplomat with the Ministry of Foreign Affairs and Trade and served as New Zealand's ambassador to the World Trade Organization from 2002 to 2005 and ambassador to Indonesia from 1994 to 1997. He resigned from Parliament on 19 December 2015 to take up the role of New Zealand's ambassador to the United States of America, which he held from January 2016 until August 2018, when he retired.

== Early life and education ==
Groser was born in Perth, Scotland, and came to New Zealand with his parents Antony and Joanna Groser (née Derrill), who were professional actors, in 1958. As a child, Groser acted in radio dramas, on the television soap opera Close to Home, and with the Downstage theatre company in Wellington. He attended Hutt Valley High School and completed his education at Victoria University of Wellington, where he was a left-wing student activist and president of the university's socialist society. By the age of 21, he later claimed, he had changed his allegiance to the National Party. Groser graduated with a degree in economic history and began, but abandoned, a PhD in economics ahead of the birth of his first child.

== Career ==
For more than thirty years, Groser was a public servant and diplomat. He started as a junior economist with the Treasury before joining the Ministry of Foreign Affairs where he was a negotiator on the Closer Economic Relations free trade agreement between Australia and New Zealand. From 1982 to 1984 he was principal foreign policy advisor to prime ministers Robert Muldoon and David Lange. One of Groser's responsibilities under Muldoon was developing a reform to the global monetary system, similar to the Breton Woods agreement, for which Muldoon had been a long advocate.

In the 1980s he was posted in Geneva as New Zealand's chief agricultural negotiator in the GATT Uruguay round before being promoted to Chief Negotiator midway through negotiations. The success of this round on New Zealand's export economy led to Groser being nicknamed "the billion-dollar man" for the associated one per cent rise in New Zealand's gross domestic product. He subsequently became New Zealand's ambassador to Indonesia from 1994 to 1997. As ambassador, Groser was involved in asylum negotiations for five East Timorese men who, in seeking to come to New Zealand, scaled the perimeter of the New Zealand embassy and occupied it for several days and were eventually given asylum in Portugal. Groser's mission in Indonesia ended at the beginning of the 1997 Asian financial crisis.

Returning to New Zealand, he was chief economic advisor for the Ministry of Foreign Affairs and worked on the Agreement between New Zealand and Singapore on a Closer Economic Partnership in 1999, leading the first three negotiation rounds in October and November 1999. He left the ministry at the end of 1999 to be executive director of the Asia 2000 Foundation (now the Asia New Zealand Foundation), a post The Dominion described as "increasingly seen as a career springboard for diplomats". As the head of Asia 2000, Groser stated that the Singapore–New Zealand free trade agreement was "a trojan horse" for "the real negotiating end-game: a possible new trade bloc encompassing all of South East Asia and Australia and New Zealand." A free trade agreement between ASEAN nations, Australia, and New Zealand was later negotiated and entered into force in 2010, during Groser's first term as trade minister.

Between 2002 and 2005, Groser returned to Geneva on appointment as New Zealand's Ambassador to the World Trade Organization (WTO). He also served as the chair of the WTO's rules committee from 2002 and chair of its agricultural negotiations committee from 2004. He was heavily involved in the early years of the Doha round of discussions, which are still ongoing "on paper". In a 2003 profile in The New Zealand Herald, Groser described his trade negotiations philosophy as being "about intimidation—manipulation towards good ends of course—and building consensus and getting people to see the wood for the trees." Canada's chief agricultural negotiator Steve Verheul credited Groser with securing agreement in principle to the gradual elimination of agricultural export subsidies in 2004.

While receiving praise from senior figures in the Labour government at the time of his appointments to the two WTO chairs, Groser's 2005 announcement that he would contest that year's general election for the National Party was met with "anger" from the government. Trade negotiations minister Jim Sutton said he felt a "strong sense of betrayal" from Groser's decision and asked for Groser's resignation as ambassador. Prime minister Helen Clark called for Groser to be removed from his WTO chairs, which were separate to his ambassadorship. Groser resigned his ambassadorship in May 2005 but continued as WTO agriculture chair until the government officially removed its support of him after the conclusion of agriculture meetings in July.

== Member of Parliament ==
New Zealand Parliament
Years	Term	Electorate	List	Party
2005–2008	48th	List	13	National
2008–2011	49th	List	15	National
2011–2014	50th	List	12	National
2014–2015	51st	List	14	National

In 2005, Groser opted to leave the public service and run for Parliament, stating that being a member of Parliament had been a job he had coveted for thirty years. He was selected to stand as a list-only candidate for the National Party in the 2005 election and placed 13th on the list, the highest newcomer. As a serving diplomat and senior public servant, Groser's decision to become a politician was controversial. Columnist Fran O'Sullivan wrote that the Labour Party's prime minister and trade minister were upset because they had mistakenly believed Groser to have been a supporter of their own party. Groser said he had supported National since he was 21 and that he was encouraged to stand for election by both a senior minister from another country's government and by National Party president Judy Kirk. New Zealand Herald reporter Audrey Young claimed Groser was recruited specifically to be trade minister in a Don Brash-led National government.

On 17 September 2005, National won 39.1% of the party vote and Groser was comfortably elected as a list MP. In parliament, he generally held liberal views, especially on trade. In his maiden speech, delivered on 15 November 2005, he stated his "view of politics [is one] that does not deny the importance of social change—provided it is examined critically and not adopted like some transitory fashion item—and seeks to put the primary, not the sole, emphasis for individual social and economic outcomes on the individual, and not transfer that responsibility to the State." In his 2011 delivery of the Ralph Hanan lecture, Groser further set out his views that "trade is about specialisation ... the heart and soul of productivity growth, which in turn is the key to the elimination of absolute poverty." Politically, Groser supported the National Party being more centrist than right-leaning. In personal votes, Groser opposed raising the age for purchasing alcohol from 18 to 20 in 2006, saying he did not think an age-change would solve alcohol issues in New Zealand, but changed his position to support that proposal when it reemerged in 2012. He opposed, like all National MPs, the introduction of a medical cannabis regime in 2009 but voted in support of legalising same-sex marriage in 2013.

National did not win the 2005 election and Groser was appointed the opposition spokesperson for arts, culture and heritage and associate spokesperson for foreign affairs and trade in the Brash shadow cabinet. He accompanied Labour Party trade minister Jim Sutton on a trade delegation to Hong Kong soon after the election and Sutton's successor, Phil Goff, on a delegation to the United States in 2006. From 2006, in the Key shadow cabinet, he was spokesperson for trade and associate spokesperson for finance. He sat on the foreign affairs, defence and trade committee from 2005 until 2008. In 2007, he denied having used cannabis while posted as ambassador to Indonesia, which has very strict drug laws, but admitted to using cannabis earlier in his life.

In the 2008, 2011 and 2014 general elections, Groser ran for National in the safe Labour seat of New Lynn. Fellow National list MP Christopher Finlayson would later write in his memoir that Groser was worried he would one day win the seat; Groser lost each election by an average of 4,590 votes but was re-elected each time as a list MP. After serving as trade minister in the Fifth National Government for seven years, Groser resigned from Parliament in December 2015 to serve as New Zealand's ambassador to the United States, which had been described by media for several months as a "widely expected" appointment. He left Parliament on 19 December 2015 without delivering a valedictory statement.

== Minister in the Fifth National Government ==
Groser was appointed Minister of Trade, Minister of Conservation, Associate Minister of Foreign Affairs and Minister Responsible for International Climate Change Negotiations in November 2008. He relinquished the conservation portfolio in January 2010, citing workload issues and amid criticisms that he was disinterested in the portfolio, and succeeded Nick Smith as Minister for Climate Change Issues in 2012. He held his post as trade minister until his retirement from Parliament in December 2015.

Groser made international headlines in late 2012 when he said that the New Zealand Government would not sign up for the second commitment period of the Kyoto Protocol. Groser said the 15-year-old agreement was outdated, and that New Zealand was "ahead of the curve" in looking for a replacement that would include developing nations. Groser attended the 2012 United Nations Climate Change Conference (COP-18) in Doha and 2015 United Nations Climate Change Conference (COP-21) in Paris, where New Zealand undertook further climate change commitments, including the Paris Agreement.

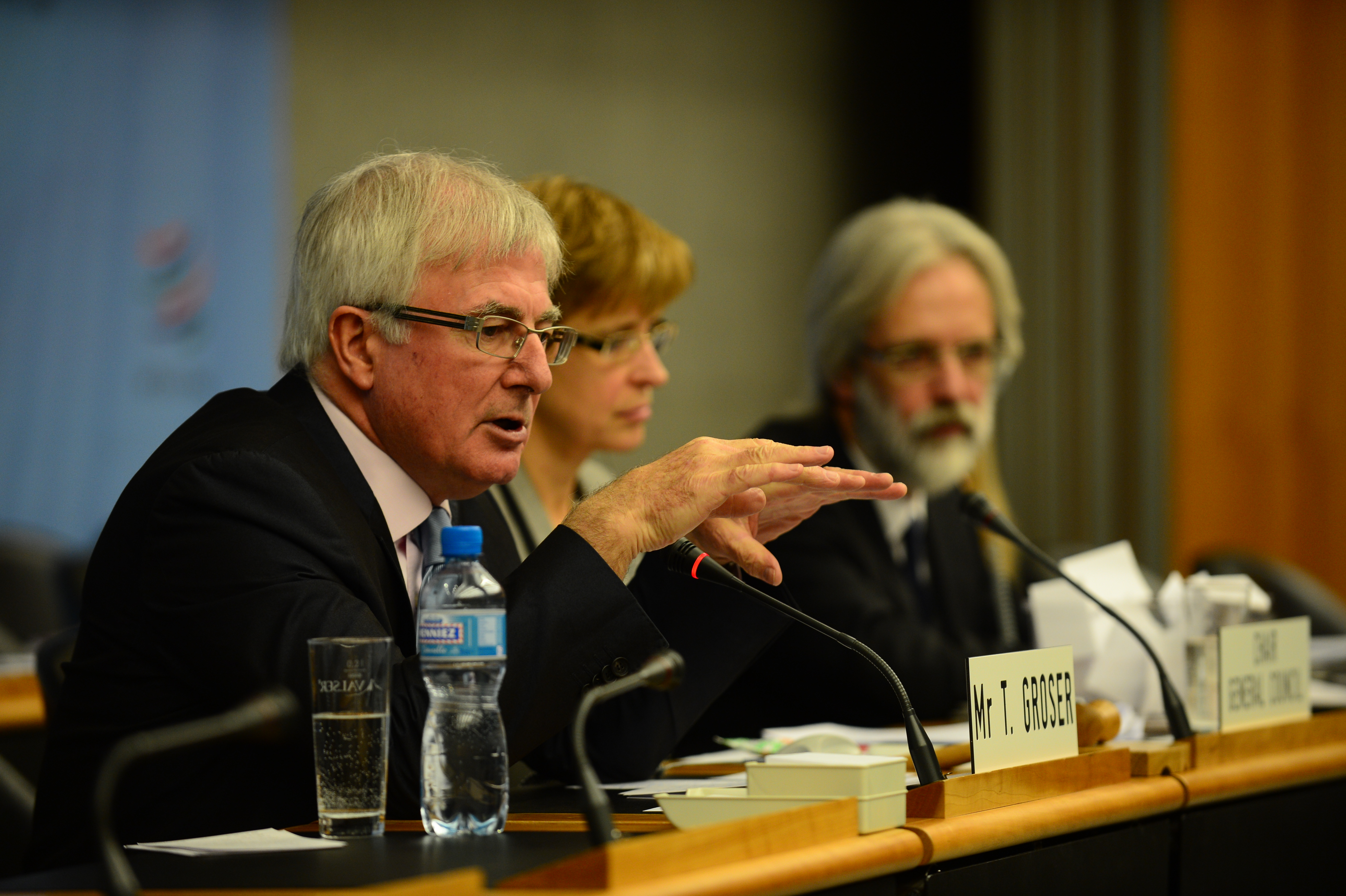
Groser speaking at the WTO Director-General selection process in 2013

In December 2012, the New Zealand Government announced that it was supporting Groser's bid to become the next Director-General of the World Trade Organization, a position which became vacant at the end of May 2013 with the retirement of Pascal Lamy. Groser's bid was eventually unsuccessful and the Brazilian diplomat Roberto Azevêdo was elected as the Director-General of the WTO in May 2013. On 22 March 2015, The Intercept news website claimed that New Zealand's signals intelligence agency, the Government Communications Security Bureau (GCSB), had spied on other WTO directorship contenders on behalf of Groser using the XKeyscore mass surveillance system. Known targets included candidates from Brazil, Costa Rica, Ghana, Jordan, Indonesia, Kenya, Mexico, and South Korea.

The spying was confirmed to have taken place, and to have been approved by Groser, in an inquiry led by the Inspector-General of Intelligence and Security, Cheryl Gwyn, in 2017. Gwyn's report said that the government had determined Groser's leadership of the WTO would "have a significant impact on New Zealand's economic well-being" and therefore endorsed his candidacy as an explicit "foreign policy decision". This enabled the government to ask the GCSB to gather intelligence to support Groser's campaign. The use of GCSB services was offered to Groser by the GCSB Director-General, Ian Fletcher, and accepted by Groser. Gwyn's report criticised the GCSB's record-keeping on this operation but said that it was not unlawful nor an improper use of resources. The report, and law enabling the use of spying, was criticised by Labour leader Andrew Little and media.

As trade minister, Groser was responsible for negotiations over the Trans-Pacific Partnership (TPP) trade agreement, which New Zealand eventually ratified in 2017. In July 2015, Groser said he believed reasonable people were being "whipped up into a frenzy" over issues like pharmaceutical costs and investor-state dispute settlement by people who, for ideological reasons, opposed the agreement. In interviews given after his ministerial career, Groser said that the TPP was the achievement he was most proud of during his time as trade minister.

Despite no official announcement having been made, New Zealand media reported in early 2015 that Groser was "widely expected" to replace Mike Moore as ambassador to the United States. This was confirmed by prime minister John Key on 7 December 2015, with Groser relinquishing his roles on 14 December. Groser took up his post as ambassador in early 2016. He was succeeded as trade minister by former diplomat Todd McClay and as climate change minister by Paula Bennett. Maureen Pugh filled Groser's list vacancy in Parliament.

== Post-parliamentary life ==
Groser resigned from Parliament on 19 December 2015 to take up the role of New Zealand's ambassador to the United States of America. He served a three-year appointment until August 2018. Foreign affairs minister Winston Peters denied that Groser had been recalled, stating that Groser had not sought an extension to his three-year term as ambassador. According to Stuff, the now Labour-led government was unhappy with Groser's failure in securing an exemption from the Trump Administration's steel tariffs. He was succeeded by career diplomat Rosemary Banks.

Back in New Zealand, Groser established a trade consultancy firm in 2019. On 10 July 2023, he welcomed New Zealand's recently signed free trade agreement with the European Union, stating that the "deal is more valuable strategically and politically than economically for the EU bloc, and helps New Zealand diversify away from China."

== Personal life ==
Groser has been married three times and has three children. He converted to Islam to marry Milda Emza, an Indonesian Muslim and his second wife, in 1996, during his tenure as ambassador to Indonesia.

Political offices
Preceded by Steve Chadwick	Minister of Conservation; 2008–2010	Succeeded by Kate Wilkinson
Preceded by Phil Goff	Minister of Trade; 2008–2015	Succeeded by Todd McClay
Preceded by Nick Smith	Minister for Climate Change Issues; 2012–2015	Succeeded by Paula Bennett
