= Minister of Climate Change =

New Zealand minister of the Crown

- Coat of arms of New Zealand

- Flag of New Zealand

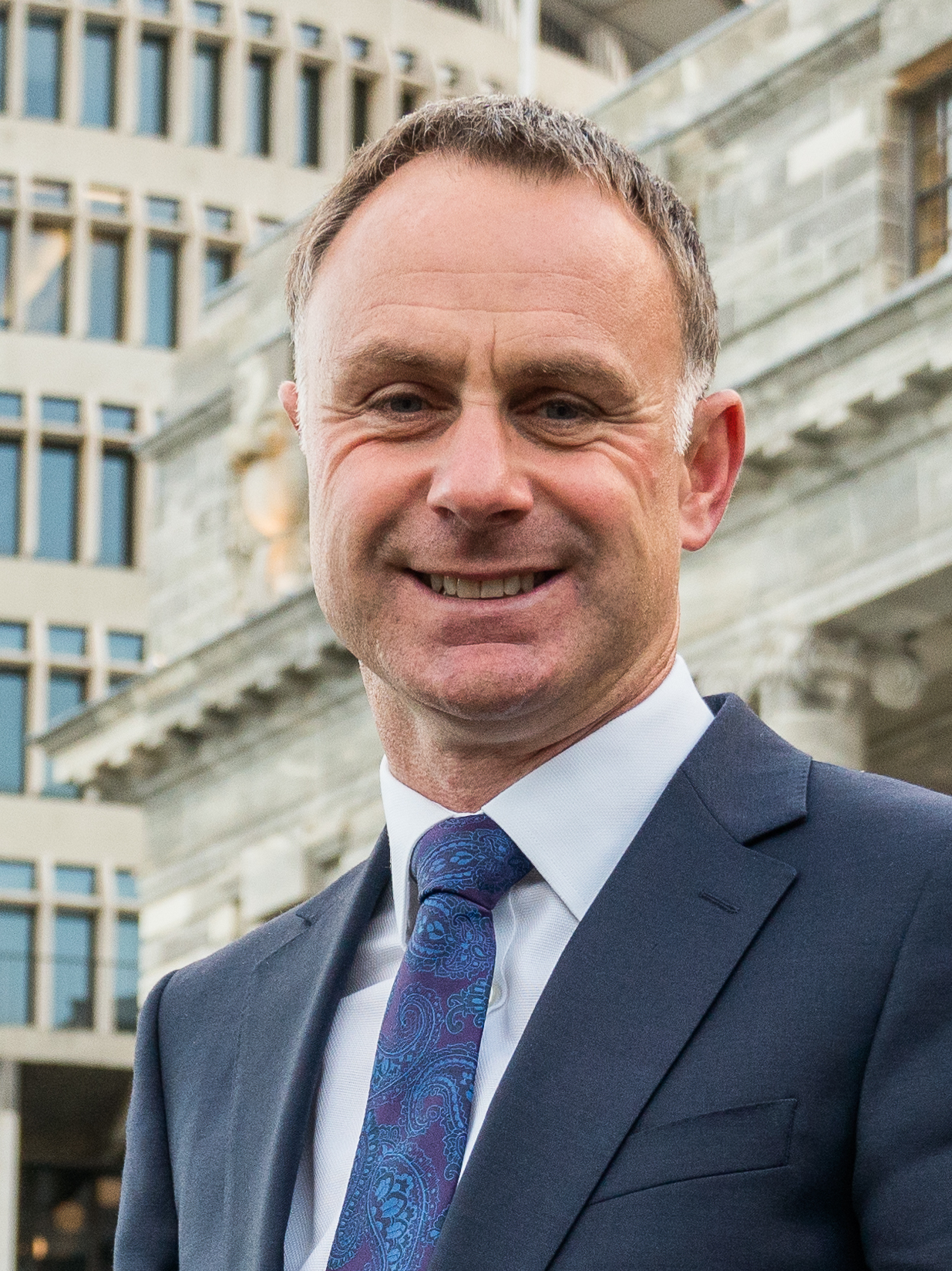
- Incumbent; Simon Watts since 27 November 2023
- Ministry for the Environment
- Style: The Honourable
- Member of: Executive Council
- Reports to: Prime Minister of New Zealand
- Appointer: Governor-General of New Zealand
- Term length: At His Majesty's pleasure
- Precursor: Convenor of Ministerial Group on Climate Change; Minister for Climate Change Issues; Minister for International Climate Change Negotiations
- Formation: 14 August 2002
- First holder: Pete Hodgson
- Salary: $288,900
- Website: beehive.govt.nz

The Minister of Climate Change is a minister in the New Zealand Government with responsibility for climate change policy. The position was formally established in 2005 as Minister responsible for Climate Change Issues, but was preceded by the informal role of Convenor of the Ministerial Group on Climate Change, which was held by the Minister of Energy Pete Hodgson.

The present Minister is Simon Watts.

== Responsibilities ==
The Minister of Climate Change has direct responsibility for the overall climate change policy direction at the domestic and international level. This includes responsibility for the New Zealand Emissions Trading Scheme under the Climate Change Response Act 2002 and for setting emissions budgets and preparing emissions reduction and national adaptation plans under the Climate Change Response (Zero Carbon) Amendment Act 2019.

Under the United Nations Framework Convention on Climate Change, the Minister is responsible for representing New Zealand in international negotiations on climate change.

== List of ministers ==
=== Minister of Climate Change ===
Key

Labour National Green

No.	Name	Portrait	Term of Office		Prime Minister
As Convenor of Ministerial Group on Climate Change
1	Pete Hodgson		14 August 2002	19 October 2005	Clark
As Minister responsible for Climate Change Issues
2	David Parker		19 October 2005	21 March 2006	Clark
(1)	Pete Hodgson; Acting		21 March 2006	3 May 2006	Clark
(2)	David Parker		3 May 2006	19 November 2008	Clark
As Minister for Climate Change Issues
3	Nick Smith		19 November 2008	21 March 2012	Key
–	Craig Foss; Acting		21 March 2012	2 April 2012	Key
4	Tim Groser		2 April 2012	14 December 2015	Key
5	Paula Bennett		14 December 2015	26 October 2017	Key
5	Paula Bennett		14 December 2015	26 October 2017	English
As Minister of Climate Change
6	James Shaw		26 October 2017	27 November 2023	Ardern
6	James Shaw		26 October 2017	27 November 2023	Hipkins
7	Simon Watts		27 November 2023	present	Luxon

=== Minister for International Climate Change Negotiations ===
Separate ministerial responsibility for International Climate Change Negotiations was established under the Fifth National Government, first through an Associate Minister role and then as a full Minister. The responsibilities associated with this portfolio were incorporated within the Climate Change Issues portfolio in 2012, after a brief period in which Tim Groser held both portfolios. At the time, Prime Minister John Key stated that the reason for the change in title was to address diplomatic misconceptions: "The reality is it partly in the sense that when he turns up at this meetings, people look at him and say `if you are the associate minister, where is the minister?' And of course when it comes to international negotiations, he is the minister."

No.	Name	Portrait	Title	Term of Office		Prime Minister
1	Tim Groser		Associate Minister for Climate Change Issues (International Negotiations)	24 November 2008	27 January 2010	Key
1	Tim Groser		Minister Responsible for International Climate Change Negotiations	27 January 2010	2 April 2012	Key
