= New Zealand Resident Doctors' Association =

NZRDA
- New Zealand Resident Doctors' Association
- Headquarters: Auckland, New Zealand
- Location: New Zealand
- Website: www.nzrda.org.nz

The New Zealand Resident Doctors' Association (NZRDA) is a trade union in New Zealand and represents the professional and industrial interests of Resident Medical Officers (RMOs), including trainee interns, house surgeons, senior house officers and registrars, in New Zealand District Health Boards.
