= Minister for Energy (New Zealand) =

New Zealand minister of the Crown

Minister for Energy of New Zealand
- Coat of arms of New Zealand

- Flag of New Zealand

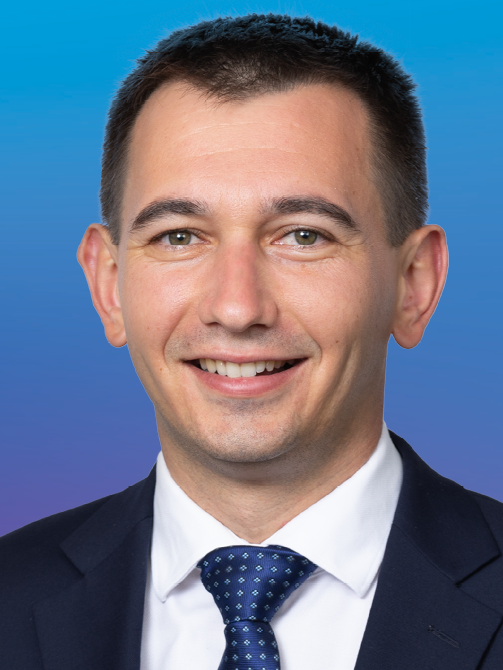
- Incumbent; Simeon Brown since 7 April 2026
- New Zealand Electricity Authority; Energy Efficiency and Conservation Authority
- Style: The Honourable
- Member of: Executive Council
- Reports to: Prime Minister of New Zealand
- Appointer: Governor-General of New Zealand
- Term length: At His Majesty's pleasure
- Formation: 8 December 1972
- First holder: Warren Freer
- Salary: $288,900
- Website: www.beehive.govt.nz

The Minister for Energy is a minister in the New Zealand Government with responsibility for the New Zealand Electricity Authority and Energy Efficiency and Conservation Authority. The current Minister is Simeon Brown.

== List of ministers ==
The following ministers have held the office of Minister of Energy and Resources.

Key

Labour National

No.	Name	Portrait	Term of Office		Prime Minister
As Minister of Energy and Resources
1	Warren Freer		8 December 1972	12 December 1975	Kirk
1	Warren Freer		8 December 1972	12 December 1975	Rowling
2	Eric Holland		12 December 1975	8 March 1977	Muldoon
3	George Gair		8 March 1977	13 December 1978	Muldoon
4	Bill Birch		13 December 1978	26 July 1984	Muldoon
5	Bob Tizard		26 July 1984	16 September 1987	Lange
6	David Butcher		16 September 1987	2 November 1990	Lange
6	David Butcher		16 September 1987	2 November 1990	Palmer
6	David Butcher		16 September 1987	2 November 1990	Moore
7	John Luxton		2 November 1990	2 March 1994	Bolger
8	Doug Kidd		2 March 1994	16 December 1996	Bolger
9	Max Bradford		16 December 1996	10 December 1999	Bolger
9	Max Bradford		16 December 1996	10 December 1999	Shipley
10	Pete Hodgson		10 December 1999	21 December 2004	Clark
11	Trevor Mallard		21 December 2004	19 October 2005	Clark
12	David Parker		19 October 2005	21 March 2006	Clark
(11)	Trevor Mallard; Acting Minister		21 March 2006	3 May 2006	Clark
(12)	David Parker		3 May 2006	19 November 2008	Clark
13	Gerry Brownlee		19 November 2008	14 December 2011	Key
14	Phil Heatley		14 December 2011	29 January 2013	Key
15	Simon Bridges		29 January 2013	20 December 2016	Key
16	Judith Collins		20 December 2016	26 October 2017	English
17	Megan Woods		26 October 2017	27 November 2023	Ardern
17	Megan Woods		26 October 2017	27 November 2023	Hipkins
As Minister for Energy
18	Simeon Brown		27 November 2023	24 January 2025	Luxon
19	Simon Watts		24 January 2025	7 April 2026	Luxon
(18)	Simeon Brown		7 April 2026	present	Luxon

== See also ==
- Energy in New Zealand
- Energy law
