= Association of Salaried Medical Specialists =

New Zealand trade union

ASMS
- Association of Salaried Medical Specialists
- Founded: 1989
- Headquarters: Wellington, New Zealand
- Location: New Zealand
- Members: 5141
- Key people: Julian Vyas, President, Andrew Ewans, Vice President Executive Director Sarah Dalton (2020- )
- Affiliations: NZCTU
- Website: www.asms.org.nz

The Association of Salaried Medical Specialists (ASMS) is a trade union in New Zealand that represents the professional and industrial interests of just over 5000 senior salaried doctors and dentists employed by public hospitals and other employers of health care professionals, including the Family Planning Association, ACC, hospices, community trusts, Iwi health authorities, union health centres and the New Zealand Blood Service.

The ASMS is an affiliate of the New Zealand Council of Trade Unions.

The objectives of the ASMS are to:

- promote the right of equal access for all New Zealanders to high quality health services
- articulate members’ professional concerns and interests to the Government
- contribute to public debate and discussion about the provision of health services in New Zealand
- advise and represents members on matters related to their employment agreements
- negotiates collective employment agreements
- support workplace empowerment and clinical leadership
