= Wayne Mapp =

New Zealand politician

The Honourable Wayne Mapp QSO
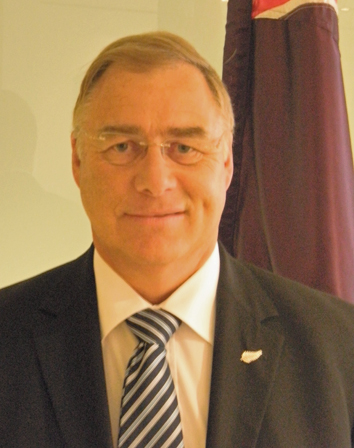
- Wayne Mapp at his office in Wellington in February 2010

36th Minister of Defence
- In office 19 November 2008 – 30 November 2011
- Prime Minister: John Key
- Preceded by: Phil Goff
- Succeeded by: Jonathan Coleman

23rd Minister of Research, Science and Technology
- In office 19 November 2008 – 30 November 2011
- Prime Minister: John Key
- Preceded by: Pete Hodgson
- Succeeded by: Steven Joyce

Member of the New Zealand Parliament for North Shore
- In office 12 October 1996 – 30 November 2011
- Preceded by: Bruce Cliffe
- Succeeded by: Maggie Barry

Personal details
- Born: Wayne Daniel Mapp; 12 March 1952 (age 74) Te Kōpuru, Northland, New Zealand
- Party: National Party
- Other political affiliations: Labour (past)
- Spouse: Denese Henare
- Occupation: Lawyer
- Website: http://www.waynemapp.co.nz/

Wayne Daniel Mapp QSO (born 12 March 1952) is a former New Zealand National Party politician. He was the Member of Parliament for North Shore from 1996 to 2011. In the first term of the Fifth National Government, he served as Minister of Defence. Prior to his political career Mapp was in the New Zealand Territorial Army and worked as a lawyer and university lecturer.

== Early years ==
He gained his LLB (Hon) at University of Auckland. This was followed by his LLM from University of Toronto and his PhD in International Law from Christ's College, Cambridge in 1988.

He served as an infantry Major in 3rd Auckland (Countess of Ranfurly's Own) and Northland Regiment Royal New Zealand Territorial Army, later specialising in military intelligence.

Mapp was initially a member of the Labour Party and in 1981 he put himself forward for the Labour candidacy for the Roskill electorate. One of 14 contenders he lost out to Phil Goff.

Before entering politics, Mapp practised law and was an associate professor in commercial law at the University of Auckland.

== Member of Parliament ==
New Zealand Parliament
Years	Term	Electorate	List	Party
1996–1999	45th	North Shore	58	National
1999–2002	46th	North Shore	33	National
2002–2005	47th	North Shore	7	National
2005–2008	48th	North Shore	14	National
2008–2011	49th	North Shore	13	National

Mapp was elected MP for the North Shore seat at the 1996 general election. He was re-elected in that electorate four more times until he retired from Parliament at the 2011 general election.

=== Early political career ===
In Mapp's first term, the National Party formed a coalition government with New Zealand First and Mapp was appointed to the Justice and Foreign Affairs select committees. After the 1999 election, National spent nine years in Opposition. Mapp held various party spokesperson roles including Defence, Justice, Foreign Affairs, Industrial Relations and "political correctness eradication."

In a September 2003 house sitting, Mapp criticised the incumbent government's lack of support for the US-led invasion of Iraq. His comment pertained to New Zealand being "missing in action" in Iraq, John Key echoed support for his statements and this was used in Labour's election advertising in the 2008 New Zealand general election.

=== Fifth National Government ===
Following National's victory in the 2008 general election, Mapp was appointed Minister of Defence, Minister of Research, Science and Technology (later titled Minister of Science and Innovation), Associate Minister for Economic Development and Associate Minister for Tertiary Education.

While Minister of Defence, Mapp oversaw Operation Burnham, a joint military operation undertaken in Afghanistan by the New Zealand Special Air Service with elements of the Afghan Crisis Response Unit and International Security Assistance Force in October 2010. The 2017 book by Nicky Hager and Jon Stephenson, Hit & Run, alleged that New Zealand forces had committed war crimes against civilians in the Naik and Khak Khudday Dad villages. Mapp announced that he had been a source for the book. In 2020, a Government Inquiry found that a child had been killed in Operation Burnham but that the military operation was justified under international law.

On 15 December 2010, Mapp announced he would retire from Parliament at the 2011 general election.

== Post-Parliament ==
On 15 December 2011, in recognition of his term as a Member of the Executive Council of New Zealand, Mapp was granted the right to retain the title The Honourable for the rest of his life.

On 28 February 2012, Mapp was appointed to the New Zealand Law Commission.

In the 2013 New Year Honours, Mapp was appointed a Companion of the Queen's Service Order for services as a member of Parliament.

Political offices
Preceded by Phil Goff	Minister of Defence; 2008–2011	Succeeded by Jonathan Coleman
Preceded by Pete Hodgson	Minister of Research, Science and Technology; 2008–2011	Succeeded by Steven Joyce
New Zealand Parliament
Preceded by Bruce Cliffe	Member of Parliament for North Shore; 1996–2011	Succeeded by Maggie Barry
