= Electoral Reform Coalition =

- Patrons: Jack Marshall (1986–1988); Sir Charles Bennett (1986–?); Angela Foulkes (1986–?); Mike Minogue (1988–?)
- Key people: Rod Donald (National Spokesman 1989–1993); Phil Saxby (Secretary)
- Founded: 1986
- Headquarters: New Zealand
- Ideology: Electoral Reform in New Zealand

Website
- Campaign for MMP

The Electoral Reform Coalition (ERC) is a group advocating electoral reform in New Zealand. It was founded in 1986. The group has been reformed as the Campaign for MMP to fight to retain Mixed-member proportional representation at the 2011 referendum on the issue.

== History ==
The Electoral Reform Coalition was formed in June 1986 to campaign for proportional representation, taking up the goal of a referendum on New Zealand's electoral system in March 1987. It was founded by Roy Middleton, Louis Ehrler and Phil Saxby, who was at the time Chair of the Electorate Committee for Labour MP John Terris. The ERC was formed before the publication of the Report of the Royal Commission on the Electoral System in 1986. The report recommended (amongst other things) that a referendum be held on changing the voting system from First Past the Post to Mixed Member Proportional representation. It was so-called because it consisted of a number of groups in favour of electoral reform, including the Women's Electoral Lobby, Council of Trade Unions, Public Servants Association, National, Labour, Greens, Social Credit and Socialist Unity Party. Both Social Credit and the Values Party (later the Greens) had won significant percentages of votes as a party at general elections, (For example, Social Credit won 20% of votes at the 1981 general election, but only 2 seats) but had won few seats.

In January 1987 the ERC hosted John Taplin of the Proportional Representation Society of Australia to New Zealand, leading to the establishment of several ERC branches around the country. In a leaders debate during the 1987 general election campaign, then Prime Minister David Lange promised a binding referendum on electoral reform. Lange was subsequently forced to back down on the promise. The Justice and Electoral Select Committee produced a report critical of MMP, supporting a Supplementary Member system instead. Lange's successor Geoffrey Palmer stated that proportional representation was "dead" but could be re-visited in "20 years or so".

As a result, the ERC put its efforts into gaining support for a referendum on the electoral system. In the lead up to the 1990 general election, both major party leaders - Mike Moore and Jim Bolger - promised a referendum before the next general election on the issue. Following the election of Bolger as Prime Minister, the new government agreed to begin work on an electoral referendum. They put forward a system of dual referendums, one non-binding with two questions (whether to change the electoral system, and if so which system should be used), and a second between the FPP and the highest ranking system.

=== Electoral reform referendum ===
The non-binding referendum on electoral reform was held on 19 September 1992, to coincide with local body elections. MMP easily won in the vote, with 84% overall wanting a change in electoral system, and 70% backing MMP. However, turn out for this indicative vote was just over 50% of the voting public. Nonetheless, the government drew up the Electoral Act 1993 to replace the previous 1956 legislation, and hold a binding referendum on the electoral system. This was to be held at the same time as the 1993 general election.

The ERC then began working towards the referendum on MMP. A group opposed to MMP was also formed. The Coalition for Better Government (CBG) led by Peter Shirtcliffe, former Chairman of Telecom New Zealand, was formed in April 1993. The CBG allegedly spent $1.13 million on their campaign (no accounts of its spending on the campaign were ever published), while the ERC spent $181,000. Ultimately, the ERC and MMP prevailed, gaining 53.4% of votes cast at the referendum. A recent (November 2008) poll by Research New Zealand found a majority of support for MMP (53%), with 35% supporting FPP, following the 2008 general election, the fifth under MMP.

Volunteers in the campaign included future Labour MP Dianne Yates, and future NZ First MP Deborah Morris.

=== Local Government electoral reform ===
From 1994 the ERC began to focus on local government electoral reform. The ERC campaigned for Single Transferable Vote in Wellington, and for its retention at a 2008 referendum.

== Chairpersons ==
Chairs of the ERC:

- David Shields - 1986–1987
- David Round - 1987–1988
- Bridgette Hicks-Willer - 1988–1990
- Lowell Manning - 1990–1991
- Colin Clark - 1991–1994
