= Term of Parliament (Enabling 4-year Term) Legislation Amendment Bill =

Proposed New Zealand legislation

New Zealand Parliament
- Citation: Term of Parliament (Enabling 4-year Term) Legislation Amendment Bill (NZ).
- Territorial extent: New Zealand

Legislative history
- Introduced by: Paul Goldsmith
- Committee responsible: Justice Select Committee
- First reading: 5 March 2025
- Voting summary: 117 voted for; 6 voted against
- Status: Pending — before

The Term of Parliament (Enabling 4-year Term) Legislation Amendment Bill, also known as the 4-year Term Bill, is a government bill in the New Zealand Parliament proposing that future Parliaments can meet for up to four years if certain conditions are met.

Following a decision by the Government in February 2026 not to advance the bill during the current parliamentary term, consideration of the proposal was deferred unless re-elected, and plans for a referendum on extending the parliamentary term to four years in the 2026 general election were abandoned.

== Background ==
New Zealand has a unicameral legislature (the New Zealand House of Representatives) usually comprising 120 members who are elected in general elections every three years. The term of Parliament is set under section 17 of the Constitution Act 1986 as being no longer than three years. The three-year term is uncommon internationally for a lower house. Previous attempts to extend the term of Parliament to four years have been unsuccessful, with referendums proposing a longer term being defeated in 1967 and 1990. Section 17 is considered "entrenched legislation" and can only be amended if 75 per cent of the House agrees or if a simple majority of voters agree in a nationwide referendum.

In the 52nd New Zealand Parliament, ACT New Zealand leader David Seymour proposed a private member's bill that would enable Parliament to meet for four years if Opposition parties, rather than Government parties as is convention, controlled the select committees of the House of Representatives. When ACT formed a coalition government with the National Party and New Zealand First Party, the three parties agreed to support Seymour's member's bill as far as select committee.

== Legislation ==
The Term of Parliament (Enabling 4-year Term) Legislation Amendment Bill amends the Constitution Act 1986 and the Electoral Act 1993. The bill is designed so it only comes into force if a majority of voters support it in a referendum on the question: "Which option do you vote for?" The following options are: "I vote to keep the maximum term of Parliament at 3 years." and "I vote to change the maximum term of Parliament to 4 years". The bill, once enacted, is expected to come into force on the day of the issue of the writ for the 2026 New Zealand general election. It will be repealed if a majority of electors vote to preserve the three-year parliamentary term or no referendum on the matter is held within the next two general elections.

In the event that a majority of electors vote to extend the parliamentary term from three to four years, the bill amends the Constitution Act 1986 and the Electoral Act 1993 to extend the parliamentary term from three to four years. The amendments to the Electoral Act allow for elections to be held at the conclusion of a four-year term and entrench the amendments to the Constitution Act.

== Legislative history ==
=== First reading ===
The bill was introduced on 27 February 2025 in the name of Paul Goldsmith, the Minister of Justice. It was read a first time on 5 March 2025. It received support from all parties, except Te Pāti Māori. Government documents were released prior to the first reading showing that officials had reservations about the proposal for a variable length term of Parliament, describing it as "much worse than the status quo" and "constitutionally and practically problematic."

Votes at first reading (5 March 2025)
Party	Voted for	Voted against
National	49	0
Labour	34	0
Green	15	0
ACT	11	0
NZ First	8	0
Te Pāti Māori	0	6
Totals	117	6

=== Select committee ===
On 25 August 2025, the Parliamentary select committee released its report on the proposed four-year term legislation. The committee recommended moving ahead with a four-year term following a referendum but rejected ACT's proposal for an optional four-year team based on the Government handing over control of select committees to opposition parties. In the event that arrangement was not met, Parliament would have reverted to a three-year term. ACT was the only party to support this arrangement in its minority view. The select committee also unanimously adopted a report establishing the legislative framework for holding a referendum on extending the parliamentary term from three to four years.

On 18 February 2026, Justice Minister Paul Goldsmith confirmed that the Government would not progress with the second reading of the bill during the 54th New Zealand Parliamentary term, saying that it was not a priority for the Government in the "justice area." Goldsmith indicated that the Government would consider progressing the bill if re-elected for a second term. Consequently, plans to hold a referendum on extending the parliamentary term from three to four years during the 2026 New Zealand general election were scrapped.

== Responses ==
On 14 February 2025, Local Government New Zealand (LGNZ), the representative body for local government bodies in New Zealand, voiced support for extending both the parliamentary and local government terms from three to four years. LGNZ's President and Mayor of Selwyn Sam Broughton however disagreed with ACT's proposal to make the four-year parliamentary term optional, also saying that such an arrangement could cause years in which both local and general elections were held simultaneously. Broughton also urged the central government to pass legislation extending the local government term from three to four years, saying that it could serve as "a test case to show New Zealanders that we could get better outcomes at cheaper costs."

On 29 October 2025, the policy think tank New Zealand Initiative expressed support for raising the parliamentary term from three to four years among other reforms including raising the number of MPs from 120 to 170, reducing the number of Cabinet members and abolishing overhang seats.

== Public opinion ==
A December 2024 Horizon Research poll found that the public were 40% in favour, 30% opposed, and 30% unsure regarding extending the parliamentary term to four years.

== See also ==
- Constitution of New Zealand
- Elections in New Zealand
