= Electoral system of New Zealand =

System by which New Zealand parliament is elected

The New Zealand parliamentary electoral system has been based on the principle of mixed-member proportional (MMP) since the 1996 election. MMP was introduced following a referendum in 1993. It replaced the first-past-the-post (FPP) system New Zealand had previously used for most of its history. Under the MMP system, New Zealanders have two secret ballot votes to elect members of Parliament (MPs). The first vote is for a candidate from an electorate, a geographic electoral district. The second is the party vote for the political party the voter wants to form the government.

The timing of elections is governed by the Constitution Act 1986 and political conventions. Generally, parliamentary general elections are held approximately every three years and are conducted by the independent Electoral Commission.

New Zealand's Parliament has a single house, the House of Representatives, usually with 120 MPs, although the number can increase due to a small number of overhang seats, depending on the outcome of the electoral process. The total number of MPs a party has in a term of parliament is in principle determined by its share of the party vote. The 54th Parliament, elected in 2023, comprises 123 seats: 72 were filled by electorate MPs (Note: including an MP elected in a by-election held shortly after the general election) and the remaining seats filled by list MPs selected from ranked party lists.

In 1893, New Zealand was the first self-governing country to grant women the right to vote. This meant that, theoretically, New Zealand had universal suffrage from 1893, meaning all adults 21 years of age and older were allowed to vote (in 1969 the voting age was lowered from 21 to 20. It was lowered further to 18 in 1974). However, the voting rules that applied to the European settlers did not apply to Māori, and their situation is still unique in that seven seats in Parliament are elected by Māori voters alone.

In contemporary New Zealand, generally all permanent residents and citizens aged 18 or older are eligible to vote. The main exceptions include citizens who have lived overseas continuously for too long, and convicted persons who are detained in a psychiatric hospital or serving a prison term of more than three years.

== Term of parliament ==
Although parliamentary elections are held at least every three years, this has not always been the case. In New Zealand's early colonial history, the parliamentary term could last up to five years – as established by the New Zealand Constitution Act 1852. The term was reduced to three years in 1879 because of concerns about the growing power of central government.

Since then, the term has been altered three times. During the First World War it was extended to five years. In the early 1930s, during the Great Depression, it was pushed out to four years. This proved to be unpopular with the electorate and after the election of 1935, the term was reduced to three years again. It was extended to four years once again during the Second World War, but returned to three years afterwards. In 1956, the term of three years was 'entrenched' in the Electoral Act which means that it can only be changed by achieving a majority in a national referendum or by a vote of 75% of all members of Parliament.

In 2013 the Government established an advisory panel to conduct a review of constitutional issues – including an examination of the term of parliament. Other issues discussed at public meetings held by the panel were the number of MPs New Zealand should have, whether a written constitution is needed, and whether all legislation should be consistent with the Bill of Rights Act. Both Prime Minister John Key and Opposition leader David Shearer expressed support for an extension of the parliamentary term to four years. The main argument put forward in support of a longer term is that "Governments need time to establish and then implement new policies".

In the 1967 New Zealand parliamentary term referendum, 68% of the votes were opposed to extending the term. The 1990 New Zealand parliamentary term referendum found 69% of the voters were opposed to extending the term.

In 2013, an opinion poll on the news website Stuff found that of 3,882 respondents, 61% were in favour of changing to a four-year term.

A 2020 poll found that 61% of respondents supported changing to a four-year term and 25% were against it. The rest were undecided.

== Māori seats ==
A unique feature of New Zealand's electoral system is that a number of seats in Parliament are reserved exclusively for Māori. However, this was not always the case. In the early colonial era, Māori could not vote in elections unless they owned land as individuals. European colonists were quite happy with this state of affairs because, according to NZ History online, "they did not think Māori were yet 'civilised' enough to exercise such an important responsibility". At the time, Māori were dealing directly with the Crown in regard to the Treaty of Waitangi and had little interest in the 'pākehā parliament'.

During the wars of the 1860s, some settlers began to realise it was necessary to bring Māori into the British system if the two sides were to get along. After much debate, in 1867 Parliament passed the Maori Representation Act, which established four electorates solely for Māori. The four Māori seats were a very minor concession; the settlers had 72 seats at the time and, on a per capita basis, Māori should have got up to 16 seats. All Māori men (but not women) over the age of 21 were given the right to vote and to stand for Parliament.

Full-blooded Māori had to vote in the Māori seats and only Māori with mixed parentage ('half-castes') were allowed to choose whether they voted in European electorates or Māori electorates. Some voters having the choice between the two voting systems (settler seats versus Māori seats) continued until 1975.

From time to time there was public discussion about whether New Zealand still needed separate representation for Māori – which some politicians described as a form of apartheid. Māori were only allowed to stand for election in European seats (or general electorates) from 1967.

In 1985, a Royal Commission on the Electoral System was established. It concluded that "separate seats had not helped Maori and that they would achieve better representation through a proportional party-list system". The commission recommended that if a mixed-member proportional (MMP) system was adopted, the Māori seats should be abolished. However, most Māori wanted to keep them and the seats were not only retained under MMP, their "number would now increase or decrease according to the results (population numbers) of the regular Māori electoral option". As a result, in 1996 before the first MMP election, the number of Māori seats increased to five – the first increase in 129 years. In 2002, it went up to seven.

== Developments in voting rights and eligibility ==
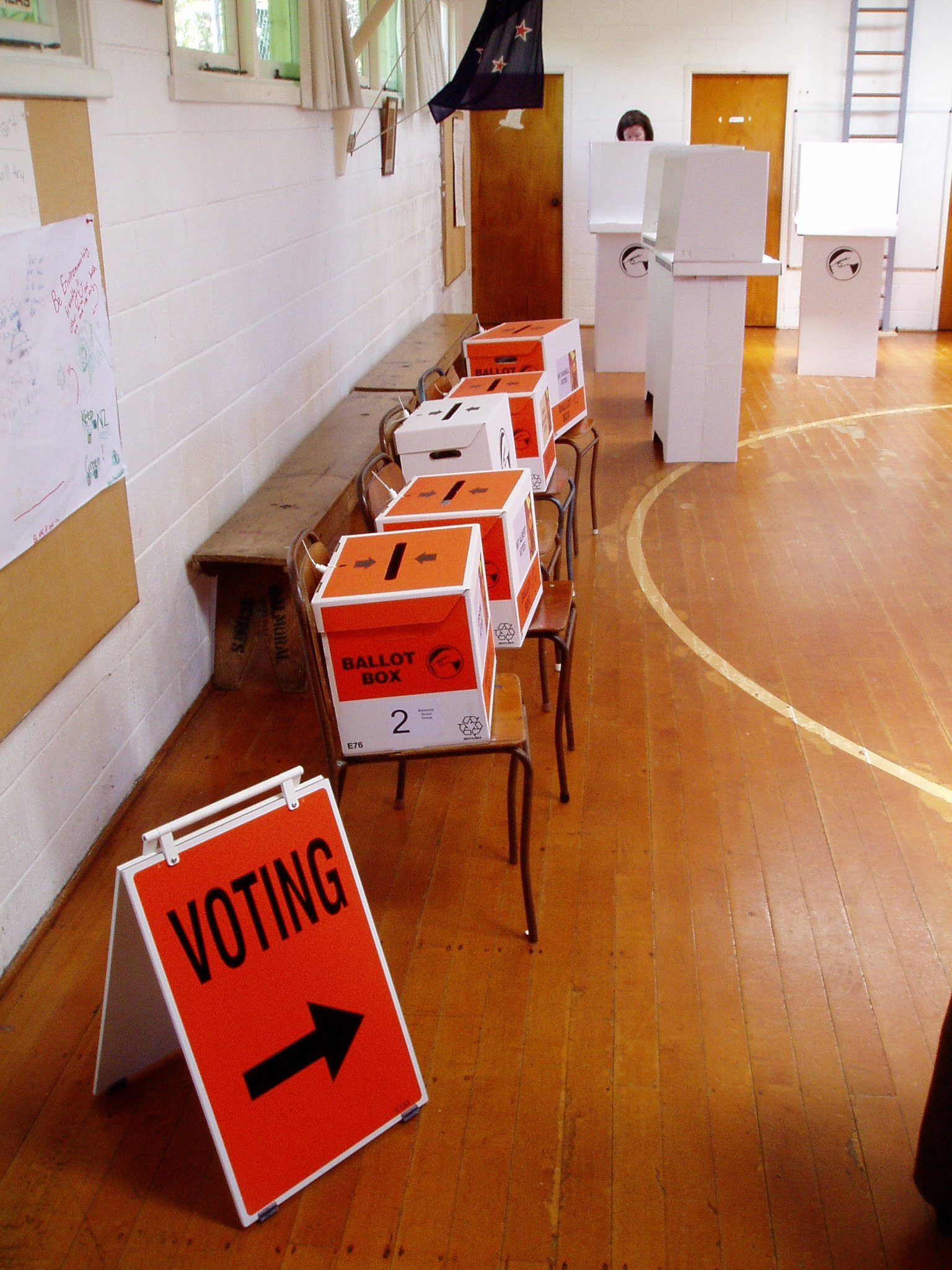
Ballot boxes and voting booths at a voting place

=== Secret ballot ===
In European seats, the secret ballot was introduced in 1870. However, Māori continued to use a verbal system – whereby electors had to tell the polling official which candidate they wanted to vote for. Māori were not allowed a secret ballot until 1938 and even voted on a different day. According to NZ History online: "Up until 1951 Maori voted on a different day from Europeans, often several weeks later." It was not until 1951 that voting in the four Māori electorates was held on the same day as voting in the general election.

NZ History also states: "There were also no electoral rolls for the Maori seats. Electoral officials had always argued that it would be too difficult to register Maori voters (supposedly because of difficulties with language, literacy and proof of identity). Despite frequent allegations of electoral irregularities in the Maori seats, rolls were not used until the 1949 election."

Today, voters cast their secret ballot at voting places or via postal vote. Special votes are cast by electors whose names are not on the printed electoral rolls held in that voting place (for example, if they were voting outside of their normal electorate, their enrolment had lapsed because they had moved without updating their details, or they were on the unpublished roll).

=== Māori representation ===
Māori representation by four Māori members was introduced in 1868, see First Māori elections. Most Māori land was held collectively, so most Māori did not meet the property qualification for voting.

=== Universal male suffrage ===
Universal manhood suffrage was introduced in the 1881 New Zealand general election, following a law change in 1879. Previously there had been a property qualification for voting, and this was often listed in earlier electoral rolls.

Special electorates for gold miners in the South Island for which the only qualification was holding a mining licence, the Gold Fields electorate and the Gold Field Towns electorate took part in the 1866. They existed between 1862 and 1870.

=== Women's suffrage ===
In early colonial New Zealand, as in most Western countries, women were totally excluded from political affairs. Led by Kate Sheppard, a women's suffrage movement began in New Zealand in the late 19th century, and the legislative council finally passed a bill allowing women to vote in 1893. This made New Zealand the first country in the world to give women the vote. However, they were not allowed to stand as candidates until 1919, and the first female Member of Parliament (Elizabeth McCombs) was not elected until 1933 – 40 years later. Although there have been three female prime ministers (Jenny Shipley, Helen Clark and Jacinda Ardern), women remain somewhat under-represented in Parliament. Following the election in 2011, 39 MPs (almost one third) were women. After the 2011 election, on a global ranking New Zealand is 21st in terms of its representation of women in Parliament.

=== Prisoners' right to vote ===
The voting rights of prisoners in New Zealand have been in a near constant state of flux since the earliest elections – currently prisoners serving terms longer than three years cannot vote.

In 2010, the National government passed the Electoral (Disqualification of Convicted Prisoners) Amendment Bill which removed the right of all sentenced prisoners to vote (regardless of the length of sentence imposed). The Attorney-General stated that the new law was inconsistent with the Bill of Rights Act, which says that "every New Zealand citizen who is over the age of 18 years has the right to vote and stand in genuine periodic elections of members of the House of Representatives". The Electoral Disqualification Bill was also opposed by the Law Society and the Human Rights Commission who pointed out that, in addition to being inconsistent with the Bill of Rights, the legislation was also incompatible with various international treaties that New Zealand is party to.

Law Society Human Rights committee member Jonathan Temm, in a written submission, told Parliament's law and order committee that: "It is critical for the function of our democracy that we do not interfere with the right to vote." With specific reference to decisions made by courts in Canada, Australia and South Africa, and by the European Court of Human Rights in respect of the United Kingdom, he pointed out that "every comparable overseas jurisdiction has had a blanket ban (against prisoners' voting) struck down in the last 10 years".

In 2020, the Electoral Act was amended so that only persons serving a sentence of imprisonment for a term of three years or more are disenfranchised – this restores the law to the position prior to 2010.

== Election day ==
Until the 1938 election, elections were held on a weekday. In 1938 and in 1943, elections were held on a Saturday. In 1946 and 1949, elections were held on a Wednesday. In 1950, the legal requirement to hold elections on a Saturday was introduced, and this first applied to the 1951 election. Beginning with the 1957 election, a convention was formed to hold general elections on the last Saturday of November. This convention was upset by Robert Muldoon calling a snap election, which was held on Saturday 14 July 1984. The next year an election could have been held on the last Saturday of November would have been 1996, except the day for that election was brought forward slightly to avoid the need for a by-election after Hawkes' Bay MP Michael Laws resigned in April that year (by-elections are not required if a general election is to take place within six months of the vacancy). Since then, only the 1999 election and 2011 election have been held on the traditional day.

In the twenty-first century, a new convention seems to have arisen: since the 2005 election, all elections except three have been held on the second-last Saturday of September. The exceptions were in 2011, which was held in November to avoid clashing with fixtures of the New Zealand-hosted Rugby World Cup, in 2020, which was delayed from the second-last Saturday of September due to the COVID-19 pandemic, in 2023, and in 2026.

Prior to 1951, elections in Māori electorates were held on different days than elections in general electorates. The table below shows election dates starting with the first election that was held on a Saturday in 1938:

Key

Election held on last Saturday of November
Election held on second-last Saturday of September

Parliament	general election	notes
26th	15 October 1938	First election held on a Saturday; Māori election held the previous day
27th	25 September 1943	General election on a Saturday; Māori election held the previous day
28th	27 November 1946	General election on a Wednesday; Māori election held the previous day
29th	30 November 1949	General election on a Wednesday; Māori election held the previous day
30th	1 September 1951	Snap election due to waterfront strike; general and Māori election legislated to be held on a Saturday from now on
31st	13 November 1954	
32nd	30 November 1957	
33rd	26 November 1960	
34th	30 November 1963	
35th	26 November 1966	
36th	29 November 1969	
37th	25 November 1972	
38th	29 November 1975	
39th	25 November 1978	
40th	28 November 1981	
41st	14 July 1984	Muldoon's snap election
42nd	15 August 1987	
43rd	27 October 1990	
44th	6 November 1993	
45th	12 October 1996	Called early to circumvent a by-election in Hawkes Bay
46th	27 November 1999	
47th	27 July 2002	Clark's early election
48th	17 September 2005	
49th	8 November 2008	
50th	26 November 2011	First election where date announced at beginning of the year.
51st	20 September 2014	
52nd	23 September 2017	
53rd	17 October 2020	Postponed to this date from 19 September 2020, due to the COVID-19 pandemic
54th	14 October 2023	
55th	7 November 2026	

Advance voting is also available in the two weeks before election day; voters can visit voting places during this period. In the 2020 election, 57% of voters cast an advanced vote.

== Mixed-member proportional (MMP) representation ==
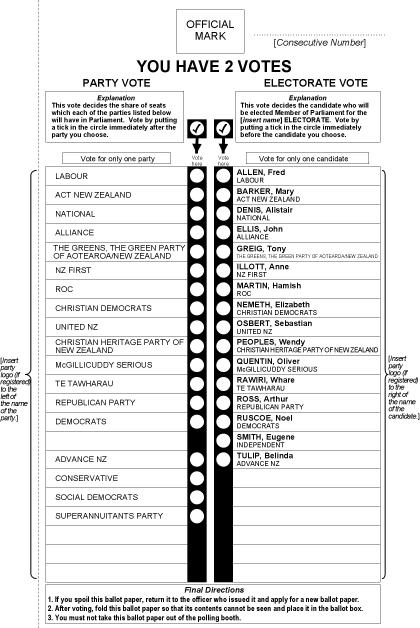
A sample MMP ballot paper

Until 1994, New Zealand used the first-past-the-post (FPP) electoral system, whereby the candidate who received the most votes in each single-member constituency was elected from that constituency. This system favoured the two-party dominance of the National Party and the Labour Party. Smaller parties found it hard to gain representation; for example, despite gaining 16% of the vote in 1978 and 21% in 1981, the New Zealand Social Credit Party won only one and two seats, respectively.

Spurred by public disillusionment in the political system, Labour campaigned in 1981 and 1984 on a promise to establish a Royal Commission into the electoral system. Following their election into government in 1984, Labour established the Royal Commission on the Electoral System, and the commission's 1986 report recommended the adoption of mixed-member proportional representation (MMP). After the government sidelining the issue for years, the Bolger National government responded to public pressure by holding an indicative referendum on the electoral system in 1992. With a turnout of 55 percent, an overwhelming majority of 85 percent voted for change, and 70 percent preferred MMP. A second, binding referendum was held in 1993 asking voters to choose between FPP and MMP; with a turnout of 85 percent, MMP won the vote by 54 to 46 percent.

In 1994, Parliament officially adopted an MMP electoral system. Its defining characteristic is a mix of members of Parliament (MPs) from single-seat electorates and MPs elected from a party list, with each party's share of seats determined by its share of the party vote nationwide. The first MMP election was held in 1996. As a result, National and Labour usually lost their complete dominance in the House. Neither party would again have a majority of seats, and run a majority government, until the 2020 election saw Labour winning 65 of the 120 seats.

Under MMP, New Zealand voters have two votes. The first vote is the electorate vote. A plurality of the district's votes elects the local representative for that electorate (geographic electoral district). (See also: Electoral boundaries). The electorate seat is filled through the plurality system whereby whichever candidate gets the greatest number of votes in each electorate wins the seat.

The second vote is the party vote. The party votes cast across the country are pooled. In conjunction with the electoral thresholds, the party votes are used to determine the number of seats each party is entitled to overall – in other words, to produce a proportional House. When a party is due more seats than the number of electorate seats it has won, it is awarded leveling seats as possible.

There are two thresholds in the New Zealand MMP system:

1. Any party which receives 5% or more of the party vote (the electoral threshold) is entitled to a share of the nominally 120 seats in the House of Representatives even if the party does not win an electorate seat. For instance, in the 2008 election, the Green Party failed to win any electorate seats, but won 6.7% of the party vote and so earned nine seats in Parliament.
2. Any party that wins one or more electorate seats (the electorate threshold) is entitled to a share of the nominally 120 seats in the House of Representatives, based on the percentage of the party vote, even if it does not win at least 5% of the party vote. In 2008, the ACT Party won only 3.6% of the party vote, but ACT got a total of five seats in the House because an ACT candidate won the Epsom electorate; this has been called the "coat-tailing" rule.

Seats in parliament are allocated to electorate MPs first, and then parties fulfil their remaining quota (based on their share of the party vote) from their list members. A closed list is used, and list seats are allocated by the Sainte-Laguë method, which is unbiased and does not favour larger parties like the alternative D'Hondt method. If a party has more electoral district seats than it is entitled to based on the proportional party vote, then it receives overhang seats. A party is allowed to keep any overhang seats it wins and the other parties are not awarded compensation seats. This first occurred following the 2005 general election, when the Māori Party won 4 electorates, despite its overall party vote (2.1%) only entitling it to 3 seats; thus, it received one overhang seat and the 48th Parliament subsequently consisted of 121 MPs.

Only parties registered with the Electoral Commission can submit party lists; unregistered parties can contest elections but cannot provide party lists. Not all registered parties submit a party list. Reasons for this may vary and include missing the deadline. The following registered parties did not submit party lists:

General election	Party	Source
1996	Republican Party	
1999	Asia Pacific United Party	
1999	Mana Wahine Te Ira Tangata	
1999	Te Tawharau	
2002	Libertarianz	
2005	n/a	
2008	n/a	
2011	n/a	
2014	Alliance	
2014	Internet Party	
2014	Mana Movement	
2017	n/a	
2020	Mana Movement	
2023	Democratic Alliance	

The 2014 case of the Internet Party and the Mana Movement not submitting lists was due to their forming an electoral alliance called Internet MANA. This alliance had to be registered as a separate party, but the individual component parties were not deregistered, and are thus listed as not having submitted a list. Internet Mana was deregistered in December 2014.

=== Strategic voting ===
Strategic (or tactical) voting in New Zealand mainly refers to ticket splitting, where voters give their party vote to Party A and their candidate vote to a candidate from Party B. The two largest parties, National and Labour, have in some instances facilitated this by encouraging their own supporters to vote for the candidates of a smaller party they would like to work with to form a government, especially where the smaller party is not likely to otherwise be represented in Parliament. In addition, candidates of some smaller parties, such as the Green Party, encourage strategic voting in some electorates they consider they are not likely to win by asking only for voters' party votes and not their candidate votes.

Examples where strategic voting was encouraged under MMP include:

- National Party leaders Jim Bolger and John Key indicating to voters in Wellington Central (in 1996) and Epsom (in 2011 and 2014) to vote for the ACT New Zealand candidate rather than the National candidate.
- Labour Party leader Helen Clark endorsing Green Party co-leader Jeanette Fitzsimons for the candidate vote in Coromandel in 1999.
- National Party leader Bill English and National candidate Brett Hudson endorsing Hudson's United Future opponent Peter Dunne in Ōhariu in 2017.

Strategic voting, in the traditional sense of voter voting for a less-preferred candidate or party, may still occur where the voter considers their preferred candidate or party may not pass one of the two thresholds. When smaller parties are widely predicted, through political opinion polling, to surpass the electoral threshold, there may be fewer incentives for strategic voting.

=== 2011 referendum and Electoral Commission 2012 report ===
A referendum on the voting system was held in conjunction with the 2011 general election, with 57.8% of voters voting to keep the existing mixed member proportional (MMP) voting system. Under the Electoral Referendum Act 2010, the majority vote automatically triggered an independent review of the workings of the system by the Electoral Commission.

The commission released a consultation paper in February 2012 calling for public submissions on ways to improve the MMP system, with the focus put on six areas: basis of eligibility for list seats (thresholds), by-election candidates, dual candidacy, order of candidates on party lists, overhang, and proportion of electorate seats to list seats. The commission released its proposal paper for consultation in August 2012, before publishing its final report on 29 October 2012. In the report, the commission recommended the following:

- Reducing the party vote threshold from 5 percent to 4 percent. If the 4 percent threshold is introduced, it should be reviewed after three general elections.
- Abolishing the one electorate seat threshold – a party must cross the party vote threshold to gain list seats.
- Abolishing the provision of overhang seats for parties not reaching the threshold – the extra electorates would be made up at the expense of list seats to retain 120 MPs
- Retaining the status quo for by-election candidacy and dual candidacy.
- Retaining the status quo with closed party lists, but increasing scrutiny in selection of list candidates to ensure parties comply with their own party rules.
- Parliament should give consideration to fixing the ratio between electorate seats and list seats at 60:40 (72:48 in a 120-seat parliament)

Parliament is responsible for implementing any changes to the system, which has been largely unchanged since it was introduced in 1994 for the 1996 election. In November 2012, a private member's bill under the name of opposition Labour Party member Iain Lees-Galloway was put forward to implement the first two recommendations, but the bill was not chosen in the member's bill ballot.

In May 2014, Judith Collins and John Key said that there was no inter-party consensus on implementing the results of the commission, so they would not introduce any legislation.

=== 2024 electoral review ===
In October 2021, the Labour government announced an independent review of New Zealand's electoral law, including aspects of the MMP system. The scope of the review has been set in its terms of reference. It examined:

- the overall design of the legislative framework for the electoral system
- maintaining a fit-for-purpose electoral regime for voters, parties and candidates
- previous recommendations
- the term of Parliament.

The independent panel leading the review was announced in May 2022. The Ministry of Justice published the panel's report on 16 January 2024.

== Electoral boundaries ==
The number of electorates to be represented in Parliament is calculated in three steps. The less-populated of New Zealand's two principal islands, the South Island, has a fixed quota of 16 general electorates. The number of electorates for North Island general electors and Māori electors is calculated so that each electorate across New Zealand has the same number of constituents, within a tolerance of plus or minus 5%. The number of electorates is recalculated, and boundaries redrawn where necessary, after each quinquennial (five-year) New Zealand census.

Since the boundary review following the 2001 census, there have been 7 Māori electorates. The number of general electorates in the North Island is generally increasing due to disproportional population growth between the North and South Islands. Accordingly, the number of North Island electorates has increased from 44 to 49 since 1996. For each additional electorate created, one fewer list seat is available. At the 2023 election there were 65 general electorates and 7 Māori electorates. The next boundary review is expected to take place before the 2026 election.

== Representation statistics ==
The Gallagher Index is a measurement of how closely the proportions of votes cast for each party is reflected in the number of parliamentary seats gained by that party. The resultant disproportionality figure is a percentage – the lower the index, the better the match.

Election	Disproportionality	Number of Parties in Parliament	Effective number of electoral parties	Effective number of parliamentary parties
1946–1993 average	11.10%	2.4	2.53	1.96
1996	3.43%	6	4.39	3.76
1999	2.97%	7	3.86	3.45
2002	2.37%	7	4.16	3.76
2005	1.13%	8	3.04	2.98
2008	3.84%	7	3.07	2.78
2011	2.38%	8	3.15	2.98
2014	3.82%	7	3.27	2.96
2017	2.70%	5	2.91	2.67
2020	4.16%	5	3.04	2.61
2023	2.63%	6	4.10	3.81

== Political parties ==
As of March 2024, there are 19 registered political parties in New Zealand, but many other minor parties have registered and deregistered over time since the introduction of MMP

Party name	Founded	Registered (under MMP)	In parliament
ACT New Zealand	1994	17 February 1995	Yes
Animal Justice Party	2022	16 August 2023	No
Aotearoa Legalise Cannabis Party	1990	30 May 1996	No
Democratic Alliance	2023	28 August 2023	No
Freedoms New Zealand	2022	15 February 2023	No
Leighton Baker Party	2023	16 August 2023	No
New Conservatives	2011	6 October 2011	No
New Nation Party	2022	12 April 2023	No
New Zealand First	1993	20 December 1994	Yes
New Zealand Labour Party	1916	17 February 1995	Yes
New Zealand Loyal	2023	28 August 2023	No
NewZeal	2020	9 July 2020	No
NZ Outdoors & Freedom Party	2015	11 August 2017	No
Te Pāti Māori	2004	9 July 2004	Yes
The Green Party of Aotearoa New Zealand	1990	17 August 1995	Yes
The New Zealand National Party	1936	2 December 1994	Yes
The Opportunities Party (TOP)	2016	6 March 2017	No
Vision NZ	2019	4 December 2019	No
Women's Rights Party	2023	28 August 2023	No

== See also ==
- Electoral Act 1993
- Electoral reform in New Zealand
- Political funding in New Zealand
