= 2011 New Zealand voting system referendum =

- 26 November 2011

Should New Zealand keep the Mixed Member Proportional (MMP) voting system?
Keep the MMP voting system	57.8%
Change to another voting system	42.2%

If New Zealand were to change to another voting system, which voting system would you choose?
First Past the Post	46.7%
Preferential Voting	12.5%
Single Transferable Vote	16.7%
Supplementary Member	24.4%

The 2011 New Zealand voting system referendum was a referendum on whether to keep the existing mixed member proportional (MMP) voting system, or to change to another voting system, for electing Members of Parliament to New Zealand's House of Representatives. It was held on 26 November 2011 in conjunction with the 2011 general election.

The referendum was indicative (non-binding), and asked two questions. The first question asked voters if they wished to keep the existing MMP voting system, or change to a different voting system. The second question asked which alternative voting system the voter would prefer if New Zealand were to change voting system: first past the post, preferential voting, single transferable vote, or supplementary member.

The official results were returned on 10 December 2011, with voters voting by majority to keep the MMP voting system. First-past-the-post received the plurality of the alternative system vote.

== Background ==
=== History ===
New Zealand's electoral system was reformed during the year 1996. A Royal Commission on the Electoral System was established in 1985 by the Fourth Labour Government, after the Labour Party had received more votes, yet won fewer seats than the National Party in both the 1978 and 1981 elections as a result of the existing first-past-the-post (FPP) system. It recommended the adoption of the mixed-member proportional (MMP) voting system.

On 19 September 1992, an indicative referendum was held on whether to keep the existing FPP system or change to a new system, and if the system was changed, which system should replace FPP. By an overwhelming majority, 84.7% voted to change the system, and 70.5% chose MMP as the replacement system.

A second binding referendum was held alongside the 1993 general election on 6 November 1993, asking voters to choose between changing to MMP and keeping the existing FPP system. The final result much closer than in 1992, with MMP winning the referendum 53.9% to 46.1% (1,032,919 votes to 884,964).

The first general election under MMP was in 1996. The 2011 general election was the sixth taken under this system.

=== Current system ===
A New Zealand MMP election gives the voter two votes: one for a party and one for the person they want to represent their electorate. The party votes determine what share of the 120 seats each party gets in Parliament, and the percentage of votes a party gets is ideally proportional to the percentage of seats the party gets. For example, if a party gets 25% of the votes, then they get 25% of the seats (i.e. 30 seats) more or less. A party qualifies for seats only if it passes the electoral threshold – one electorate seat or 5% of the party vote – so the number of seats a party gets may not be fully proportional to the votes (e.g. in 2008, the National Party got 44.93% of the votes and 47.54% of the seats; and while ACT got 3.65% of the votes and 5 seats, New Zealand First got 4.07% of the votes but no seats as they did not win an electorate seat).

Seventy electorate MPs are elected, one from each of the 70 electorates across New Zealand, using first past the post (one vote; highest number of votes wins). These MPs fill their party's share of the seats first. A party may win more electorates than seats it is entitled proportionally, resulting in one or more overhang seats and increasing the size of Parliament, as happened with the Māori Party in 2005 and 2008. Any seats vacant after a party has allocated its electorate seats are filled by MPs from the party's list.

=== Referendum planning ===
During the 2008 general election campaign, the National Party promised that if elected to Government it would hold a referendum on the voting system no later than 2011. National was of the view that it was time for the voting public to review the way they elected representatives. All the major political parties agreed with holding a referendum, although the Labour Party and the Green Party criticised the lack of an independent review of MMP before the referendum. They were of the view that National had a hidden agenda to replace the proportional MMP system with the semi-proportional Supplementary Member (SM) system, which has been described by Labour Christchurch East MP Lianne Dalziel and Green co-leader Metiria Turei as "first-past-the-post in drag". In the referendum legislation it was announced by Amy Adams, MP for Selwyn and Chair of the Electoral Legislation Committee, that she did not believe the National Party would campaign in the referendum and instead suggested that "The whole purpose of this bill is for New Zealanders to make that decision" and this view has been reaffirmed so far at National Party regional conferences.

On 20 October 2009, Justice Minister Simon Power announced that a referendum on the voting system would be held alongside the 2011 general election.

=== Enabling legislation ===
The Electoral Referendum Bill to legislate the referendum was introduced to Parliament on 25 March 2010, and passed all three readings unanimously. The bill received its Royal Assent and became the Electoral Referendum Act 2010 (Public Act 2010 No 139) on 20 December 2010.

In the original version of the bill, there was no advertising spending limits. At the Select Committee stage, a $12,000 spending limit for unregistered promoters and a $300,000 spending limit for registered promoters was added in response to public consultation to "level the playing field", to "protect the integrity" of what is a constitutionally significant referendum, and to prevent wealthy individuals from influencing the outcome. This largely came from the original 1993 referendum legislation not having spending limits, allowing the anti-MMP Campaign for Better Government (CBG), which was backed by a large business lobby, to spend an estimated $1.5 million in advertising compared to the pro-MMP Electoral Reform Coalition's $300,000. The limits were also designed to match the new spending limits by third parties in general elections, which were introduced by the Electoral (Finance Reform and Advance Voting) Amendment Act 2010 that commenced at the same time as the Electoral Referendum Act on 1 January 2011.

Other amendments were proposed at Select Committee and Committee of the House but were not passed. The ACT Party proposed including a third question on whether to retain or remove the separate Maori seats (rejected due to a clause in the confidence and supply agreement between the National and Maori parties) and to increase the registered promoter spending limit to $500,000 or $750,000. The Labour and Green parties proposed holding the review of the MMP system regardless of the referendum results.

== Referendum ==
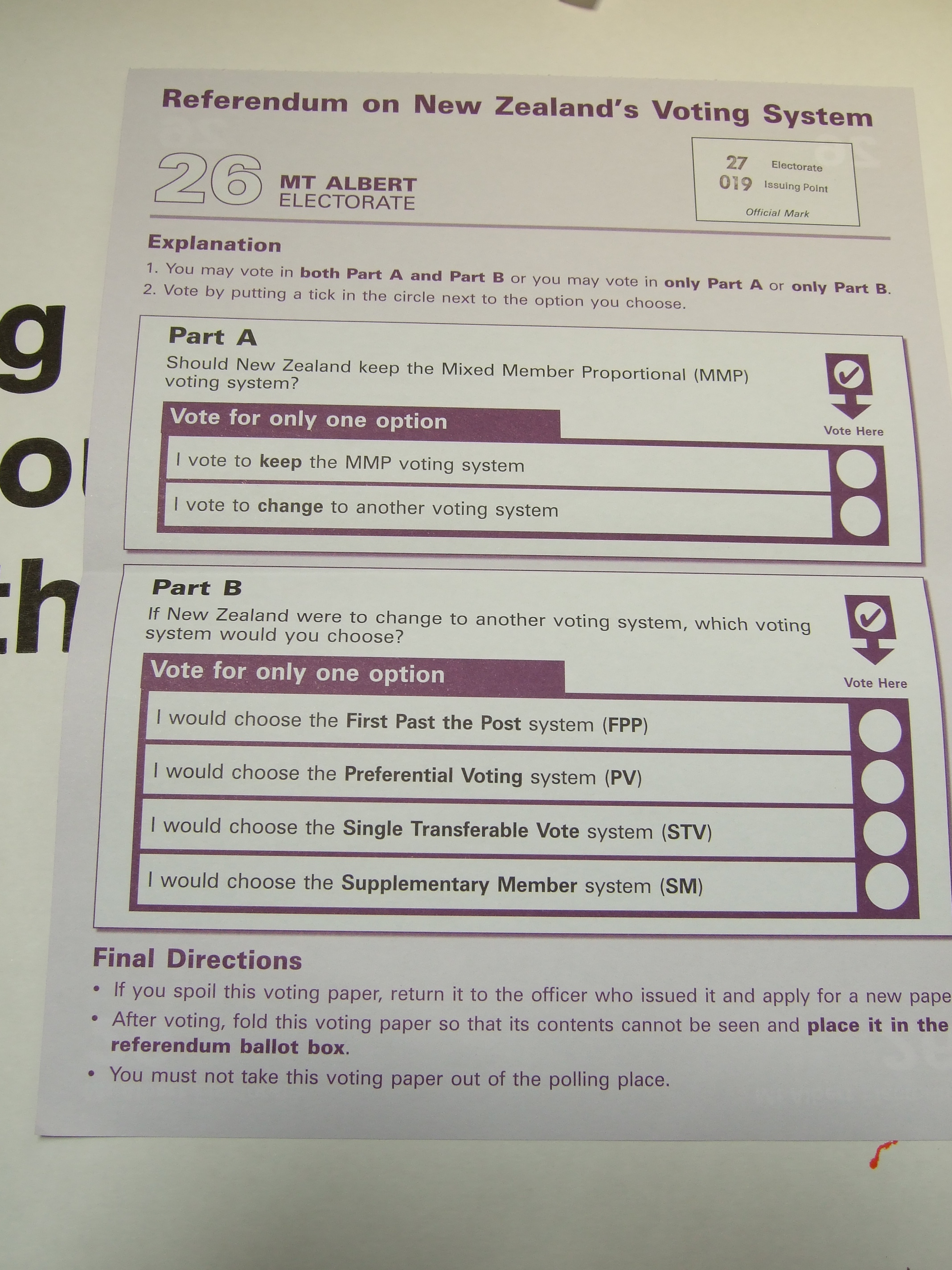
A referendum ballot paper

When voting in the 2011 general election, voters received a purple referendum ballot paper in addition to their normal orange voting paper. The ballot paper asks two questions. Voters could choose to answer both questions, only one of the questions, or neither question. Once the voters made their choice, the referendum ballot paper was deposited in a separate purple-coloured ballot box under their respective electorates.

The first question is "Should New Zealand keep the Mixed Member Proportional (MMP) voting system?" The options provided are:

- I vote to keep the MMP voting system
- I vote to change to another voting system

Simple Yes or No answers to this question have been avoided to reduce ambiguity – a problem that was encountered with the 2009 citizens-initiated referendum.

The second question is "If New Zealand were to change to another voting system, which voting system would you choose?" The four choices offered are:

- I would choose the First Past the Post system (FPP)
- I would choose the Preferential Voting system (PV)
- I would choose the Single Transferable Vote system (STV)
- I would choose the Supplementary Member system (SM)

=== Alternative voting systems ===
First past the post was used in New Zealand prior to MMP, and the three other systems were recommended by the Royal Commission on the Electoral System for further scrutiny in 1986 and were voted on in 1992.

- First past the post – There are 120 electorates across New Zealand electing one MP each, and each voter votes for a candidate in their local electorate. The candidate with the highest number of votes in that electorate is elected the MP for that electorate. This system was used for general elections in New Zealand prior to 1996, and is still used under the MMP system today to elect electorate MPs and conduct by-elections. It is also used by all regional councils and the majority of city and district councils. Countries using this voting system include the United Kingdom, the United States, and the Philippines.
- Preferential voting – Also known as instant-runoff voting (IRV) and alternative vote (AV). There are 120 electorates across New Zealand electing one MP each, and each voter ranks the candidates in their local electorate by order of preference, starting with 1 for their most preferred candidate. Using transfer of votes and elimination of candidates, one candidate will receive an absolute majority (50%+1) of the votes, and subsequently is elected the MP for that electorate. This system is used for electing mayors of some New Zealand city and district councils, including Dunedin and Wellington City. Countries using this voting system include Australia (lower house).
- Single transferable vote – Voting is similar to preferential voting in that voters rank candidates on order of preference, with the major difference being that the approximately 40 electorates across New Zealand would return three to seven MPs each. In the end each vote is only used once to elect someone despite multiple members elected in each district. Using the first preferences marked on the votes and subsequently the transfer of votes arising from election and elimination of candidates, the most-popular candidates are found and elected MPs for that electorate, with the elected members being elected by a high proportion of votes cast. The STV system is used by all district health boards to elect councillors, and is also used in multi-member wards of some city and district councils, including Dunedin and Wellington City. Countries using this system include Australia (upper house) and the Republic of Ireland.
- Supplementary member – Also known as parallel voting. Each voter receives two votes: one for a party and a one for their local electorate MP. In each of the 90 electorates across New Zealand, the local MP is elected using first past the post, and the candidate with the most votes is elected the MP for that electorate. In addition to the 90 electorate MPs, 30 list MPs are elected at-large using the party vote, with the proportion of the 30 seats a party gets being determined by the proportion of the party vote – if a party gets 30% of the party votes, it gets 30% of the list seats (i.e. 9 seats). It has never been used in New Zealand. Countries using this system include Japan and South Korea.

== After the referendum ==
Under the Electoral Referendum Act 2010, the referendum results could trigger the two possible outcomes. In the unlikely event of a tie, then the keep MMP option would eventuate.

=== Majority vote to keep the MMP system ===
If the voters voted in majority to keep the existing MMP system, then the system would be retained. Also under the Electoral Referendum Act, if the majority of voters voted to keep MMP, then an inquiry into the MMP system would automatically be undertaken by the Electoral Commission to see if any modification is desirable, including to thresholds (currently a party needs 5% of the party vote or one electorate to get seats in Parliament), the order of candidates on party lists (the inability of voters to rank list candidates in order of preference), proportionality (overhangs, and the effects of population change on the number of general electorate seats), and dual candidacy (electorate candidates also running as list candidates).

There were calls from the Labour and Green parties, and even the opposing Vote for Change group, to hold the review of MMP regardless of the result of the referendum to resolve problems in the current system before it goes to the second referendum.

=== Majority vote to change the electoral system ===
If the voters voted in majority to change to another electoral system, then the government following the 2011 election could call a second referendum to be held on or before the next general election (which assuming the 2011 election is held on 26 November, would have to occur on or before 31 January 2015^{b}). This second referendum, like in 1993, would allow voters to choose between the MMP system, and the alternative system that received the most votes in the 2011 referendum. The system that received the majority in the second referendum would become the voting system for the following general elections.

== Campaigning ==
=== Electoral Commission ===
The Electoral Commission started its information campaign in late May 2011, sending out information on the voting process with its enrolment update campaign. It has launched a website, with information on the five voting systems.

On the decision for which voting system to vote for, the Electoral Commission said that no voting system is perfect, each system has its advantages and disadvantages, and it is up to the voters to decide. It did pose five questions for people to consider answers to on selecting a voting system:

1. Does the electoral system translate votes into seats reflecting the share of votes won by political parties?
2. Does the electoral system produce parliaments able to represent and reflect the views of Māori, different ethnic groups and geographical regions, women and minorities?
3. Does the electoral system produce stable governments able to fulfil their responsibilities?
4. Does the electoral system produce parliaments able to scrutinise the actions and policies of governments?
5. Does the electoral system allow voters to hold MPs and the government accountable?

=== In favour of keeping MMP ===
The Campaign for MMP group was established to mobilise support for the mixed-member proportional (MMP) representation electoral system leading up to the 2011 referendum. It was headed by three spokespeople: New Zealand Tertiary Education Union president Sandra Grey, chair of the Republican Movement of Aotearoa New Zealand Lewis Holden and Dunedin writer and historian Philip Temple, and was supported by multiple people including former All Black captain Anton Oliver.

The Green Party "welcomed" the referendum proposal, but argued for the questions to be written by an independent body, and to have spending limits on the campaign. The party supports the retention of MMP, saying it is a fair and representative system. Its late co-leader Rod Donald was a major advocate for the implementation of MMP in 1992/93, with the former co-leader alongside Donald, Jeanette Fitzsimons, saying the implementation of MMP was his greatest legacy.

Major arguments for the retention of MMP are:

- The system allows everyone's vote to be counted equally.
- The number of votes received by a party is proportional to the number of seats it obtains.
- The system allows parliament to reflect more representative cross-section of the general population.
- The system has allowed more women, Māori, Pacific Islanders, Asians and minorities to become MPs.
- The system produces stable governments, and changing voting systems would produce political instability until the system beds in.
- MMP is flexible and the system can be altered to suit.
- Voting for MMP will trigger an independent review to improve the system.
- Changing system without first fixing the current system is "throwing the baby out with the bathwater"

=== In favour of changing system ===
The Vote for Change group was established to mobilise support for a change in the electoral system. It was headed as spokesperson by Wellington lawyer Jordan Williams, and supported by multiple people including former Crown Minister Michael Bassett, former chairman of Telecom (and main opponent of MMP in the 1993 referendum) Peter Shirtcliffe, and former Mayor of Wellington Kerry Prendergast. Bob Harvey, former Mayor of Waitakere City, withdrew his support for the group on 3 July 2011 over allegations another founding member had white supremacist links.

Major arguments for a change of system are:

- MMP has led to parties holding power over MPs, and voters can't easily hold government and MPs accountable
- The current configuration allows MPs voted out by their electorate to re-enter parliament via the party list (the "backdoor")
- Smaller parties currently hold a disproportionate amount of power in forming governments.
- There should be more certainty to voters in government formation more of the time, rather than having to wait for post-election negotiations.^{c}
- Governments should be held to their promises, rather than having to compromise on promises in coalition and confidence-and-supply agreement.^{c}
- There are too many list MPs serving the party executive rather than being accountable to the voting public.
- There needs to be a proper debate – the 2011 referendum will be lost in the excitement of the 2011 Rugby World Cup (which New Zealand hosted between 9 September and 23 October), so voting to change will allow a proper debate to take place at the second referendum.
- Voting for MMP will allow MPs to manipulate any changes to the system to their own benefit.

Peter Shirtcliffe, who campaigned against MMP in the 1992/93 referendums, again supported campaigning against MMP. In April 2010, he and the late Graeme Hunt launched the Put MMP to the Vote campaign to advocate for the removal of MMP and its replacement with Supplementary Membership. However, in the announcement, he sent mixed signals on his opposition to MMP when he said that "Supplementary Membership already operates successfully in the Scottish Parliament and the National Assembly for Wales" – both legislatures actually use a variant of MMP and not SM. Shirtcliffe also attacked the referendum process as flawed and called for a quicker second round of votes to allow any electoral system to be in place before the next general election, preferential voting on alternative voting systems and a question on the reduction of Parliament seats from 120 to 100.

== Opinion polls and surveys ==
Poll	Date	Part A			Part B				
Poll	Date	Keep MMP	Change system	Undecided	FPP	PV	STV	SM	Undecided/ Not asked
1993 referendum	6 November 1993	53.9	46.1	–					
20 October 2009 – Justice Minister Simon Power announces a voting method referendum will be held at the next general election.
UMR Research	27 October 2009	48	40	11	n/a				
The New Zealand Herald DigiPoll	2 November 2009	35.8	49	15.2	n/a				
TVNZ Colmar Brunton	December 2009	54	36	10	n/a				
UMR Research Ltd	February 2010	49	42	9	37	18	12	4	29
ShapeNZ (NZBCSD)	9 August 2010	37.5	46.6	11.9	n/a				
20 December 2010 – Electoral Referendum Bill receives Royal Assent – final question wording set.
TVNZ Colmar Brunton	20 December 2010	50	41	9	n/a				
The New Zealand Herald Digipoll	13 January 2011	51	40	9	n/a				
2 February 2011 – Prime Minister John Key announces general election and referendum date as 26 November 2011.
UMR Research	9 May 2011	50	40	10	40	17	8	3	32
Research NZ	16 June 2011	49	38	12	33	5 (combined)			62
New Zealand Herald Digipoll	29 October 2011	48	35	15	n/a				
Fairfax Media Research International	11 November 2011	48.9	33.2	17.9	n/a				
New Zealand Herald Digipoll	11 November 2011	47.3	41.9	10.8	n/a				
3 News	11 November 2011	55	37	8	n/a				
One News Colmar Brunton	13 November 2011	51	37	12	36	8	16	7	30
New Zealand Herald Digipoll	25 November 2011	54.4	35.0	10.6	29.9	11.4	17.2	13.0	28.5
Poll	Date	Keep MMP	Change system	Undecided	FPP	PV	STV	SM	Undecided/ Not asked
Poll	Date	Part A			Part B				

== Results ==
To prevent the delay of general election results, preliminary counts of the referendum results did not take place at polling places – instead the referendum ballot boxes were to be unsealed, inspected, packaged and sent to the Returning Officer of the electorate for an official count. Advance referendum votes were to be counted by the Returning Officers on election night and released gradually on election night. In total, over 330,000 advance votes were cast, around 11% of the total New Zealand electorate. The official results, including all special votes, were released on 10 December 2011.

=== Part A ===
In Part A, 57.8 percent of valid votes were in favour of keeping the MMP system, with 42.2 percent in favour of change. Around three percent of the votes were informal. Compared to the 1993 referendum, there was a 3.9 percent increase in support for the MMP system.

In terms of electorates, 56 voted in majority to keep MMP while 14 voted in majority to change system. The seven Maori electorates had the largest votes in favour of keeping MMP, with Waiariki having the highest percentage in favour – 85.5 percent. Clutha-Southland had the highest percentage in favour of change – 55.4 percent.

Part A results by electorate Keep Change

Voting system referendum 2011: Part A Should New Zealand keep the Mixed Member Proportional (MMP) voting system?
Response	Votes	%	
Response	Votes	valid	total
Yes – keep MMP; I vote to keep the MMP voting system	1,267,955	57.77	56.17
No – change system I vote to change to another voting system	926,819	42.23	41.06
Total valid votes	2,194,774	100.00	97.23
Informal votes	62,469	–	2.77
Total votes	2,257,243	–	100.00
Turnout	73.51%		
Electorate	3,070,847		

=== Part B ===
Voting system referendum 2011: Part B If New Zealand were to change to another voting system, which voting system would you choose?
Response	Votes	%	
Response	Votes	valid	total
First Past the Post (FPP); I would choose the First Past the Post system (FPP)	704,117	46.66	31.19
Preferential Voting (PV); I would choose the Preferential Voting system (PV)	188,164	12.47	8.34
Single Transferable Vote (STV); I would choose the Single Transferable Vote system (STV)	252,503	16.30	11.19
Supplementary Member (SM); I would choose the Supplementary Member system (SM)	364,373	24.14	16.14
Total valid votes	1,509,157	100.00	66.86
Informal votes	748,086	–	33.14
Total votes cast	2,257,243	–	100.00
Turnout	73.51%		
Electorate	3,070,847		

== Footnotes ==
- ^b The writs of election for a 26 November election are returnable on 15 December 2011. Under the Electoral Act 1993, if not dissolved earlier, Parliament will dissolve automatically three years to the day afterwards (15 December 2014), and an election must be held on a Saturday within the next 57 days (i.e. before 10 February 2015). As the Saturday 7 February falls on a long weekend due to Waitangi Day on Friday 6 February, the last possible day is Saturday 31 January 2015.
- ^c This is provided that there are no hung parliaments. One analysis shows, of the five general elections since MMP was introduced, there have been two elections where if the election was held under SM or FPP the parliament would have been hung: one in 1996 and the other in 2005.

== See also ==
- Referendums in New Zealand
- Electoral system of New Zealand
- Electoral reform in New Zealand
