= Referendums in New Zealand =

Referendums (or referenda) are held only occasionally by the Government of New Zealand. Referendums may be government-initiated or held in accordance with the Electoral Act 1993 or the Citizens Initiated Referenda Act 1993. Nineteen referendums have been held so far (excluding referendums on alcohol licensing, which were held triennially between 1894 and 1989); fourteen were government-led, and five were indicative citizen initiatives.

== Government referendums ==
The government of New Zealand may, at any time, call for a referendum on any issue. This requires enabling legislation to determine whether the outcome will be binding on the government or merely indicative. This allows parliamentary scrutiny of the issue and wording of the question. There is no constraint on whether an issue is to be decided by the New Zealand Parliament or by the public, except for where the reserved provisions of the Electoral Act 1993 are engaged. Section 268 of the Electoral Act 1993 protects some of the provisions of the Act from amendment except in accordance with s 268(2) which requires a majority vote in a referendum of a 75% majority of Members of Parliament. The protected provisions include, inter alia, the term of Parliament, the voting age and the voting method. The provision itself is not protected from ordinary amendment or repeal.

This has led to the sporadic use of referendums, partly because there is no constitutional requirement, as there is in other countries like Australia or Switzerland that have codified constitutions.

Recent examples are the New Zealand flag referendums held across 2015 and 2016, conducted by postal vote.

=== Constitutional referendums ===
There is no requirement for a referendum to enact constitutional change in New Zealand. Referendums were held in 1992 and 1993 to decide the nature of electoral reform in New Zealand. Many groups advocate approval of constitutional reforms by referendums; the Republican Movement supports a referendum on whether New Zealand should become a republic.

There are frequent calls for the use of referendums to decide other constitutional matters, rather than by regular Acts of Parliament. In 2003 the Fifth Labour Government replaced the Privy Council as New Zealand's highest court of appeal with a new Supreme Court, despite calls from New Zealand First, National and ACT for a referendum to be held on the issue. In 1950 the abolition of the Legislative Council by the First National Government was done by Act of Parliament; with additional members of the Legislative Council (MLC) appointed to ensure approval by the upper house, the suicide squad.

Date	Turnout	Issue	Result
23 September 1967	69.7	Term of Parliament	68.1% in favour of staying at three-year maximum
27 October 1990	85.2	Term of Parliament	69.3% in favour of staying at three-year maximum
19 September 1992	55.2	Voting system	84.7% for change, 70.5% to MMP
6 November 1993	85.2	Voting system	53.9% for MMP
26 November 2011	73.5	Voting system	57.8% for keeping MMP

=== Liquor licensing referendums ===
In New Zealand, alcohol licensing has historically been decided by referendum. The first of these were compulsory local licensing referendums, held in 1894 and then with each main parliamentary election between 1896 and 1914. Local licensing referendums were eliminated after 1914, apart from 'local restoration polls' to legalise liquor sales in 'dry' districts. In 1910 a referendum on national prohibition of alcohol was introduced, and held in conjunction with every general election from 1911 to 1987 inclusive (except 1931 and 1951). An extra referendum on prohibition was held on 10 April 1919. From 17 December 1919 the additional option of state purchase and control of liquor (i.e. nationalisation) was added to the ballot. The Sale of Liquor Act 1989 abolished the national liquor referendum. Local restoration polls were still held in areas that were still 'dry', but the last three, Mount Eden, Mount Roskill and Tawa, all became 'wet' in 1999. There have been two referendums on pub closing times.

Date	% Voters	Issue	Result
9 March 1949	56.40	Six o'clock closing	Three-to-one majority to retain
23 September 1967	71.20	Six o'clock closing	Two-to-one majority for later opening

=== Other referendums ===
The government may call referendums on any issues on which it wishes. These will usually be on issues on which the government is split. For the 1997 referendum on retirement savings, the decision to hold it was part of the coalition agreement between National and New Zealand First. For the 2020 referendum on Voluntary Euthanasia, it was originally meant to be passed as a bill of parliament but New Zealand First threatened to vote it down if it wasn't considered to be voted by the people during the 2020 election. The 2020 Cannabis referendum was based on the Confidence and Supply agreement between the Labour Party and the Green Party.

Date	% Voters	Issue	Result
9 March 1949	54.3	Allow off-course betting	68.0% in favour
3 August 1949	63.5	Compulsory military training	77.9% in favour
5 September 1997	80.3	Compulsory Retirement Savings Scheme	91.8% against
20 November – 11 December 2015	48.2	New Zealand flag, first stage	50.58% for Silver Fern (Black, White and Blue) after 4 counts
3–24 March 2016	67.8	New Zealand flag, second stage	56.6% for retaining the existing flag of New Zealand
17 October 2020	82.24	Legalizing the sale, use, possession and production of cannabis	51.17% against
17 October 2020	82.24	Allowing voluntary euthanasia on certain conditions	65.91% in favour

== Citizens Initiated Referenda ==
The Citizens Initiated Referenda Act 1993 allows for citizens to propose a referendum. These are non-binding referendums on any issue in which proponents have submitted a petition to Parliament signed by ten percent of all registered electors within 12 months. There were 3,298,009 voters enrolled for the 2017 general election, so at least 329,801 signatures would be required at a rate of approximately 904 signatures per day. In reality, more signatures would be required to account for variances in electoral roll numbers, duplicate signatures and signatures that cannot be matched to a registered elector.

There are procedural requirements governing this process. It costs NZ$500 to file a petition asking for a referendum with the Clerk of the House of Representatives. The Clerk formally determines the wording of the question, which may be quite different from the original. Once the Clerk receives the completed petition, the number of signatures is initially counted, followed by sample groups of signatures being taken and the signatories' names and addresses checked against the electoral roll. The sampling of signatures is used to estimate the number of valid signatures for the whole petition with confidence, and if the lower confidence interval is more than ten percent of the electoral roll, the petition is presented to the House of Representatives.

Within one month of the petition's presentation to the House, a date for the poll must be determined. The poll must be held within 12 months of the petition's presentation, unless 75 percent of MPs vote to delay the poll for one year. There is also a $50,000 spending limit on promoting the petition.

New Zealand, Italy, and Switzerland are among countries whose laws allow for citizen-initiated referendums (CIRs) nationally. Its defenders view it as a form of "direct democracy". However, the Citizens Initiated Referendum 1993 went against the advice of the Royal Commission on the Electoral System 1986. The Commission stated, speaking about referendums more broadly, "In general, initiatives and referendums are blunt and crude devices.... [that] would blur the lines of accountability and responsibility of Governments".

A total of 48 petitions have been launched since 1993 on a wide range of topics. Only five (one in 1995, two in 1999, one in 2009, one in 2013) have come to a vote. The other petitions failed to gain enough signatures to force a referendum. Achieving the target number of signatures is a requirement for forcing a vote on an initiative proposed by citizens.

=== Firefighters ===
The first citizens initiated referendum was held on 2 December 1995. The question "Should the number of professional fire-fighters employed full-time in the New Zealand Fire Service be reduced below the number employed on 1 January 1995?" aimed to elicit a "no" response. Turnout was low as the referendum was not held in conjunction with a general election. Just over 12% voted "Yes" and almost 88% voted "No".

=== 1999 election ===
At the 1999 election two referendums were put before voters. One was on whether the number of Members of Parliament should be reduced from 120 to 99. Electors overwhelmingly voted in favour of the proposal, with 81.47% voting for this proposal. However, there were no moves to amend the Electoral Act 1993 in line with this result until 2006 when a bill was introduced by New Zealand First MP Barbara Stewart to reduce the size of Parliament to 100. The bill passed its first reading, 61 votes to 60 and was referred to Select Committee. The Select Committee returned recommending the bill to not be passed, citing reasons including public misconception on the MMP voting system, population growth, and international comparability. The bill was subsequently voted down 112 to 9 at its second reading.

The other referendum held in 1999 asked "Should there be a reform of our Justice system placing greater emphasis on the needs of victims, providing restitution and compensation for them and imposing minimum sentences and hard labour for all serious violent offences?". This measure passed by 91.78%. There was some debate over the phrasing of the referendum, as the question actually contains five separate questions; voters could agree with some, but not with others.

=== Parental corporal punishment ===
Following the submission of a petition on 22 August 2008, the Clerk of the House verified to Parliament that the threshold for a CIR had been reached. Supporters were hoping for the referendum to be held alongside the 8 November general election, but it was decided by Parliament to hold the referendum by postal ballot between 31 July and 21 August 2009.

The question asked was "Should a smack as part of good parental correction be a criminal offence in New Zealand?"

Voter turnout was 56.1 percent. While 87.4 percent of votes answered 'no', the question drew widespread criticism from the public, parliament, and even then-Prime Minister John Key for being a loaded question and for the use of the value-judgement 'good'.

=== Opponents of citizens initiated referendums ===
The perceived lack of implementation of successful referendums has led to calls for such referendums to be made binding on the government of the day, similar to the direct democracy said to exist in Switzerland. ACT New Zealand, Family First New Zealand, the Sensible Sentencing Trust and Kiwi Party all advocate binding referendums. However, Kiwi Party President Larry Baldock failed to submit enough signatures for a petition that might have led to a non-binding referendum on whether or not binding citizens referendums should be introduced after being granted permission to circulate a petition calling for that innovation, so the status quo remains. Although the Kiwi Party applied for deregistration, the cause has been taken up by the Conservative Party of New Zealand and its leader, Colin Craig.

By contrast, GayNZ.com has run articles strongly critical of the CIR lobby, as well as expressing concerns that CIRs could be abused to strip vulnerable minorities of their legislative protections, as has occurred frequently with referendums against same-sex marriage in the United States and similar proposals that target illegal immigrants in that country. In some New Zealand media outlets, the Minaret controversy in Switzerland has also been cited as one current example of anti-minoritarian abuse of the 'citizens' referendum process.

Even amongst conservatives, the issue has become contentious. The Maxim Institute has announced its opposition to binding citizens referendums, citing the adverse fiscal management consequences that have ensued in the state of California in a recent paper from Richard Ekins, a University of Auckland legal academic. Former New Zealand Prime Minister John Key also opposes binding referendums on fiscal grounds, noting that California's contradictory tax cap and public spending referendums have made state fiscal management chaotic. However, a key problem with that argument is that ballot initiatives only make up 2% of the Californian state budget, once Proposition 98 is removed from the equation (Proposition 98 locks in education spending which probably would have been spent anyway and had always occupied about one-third of the Californian budget).

During 2009, there was additional criticism from prominent New Zealand legal academics, such as Andrew Geddis and Bridget Fenton at Otago University. They argue that CIRs are no substitute for more deliberative processes within the existing framework of representative democracy, such as joining political parties, protest marches, voting within general elections and parliamentary select committee submissions.

=== Table of petitions and referendums ===
The following table lists petition questions lodged with Clerk of the House from 1994 to 2019. Questions lodged since then are not included. Note that some questions may have been worded so that "no" was the desired response by the proposer.

Date proposal received by Clerk of the House	Sponsor / name of proposer	Question proposed	Question determined	Date determination of question gazetted	Date signatures to be collected by	Result
1 February 1994	Royal New Zealand Society for the Prevention of Cruelty to Animals	Should the inhumane practice of battery egg production be phased out within five years from this referendum?	Should the production of eggs from battery hens be prohibited within five years of the referendum?	28 April 1994	28 April 1995	Petition delivered to Clerk; Petition lapsed (insufficient signatures)
28 March 1994	Christian Heritage Party	Should a judge be given the power to decide whether life imprisonment for murder should mean a prisoner will be imprisoned for his/her natural life?	Should a Judge sentencing a person convicted of murder to life imprisonment be empowered to order that the person be imprisoned for his or her natural life and not be eligible for parole?	23 June 1994	23 June 1995	Petition lapsed
25 May 1994	Michael Laws MP, Hon Winston Peters MP, Geoff Braybrooke MP	Should the size of Parliament be reduced from 120 Members of Parliament to 100 by reducing the number of "list" MPs from 55 seats to 35 seats?	Should the size of Parliament be reduced from 120 Members of Parliament to 100 by reducing the number elected from the party list?	18 August 1994	18 August 1995	Petition lapsed
20 June 1994	Next Step Democracy Movement	All New Zealanders should have access to a non-profit public health service which is fully government funded and without user charges.				Question withdrawn by proposer on 16 September 1994
20 June 1994	Next Step Democracy Movement	All new Zealanders should have access to non-profit education service that is fully government funded and without user charges, from pre-school to tertiary level.				Question withdrawn by proposer on 16 September 1994
20 June 1994	Next Step Democracy Movement	The central goals of government economic policy should be full employment at liveable wages and, for those not in the paid workforce, an income based on what it actually costs to live.				Question withdrawn by proposer on 16 September 1994
20 June 1994	Next Step Democracy Movement	New Zealand's military budget should be reduced to half its 1994 level by the year 2000 and the savings allocated to health, education, employment and conservation.				Question withdrawn by proposer on 16 September 1994
20 June 1994	Next Step Democracy Movement	The Employment Contracts Act should be replaced with laws that deliver pay equity and are consistent with the International Labour Organisation's conventions and the United Nations' International Bill of Human Rights.				Question withdrawn by proposer, on 16 September 1994
20 June 1994	Next Step Democracy Movement	Any increase in New Zealand's electricity demand should be met from energy conservation and from sources that are environmentally sustainable, and do not produce carbon dioxide (CO2).				Question withdrawn by proposer on 16 September 1994
29 August 1994	William Maung Maung	Do you want a Constitutional Enactment to enable the enforcement of political accountability?	Should there be a legally enforceable requirement that political parties observe their constitution and their manifesto promises?	17 November 1994	17 November 1995	Petition lapsed
11 November 1994	New Zealand Professional Fire-Fighters Union	Should the number of firefighters employed in the New Zealand Fire Service be reduced?	Should the number of professional fire fighters employed full-time in the New Zealand Fire Service be reduced below the number employed on 1 January 1995?	9 February 1995	9 February 1996	Referendum failed. Petition successful—presented to House on 30 May 1995; select committee report on 22 June 1995; referendum held on 2 December 1995. (27.0% turnout - 12.2% yes; 87.8% no)
30 November 1994	Next Step Democracy Movement	Should all New Zealanders have access to public health services, which are fully government funded, and without user charges?	Should all New Zealanders have access to comprehensive health services, which are fully government funded, and without user charges?	23 February 1995	23 February 1996	Delivered to Clerk, Petition lapsed (insufficient signatures)
30 November 1994	Next Step Democracy Movement	Should all New Zealanders have access to public education services, from early childhood to tertiary level, which are fully government funded and without user charges?	Should all New Zealanders have access to public education services, from early childhood to tertiary level, which are fully government funded and without user charges?	23 February 1995	23 February 1996	Delivered to Clerk, Petition lapsed (insufficient signatures)
30 November 1994	Next Step Democracy Movement	Should full employment with wages and conditions that are fair and equitable be the central goal of government economic policy?	Should full employment with wages and conditions that are fair and equitable be the primary goal of government economic policy?	23 February 1995	23 February 1996	Petition lapsed
30 November 1994	Next Step Democracy Movement	Should all New Zealanders on income support and benefits get an income based on what it actually costs to live?	Should all New Zealanders on income support and benefits get an income based on what it actually costs to live?	23 February 1995	23 February 1996	Petition lapsed
30 November 1994	Next Step Democracy Movement	Should increases in New Zealand's electricity demand be met from energy conservation and from the use of resources that are environmentally sustainable?	Should increases in New Zealand's electricity demand be met from energy conservation and from the use of sources that are environmentally sustainable?	23 February 1995	23 February 1996	Not delivered to Clerk - lapsed
30 November 1994	Next Step Democracy Movement	Should New Zealand's military budget be reduced to half its 1994/1995 level by the year 2000 with the savings spent on health, education, conservation and the promotion of full employment?	Should New Zealand's defence expenditure be reduced to half its 1994/95 level by the year 2000 with the savings spent on health, education, conservation and the promotion of full employment?	23 February 1995	23 February 1996	Petition lapsed
19 December 1994	One New Zealand Foundation	Should the laws of New Zealand apply equally to all New Zealanders irrespective of ethnic origin?	Do you agree that the laws of New Zealand should not discriminate against or give preference to citizens or permanent residents of New Zealand on the basis of their ethnic origins?	23 March 1995	23 March 1996	Petition lapsed
15 September 1995	Companion and the Voluntary Euthanasia Society (Auckland) Inc	Should voluntary euthanasia be legalised for persons 18 years and older?	Should people aged 18 years and over who are terminally or incurably ill be permitted to have their lives ended if they request this, in a humane manner and in accordance with procedures to be established?	14 December 1995	14 December 1996	Withdrawn on 6 May 1996
15 April 1996	Jim Anderton MP	Should the Forestry Corporation's plantation forests, mills, and rights in perpetuity to 188,000 hectares of Crown land, remain in New Zealand public ownership?	Should the forestry licenses to 188,000 hectares of Crown forest land which are currently held by the Forestry Corporation of New Zealand Limited remain in state ownership (subject to the determination of any Treaty of Waitangi claims)?	13 June 1996	13 June 1997	Delivered to Clerk; Petition lapsed (insufficient signatures)
23 July 1996	Nga Kaitiaki o Te Waonuia Taane o Aotearoa	Should there be a law passed banning any further destruction of the native forests of Aotearoa to preserve the last remnants of our national heritage (pursuant to the Treaty of Waitangi)?	Should all tree felling and clearing on any indigenous land (except in plantation forests and already protected conservation areas be prohibited, unless such tree felling or cleaning is in accordance with Maori customary use?	31 October 1996	31 October 1997	Petition lapsed
17 March 1997	Mark Whyte	Should the Treaty of Waitangi, being an outdated document, be set aside and replaced with a national constitution which guarantees the equal rights of all New Zealanders without favour or discrimination?	Should there be a Written Constitution, taking precedence of the Treaty of Waitangi and all other sources of law, which guarantees the right of all people without favour or discrimination?	19 June 1997	19 June 1998	Petition lapsed
30 June 1997	Margaret Robertson	Should the size of Parliament be reduced from 120 members of Parliament to 99 members of Parliament by reducing the number elected from party lists?	Should the size of the House of Representatives be reduced from 120 members to 99 members?	21 August 1997	21 August 1998	Referendum passed. Petition successful—presented to House on 17 February 1999; referendum held on 27 November 1999. (84.8% turnout - 81.5% yes; 18.5% no)
3 October 1997	Norm Withers	That should there be an urgent reform of our Justice system to introduce restorative justice which seeks to place greater emphasis on the needs of victims and includes hard labour for all serious violent offences?	Should there be a reform of our justice system placing greater emphasis on the needs of the victims, providing restitution and compensation for them and imposing minimum sentences and hard labour for all serious violent offences?	15 January 1998	15 January 1999	Referendum passed. Petition successful—presented to House on 13 July 1999; referendum held on 27 November 1999. (84.8% turnout - 91.8% yes; 8.2% no)
13 October 1997	Cancer Society of New Zealand	That the Government should increase its annual spending on health services to at least 7% of GDP, funded if necessary from personal income tax.	Should the Government increase its annual spending on health services to at least 7% of GDP, funding the increase, if necessary, from personal income tax?	11 December 1997	11 December 1998	Petition lapsed
19 February 1998	Frederick Richards	Should the method of election be termination of the political party system with the election for the constituency candidate as representative by single transferable vote?	Should members of Parliament be elected by single transferable vote (STV) with constituency-based, multi-member electorates?	21 May 1998	21 May 1999	Delivered to Clerk, Petition lapsed (insufficient signatures)
21 December 1998	Gavin Hugh Piercy	Should the Government stop any forced school closures until there have been full and transparent guidelines and procedures adapted by Parliament?	Should there be no further compulsory school closures until comprehensive criteria have been established by law for the Minister of Education to follow when deciding to close a school?	25 March 1999	25 March 2000	Petition lapsed
6 May 1999	Julie Waring	Do you support the request that the Government of New Zealand reduce the number of unemployed people to below 1% of the working population by the year 2004?	Should the government be required to reduce the number of unemployed people to below 1% of the labour force by the year 2004?	12 August 1999	12 August 2000	Petition lapsed
29 June 1999	The Free New Zealand Party Society Inc	Should government let New Zealanders have democracy by referendum where any individual or group can submit opinions which get numbered so we can list what we agree with and list what we disagree with, then the results are sent to four independent committees who create four separate laws and we vote for the most suitable one?	Should New Zealand adapt direct democracy by binding referendum whereby ideas for laws should be submitted and voted upon as of right by the public and, according to the result, submissions collected from the public and then assessed by opinion poll, resulting un draft law alternatives being prepared by independent groups, from which one opinion would be chosen by majority vote by the public; the resulting legislation to be binding?	14 October 1999	14 October 2000	Petition lapsed
29 March 2000	Raymond Lorenzen	Should the Government ban the sale and distribution of tobacco products?	Should Parliament enact legislation to ban the sale and distribution of tobacco?	6 July 2000	6 July 2001	Petition lapsed
18 May 2000	Tim Hawkins	Should Dr Newman's Shared Parenting Bill be made law in the Family Court?	Should the Shared Parenting Bill introduced by Dr Muriel Newman (which creates a presumption that parents who are separated or divorced will have equal rights to custody of their children) be passed by Parliament?	17 August 2000	17 August 2001	Petition lapsed
26 October 2000	Dennis Crisp	Do you believe that New Zealand should hold a binding referendum on whether we should replace MMP by a return to first-past-the-post elections?				Question withdrawn by promoter (between 2 and 8 November 2000)
21 December 2000	Stuart F E Marshall	Should the current review of the voting system be taken out of the hands of self-interested politicians by holding another binding referendum to decide the future voting system, recognising the already clearly established public demand to reduce the number of MPs to 99?	Should a binding referendum be held to decide the future voting system, based on a Parliament of 99 MPs?	22 March 2001	22 March 2002	Petition lapsed
26 July 2001	Ian Wishart on behalf of the Constitution Trust of New Zealand	Should New Zealand adopt a written constitution which protects fundamental human and civil rights and which transfers legal sovereignty from the Crown to the people?	Should New Zealand adopt a written constitution expressly vesting sovereignty in the people and protecting fundamental human and civil rights?	12 October 2001	22 October 2002	Petition lapsed
11 February 2003	Steve Baron (Better Democracy)	Should legislation be enacted to make Citizens Initiated Referenda binding on Government?	Should the law be amended to make the results of citizens initiated referenda binding on the New Zealand Government?	1 May 2003	1 May 2004	Petition withdrawn on 16 February 2004
3 April 2003	Dennis J Gates	Should our longstanding right of final appeal to the Privy Council in London be abolished?	Should all rights of appeal to the Privy Council be abolished?	2 July 2003	2 July 2004	Petition lapsed
29 August 2003	Larry Baldock MP and Gordon Copeland MP	That the Prostitution Law Reform Act 2003 be repealed?	Should the Prostitution Reform Act 2003 be repealed?	29 October 2003	29 October 2004	Delivered to Clerk, Petition lapsed (insufficient signatures)
21 July 2004	NZ Flag.com Trust	Should New Zealand change its flag?	Should the design of the New Zealand flag be changed?	13 October 2004	13 October 2005	Withdrawn on 1 August 2005
10 January 2005	John van Buren	Should the proprietor of a licensed establishment be able to determine whether it is a smoke-free premise?	Should the proprietor of licensed premises be able to determine whether those premises are smoke-free?	6 April 2005	6 April 2006	Petition lapsed
8 January 2007	Larry Baldock	Should the Government give urgent priority to understanding and addressing the wider causes of family breakdown, family violence and child abuse in New Zealand?	Should the Government give urgent priority to understanding and addressing the wider causes of family breakdown, family violence and child abuse in New Zealand?	1 March 2007	29 February 2008	Petition lapsed
21 February 2007	Sheryl Savill	Should a smack within the context of positive parental correction be a criminal offence in New Zealand?	Should a smack as part of good parental correction be a criminal offence in New Zealand?	1 March 2007	29 February 2008	Referendum failed. Petition successful—referendum held by postal ballot between 31 July and 21 August 2009. (56.09% turnout - 87.4% no; 11.98% yes)
14 September 2007	William (Bill) Elliott	Should all citizens initiated referenda be binding on the New Zealand Government?	Should the results of all citizens initiated referenda be binding on the New Zealand Government?	29 November 2007	29 November 2008	Withdrawn on 18 November 2008
11 February 2009	Unite Union	Should the minimum wage be raised to $15 an hour and then in steps over the next three years until it reaches two-thirds of the average ordinary time hourly rate as recommended by the 1973 Royal Commission into Social Security?	Should the adult minimum wage be raised in steps over the next three years, starting with an immediate rise to $15 per hour, until it reaches 66% of the average total hourly earnings as defined in the Quarterly Employment Survey?	7 May 2009	7 May 2010	Withdrawn on 6 May 2010
10 September 2009	Larry Baldock	Should Citizens Initiated Referenda seeking to repeal or amend a law be binding?	Should Parliament be required to pass legislation that implements the majority result of a citizens initiated referendum where that result supports a law change?	17 December 2009	17 December 2010	Petition lapsed
11 April 2011	Dr Muriel Newman and Dr Hugh Barr	Should the Marine and Coastal Area Act be repealed to restore Crown ownership of the foreshore and seabed?	Should the Marine and Coastal Area (Takutai Moana) Act 2011 be replaced by legislation that restores Crown ownership of the foreshore and seabed?	14 July 2011	14 July 2012	Petition lapsed
8 March 2012	Roy Reid	Do you support the Government selling up to 49% of Meridian Energy, Mighty River Power, Genesis Power, Solid Energy and Air New Zealand?	Do you support the Government selling up to 49% of Meridian Energy, Mighty River Power, Genesis Power, Solid Energy and Air New Zealand?	3 May 2012	3 May 2013	Referendum failed. Petition successful—referendum held by postal ballot between 22 November 2013 and 13 December 2013. (45.07% turnout - 67.3% no; 32.4% yes)
23 May 2018	Miriam Clements (The Logic Party)	Should the North Shore establish as an independent city state to demonstrate a new economic model at the heart of New Zealand?	Should the North Shore establish as an independent city state to demonstrate a new economic model at the heart of New Zealand?	12 July 2018	12 July 2019	Petition lapsed
15 November 2018	Tricia Cheel (Friends of Sherwood)	Do you agree that ALL cruel and inhumane poisons be prohibited – including 1080 (sodium monofluoroacetate), brodifacoum, pindone, PAPP and cholecalciferol – because they inflict such intense and prolonged suffering that their use can never be justified?	Should New Zealand stop using all cruel and inhumane poisons, such as 1080, brodifacoum, and PAPP, to kill wildlife, because these toxic substances inflict intense and prolonged, unjustifiable suffering on all animals, including native birds, pets, and livestock?	7 February 2019	7 February 2020	Petition lapsed

The 1999 referendums were held in conjunction with the 1999 general election, which is likely to have played a role in the high proportion of voters.

== Local government ==
Local government (regional councils, territorial councils and District Health Boards) may hold referendum on issues which they feel their citizens need to be consulted upon. Referendums have been held on water fluoridation, changing the electoral system to Single Transferable Vote and merging authorities together.

In 2018, The lobby group Hobson's Pledge (fronted by former National Party and ACT New Zealand leader Don Brash) organised several petitions calling for local referendums on the matter of introducing Māori wards and constituencies, taking advantage of the poll provision. These polls were granted and held in early 2018. Each poll failed; Māori wards were rejected by voters in Palmerston North (68.8%), Western Bay of Plenty (78.2%), Whakatāne (56.4%), Manawatu (77%), and Kaikōura (55%) on 19 May 2018. The average voter turnout in those polls was about 40%.

On 1 February 2021, Labour Minister of Local Government Mahuta announced that the Government would establish a new law upholding local council decisions to establish Māori wards. This new law would also abolish an existing law allowing local referendums to veto decisions by councils to establish Māori wards. This law would come into effect before the scheduled 2022 local body elections. On 25 February, Mahuta's Local Electoral (Māori Wards and Māori Constituencies) Amendment Act 2021, which eliminates mechanisms for holding referendums on the establishment of Māori wards and constituencies on local bodies, passed its third reading in Parliament with the support of the Labour, Green and Māori parties. The bill was unsuccessfully opposed by the National and ACT parties, with the former mounting a twelve-hour filibuster challenging all of the Bill's ten clauses.

In July 2024, the Sixth National Government of New Zealand passed legislation reinstating the requirement for local referendums on the establishment or "ongoing use" of Māori wards and constituencies. While National, ACT and NZ First supported the bill, it was opposed by the Labour, Green, and Māori parties.

Councils that have already established a Māori ward without a referendum are now required to hold a binding poll alongside the 2025 local elections or to disestablish them.

== See also ==
- New Zealand elections
- Electoral system of New Zealand
- New Zealand constitution
