= John Wallace (New Zealand judge) =

New Zealand judge (1934–2012)

Sir John Hamilton Wallace KNZM QC (9 September 1934 – 20 September 2012) was a judge of the High Court of New Zealand

Wallace was born in Auckland, and educated at King's College, Auckland, and Merton College, Oxford, graduating in 1957. He was called to the Bar by Gray's Inn in 1958, and became a barrister the following year. Wallace married Elizabeth Goodwin in 1961 and they had two children. In 1984 Wallace was appointed Chief Human Rights Commissioner and in 1985 was appointed Chairman of the 1985–86 Royal Commission on the Electoral System, which recommended MMP for electing Parliament.

In the 1997 Queen's Birthday Honours, Wallace was appointed a Knight Companion of the New Zealand Order of Merit, in recognition of his services as a judge of the High Court.

Wallace died in Auckland on 20 September 2012.
