= Buy NZ Made =

Campaign to promote New Zealand products

Buy NZ Made is a campaign promoting and encouraging people to buy New Zealand made products. It is run by BusinessNZ, a business advocacy body made up of New Zealand employers and manufacturers.

New Zealand manufacturers, retailers and government have been involved at times in promoting local buying since the "New Zealand Industries Week" of 1908, but the current campaign started in 1988 with Buy New Zealand Made Campaign Ltd formed to license the use of the "kiwi in a triangle" logo. In April 2008 Buy Kiwi Made celebrated 100 years of buying Kiwi made, referring back to the earliest efforts.

== "Buy Kiwi Made" ==
A short-lived government programme, "Buy Kiwi Made" came out of negotiations between the Green Party and New Zealand's Labour Party that resulted in the formation of the government after the 2005 elections. Rod Donald was appointed as the Government's spokesperson for the programme which used the slogan "Buy Kiwi and We've Got it Made". Within a couple of months of the election, and after Rod Donald's death, the Labour government refused a joint Australian-New Zealand initiative to mandate country of origin labeling for food and although the www.buykiwimade.govt.nz/ website was launched on 2 March 2007 it has since been disconnected and the media campaign was concluded by 30 June 2009.
