= Rod Donald =

New Zealand politician (1957–2005)

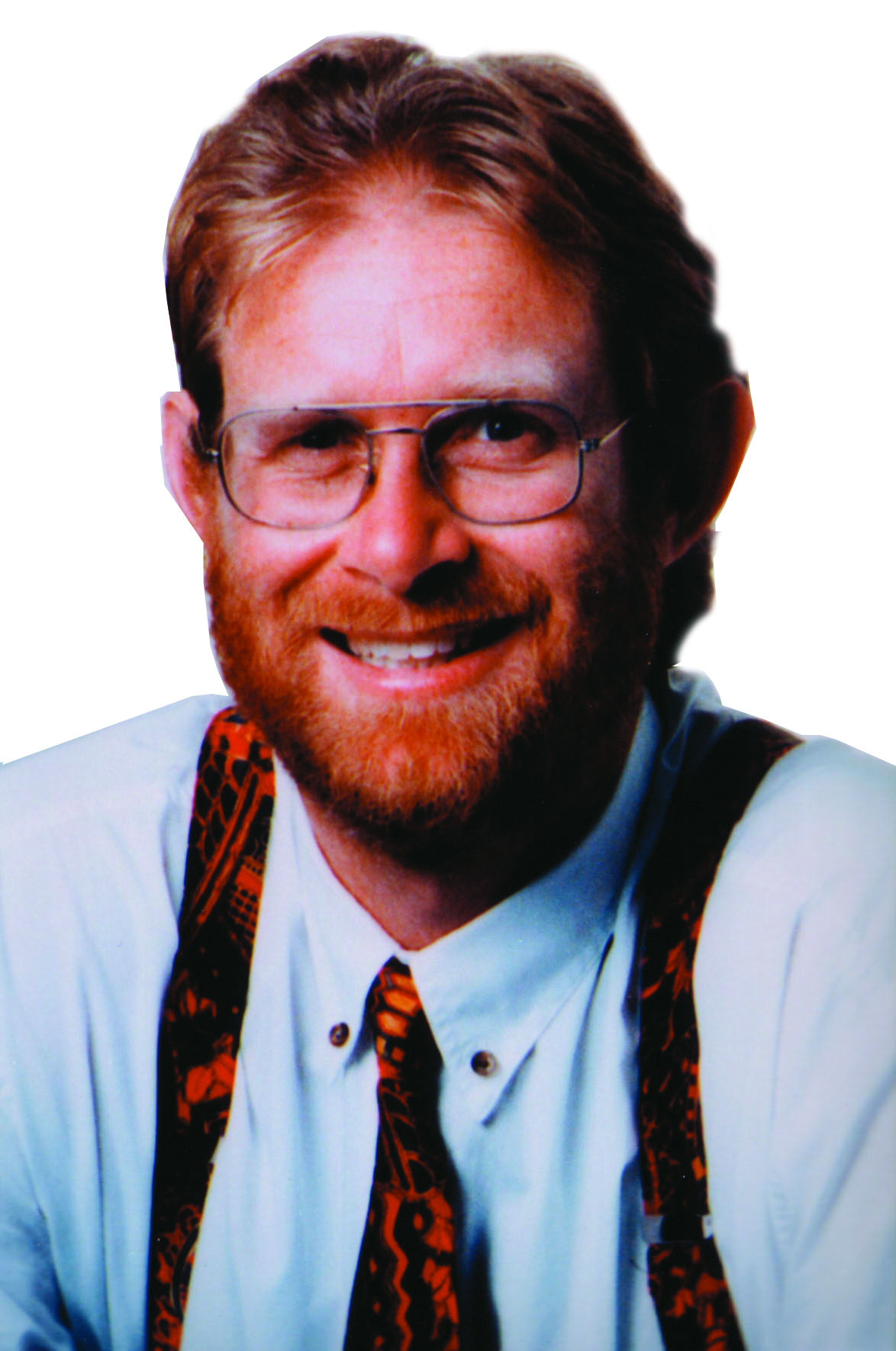

1st Co-leader of the Green Party
- In office 21 May 1995 – 6 November 2005 Co-leading with Jeanette Fitzsimons
- Succeeded by: Russel Norman

Member of the New Zealand Parliament for Green party list
- In office 27 November 1999 – 6 November 2005
- Succeeded by: Nándor Tánczos (Note: Normally, list MPs do not have individual predecessors or successors, but Donald died during a parliamentary term and therefore was succeeded by Tánczos.)

Member of the New Zealand Parliament for Alliance party list
- In office 12 October 1996 – 27 November 1999

Personal details
- Born: 10 October 1957
- Died: 6 November 2005 (aged 48) Christchurch, New Zealand
- Party: Green Party
- Other political affiliations: Labour (1982–1988); Values (1974–1979)
- Domestic partner: Nicola Shirlaw

Rodney David Donald (10 October 1957 – 6 November 2005) was a New Zealand politician who co-led the Green Party of Aotearoa New Zealand, along with Jeanette Fitzsimons.

Since the 1970s he lived in the inner-city Avon Loop community in Christchurch with his partner Nicola Shirlaw, and their three daughters. Donald was a founding member of the Avon Loop Planning Association (ALPA) and encouraged community initiatives in sustainable living.

== Early political career ==
Donald held Values Party membership from 1974 to 1979 and then Labour Party membership from 1982 to 1988. On becoming national spokesperson of the impartial Electoral Reform Coalition from 1989 to 1993 he had to resign his party membership. After the success of the MMP referendum at the 1993 election he joined the Green Party in February 1994. After he became co-leader of the Greens in 1995, voters first elected him to Parliament in the 1996 election as an Alliance list MP.

The Green Party left the Alliance to stand alone in the 1999 election. He entered the 1999 parliament as number two on the Greens' party list. He retained his list seat in the 2002 and 2005 elections.

== Member of Parliament ==
New Zealand Parliament
Years	Term	Electorate	List	Party
1996–1999	45th	List	10	Alliance
1999–2002	46th	List	2	Green
2002–2005	47th	List	2	Green
2005	48th	List	2	Green

For many years Donald had a special interest in electoral reform in New Zealand. From 1989 to 1993 he served as spokesperson for the Electoral Reform Coalition during the campaign that led to the introduction of mixed-member proportional (MMP) representation. Subsequently, he played a major part in getting legislation passed to allow STV voting in local body elections in New Zealand. Co-leader Jeanette Fitzsimons described MMP as Donald's greatest legacy.

He also served as the Green Party spokesperson on Buy Kiwi Made, commerce, electoral reform, finance and revenue, land information, regional development and small business, superannuation, sustainable economics, state services, statistics, tourism, trade, and waste.

== Death ==
Shortly after midnight on 6 November 2005, the day before his scheduled swearing-in for his fourth term in Parliament, he died suddenly at his Christchurch home after suffering for a few days from Campylobacter jejuni food poisoning from an unknown source. An autopsy initially ruled out a heart attack, but subsequent test-results determined that death resulted from an inflammation of the heart muscle (myocarditis), which is a very rare consequence of C. jejuni infection. He was 48 years old. His funeral, which took place at the Christ Church Cathedral, was attended by over 1,000 people. His casket arrived on board an electric bus and his wake took place at the adjacent Warner's Hotel. The Parliament showed its respect for Donald by suspending a day of business, and a minute of silence was observed in the House of Representatives.

He was succeeded in the Green Party leadership by Russel Norman.

== See also ==
- Contents of the United States diplomatic cables leak (New Zealand)
- List of members of the New Zealand Parliament who died in office

== Notes ==
Party political offices
New political party	Male co-leader of the Green Party; 1995–2005; Served alongside: Jeanette Fitzsimons	Succeeded by Dr Russel Norman
