= 1990 New Zealand parliamentary term referendum =

- 27 October 1990
- [_] I vote for 3 years as the term of Parliament as at present. [_] I vote for 4 years as the term of Parliament.

Results
Choice	Votes	%
Three Years	1,258,018	69.33%
Four Years	556,559	30.67%

A referendum on the length of the term of the New Zealand Parliament was held on 27 October 1990. Voters were asked whether they approved of extending the term of office from three years to four. The change was rejected by 69% of voters, with a turnout of 82%.

== Results ==
Choice	Votes	%
Three years	1,258,018	69.33
Four years	556,559	30.67
Total	1,814,577	100.00
Registered voters/turnout	2,202,157	–
Source: Nohlen et al.

== See also ==
- 1967 New Zealand parliamentary term referendum
