= 1993 New Zealand electoral reform referendum =

- 6 November 1993
- Chose one proposal "I vote for the present First Past the Post system as provided by the Electoral Act 1956" "I vote for the proposed Mixed Member Proportional system as provided by the Electoral Act 1993"

Results
Choice	Votes	%
Yes	1,032,919	53.86%
No	884,964	46.14%
Valid votes	1,917,883	100.00%
Invalid or blank votes	0	0.00%
Total votes	1,917,883	100.00%
Registered voters/turnout	2,251,403	85.19%
- Results by electorate

An electoral reform referendum on whether to replace the first-past-the-post voting system with mixed-member proportional representation was held in New Zealand on Saturday, 6 November 1993, in conjunction with that year's general election. This was follow-up to a referendum to test public sentiment that had been held in 1992. The 1992 referendum represented the first tangible governmental step towards electoral reform.

The results of the 1993 referendum overwhelmingly supported change and selected MMP as the preferred electoral system to replace FPP. The "Yes" side prevailed with 53.86% of the vote. The 1996 general election was the first to use the new mixed-member proportional system. The use of MMP was re-confirmed in a 2011 referendum.

== Support and opposition ==
=== Support ===
The Electoral Reform Commission (ERC), who had supported proportional representation (PR) for years, favoured the passage of the referendum.

=== Opposition ===
The Campaign for Better Government opposed the initiative and outspent the ERC eight-to-one. Governor-general Dame Catherine Tizard opposed the initiative and threatened to dissolve parliament if MMP was put forward.
