= Parallel voting =

Mixed electoral system

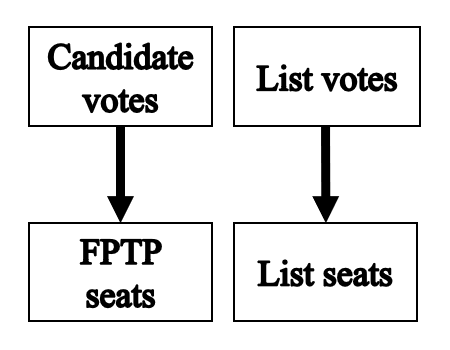
A diagram of a common mixed system using parallel voting. The local tier (here FPTP) and the list tier have no compensation.

In political science, parallel voting or superposition refers to the use of two or more electoral systems to elect different members of a legislature. More precisely, an electoral system is a superposition if it is a mixture of at least two tiers; one portion of a legislature is elected using one method, while another portion is elected using a different method, with all voters participating in both. Thus, the final results are produced by filling the seats using each system separately based on the votes, with the separate groups of elected members meeting together in one chamber.

A system is called fusion (not to be confused with electoral fusion) or majority bonus, if it is an independent mixture of two system without two tiers. Superposition (parallel voting) is also not the same as "coexistence", in which different districts in the same election use different systems. Superposition, fusion and coexistence are distinct from dependent mixed electoral systems like compensatory (corrective) and conditional systems.

Most often, parallel voting involves the use of two separate systems to elect two separate groups of members, such as a winner-take-all system with party-list proportional representation (PR). First-past-the-post voting alongside PR is a common pairing in parallel voting, but many other combinations are possible.

The proportion of list seats compared to total seats ranges widely; for example 30% in Taiwan, 37.5% in Japan and 68.7% in Armenia.

Under the most common form of parallel voting, a portion of seats in the legislature are filled by the single-member first-preference plurality method (FPP), while others are filled by proportional representation. Parallel voting can use other systems besides FPP, and can have any mixture of winner-take-all, semi-proportional, and proportional components. For this reason, parallel voting is not always mixed-member majoritarian. For example, parallel voting may use a two proportional systems like STV and list-PR and then it would not be mixed-member majoritarian, and a majority bonus system (which is not the same as parallel voting) may also be considered mixed majoritarian. In addition, some mixed-member majoritarian systems are not parallel, in that they allow for compensation between the two components, for example this is the case in South Korea and Mexico.

== Advantages and disadvantages ==
=== Representation for smaller parties ===
The major critique of parallel systems is that they tend to be disproportional. Large parties can win very large majorities, disproportionate to their percentage vote.

Parallel voting systems allow smaller parties that cannot win individual elections to secure at least some representation in the legislature; however, unlike in a proportional system they will have a substantially smaller delegation than their share of the total vote. This is seen by advocates of proportional systems to be still unfair towards constituents of smaller parties. If there is also a threshold for list seats, parties which are too small to reach the threshold are unable to achieve any representation, unless they have a very strong base in certain constituencies to gain individual seats.

Those who favour majoritarian systems argue that supplementary seats allocated proportionally increases the chances that no party will receive a majority in an assembly, leading to minority or coalition governments. The largest parties may need to rely on the support of smaller ones in order to form a government. Those who favour proportional representation see this as an advantage as parties may not govern alone, but have to compromise.

=== Two types of representatives ===
Because voters have two votes, one for a constituency candidate and one for a list, there is a critique that two classes of representatives will emerge under a parallel voting system: with one class beholden to their electorate seat, and the other concerned only with their party. Some consider this as an advantage as local as well as national interests will be represented. Some prefer systems where every constituency and therefore every constituent has only one representative, while others prefer a system where every MP represents the electorate as a whole as this is reflected in the electoral system as well.

=== Compared to MMP and AMS ===
Parallel systems are often contrasted with mixed-member proportional systems (MMP) or the additional member system (AMS). The party is sure to elect the candidates at the top of its list, guaranteeing safe seats for the leadership. By contrast, under the MMP or AMS system a party that does well in the local seats will not need or receive any compensatory list seats, so the leadership might have to run in the local seats. Certain types of AMS can be made de facto parallel systems by tactical voting and parties using decoy lists, which (other) MMP systems generally prevent.

=== Strategic voting ===
Strategic voting is relevant under parallel voting with strategic voting in each of the parallel systems and contamination effects between the parallel systems. The FPP part incentivizes the formation of a two-party system. Parallel voting tends to create a dominant-party system. Smaller parties are still disadvantaged as the larger parties still predominate. Voters of smaller parties may tactically vote for candidates of larger parties to avoid wasting their constituency vote. Smaller parties close to the threshold may refrain from voting for their preferred party in favour of a larger party to avoid wasting their list vote as well.

A party that can gerrymander local districts can win more than its share of seats. So parallel systems need fair criteria to draw district boundaries. Under MMP a gerrymander can help a local candidate, but it rarely raises a major party’s share of seats, while under AMS the effects of gerrymandering are reduced by the compensation.

== Current use ==
Parallel voting is currently used in the following countries:

Country	Body	Members elected in constituencies			Members elected by proportional representation			Other members		
Country	Body	Total	%	System	Total	%	System	Total	System	%
Andorra	General Council	14	50%	PBV	14	50%	List PR			
Japan	House of Representatives	289	62%	FPTP	176	38%	List PR			
Japan	House of Councillors	148	60%	SNTV	100	40%	List PR			
Lithuania	Seimas	71	50%	TRS	70	50%	List PR (largest remainder method): open lists			
(Myanmar) Myanmar	Amyotha Hluttaw	84	37.5%	FPTP	84	37.5%	List PR	56	Military appointed	25%
(Mongolia) Mongolia	State Great Khural	78	62%	BPV	48	38%	List PR: closed lists			
(Nepal) Nepal	House of Representatives	165	60%	FPTP	110	40%	List PR: closed lists			
Philippines	House of Representatives	253	80%	FPTP	63	20%	List PR (Hare quota): closed lists			
Philippines	Bangsamoro Parliament	32	40%	FPTP	40	50%	List PR	8		10%
(Russia) Russian Federation	State Duma	225	50%	FPTP	225	50%	List PR (Hare quota): closed lists			
Senegal	National Assembly	112	68%	FPTP/PBV	53	32%	List PR (largest remainder method)			
Taiwan (Republic of China)	Legislative Yuan	73	65%	FPTP	34	30%	List PR	6	SNTV for indigenous seats	5%
Tajikistan	Assembly of Representatives	41	65%	TRS	22	35%	List PR			
Thailand	House of Representatives	400	80%	FPTP	100	20%	List PR			
(Zambia) Zambia	National Assembly	226	81%	FPTP	40	14%	List PR	14	Appointed members	5%

=== Philippines ===
The Philippines' electoral system for Congress is an exceptional case. Political parties running for party-list seats are legally required to be completely separate from those running in constituency seats. Furthermore, political parties are capped at 3 seats (out of 20% of seats, or about 60 seats). As a result, the mixed-member system utilized in the Philippines is not representative at all of the share of the vote that "normal" political parties obtain (even amongst mixed-member majoritarian systems), let alone for those in full proportional representation systems.

=== For countries with limited recognition ===
Country	Body	Members elected in constituencies			Members elected by proportional representation		
Country	Body	Total	%	System	Total	%	System
South Ossetia	Parliament	17	50%	FPTP	17	50%	List PR

=== For dependencies ===
Country	Body	Members elected in constituencies			Members elected by proportional representation			Other members		
Country	Body	Total	%	System	Total	%	System	Total	System	%
Realm of New Zealand	Niue Assembly	14	70%	FPTP	6	30%	Plurality block voting (BV)			
British overseas territories	Anguilla House of Assembly	7	54%	FPTP	4	31%	Plurality block voting (BV)	2	2 ex officio	15%
British overseas territories	Turks and Caicos Islands House of Assembly	10	48%	FPTP	5	24%	Plurality block voting (BV)	6	4 appointed, 2 ex officio	28%
British overseas territories	British Virgin Islands House of Assembly	9	60%	FPTP	4	27%	Plurality block voting (BV)	2	2 ex officio	13%

=== For subnational legislatures ===
Country	Body	Members elected in constituencies			Members elected by proportional representation		
Country	Body	Total	%	System	Total	%	System
Argentina	(Córdoba Province, Argentina) Legislature of Córdoba Province	26	37%	FPTP	44	63%	List PR
Argentina	(Río Negro Province) Legislature of Río Negro Province	24	52%	List PR	22	48%	List PR
Argentina	(San Juan Province, Argentina) Chamber of Deputies of San Juan	19	53%	FPTP	17	47%	List PR
Argentina	(Santa Cruz Province, Argentina) Chamber of Deputies of Santa Cruz	14	58%	FPTP	10	42%	List PR

== Former use ==
- Albania used parallel voting in the 1996 and 1997 elections (before switching to mixed-member proportional representation from 2001 to 2005).
- Argentina: Santiago del Estero Province (1997–2009)
- Armenia
- Azerbaijan's National Assembly (the Milli Məclis) had previously used an SM system in which 100 members were elected for five-year terms in single-seat constituencies and 25 were members were elected by proportional representation. Since the latest election Azerbaijan has returned to electing members from single-member constituencies. Due to the corruption present within Azerbaijan, the limited proportionality that SM was able to offer had little effect.
- Bulgaria (1990, 2009)
- Croatia (1993–2001)
- Egypt (2020)
- Georgia (1990–2024): Georgia initially used a two-round system for its constituency seats. Up until 2016, 73 seats out of 150 seats were allocated in constituencies. In the 2020 election, this number was reduced to 30 out of 150 as a result of the 2019 protests. By 2024, Georgia will switch to a fully proportional electoral system.
- Guinea
- Italy (1993–2005, with modifications)
- Kyrgyzstan (until 2025)
- North Macedonia (1998)
- Palestinian Authority (2005), for the next election, the system was changed to party-list proportional representation.
- South Korea: (1988-2024) National Assembly used parallel voting from 1988 to 2019. From 2019 to 2024, it uses a hybrid system of parallel voting and mixed-member proportional, with both compensatory seats (30) and supplementary seats (17).
- Ukraine: In the last elections to the Verkhovna Rada, a parallel voting system was used. 50% of seats are distributed under party lists with a 5% election threshold and 50% through first-past-the-post in single-member constituencies. The method of 50/50 mixed elections was used in the 2002, 2012, 2014 and 2019 elections; however, in 2006 and 2007, the elections were held under a proportional system only. According to the election law that became valid on 1 January 2020 the next election to the Verkhovna Rada again will be held under a proportional scheme.

=== Former proposals ===
In New Zealand, the Royal Commission on the Electoral System came concluded that parallel voting would be unable to overcome the shortcomings. The total seats won by a party would likely remain out of proportion to its share of votes—there would be a "considerable imbalance between share of the votes and share of the total seats"—and it would be unfair to minor parties (who would struggle to win constituency seats). In the indicative 1992 electoral referendum, parallel voting was one of four choices for an alternative electoral system (alongside MMP, AV and STV), but came last with only 5.5 percent of the vote. An overwhelming majority of voters supported MMP, as recommended by the Royal Commission, and the system was adopted after the 1993 electoral referendum. In another referendum in 2011, 57.77% of voters elected to keep current the MMP system. Among the 42.23% that voted to change to another system, a plurality (46.66%) preferred a return to the pre-1994 SMP system. Parallel voting was the second-most popular choice, with 24.14% of the vote.

== Sources ==
- Gallagher, Michael (2011). "Elections and Referendums". In Caramani, Daniele (ed.). Comparative Politics (2nd ed.). Oxford: Oxford University Press. pp. 181–197. ISBN 978-0-19-957497-1.
- ——— (2014). "Electoral Institutions and Representation". In LeDuc, Lawrence; Niemi, Richard G.; Norris, Pippa (eds.). Comparing Democracies: Elections and Voting in a Changing World (4th ed.). SAGE Publications. ISBN 978-1-4739-0508-5.
