= Royal Commission on the Electoral System =

New Zealand government inquiry (1985–1986)

The Royal Commission on the Electoral System was formed in New Zealand in 1985 and reported in 1986. The decision to form the Royal Commission was taken by the Fourth Labour government, after the Labour Party had received more votes, yet it won fewer seats than the National Party in both the 1978 and 1981 elections. It was also a reaction to the power displayed by Prime Minister Robert Muldoon, whose action of illegally abolishing the Superannuation scheme in 1975 without any repercussions highlighted the need to distribute power in a more democratic way. The Royal Commission's report Towards a Better Democracy was instrumental in effecting New Zealand to change its electoral system from first-past-the-post to mixed member proportional.

== Membership ==
The Royal Commission consisted of

1. The Hon. Justice John Wallace QC (Chairman)
2. John Darwin
3. Kenneth Keith
4. Richard Mulgan
5. Whetumarama Wereta (Māori representative)

== Criteria ==
The Royal Commission established ten criteria for choosing an electoral system. The criteria were not weighed equally by the commission, and a balance was sought.

1. Fairness between political parties

The number of seats in the House should roughly reflect the number of votes received

2. Effective representation of minority and special interest groups

The membership of Parliament should reflect the divisions of society

3. Effective Māori representation

Māori should be fairly and effectively represented in House
Treaty of Waitangi & aboriginal rights should be respected

4. Political Integration

All groups should respect views taken by others in society

5. Effective representation of constituents

An electoral system should encourage close links and accountability to the community

6. Effective voter participation

The voting system should be understandable
Power should be hands of voters to make/unmake governments

7. Effective government

Governments should be able to act decisively and fulfil their responsibilities to their voters

8. Effective Parliament

Parliament should be independent from government control
Parliament should be able to authorise spending and taxation as well as legislate

9. Effective parties

Political parties should be formulating policy and providing representation

10. Legitimacy

Fair and reasonable to the community

The Commission evaluated first-past-the-post, single transferable vote, Supplementary Member, Alternative Vote and mixed member proportional.

== Recommendations ==
1. The Commission unanimously recommended the adoption of mixed member proportional, with a threshold of 4% and that a referendum be held before or at the 1987 election.
2. They also recommended that the Māori electorates be abolished, with Māori parties instead receiving representation if they did not pass the threshold.
3. That the number of MPs raise to 120 (although they considered 140 would be ideal, they realised that it would receive too much public backlash).
4. The term of Parliament be raised to four years.
5. The Commission recommended that citizens initiated referendums not be implemented. However, they were in 1993.

== Implementation ==
In 1992 and 1993, two referendums were held, resulting in the adoption of MMP. The threshold was changed to 5% and the Māori electorates were retained instead of allowing Māori parties to avoid the threshold. The number of MPs was increased to 120.

A referendum was held on increasing the term of Parliament to four years in 1990. It failed to pass; Parliament continues operating under a three-year term.

== See also ==
- Electoral reform in New Zealand
- Electoral system of New Zealand
- Royal Commission on the Electoral System, Report of the Royal Commission on the Electoral System: Towards a Better Democracy, Wellington: Government Printers, 1986
- Citizens' Assembly on Electoral Reform (British Columbia)
