= Don't throw the baby out with the bathwater =

Idiomatic expression

"Don't throw the baby out with the bathwater" is an idiomatic expression for an avoidable error in which one eliminates something good or of value while trying to get rid of something unwanted.

A slightly different explanation suggests this flexible catchphrase has to do with discarding the essential while retaining the superfluous because of excessive zeal.

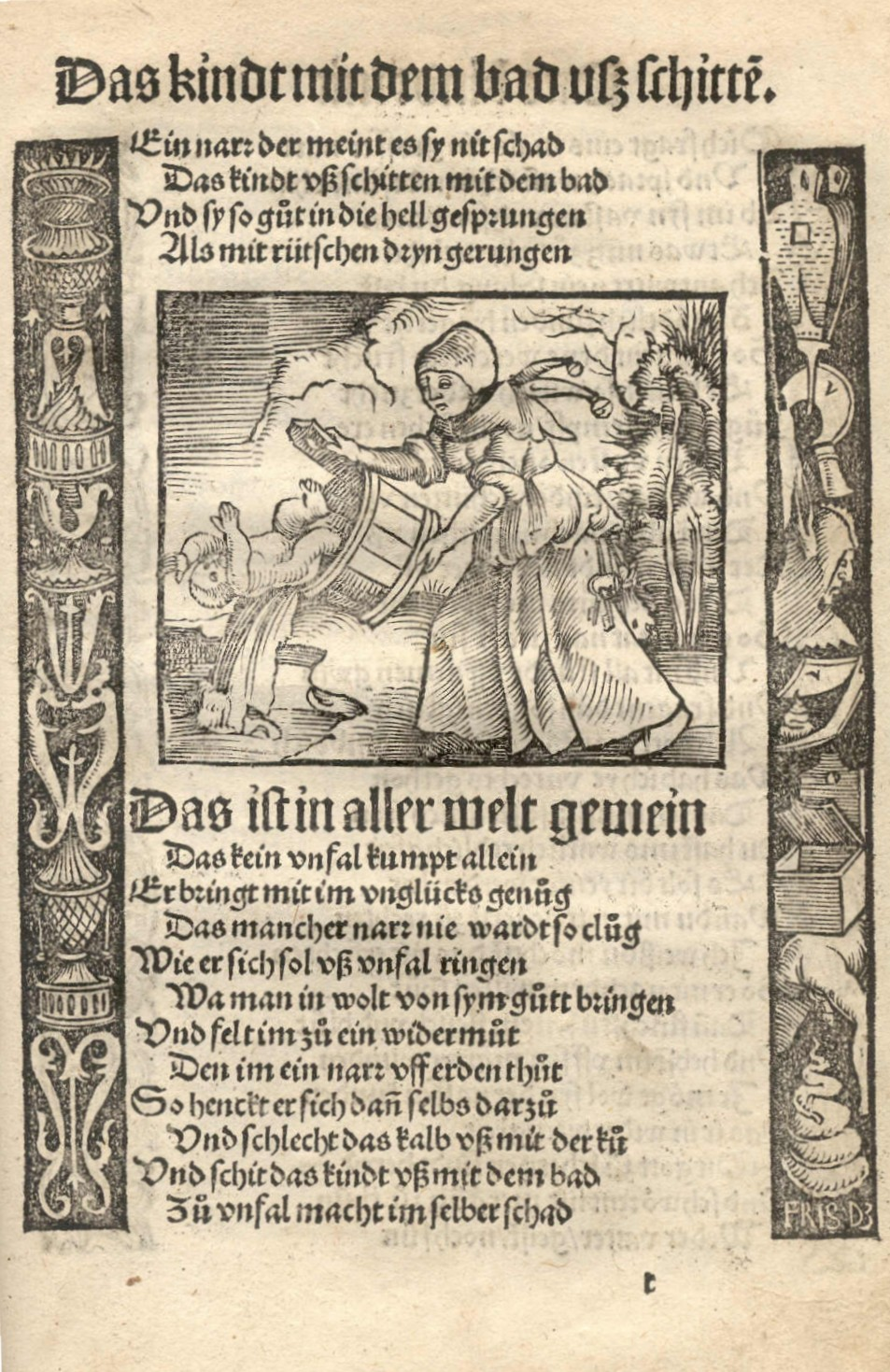
refer to adjacent text

== History ==
This idiom derives from a German proverb, das Kind mit dem Bade ausschütten. The earliest record of this phrase is in 1512, in Narrenbeschwörung (Appeal to Fools) by Thomas Murner, which includes a woodcut illustration showing a woman tossing a baby out with waste water. It is a common catchphrase in German, with examples of its use in work by Martin Luther, Johannes Kepler, Johann Wolfgang von Goethe, Otto von Bismarck, Thomas Mann, and Günter Grass.

Thomas Carlyle adapted the concept in an 1849 essay on slavery:

And if true, it is important for us, in reference to this Negro Question and some others. The Germans say, "you must empty-out the bathing-tub, but not the baby along with it." Fling-out your dirty water with all zeal, and set it careening down the kennels; but try if you can keep the little child!

Carlyle is urging his readers to join in the struggle to end slavery, but he also encourages them to be mindful of the need to try to avoid harming the enslaved persons in the process.

== Alternative expressions ==
The meaning and intent of the English idiomatic expression is sometimes presented in different terms.

- Throw out the champagne with the cork
- Empty the baby out with the bath
