= Reform New Zealand =

Former political party in New Zealand

Reform New Zealand was a centre-right liberal conservative or classical liberal political party in New Zealand. The party was established in 2011 by dissatisfied members of ACT New Zealand, and advocates of similar policies of low taxation, privatisation, and reduced government. The party never registered on any opinion polls, named its party leadership, or confirmed its organisational details. While claiming that it planned to contest the 2011 election it never attempted to register with the Electoral Commission and did not stand any candidates.

It listed its policies as opposition to the current Key administration's seabed and foreshore compromise legislation which was designed to placate National's alternative coalition partner, the Māori Party; restoration of the Employment Contracts Act anti-union industrial relations legislation of the nineties; climate change denial; and sharp reduction in public sector employment through asset sale privatisation, as well as reduction of social welfare expenditure.

== See also ==
- ACT New Zealand
