= 1967 New Zealand parliamentary term referendum =

Referendum held in New Zealand

A referendum on the length of the term of Parliament was held in New Zealand on 23 September 1967. Voters were asked whether they approved of extending the term from three to four years. The change was rejected by 68.1% of voters, with a turnout of 69.7%.

The referendum was held in conjunction with a licensing hours referendum.

== Background ==
Prior to the referendum the length of the term of Parliament had changed multiple times since the first general election of 1853. Initially set at five years per term in the New Zealand Constitution Act 1852, the term length changed to three years in 1879, and during both World Wars the term was extended on a provisional basis, but proved to be unpopular with the electorate.

The referendum did not gain significant public attention, largely because of the licensing hours referendum that was happening at the same time.

This referendum was non-binding, so if a majority of voters supported the proposed measures, then Parliament would have had to vote on it. As the term of Parliament is an entrenched clause in the New Zealand constitution, 75% of MPs would have had to vote for it.

== Results ==
Choice	Votes	%
Three years	678,960	68.10
Four years	317,973	31.90
Total	996,933	100.00
Registered voters/turnout	1,430,320	–
Source: Nohlen et al.

== See also ==
- 1990 New Zealand parliamentary term referendum
