= Electoral Act 1993 =

Act of Parliament in New Zealand

New Zealand Parliament
- Long title: An Act to reform the electoral system and to provide, in particular, if the proposal for the introduction of the mixed member proportional system is carried at the referendum held under the Electoral Referendum Act 1993,— (a) for the introduction of the mixed member proportional system of representation in relation to the House of Representatives; (b) for the establishment of an Electoral Commission; (c) for the repeal of the Electoral Act 1956

Related legislation
- Broadcasting Act 1989; Electoral (Integrity) Amendment Act 2018
- Status: Current legislation

The Electoral Act 1993 is an Act of the New Zealand Parliament for regulating elections in New Zealand.

== Legislative framework ==
It "establishes the electoral agencies, electoral system, election processes (including that for disputing results), how MPs are replaced between elections, registration processes for political parties and logos, enrolment and electoral roll requirements, and provides for the Māori Electoral option, and the Representation Commission." One such agency is the Electoral Commission which is responsible, among other things, for the administration of parliamentary elections and referendums.

The Electoral Act forms part of the constitution of New Zealand. The regulations made under the Act contain most of New Zealand's electoral legislation. The Act defined mixed-member proportional (MMP) representation for use in the 1993 electoral referendum, and it established MMP as the electoral system for the 1996 general election.

== Amendments ==
On 16 December 2025, the Sixth National Government passed Electoral Amendment Act 2025 amending the Electoral Act 1993 to end voter enrolment 13 days before the election, ban sentenced prisoners from voting, allow larger anonymous political donations, and ban food distribution near polling booths.

== See also ==
- Broadcasting Standards Authority
- 2005 New Zealand election funding controversy
- New Zealand Electoral Commission
- Constitution Act 1986 § Entrenchment
