= Chief Electoral Officer =

The Chief Electoral Officer is the person responsible for overseeing elections in some commonwealth countries and provinces, and may refer to:

- Chief Electoral Officer (India)
  - Chief Electoral Officer of Uttar Pradesh
- Chief Electoral Officer (New Zealand)
- Chief Electoral Officer for Northern Ireland
- Chief Electoral Officer (Canada)
  - Chief Electoral Officer of Quebec
  - Chief Electoral Officer of New Brunswick
- Chief Electoral Officer (New Zealand)
- Chief Electoral Officer for Northern Ireland
- Chief Electoral Officer of South Africa
