= Elections in New Zealand =

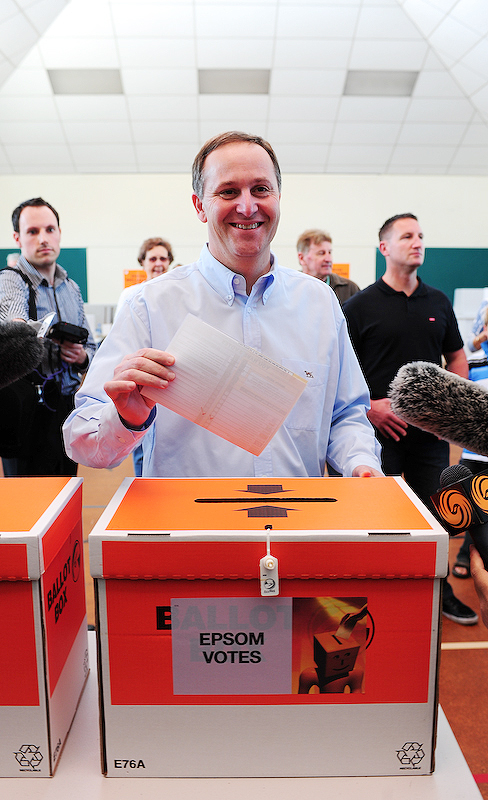
John Key placing his ballot in the ballot box for the Epsom electorate

New Zealand is a representative democracy in which members of the unicameral New Zealand Parliament gain their seats through elections. General elections are usually held every three years; they may be held at an earlier date (a "snap" election) at the discretion of the prime minister (advising the governor-general), but that usually only happens in the event of a vote of no confidence or other exceptional circumstances. A by-election is held to fill an electorate vacancy arising during a parliamentary term. Election day is always a Saturday, but advance voting is allowed in the lead-up to it. The most recent general election took place on 7 November 2026.

New Zealand has a multi-party system due to proportional representation. The introduction of the mixed-member proportional (MMP) voting system in 1993 was the most significant change to the electoral system in the 20th century. The Electoral Commission is responsible for the administration of parliamentary elections. The introduction of MMP has led to mostly minority or coalition governments, but the first party to win an outright majority since the introduction of MMP was the Labour Party, led by Jacinda Ardern, in 2020.

Local government politicians, including mayors and councillors, are voted in during local elections, held every three years. Most of these elections use the first-past-the-post (FPP) voting system, however, at the last local elections in 2022, 15 councils used the single transferable vote (STV) system, which has increasingly been adopted by councils since the 2000s.

== Overview of elections ==
=== History ===
The first general and provincial elections in New Zealand took place in 1853, the year after the British Parliament passed the New Zealand Constitution Act 1852. Women's suffrage was introduced in 1893, with New Zealand being the first modern country to do so.

Almost all general elections between 1853 and 1993 were held under the first-past-the-post voting system. The first election under the mixed-member proportional (MMP) system was held in 1996 following the 1993 electoral referendum.

=== Electoral roll ===
The electoral roll consists of a register of all enrolled voters, organised (primarily alphabetically by surname) within electorates. All persons who meet the requirements for voting must by law register on the electoral roll, even if they do not intend to vote. Although eligible voters must be enrolled, voting in New Zealand elections is not compulsory.

To be eligible to enrol, a person must be 18 years or older, a New Zealand citizen or non-citizen "resident for electoral purposes" that "has at some time resided continuously in New Zealand for a period of not less than 1 year" according to the Electoral Act 1993 and Electoral Amendment Act 2025. People can provisionally enrol to vote once they turn 17, with them being automatically enrolled on their 18th birthday.

The Registrar of Births Deaths and Marriages automatically notifies a person's death to the Electoral Commission so they may be removed from the roll. An enrolment update campaign is conducted prior to every local and general election in order to keep the roll up to date, identifying any voters who have failed to update their address or cannot be found.

The roll records the name, address and stated occupation of all voters, although individual electors can apply for "unpublished" status on the roll in special circumstances, such as when having their details printed in the electoral roll could threaten their personal safety. The roll is "public information" meaning it can be used for legitimate purposes such as selecting people for jury service but it can be abused especially by marketing companies who use the electoral roll to send registered voters unsolicited advertising mail. According to Elections New Zealand, "having the printed electoral rolls available for the public to view is a part of the open democratic process of New Zealand". The Electoral Commission, in their report on the 2017 general election, recommended that roll sales be discontinued for anything other than electoral purposes.

=== Electorates and lists ===
Map of electorates at the 2026 general election

New Zealanders refer to electoral districts as "electorates", or more colloquially as "seats". Since the 2020 general election, there are 72 electorates, including seven Māori electorates reserved for people of Māori ethnicity or ancestry who choose to place themselves on a separate electoral roll. All of New Zealand is covered by a general electorate and an overlapping Māori electorate. According to the New Zealand Electoral Commission, "The Representation Commission reviews and adjusts electorate boundaries after each 5-yearly population census and the Māori Electoral Option."

All electorates have roughly the same number of people in them; the Representation Commission periodically reviews and alters electorate boundaries to preserve this approximate balance. The number of people per electorate depends on the population of the South Island, which as the less populous of the country's two main islands has sixteen guaranteed electorates. Hence, the ideal number of people per electorate equals the population of the South Island divided by sixteen. From this, the Commission determines the number of North Island, Māori and list seats, which may fluctuate accordingly. The number of electorates increased by one compared to the 2017 election to account for the North Island's higher population growth, creating Takanini; and the boundaries of 30 general electorates and five Māori electorates were adjusted.

Supplementing the geographic electorate seats, the system currently allows for 48 at-large "list seats". A nationwide party vote fills these seats from closed lists submitted by political parties; they serve to make a party's total share of seats in parliament reflect its share of the party vote. For example, if a party wins 20% of the party vote, but only ten electorate seats, it will win fourteen list-seats, so that it has a total of 24 seats: 20% of the 120 seats in parliament. (See Electoral system of New Zealand § MMP.)

=== Timing of elections ===
==== General elections ====
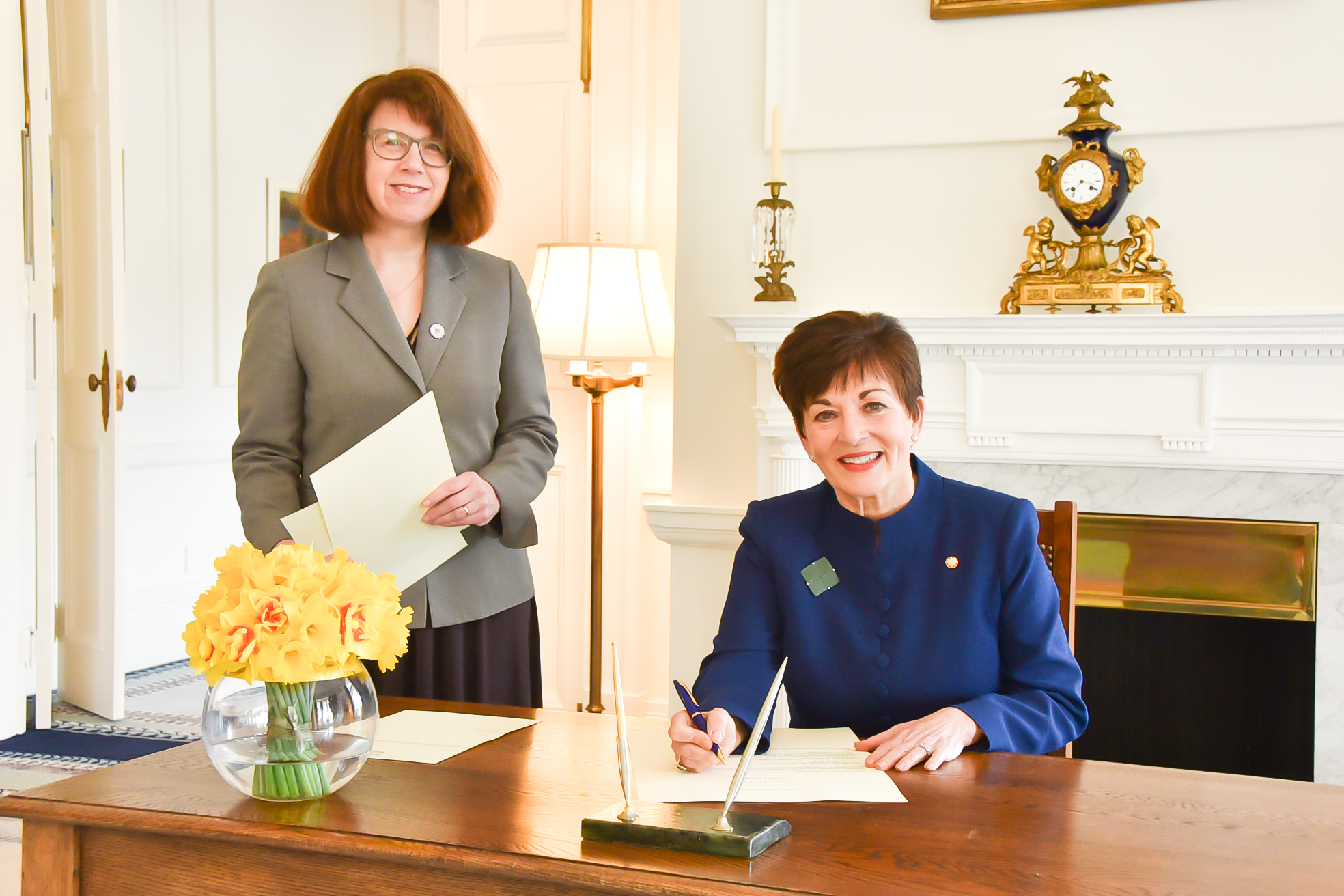
Governor-General Dame Patsy Reddy signs the writ for the 2020 general election

Unlike some other countries, New Zealand has no fixed election-date for general elections, but rather the prime minister determines the timing of general elections by advising the governor-general when to issue the writ for a general election. The Constitution Act 1986 requires new parliamentary elections every three years. The 1910s, 1930s and 1940s saw three elections delayed due to World War I, the Great Depression and World War II, respectively: the 1919, 1935 and 1943 elections would otherwise have taken place in 1917, 1934 and 1941 (Parliaments passed acts extending their terms). Also, governments have occasionally called early, or "snap" elections (for example, in 1951 in the midst of an industrial dispute involving striking waterfront workers).

The term of Parliament and the timing of general elections is set out in the Constitution Act 1986 and the Electoral Act 1993. Under section 19 of the Constitution Act, Parliament must meet within six weeks of the return of the writ for a general election, while under section 17, the term of Parliament ends three years after the return of the writ, unless Parliament is dissolved earlier by the governor-general. Section 125 of the Electoral Act requires that whenever Parliament expires or is dissolved, the governor-general must issue a writ of election within seven days. Section 139 of the Electoral Act provides further constraints. The writ must be returned within 50 days of being issued, though the governor-general may appoint an earlier return date in the writ itself. Furthermore, election day must be between 20 and 27 days after the close of nominations. Thus, New Zealand law specifically mandates elections at least once every three years and two months, though elections are often held after three years, traditionally in November. The extra two months allow for some flexibility when returning to a fourth-quarter election after an early election, as happened in 2005 and 2008 after the 2002 snap election.

Snap elections have occurred three times in New Zealand's history: in 1951, 1984 and 2002. Early elections often provoke controversy, as they potentially give governing parties an advantage over opposition candidates. Of the three elections in which the government won an increased majority, two were snap elections (1951 and 2002 – the other incumbent-boosting election took place in 1938). The 1984 snap election backfired on the governing party: many believe that Prime Minister Robert Muldoon called it while drunk. The 1996 election took place slightly early (on 12 October) to avoid holding a by-election after the resignation of Michael Laws.

As in other Westminster-style democracies, the prime minister's power to determine the election date can give the government some subtle advantages. For example, if the prime minister determines a section of the population will either vote against their government or not at all, they might hold the election at the most advantageous time – as long as it is within three years. Party strategists take the timing of important rugby union matches into account, partly because a major match in the same weekend of the election will likely lower voting-levels, and partly because of a widespread belief that incumbent governments benefit from a surge of national pride when the All Blacks (the New Zealand national rugby team) win, and suffer when they lose.

Throughout the late 20th century and beginning of the 21st century, tradition associated elections with November – give or take a few weeks. After disruptions to the 36-month cycle, prime ministers moved to restore it to a November base. In 1950, the legal requirement to hold elections on a Saturday was introduced, and this first applied to the 1951 election. Beginning with the 1957 election, a convention was formed to hold general elections on the last Saturday of November. This convention was upset by Muldoon calling a snap election in 1984. It took until the 1999 election to get back towards the convention, only for Helen Clark to call an early election in 2002. By the 2011 election, the conventional "last Saturday of November" was achieved again. From the 2014 election, the trend has been to hold the election in September or October; the 2020 election, delayed from September to October due to the COVID-19 pandemic, caused the 2023 election to also be held in October. The date chosen for the 2026 election was 7 November.

==== Local elections ====
Unlike general elections, elections for the city, district and regional councils of New Zealand have a fixed election date. Under section 10 of the Local Electoral Act 2001, elections must be held on the "second Saturday in October in every third year" from the date the Act came into effect in 2001. The latest local body elections were held on 11 October 2025.

=== Nomination and deposit of political parties and candidates ===
A party that has more than 500 fee-paying members may register with the Electoral Commission. Registered parties may submit a party list on payment of a $1000 deposit. This deposit is refunded if the party reaches 0.5% of the party votes. Electorate candidates may be nominated by a registered party or by two voters in that electorate. The deposit for an electorate candidate is $300 which is refunded if they reach 5%.

=== Voting ===
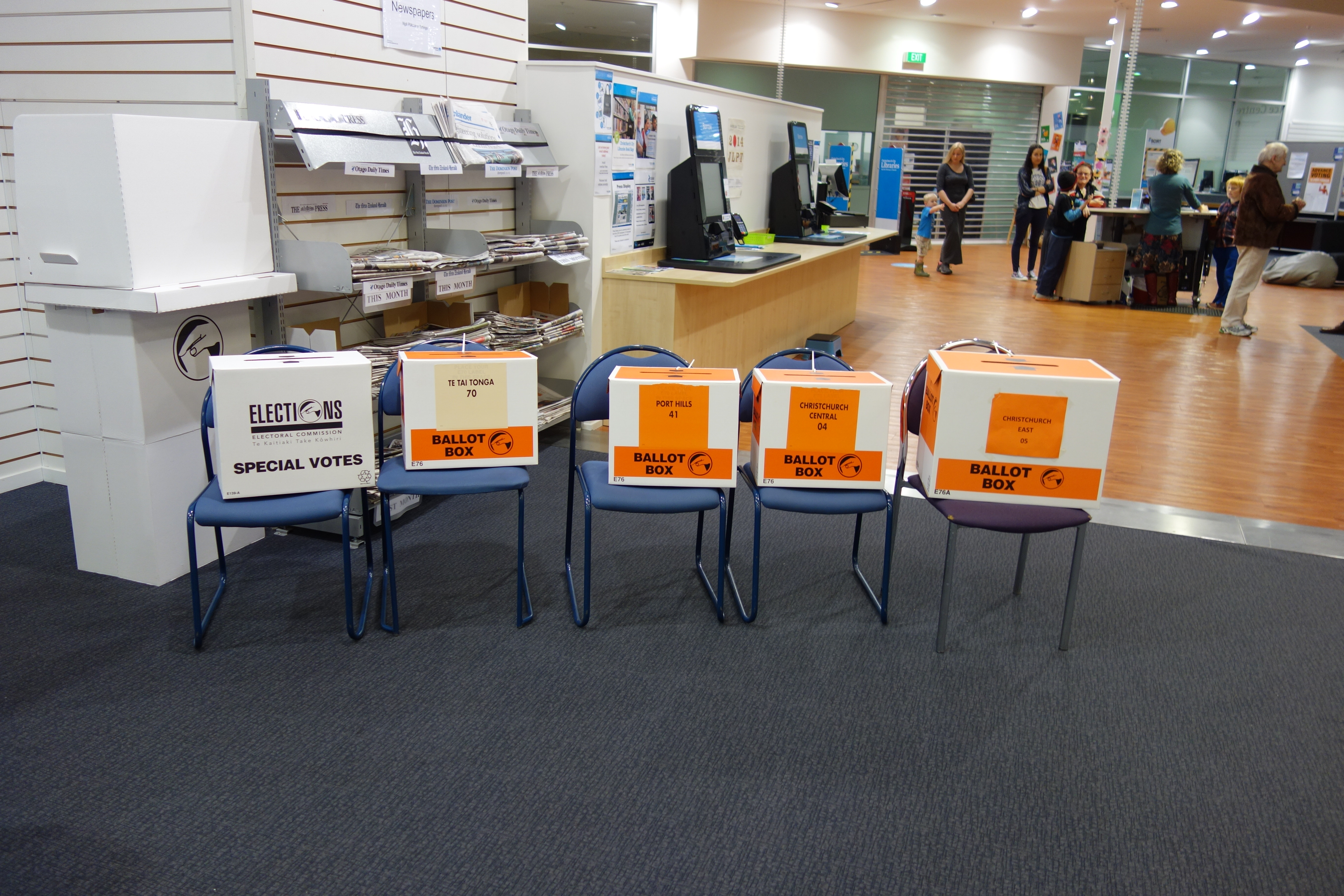
Ballot boxes at the Linwood Library, Christchurch, for the 2014 election. The white leftmost box is for special votes, with the orange boxes being for ordinary votes for the (from left to right) Te Tai Tonga, Port Hills, Christchurch Central and Christchurch East electorates. A voting screen can be seen to the left.

Election day for both Māori and general seats has been held on a Saturday since 1951, so as to minimise the effect of work or religious commitments that could inhibit people from voting. The casting of ballots happens at various voting places, generally established in schools, church halls, sports clubs, or other such public places. In some elections, voting booths are also set up in hospitals and rest homes for use by patients (though this did not happen in the 2020 election because of the COVID-19 pandemic). Voters have the flexibility of voting any voting place in the country, regardless of the electorate they live in. Some voting places may have electoral rolls of multiple electorates to assist voters, but if the voting place does not have the correct electoral roll then a voter will have to cast a special vote.

Advance voting is available in the two weeks before election day. A dominating feature of the 2017 election was the increased use of advance voting; 47% of the votes were taken in advance and grew from 24% in the 2014 election. In previous elections, voters were required to provide reasons to vote in advance; from 2011 and beyond, voters could use this service for any reason. The 2018 Northcote by-election was the first parliamentary election where more people voted in advance than on election day. In the 2020 election, 68% of votes were cast in advance – an increase of about 60% compared to the previous general election, likely driven by the COVID-19 pandemic's impact on people's ability to vote in person.

If voters cannot physically get to a voting place, they may authorise another person to collect their ballot for them. Overseas voters may vote by post, fax, internet, or in person at New Zealand embassies or high commissions. Disabled voters can choose to vote via a telephone dictation service.

Sample of an EasyVote card

Enrolled voters are sent an EasyVote pack by post after nominations close. The pack contains an EasyVote card, which has the voter's name, address and location on the electoral roll (electorate, page number and line number), which the voter gives to the issuing officer to assist in finding the voter on the printed electoral roll. The EasyVote Card is optional, and voters can simply state their name and address to the issuing officer. The EasyVote pack also contains a list of candidates in the voter's electorate, a copy of the party lists, a list of voting places for the voter's electorate and their opening hours, and a brochure on how to vote and the MMP voting system.

After their name is marked off, the voter is issued a voting paper. The voter then goes behind a cardboard screen, where they mark their paper using a supplied orange ink pen. The voter then folds their paper and places in their electorate's sealed ballot box. Voters who enrol after the rolls have been printed, voting outside their electorate, or on the unpublished roll casts a special vote which is separated for later counting.

According to a 2008 survey commissioned by the Electoral Commission, 71% of voters voted in less than 5 minutes and 92% in less than 10 minutes. 98% of voters are satisfied with the waiting time.

New Zealand has a strictly enforced election silence. Campaigning is prohibited on election day and all election advertisements must be removed or covered by midnight on the night before the election. Opinion polling is also illegal on election day.

Local elections are held by postal vote. Referendums held in conjunction with elections are held at voting places; those between elections may be done by post or at voting places at the Government's discretion.

==== Voting in the MMP system ====
Each voter gets a party vote, where they choose a political party, and an electorate vote, where they vote for a candidate in their electorate. The party vote determines the proportion of seats assigned to each party in Parliament, as long the party meets the electoral threshold. Each elected candidate gets a seat, and the remaining seats are filled by the party from its party list.

For example: a party wins 30% of the party vote. Therefore, it will get 30% of the 120 seats in Parliament (roughly 36 seats). The party won 20 electorates through the electorate vote. Therefore, 20 of the 36 seats will be taken by the MPs that won their electorate, and 16 seats will be left over for the party to fill from their list of politicians.

=== Vote-counting and announcement ===
Voting places close at 7:00 pm on election day and each place counts the votes cast there. The process of counting the votes by hand begins with advance and early votes from 9:00 am. From 7:00 pm, results (at this stage, provisional ones) go to a central office in Wellington, where they are recorded in a spreadsheet and entered into the national election results system. Election results are published on ElectionResults.govt.nz as they arrive, and simultaneously shared with the media, with the goal of having 50% of results available by 10 p.m. and 95% by 11:30 p.m.

All voting papers, counterfoils and electoral rolls are returned to the respective electorate's returning officer for a mandatory recount. A master roll is compiled from the booth rolls to ensure no voter has voted more than once. At this stage, special votes, which can be returned up to 10 days after election day, are counted in the electorate they were cast for and included in the official count. The final count, including special votes, can take up to three weeks to be completed and announced. It becomes official when confirmed by the Chief Electoral Officer.

The final results sometimes differ from the preliminary results meaningfully; special votes tend to favour parties on the left, leaving parties on the right with one or two seats fewer than in the preliminary results. In 1999 the provisional result indicated that neither the Greens nor New Zealand First would qualify for Parliament, but both parties qualified on the strength of special votes, and the major parties ended up with fewer list seats than expected.

Candidates and parties have three working days after the release of the official results to apply for a judicial recount, either of individual electorates or of all electorates (a nationwide recount). A judicial recount takes place under the auspices of a District Court judge; a nationwide recount must take place under the auspices of the Chief District Court Judge. At the 2023 election, recounts were requested in the Mount Albert and Tāmaki Makaurau electorates, after the top two candidates in each were separated by fewer than 50 votes.

== Voter turnout ==
Voter turnout in New Zealand, 1879 to 2023

Voter turnout has generally declined in New Zealand general elections since the mid-20th century. Concerns about declining democratic engagement and participation have been raised by the Electoral Commission, and by commentators such as Sir Geoffrey Palmer and Andrew Butler, leading some to support the introduction of compulsory voting, as exists in Australia. A system of compulsory voting looks unlikely to manifest in the near future, with former Prime Minister Jacinda Ardern arguing that it is an ineffective way to foster citizen engagement.

In its report after the 2014 election, the Electoral Commission stated:

Turnout has been in decline in most developed democracies over the last 30 years, but New Zealand's decline has been particularly steep and persistent. At the 2011 election, turnout as a percentage of those eligible to enrol dropped to 69.57 per cent, the lowest recorded at a New Zealand Parliamentary election since the adoption of universal suffrage in 1893. The 2014 result, 72.14 per cent, is the second lowest. This small increase, while welcome, is no cause for comfort. New Zealand has a serious problem with declining voter participation.

Of particular concern has been the youth vote (referring to the group of voters aged 18–29), which has had significantly lower turnout than other age brackets. A graph published on the Electoral Commission's website demonstrates the lower turnout in younger age groups. Those from poorer and less educated demographics also fail to vote at disproportionately high rates.

== Orange Guy ==
Orange Guy mascot

"Orange Guy" is the mascot used in electoral related advertising by the Electoral Commission. He is an amorphous orange blob who usually takes on a human form, but can transform into any object as the situation warrants. His face is a smiley, and his chest sports the logo of the Electoral Commission. Since 2017 he has been voiced by stand-up comedian David Correos. In the 2020 general election campaign, he was joined by a dog, Pup, who is also orange and resembles a cross between a Jack Russell Terrier and a Dachshund. The Orange Guy icon is trademarked to the Electoral Commission.

== Leaders' debates ==
Leaders' debates are televised during pre-election periods in New Zealand. Traditionally these were held between the leaders of the two major parties, but since 1996, all leaders of parties with parliamentary representation are invited to a televised debate, still the two main party leaders may debate one-on-one in a separate debate. These events can prove decisive. For instance, at the 2002 election the United Future party boosted its rating in opinion polls following the successful performance of its party leader during a televised debate.

== See also ==
- Next New Zealand general election
- Electoral reform in New Zealand
- Political funding in New Zealand
- Politics of New Zealand
- Voting rights of prisoners in New Zealand

Lists of elections

- List of New Zealand by-elections
- List of parliaments of New Zealand, including election result statistics
- Local elections in New Zealand
- Referendums in New Zealand
