= Chief Electoral Office (New Zealand) =

Government office

The Chief Electoral Office of New Zealand was a government office that was responsible for conducting general elections, by-elections and referendums. It was disestablished in 2010 and replaced with the New Zealand Electoral Commission.

The Chief Electoral Officer is now ex officio the chief executive of the New Zealand Electoral Commission.

== History ==
The Chief Electoral Office was part of the Ministry of Justice. Along with the previous Electoral Commission and the Electoral Enrolment Centre managed by New Zealand Post, it was one of three government bodies charged with overseeing elections.

The duties of the Chief Electoral Office included employing returning officers for New Zealand's electorates (the boundaries of which were drawn every five years by a fourth electoral body, the Representation Commission). The Office also received returns of donations and election expenses from parliamentary candidates, and provided information to voters, candidates and parties relating to electoral events.

=== Disestablishment ===
The Electoral (Administration) Amendment Bill was passed in 2010 and established a new independent Electoral Commission which took over the responsibilities of the Chief Electoral Office and the previous Electoral Commission. The Chief Electoral Officer of the Chief Electoral Office, Robert Peden (who had served in this role since 2006), was appointed to be the first Chief Electoral Officer of the new Electoral Commission.

== See also ==
- Electoral Commission (New Zealand)
