= Electoral Amendment Act 2025 =

Act of Parliament in New Zealand

New Zealand Parliament
- Royal assent: 18 December 2025

Legislative history
- Introduced by: Paul Goldsmith
- First reading: 29 July 2025
- Second reading: 9 December 2025
- Third reading: 16 December 2025
- Passed: 16 December 2025

Related legislation
- Electoral Act 1993
- Status: Current legislation

The Electoral Amendment Act 2025 is a New Zealand Act of Parliament that amends the Electoral Act 1993 ahead of the 2026 New Zealand general election. Its key provisions include ending same-day voter enrolment, banning prisoners from voting, allowing larger anonymous political donations, and banning food distribution near polling booths. The Act passed its third reading on 16 December 2025, and received royal assent on 18 December. The law change was supported by the governing National, ACT and New Zealand First parties but was opposed by the opposition Labour, Green parties, and Te Pāti Māori.

== Key provisions ==
The Electoral Amendment Act 2025 amends the Electoral Act 1993 by changing the criteria for voter registration, advance voting, the nomination of candidates and parties, and election treating. It also amends other laws including the Juries Act 1981 and the Electoral Regulations 1996.

=== Voter registration ===
The Act limits voter registration up to 13 days before polling day for the election; reversing the previous policy of same-day enrolments on polling day. While the minimum age for voter registration remains 18 years, the Act disqualifies all people detained in hospitals, secure facilities and prisons at the time of the election from voting. While people serving sentences under three years were previously allowed to vote, the Electoral Amendment Act 2025 explicitly disqualifies them from enrolling. The Act also requires the Director of Mental Health and prison managers to provide the Electoral Commission with information about disqualified electors.

In terms of voter registration information, the Act widens the criteria for voter registration to include the person's contact details including email addresses and phone numbers. The Electoral Commission may also seek the consent of Māori voters to supply information about their names, postal and residential addresses, age and ethnicity.

=== Advanced voting ===
The Electoral Amendment Act 2025 defines the advanced polling period as the 12-day consecutive period leading up to polling day. The Act also provides criteria for shortening or extending the advanced voting period due to unforeseen and unavoidable disruptions.

=== Offences ===
The Act amends the criteria for offences under the Electoral Act 1993 including bribery, treating and undue influence. The Act defines treating as supplying food, drink, entertainment, and other things for the purposes of encouraging a person to vote or refrain from voting, refrain from registering as a voter, and for the purpose of procuring someone's vote for a candidate or party. The Act also explicitly bans people from providing food, drinks excluding water, and entertainment including music around any polling places for the duration of the polling period.

=== Miscellaneous provisions ===
The Act also outlines the criteria for expenditure limits, the Electoral Commission's membership, by-elections, party registration, candidate nominations and election scrutineers. It also ensures that Māori voters are allowed to switch between the general and Māori electoral rolls three months leading up to polling day. The Act also raises the limit for the annual return of party donations from NZ$5,000 to NZ$6,000.

== History ==
=== Background ===
On 30 April 2025, the Justice Minister Paul Goldsmith confirmed that the Government would introduce legislation to reinstate a blanket ban on prisoners voting, describing it as a reversal of the previous Sixth Labour Government's "soft on crime" policy. Goldsmith said that the New Zealand Cabinet had decided to disregard a High Court ruling and recommendations from both the Electoral Commission and Waitangi Tribunal that prisoners be allowed to vote. In response, the opposition Labour, Green parties and Te Pāti Māori described the government's plan to strip prisoners of voting rights as a violation of human rights, counterproductive to rehabilitation and discriminatory against Māori people. By contrast, the conservative justice advocacy group Sensible Sentencing Trust's spokesperson Louise Parsons welcomed the government's announcement, saying that prisoners had lost their rights to be a part of "functioning society" due to their crimes.

=== Introduction ===
On 24 July 2025, Goldsmith confirmed that the Government would introduce new electoral amendment legislation. Key provisions include closing voter enrolment 13 days before election day, setting a 12-day advance voting period, automatic enrolment updates, removing the postal requirements for enrolment. The Government also intends to ban free food, drink or entertainment within 100 metres of a voting place (subject to a NZ$10,000 fine). In addition, the Government intends to ban all prisoners from voting and will raise the donation threshold from NZ$5,000 to NZ$6,000. In response, Labour's justice spokesperson Duncan Webb expressed disagreement with the Government's plan to eliminate voter enrolment on election day as an invalid reason for restricting the number of people able to exercise their democratic right to vote. The Bill passed its first reading on 29 July 2025 and was referred to the New Zealand Parliament's justice select committee that same day.

=== Select committee ===
The justice select committee issued a call for public submissions on the bill until 11 September 2025. The committee's membership consisted of chairperson and National MP Andrew Bayly, fellow National MPs Carl Bates, Rima Nakhle, Tom Rutherford, Labour MP Ginny Andersen, Vanushi Walters, Duncan Webb, NZ First MP Jamie Arbuckle, former Te Pāti Māori MP Tākuta Ferris, ACT MP Todd Stephenson, and Green MPs Lawrence Xu-Nan and Celia Wade-Brown. The committee received a total of 2,078 submissions from various individuals and groups. They also heard 98 oral submissions via video conference and in Wellington. On 25 July 2025, the Attorney-General's report expressed concern that the bill's blanket disqualification for prisoners, transitional provisions relating to prisoner voting, tightened registration deadline and revised bribery offense were inconsistent with the New Zealand Bill of Rights Act 1990.

The justice select committee released its report about the Electoral Amendment Bill on 27 November 2025. Following feedback from the Attorney-General and public consultation, the committee recommended several changes to the bill including transitional arrangements for prisoner voting, provisional enrolment for 17-year olds, automatic enrolment updates and exercising the Māori option for out-of-cycle local government elections. The committee also discussed voter eligibility after the enrolment deadline, the timeframe for the vote count, and the implications of automatic enrolment for Māori voters.

The opposition Labour, Green parties and Te Pāti Māori issued differing views on the Electoral Amendment Bill. The Labour Party opposed the bill on the ground that it facilitated voter suppression and pointed out that 80% of submissions received by the justice select committee were opposed to the bill. It also objected to the disenfranchisement of prisoners, which it described as a retrospective increase in punishment and an infringement on free speech. Similarly, the Greens opposed the bill on the grounds that it undermined democracy and contravened the Bill of Rights Act 1990. The Greens objected to restricting the timeframe for voter enrolment to 13 days before polling day and prisoner disenfranchisement as disadvantageous to younger and ethnic minority voters. The Greens also objected to the ban on providing free food and drinks at polling booths and the increased donation limits. Similar arguments on the proposed bill were echoed by independent Member of Parliament Ferris and Te Pāti Māori.

=== Final readings ===
The bill passed its second reading on 9 December 2025 with the support of the governing coalition parties. It was referred to the Committee of the Whole House that same day under urgency.

On 16 December 2025, the Bill passed its third reading along party lines; with the governing coalition supporting the bill and the opposition parties denouncing the bill as voter suppression. Labour MP Andersen described the Bill as "among the worst legislation the government had passed." The Electoral Amendment Act 2025 received royal assent on 18 December 2025.
