= Special vote =

Provisional ballot in New Zealand elections

In elections in New Zealand, a special vote, also known as a special declaration vote, is a provisional ballot used in special circumstances. Special votes are cast by voters who are not able to cast an ordinary vote. The voter's eligibility to be a special voter must be confirmed before the ballot is included in the election result. The Electoral Act 1993 sets out the valid reasons an elector may qualify to be a special voter in elections of members to the New Zealand House of Representatives.

Special votes are also available in local government elections under the Local Electoral Act 2001.

== Overview ==
=== Electoral Act 1993 ===
Most votes cast in New Zealand parliamentary elections are ordinary votes. These votes are cast by within electoral districts (electorates) by electors who are qualified to vote in those electorates and whose names appear on the electoral roll for their electorate.

Section 61 of the Electoral Act 1993 sets out that any elector may vote as a special voter if they are:

- in New Zealand but outside of their electorate, and the polling booth is not equipped to take ordinary votes for their electorate;
- overseas;
- not on the printed electoral roll they believe they should be;
- enrolled to vote later than 31 days before the election (Writ Day);
- on the unpublished electoral roll;
- ill or infirm and cannot get to a polling place;
- in hospital;
- a prisoner on remand; or
- able to satisfy the returning officer that going to a polling place would cause hardship or serious inconvenience.

Before receiving their voting documents, electors must make a declaration that they believe they are eligible to be a special voter and that they have not already voted in the election. These declarations are reviewed and validated (for example, to ensure the voter is correctly enrolled) before the corresponding special vote is counted. Special votes are counted in the electorate for which they are cast, and the Electoral Act 1993 provides a 10-day window for special votes to be returned to their electorate after the day of the election. Three weeks after the preliminary (election day) result is released, the official election result is released which includes all valid special votes.

Like ordinary votes, most special votes are cast in-person at polling places. There exist mechanisms for a small number of electors who cannot visit polling places to vote with assistance, such as through a telephone dictation voting service, by mail, and (for overseas voters only) online voting.

=== Local Electoral Act 2001 ===
Voting in New Zealand local elections is usually by mail. Ordinary voting documents are mailed to electors by the electoral officer for their local authority. An elector may be a special voter if:

- their name is not on the relevant electoral roll (and therefore would not have been mailed ordinary voting documents for the correct election);
- they spoiled or did not receive their ordinary voting documents.
- they satisfy the electoral officer that casting an ordinary vote would cause hardship or serious inconvenience.

A ratepayer elector (an elector who owns property in a council district where they do not reside) can be a special elector. Special votes at local elections are usually provided in-person.

== History ==
Special voting in parliamentary elections became available for the first time in 1905 as an extension of the absentee voting right held by merchant seafarers, commercial travellers and shearers. The Electoral Act 1905 provided that any elector could apply in writing (by completing the relevant form held at any polling place) to vote outside their electorate on polling day. The replacement Electoral Act 1927 provided for postal voting by absent voters as well as "voting on declaration" which is equivalent to modern special voting. The term "special vote" appeared for the first time in legislation in the Electoral Act 1956.

Advance ordinary voting became available for all electors at the 2011 election, so people who cannot attend a polling booth in their electorate on election day can cast their vote early without having to cast a special vote. Particularly in densely populated urban areas, the Electoral Commission will make voting documents available at a polling place for multiple nearby electorates. These efforts are designed to make voting easier by providing more flexibility in when electors may vote and also by providing special voters opportunities to cast an ordinary vote before election day. However, both the number of special votes and the proportion of votes that are special votes are generally increasing with time.

Special voting in New Zealand elections, 2008 to 2023
	Number of special votes	Number of total votes	Proportion of votes that are special votes
2008	270,965	2,356,536	11.4%
2011	263,469	2,257,336	11.7%
2014	330,985	2,446,279	13.5%
2017	446,287	2,630,173	17.0%
2020	504,625	2,919,086	17.2%
2023	603,257	2,883,412	20.9%

Although there is a perception that special votes are largely from overseas voters, in 2023 only about 14% of special votes came from overseas (up from 12.5% in 2020).

In the pre-1996 era of First Past the Post voting, special votes favoured the centre-right National Party over the centre-left Labour Party.

Analysis of comparisons between post-1996 election night results and official results indicate that special voters are more likely to vote for left-leaning political parties and tend to be younger and more transient than the average voter. Notably, in 1999, Jeanette Fitzsimons of the Green Party won Coromandel after special votes were counted, the party's first electorate win. The provisional result on election night has overestimated the number of list MPs won by the National Party by one or two seats in every election since 2005.
