= Voting rights of prisoners in New Zealand =

A prisoner in New Zealand loses their right to vote in parliamentary or local body elections at sentencing, and regains their voting rights immediately upon release. No limitations are imposed on those serving home detention and anyone detained on remand (prior to trial or sentencing) may still enrol and vote. Voting rights may also be taken away on conviction for corrupt practices, or for persons detained under certain conditions relating to their inability to stand trial, or acquitted for reasons of insanity.

The voting rights of prisoners have changed numerous times since the first general election in New Zealand in 1853. Between 1975 and 1977 all prisoners were allowed to vote, but for the rest of its history, the country has vacillated between allowing voting for a specific subset of prisoners, or for none at all.

Prior to 1905 some prisoners retained their voting rights dependent on the type of crime they had committed. From 1905 the exception was changed, applying to prisoners serving a sentence shorter than one year. In 1956 this exception was removed and no prisoner was allowed to vote. In 1975 a law gave all prisoners the right to vote, but this was reversed in 1977. In 1993, along with broader electoral reform, (Note: See Electoral Act 1993.) voting rights were given to prisoners serving less than three years. This exception was removed in 2010, before being reinstated in 2020, then removed again in 2025.

Because the current law came into effect in December 2025 and is not retrospective to those already sentenced, there are some prisoners who are still eligible to vote, having been already sentenced to a term less than three years.

== History to 2010 ==
The New Zealand Constitution Act 1852 set out the requirements for enfranchisement. Prisoners were expressly excluded from registration for voting where they were serving a sentence for "any treason, felony, or infamous offence". Prisoners who had completed their sentence were eligible to vote. In 1879, prisoners were further disenfranchised by the Qualification of Electors Act, which provided that prisoners who had completed their punishments were not able to register to vote again until 12 months had passed since the end of their sentence.

The Electoral Act 1905 changed the scope of enfranchisement, removing the 12 month post-imprisonment disqualification period, but widening the ambit of what kind of prisoner would be disqualified. Rather than focusing on the kind of crime, this Act looked at the length of sentence, with anyone sentenced to death or a year or more of imprisonment being ineligible to vote. The law changed again in 1956, removing the one year threshold, thus disenfranchising all who were prisoners at the time of an election. The trend was very much towards increasing disenfranchisement of prisoners. This was reversed briefly with the Electoral Amendment Act 1975, passed under a Labour government, which amended the 1956 Act and completely removed the provision that took away the right of prisoners to vote. This change did not last long. In 1977, under a National government, the law reverted to the original 1956 position of complete disenfranchisement for anyone serving a custodial sentence at the time of an election.

In 1993, New Zealand underwent an electoral system overhaul in which the rights of prisoners changed again. The Electoral Act 1993 re-enfranchised some prisoners, only excluding those sentenced to three years or more, including life sentences and preventive detention. This remained the position until 2010.

== Law from 2010 to 2020 ==
=== 2010 legislation ===
The Electoral (Disqualification of Sentenced Prisoners) Amendment Bill was introduced into Parliament as a private member's bill by Paul Quinn of the National Party on 10 February 2010. The Bill's first reading occurred on 21 April 2010. It was then referred to the Law and Order Select Committee to review the legislation and make any changes necessary. The decision to send the Bill to the Law and Order Select Committee was criticised by opponents of the Bill, with members of the Labour Party walking out of the committee meeting on the first day. This is because the Law and Order committee is primarily staffed with members from the Department of Corrections who traditionally deal with "matters relating to corrections, courts, criminal law, police, and serious fraud." It was contended by opposition members that a more appropriate committee would have been the Justice and Electoral Committee. This committee is aided by staff from the Ministry of Justice and deals with "matters relating to Crown legal and drafting services, electoral matters, human rights, and justice." The select committee received a large number of submissions on the Bill, with the majority being opposed to the legislation's passage. There were two submissions made in support of the Bill, one of which was by the legislation's introducer, Paul Quinn. However, some of the submissions made were as part of assessment for an Otago University paper, and this could have skewed the results slightly. Despite the overwhelming number of submissions opposed, the Bill was returned to the House with little changed. The Bill had its second reading on 20 October 2010. Its final reading was on 8 December 2010 and it received royal assent on 15 December 2010. The legislation took effect from 16 December 2010.

Under the legislation, anyone detained in a prison on a sentence of imprisonment was unable to register as an elector. This was achieved by the deregistration of prisoners, meaning they would have to reregister to vote when released from prison. The legislation was not retrospective in effect, so any prisoners who were convicted to a less than three-year sentence before the enactment of the new law, would still be allowed to vote. In its original form, the legislation did not include a saving provision of this nature, so it would have had the effect of disenfranchising everyone convicted after the commencement of the Act, but also of re-enfranchising everyone convicted before the Act. This drafting oversight was amended by way of supplementary order paper, as it would have completely undermined the point of the legislation if enacted in that form.

Paul Quinn based his justification for the legislation loosely on social contract theory. This is the idea that prisoners have breached the contract with the state, and therefore some of their rights can be validly restricted. This was the view advanced by many supporting members in their speeches but perhaps put most clearly by Jonathan Young during the bill's Third reading. "The social contract that undergirds every stable society must balance human rights with human responsibilities, or said essentially, in order to participate in the process of selecting our lawmakers who shape our society, one ought not to be a serious lawbreaker." Removing the right to vote is essentially another form of punishment for criminals. In reality, there was little substantive argument made in favour of the legislation as it passed through Parliament, something which did not go unnoticed by commentators.

=== Criticisms of the law ===
Under section 7 of the New Zealand Bill of Rights Act 1990 (NZBORA) if there is an apparent inconsistency between legislation being introduced and the NZBORA, the Attorney-General must bring this to the attention of the House as soon as possible. There was a section 7 report filed in respect of this legislation by Christopher Finlayson. There was, in the opinion of the Attorney-General, an inconsistency between the Bill and section 12 of NZBORA, which affirms the voting rights of New Zealand citizens. Under section 5 of NZBORA, rights are not absolute, but can be limited so long as those limits are "demonstrably justified in a free and democratic society." There are two questions that the Attorney-General and the courts will look at in determining whether the limit comes under section 5. Firstly, whether the "provision serves an important and significant objective" and secondly whether there is a "rational and proportionate connection between the provision and the objective." The Attorney-General considered that although the objective of the Bill (to prevent serious offenders from voting) may have been in fact important, there was no rational connection between the limit and that objective. A blanket ban effects not only serious offenders, but all offenders regardless of the nature of their offending, so the limit is more related to the time of the offending in relation to an election. This is not a rational or proportional limitation. Academic Andrew Geddis notes that in the debates surrounding the Bill, this report was scarcely mentioned by supporters of the legislation, and there was no justification of the rights limitations made substantively by supporters either.

The uneven application of the Bill was a concern for the Attorney-General and also opposition members. An example that came up frequently in debates was the disparity between a sentence of home detention and of imprisonment and the effect that would have on offenders. It is possible to have offenders who have committed the same offence in similar circumstances have a disparity between their sentences as one may be eligible for home detention, whereas the other is not because of a difference in personal circumstances. An offender given a sentence of home detention will not be caught by this legislation and as such will not be removed from the electoral roll. The opposition also noted the position was not changing for prisoners housed in a hospital instead of a prison. Under previous legislation, they were both treated the same, but the new legislation disenfranchises offenders housed in prisons, but those housed in secure hospitals are still allowed to vote if their sentence is less than three years.

Another issue that was mentioned by opponents to the legislation and in the submission of the Electoral Enrolment Centre was the fact that prisoners are removed from the electoral roll completely. The concerns revolved around the fact that it is already difficult to get people who are marginalised onto the electoral roll, so their removal could mean that many people simply wouldn't bother to re-enrol after their release, which would mean their disenfranchisement could possibly extend much further than just the length of their sentence. The EEC suggested that the Bill be amended to include a requirement for Prison Superintendents to send the EEC a completed enrolment form when offenders are released. This was considered by the Select Committee but not adopted into the law, preferring to let the departments organise this as between themselves.

=== Legal challenges to the law ===
In 2014, the law was challenged in the High Court by a number of serving prisoners. The challenge was founded on a number of grounds, including inconsistency with multiple provisions of the New Zealand Bill of Rights Act, inconsistency with the ICCPR and inconsistency with the Treaty of Waitangi. It was alleged that not only was the legislation inconsistent with the right to vote in NZBORA, but that it would also disproportionately affect Māori, who make up around 51% of the prison population, thereby becoming a form of discrimination against Māori. The court noted that similar laws in other countries had been struck down by their higher courts, something which New Zealand courts do not have the jurisdiction to do. The court found that there was no way to read the section in a manner consistent with the NZBORA, however, because of s 4 of that Act, the provision must still be applied in full. It was also held that it would be difficult to say that the provision was in line with New Zealand's international law obligations, and that it was likely to be inconsistent with the Treaty of Waitangi, although the court did not have jurisdiction to rule on that matter. The judge said that the criticisms of the provision were "numerous and weighty" but also noted that, despite the "constitutionally objectionable" nature of the provision, "Parliament has... spoken" and declined a remedy for the applicants.

In the decision Taylor v Attorney-General on 24 July 2015 Justice Heath in the Auckland High Court issued a formal declaration that the blanket ban on prisoners' voting was inconsistent with section 12(a) of the Bill of Rights. This is that every New Zealand citizen over the age of 18 years has the right to vote in periodic elections of member of the House of Representatives, which elections shall be by equal suffrage.

The appeal to the finding that the 2010 blanket ban was inconsistent with the section 12(a) of the Bill of Rights was dismissed on 26 May 2017 in Taylor v Attorney General NZCA 215. Additionally, the appellant was made to pay the second to fifth's respondents' costs for a complex appeal on a Band A basis with usual disbursements.

On 9 November 2018 the Supreme Court of New Zealand also agreed with the High Court's decision in favour of Taylor in Taylor v Attorney General NZSC 104.

On 9 August 2019 the Waitangi Tribunal found that "section 80(1)(d) of the Electoral Act 1993 breached the principles of the Treaty. The Tribunal further found that the Crown has failed in its duty to actively protect the right of Māori to equitably participate in the electoral process and exercise their tino rangatiratanga individually and collectively."

== Re-enfranchisement of short-term prisoners in 2020 ==
On 23 November 2019, the Minister of Justice, Andrew Little, announced that the Sixth Labour Government would introduce an Electoral Amendment Bill to allow prisoners who had been sentenced to less than three years in prison to vote, in time for the 2020 New Zealand general election, reversing the previous National Government's decision to disallow all serving prisoners in 2010. The bill passed and received royal assent on 29 June 2020.

The Government's policy shift had been preceded by Taylor and other prisoners' legal challenge, a High Court ruling that the law change violated the Bill of Rights Act and Treaty of Waitangi, and a Waitangi Tribunal report that the prisoner voting ban disproportionately affected Māori prisoners.

While Little's announcement was welcomed by Green MP Golriz Ghahraman, National Party leader Simon Bridges criticised the Government for being "soft on crime" and vowed that a National Government would reverse any such law change.

== 2025 ==
On 17 December 2025, Parliament passed the Sixth National Government's new Electoral Amendment Act 2025 banning sentenced prisoners from voting. It received royal assent on 19 December 2025.
