= Reena Baba Saheb Kangale =

Indian civil servant

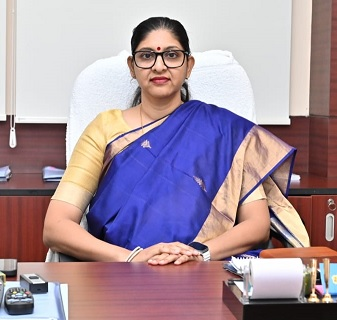
- Born: 8 March 1978 (age 48); Nagpur, Maharashtra
- Occupation: IAS Officer

Reena Baba Saheb Kangale (born 8 March 1978) is an Indian civil servant serving as the Chief Electoral Officer of Chhattisgarh since January 2020.

She is an Indian Administrative Officer of the 2003, Chhattisgarh Cadre.

Kangale is also the Joint secretary to the Government of India.

She has worked on multiple governmental positions, including Secretary of Women and Child Development, Secretary of SC, ST, and OBC Development, Director of Mining and Geology for the Government of Chhattisgarh, as well as District Collector in significant mining, forested, and tribal-dominated districts such as Dantewada, Durg, and Korba in Chhattisgarh. As the Chief Electoral Officer, she is responsible for supervising electoral processes in Chhattisgarh.

== Early life ==
Kangale was born on 8 March 1978, in Nagpur, Maharashtra. Her father served as an IPS officer. She obtained her L.L.B from Dr. B. R. Ambedkar National Law University.

== Career ==
Kangale became an IAS officer in 2003 in the Chhattisgarh Cadre. She successfully spearheaded the Parliamentary Elections of 2024 with a record of one of the highest voter turnouts of 72.80% overall with a 1.31% increase from last parliamentary elections of 2019.

In 2023, Reena Kangale facilitated polling in 102 villages significantly impacted by Naxal activities inside the Bastar division. The vote has occurred for the first time in National Elections since independence, attributed to the normalization of the situation and confidence-building measures.

During the Assembly Elections of 2023 showcasing her leadership history was created when first time in elections all polling booths were completely managed by women in an assembly segment. In Raipur City North Assembly constituency, 201 booths were fully managed by 1046 women.

As a result of her efforts in the 2024 Indian general election, 100% voter turnout was achieved in numerous polling sites within the state that had PVTG enrollment. The Governor of Chhattisgarh and the Election Commission of India commended her efforts to promote voting among PVTGs with booth-level officials.

In March 2025, Reena Baba Saheb Kangale has been appointed to the position of Joint secretary to the Government of India.

== Awards and recognition ==
Best Performing State Award for Election Management 2024 for overall conduct of free, fair, inclusive and participative elections in Chhattisgarh.
