= Electoral Commission (New Zealand) =

Crown entity administering elections in New Zealand

- Te Kaitiaki Take Kōwhiri (Māori)

Crown entity overview
- Formed: 1 October 2010
- Preceding agencies: Electoral Commission; Chief Electoral Office; Electoral Enrolment Centre
- Jurisdiction: New Zealand
- Headquarters: Wellington
- Crown entity executive: Karl Le Quesne, Chief Electoral Officer and Chief Executive
- Website: vote.nz elections.nz

The Electoral Commission (Māori: Te Kaitiaki Take Kōwhiri) is an independent Crown entity set up by the New Zealand Parliament. It is responsible for the administration of parliamentary elections and referendums, promoting compliance with electoral laws, servicing the work of the Representation Commission, and the provision of advice, reports and public education on electoral matters. The commission also assists electoral agencies of other countries on a reciprocal basis with their electoral events.

== Objective ==
The Electoral Act 1993 defines the objective of the Electoral Commission as

"to administer the electoral system impartially, efficiently, effectively, and in a way that –

1. Facilitates participation in parliamentary democracy; and
2. Promotes understanding of the electoral system; and
3. Maintains confidence in the administration of the electoral system"

== Functions ==
The functions of the Electoral Commission are defined by law and in summary comprise:

- Preparation and conduct of general elections, by-elections, and referendums
- Allocating government monies to registered political parties for radio and television broadcasting
- Promoting public awareness of electoral matters through education and information programmes
- Giving advice to the minister and the House of Representatives on electoral matters referred to the commission
- Making available information to assist political parties, candidates, and third parties to meet their statutory obligations in respect of electoral matters administered by the commission
- Compiling and maintaining electoral rolls (from 1 July 2012)

== Independence ==
The Electoral Commission is an independent Crown entity. The responsible minister may not direct the commission to give effect to, or have regard to, government policy.

In addition:

- the governor-general appoints and removes electoral commissioners on the recommendation of the House of Representatives
- the Electoral Commission has a statutory duty to act independently in performing its statutory duties and functions and exercising its powers
- the Electoral Commission may provide information and advice to the minister of justice or the House of Representatives at any time and of its own volition

== Board members ==
The Electoral Commission board has six members, appointed by the governor-general, including one member as the chairperson, one member as the deputy chairperson and the chief electoral officer, who is the chief executive of the Electoral Commission.

In June 2026 it was announced that the Electoral Commission board had expanded from three to six members. The three new members, David O'Connor, Murray Jack, and Sue Elliott, are serving three year terms, which began in May 2026.

Position	Name	Portrait	Date of appointment
Chair	Simon Moore		18 November 2024
Deputy chair	Jane Meares		19 August 2019
Chief electoral officer	Karl Le Quesne		21 April 2022
Board member	David O'Connor		22 May 2026
Board member	Murray Jack		22 May 2026
Board member	Sue Elliott		22 May 2026

== Electoral events conducted by the Electoral Commission ==
Electoral event	Date
Mana by-election	20 November 2010
Botany by-election	5 March 2011
Te Tai Tokerau by-election	25 June 2011
2011 general election	26 November 2011
Referendum on the voting system	26 November 2011
MMP Review	February–October 2012
Ikaroa-Rawhiti by-election	29 June 2013
2013 New Zealand local elections	12 October 2016
Christchurch East by-election	30 November 2013
Asset sales referendum	22 November – 13 December 2013
2014 general election	20 September 2014
Northland by-election	28 March 2015
First New Zealand flag referendum	20 November – 11 December 2015
Second New Zealand flag referendum	3–24 March 2016
2016 New Zealand local elections	8 October 2016
Mount Roskill by-election	3 December 2016
Mount Albert by-election	25 February 2017
2017 general election	23 September 2017
Northcote by-election	9 June 2018
2020 general election	17 October 2020
2020 cannabis referendum	17 October 2020
2020 euthanasia referendum	17 October 2020
2022 Tauranga by-election	18 June 2022
2022 Hamilton West by-election	10 December 2022
2023 general election	14 October 2023
2023 Port Waikato by-election	25 November 2023

== History ==
=== Formation ===
The Electoral (Administration) Amendment Bill, passed unanimously by Parliament on 19 May 2010, established a new independent Electoral Commission which was given overarching responsibility to administer elections.

The Electoral Commission, which took over the responsibilities of the Chief Electoral Office and the previous Electoral Commission, was formed on 1 October 2010.

On 1 July 2012, the statutory responsibilities of the Electoral Enrolment Centre of NZ Post were transferred to the commission in accordance with the Electoral (Administration) Amendment Act 2011.

=== Previous incarnation ===
The previous Electoral Commission of New Zealand (1993–2010) was a governmental body responsible for administering certain aspects of the country's electoral system. It was an independent Crown entity, not part of any larger department or Ministry, and was established under the Electoral Act 1993. It worked alongside two other bodies, the Chief Electoral Office and the Electoral Enrolment Centre.

The four primary functions of the previous Electoral Commission were:

- Registration of political parties – The commission was responsible for scrutinising and approving all changes to the electoral register. A place on the register allowed parties to contest the party vote in general elections. Unregistered parties could put forward individual candidates, but could not receive votes for proportional representation under the mixed-member proportional representation system. The commission must have been satisfied that such a party met the requirements for registration, such as having 500 financial members.
- Allocating broadcasting funding – Political parties were given state funding for any broadcasting they conducted in an election campaign. The commission was responsible for dividing money between the various parties, taking into account a party's membership, current number of MPs, previous election performance, and current polling. The commission also supervised the actual payment of this funding.
- Supervision of financial declarations – To ensure transparency, parties were required to submit records showing how much money they received as donations and how much money they spent campaigning. The commission supervised this process.
- Public education – The commission was the primary body charged with ensuring strong public awareness of how elections in New Zealand work.

For most business, the previous Electoral Commission consisted of four members – a president, a chief executive, the head of the Ministry of Justice, and the chief judge of the Māori Land Court.

Two additional members, one appointed by the Government and one by the opposition, participated in the commission, e.g. on the allocation of broadcasting funds. This participation was generally condemned by smaller parties, which claimed that Labour and National unfairly monopolised funding. These additional members were removed by Labour through the Electoral Finance Act 2007 (EFA); but the Act was repealed by National in 2009, with clauses of the EFA dealing with donation disclosure inserted into the 1993 Electoral Act.
