= DX Mail =

Private postal organisation in New Zealand

New Zealand Document Exchange
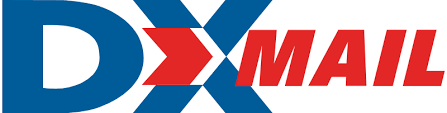
- Type: Subsidiary
- Industry: Mail
- Founded: 1971
- Headquarters: Auckland, New Zealand
- Area served: New Zealand
- Services: Mail
- Parent: Freightways Group
- Website: https://dxmail.co.nz/

The New Zealand Document Exchange, commonly known by its trading name DX Mail, is a private postal organisation operating in New Zealand.

== Background ==
Beginning in the 1970s as a document exchange system for lawyers between practices, the group later expanded into delivery services following the liberalisation of New Zealand's postal laws in the 1980s and 1990s. DX Mail is a subsidiary of the Freightways Group.

New Zealand is one of only a few countries that allows private enterprise to provide postal services. DX Mail is in direct competition with New Zealand Post, New Zealand's state-owned national postal service. The DX Mail delivery network is mostly limited to areas within New Zealand's cities and satellite towns, and passes on any mail lodged through its system for addresses it cannot cover to New Zealand Post. DX Mail is one of several privately owned mail delivery providers in the country that issue unofficial postage stamps for letters they carry.

== Services ==
DX Mail posties primarily deliver using a motorcycle and deliver their rounds five days a week. The company claims this is an advantage over the delivery service offered by main competitor New Zealand Post, which delivers three days a week.

Aside from standard delivery services, DX Mail operates exchanges similar to PO Box lobbies. This enables its customers to send mail and parcels overnight to other customers in the DX Mail network.

The "Branchlink" service provides overnight delivery of documents, packages and supplies between branches of the same firm.

DX Facilities Management offers larger firms and government departments in-house handling over their mailroom, workplace events and other facilities such as reception. DX Mail is currently contracted to service 17 mailrooms in Auckland, Wellington and Christchurch.

Beginning in 2021 in Palmerston North, DX Mail has overseen delivery and ballot collection services for several New Zealand local government elections, which are done by postal vote.
