= Chief Electoral Officer (India) =

Election authority in India

Chief Electoral Officer is a statutory authority created for representing Election Commission of India for conducting elections in states and union territories of India. Constitution of India with introduction of Article 324 made the powers of Chief Electoral Officer(India) independent. Their duties and powers are bound under Section 13 A of Representation of the People Act, 1950 read with Section 20 of Representation of the People Act, 1951.

== History and administration ==
The role of Chief Electoral Officer(India) is highlighted under Section 13 A of Representation of the People Act, 1950 read with Section 20 of Representation of the People Act, 1951 for performing the functions under the supervision and direction of Election Commission of India. Chief Electoral Officer is deputed by Election Commission of India in all states of India.

== Roles and responsibilities ==
Chief Electoral Officer (India) roles and responsibilities are categorised under following heads:

=== Pre-election ===
- Ensuring compliance of important activities which includes meeting with representatives of local political party, resolving their issues over updates in electoral rolls.
- Awareness of elections to general public through media.
- Ensuring availability of stationery such as indelible ink and rubber stamps.
- Checking Electronic Voting Machines (EVMs) requirements and informing the Election Commission,.
- Other ancillary activities required for conducting polls.
- Proper and timely printing of ballot papers.
- Preparation of press note on election programmes and notifying it in the State Gazette.
- Observing that Model Code of Conduct is followed and sending daily report to The Election Commission .
- Ensuring complaint monitoring system is in order.
- Declaration of polling day as holiday, and
- Ensuring sufficient poll observers are in state.

==== Law and order maintenance ====
- Reviewing law and order situation is proper.
- Ensuring timely measures are taken through detailed assessment.
- One of the most important areas of his role is maintaining inter-state coordination and closing of state borders when needed.
- Critical polling stations identification as per the guidelines of the Election Commission.
- Making vulnerability mapping of election areas prior to the elections after consulting local police officials and field officers.
- Assessing the availability and additional need of state police personnel and forces for security and sending the requirement, if any to the Election Commission.
- Ensuring plan for security deployment is as per Election Commission's directives.
- Check functioning of Helpline and other Complaint Cell are operational at different levels in the state.

=== During election ===
- Primary responsibility is to inform Election Commission of India of commencement of polling at scheduled time.
- Sending Election Commission of statutory reports in prescribed formats on polling day at 1 pm and 7 pm and on subsequent day at 7 am.
- Ensuring arrangements are in place at polling booths and demonstration in all districts of state of Electronic Voting Machines.
- Sealing of Electronic Voting Machines and election papers under his directions.
- Recommending re-poll when needed.
- In case of re-poll, primary task being to send proposals for re-poll schedule based on the returning officer scrutiny report.
- Arrangements for repoll based on guidelines of Election Commission.

=== Post-election ===
- Main responsibility of informing district authorities of the date, time and place of counting.
- Ensuring that candidates and their polling agents are informed of counting.
- Ensuring that counting personnel and trained and sufficient counting personnel are available.
- Making arrangements for free flow of information about results of various rounds of counting.
- Ensuring availability of Additional counting staff, if needed.
- Making note of candidates election expenditure.
- Directing district electoral officer or the returning officer during important decisions.
- Maintaining daily expenditure details from nomination date to the date of announcement of results.

== Constitutional requirements ==
Chief Electoral Officer (India) are deputed in States and Union Territories of India by Election Commission of India under Section 13 A of Representation of the People Act, 1950 read with Section 20 of Representation of the People Act, 1951 to act on their behalf during the elections.

== Eligibility ==
Following are the Eligibility for becoming Chief Electoral Officer:

- Must be Citizen of India.
- Should not hold office of profit.
- Should belong to Indian Administrative Services cadre.
- Should not be a member of any political party or affiliated to any political party during tenure as Chief Electoral Officer.
- Should not be serving in Financial Institution, Banking Institution or in Legal practice in Courts.

== Chief electoral officers by state ==
The following is the list of chief electoral officers for states of India.

Rank	State	Electoral officers
1	Andhra Pradesh	Shri Vivek Yadav
2	Arunachal Pradesh	Smt. Juhi Mukherjee
3	Assam	Sh. Mukesh C. Sahu
4	Bihar	Sh. H.R. Shrinivas
5	Chhattisgarh	Smt. Reena Baba Saheb Kangale
6	Goa	Smt. Sh. Kunal
7	Gujarat	Mr. Anupam Anand
8	Haryana	Mr. Sh. Anurag Agarwal
9	Himachal Pradesh	Mr. Sh. Devesh Kumar
10	Jharkhand	Mr. K. Ravi Kumar
11	Karnataka	Mr. Sh. Sanjiv Kumar
12	Kerala	Dr. Rathan.U. Kelkar IAS
13	Madhya Pradesh	Mr. V.L. Kantha Rao
14	Maharashtra	Mr. Baldev Singh
15	Manipur	Mr. Prashant Kumar Singh
16	Meghalaya	Mr.Sh. F.R. Kharkongor
17	Mizoram	Mr Ashish Kundra
18	Nagaland	Mr Abhijit Sinha
19	Odisha	Mr Sushil Kumar Lohani
20	Punjab	Mr S. Karuna Raju
21	Rajasthan	Sh. Naveen Mahajan
22	Sikkim	Mr Ravindra Telang
23	Tamil Nadu	Mr Satyabrat Sahoo
24	Telangana	Mr Vikas Raj
25	Tripura	Mr Sriram Taranikanti
26	Uttar Pradesh	Mr Ajay Kumar Shukla
27	Uttarakhand	Ms. Sowjanya
28	West Bengal	Mr. Aariz Aftab
29	Andaman and Nicobar Islands	Mr. K. R. Meena
30	Chandigarh	Mr. Sh. Ajoy Kr. Sinha
31	Dadra and Nagar Haveli and Daman and Diu	Ms. Pooja Jain
32	Delhi	Dr. Ranveer Singh
33	Jammu and Kashmir	Mr. Sh. Shailendra Kumar
34	Ladakh	
35	Lakshadweep	Sh. Vijendra Singh Rawat
36	Pondicherry	Sh. Shurbir Singh

== See also ==
- Election Commission of India
- State Election Commission in India
