= Electoral Enrolment Centre (New Zealand) =

The Electoral Enrolment Centre maintained the New Zealand electoral rolls and conducted the Māori Electoral Option, which gives Māori the chance to choose between being on the Māori or general electoral roll. Established in 1981, the centre was a self-contained business unit of New Zealand Post, under contract to the Minister of Justice. The centre had a team of Registrars of Electors – one for each electorate. The Registrars were responsible for compiling and maintaining the electoral rolls for their electorate, conducting enrolment update campaigns prior to all major electoral events (local elections, parliamentary elections, and referendums, etc.), and encouraging eligible voters to enrol.

Following the Electoral (Administration) Amendment Act 2011, the functions of the Electoral Enrolment Centre were transferred to the Electoral Commission on 1 July 2012.
