= List of parliaments of New Zealand =

Since the adoption of the New Zealand Constitution Act 1852, which granted New Zealand self-governance, New Zealand has had its own parliament. Regular elections to the New Zealand House of Representatives have been held since the first in 1853.

This page lists every parliament of New Zealand along with:

- its corresponding general election and the date(s) of that election;
- the term for which that parliament met; and
- the partisan makeup of each parliament after the introduction of political parties (this does not include later changes to parliamentary composition).

Note that it was not until the election of members of the 8th Parliament in 1881 that all positions were filled on the same day. Until then, polls were held in individual electorates on different days within an election period. Elections for members of Māori electorates, which commenced with supplementary elections in 1868, were held separately from elections for general electorates until the election of the 30th Parliament in 1951.

== List of parliaments ==
Key for political party colours (see also: List of political parties in New Zealand)

Li Liberal
Co Conservative
Re Reform
Un United
La Labour
Co Country
Na National
Sc Social Credit
NL NewLabour
Al Alliance
Fi NZ First
Ac ACT
Gr Green
Uf United Future
Pr Progressive
Mi Māori
Op Opportunity
In Independent
_ Other

Parliaments of New Zealand
| Parliament | Election | | | Term of Parliament | | Parliamentary makeup (as at start of parliament) |
| Parliament | Year | Date | Turnout | Start | End | Parliamentary makeup (as at start of parliament) |
|---|---|---|---|---|---|---|
| 1st | 1853 | 14 July 1853 – 1 October 1853 (general); — (Māori) | — | 24 May 1854 | 15 September 1855 | 37: In 37 |
| 2nd | 1855 | 26 October 1855 – 28 December 1855 (general); — (Māori) | — | 15 April 1856 | 5 November 1860 | 37: In 37 |
| 3rd | 1860/61 | 12 December 1860 – 28 March 1861 (general); — (Māori) | — | 3 June 1861 | 30 October 1865 | 53: In 53 |
| 4th | 1866/1868 | 12 February 1866 – 6 April 1866 (general); 15 April 1868 – 20 June 1868 (Māori) | — | 30 June 1866 | 13 September 1870 | 70: In 70 |
| 5th | 1871 | 14 January 1871 – 23 February 1871 (general); 1 February 1871 – 15 February 1871 (Māori) | — | 14 August 1871 | 21 October 1875 | 78: In 78 |
| 6th | 1875/76 | 20 December 1875 – 29 January 1876 (general); 4 January 1876 – 15 January 1876 (Māori) | — | 15 June 1876 | 11 August 1879 | 88: In 88 |
| 7th | 1879 | 28 August 1879 – 15 September 1879 (general); 8 September 1879 (Māori) | 66.50% | 24 September 1879 | 24 September 1881 | 88: In 88 |
| 8th | 1881 | 8 December 1881 (general); 9 December 1881 (Māori) | 66.50% | 18 May 1882 | 24 June 1884 | 95: In 95 |
| 9th | 1884 | 21 July 1884 (general); 22 July 1884 (Māori) | 60.60% | 7 August 1884 | 10 June 1887 | 95: In 95 |
| 10th | 1887 | 7 September 1887 (general); 26 September 1887 (Māori) | 67.10% | 6 October 1887 | 17 September 1890 | 95: In 95 |
| 11th | 1890 | 27 November 1890 (general); 5 December 1890 (Māori) | 80.40% | 23 January 1891 | 6 October 1893 | 74: Li 40 Co 25 In 9 |
| 12th | 1893 | 28 November 1893 (general); 20 December 1893 (Māori) | 75.20% | 21 June 1894 | 17 October 1896 | 74: Li 51 Co 13 In 10 |
| 13th | 1896 | 4 December 1896 (general); 19 December 1896 (Māori) | 76.10% | 6 April 1897 | 23 October 1899 | 74: Li 39 Co 26 In 9 |
| 14th | 1899 | 6 December 1899 (general); 19 December 1899 (Māori) | 77.60% | 21 June 1900 | 3 October 1902 | 74: Li 49 Co 19 In 6 |
| 15th | 1902 | 5 November 1902 (general); 22 December 1902 (Māori) | 76.70% | 29 June 1903 | 30 October 1905 | 80: Li 47 Co 19 In 14 |
| 16th | 1905 | 6 December 1905 (general); 20 December 1905 (Māori) | 83.30% | 27 June 1906 | 10 October 1908 | 80: Li 58 Co 16 In 4 _ 2 |
| 17th | 1908 | 17 November 1908 (general); 2 December 1908 (Māori) | 79.80% | 10 June 1909 | 28 October 1911 | 80: Li 50 Co 26 _ 1 In 3 |
| 18th | 1911 | 7 December 1911 (general); 19 December 1911 (Māori) | 83.50% | 15 February 1912 | 5 November 1914 | 80: Re 37 Li 33 In 6 _ 4 |
| 19th | 1914 | 10 December 1914 (general); 11 December 1914 (Māori) | 84.70% | 24 June 1915 | 5 November 1919 | 80: Re 40 Li 34 _ 5 In 1 |
| 20th | 1919 | 16 December 1919 (Note: Delayed due to World War I.) (general); 17 December 1919 (Māori) | 80.50% | 24 June 1920 | 31 October 1922 | 80: Re 45 Li 19 La 8 In 8 |
| 21st | 1922 | 6 December 1922 (general); 7 December 1922 (Māori) | 88.70% | 7 February 1923 | 1 October 1925 | 80: Re 37 Li 22 La 17 In 4 |
| 22nd | 1925 | 3 November 1925 (general); 4 November 1925 (Māori) | 90.90% | 16 June 1926 | 9 October 1928 | 80: Re 55 La 12 Li 11 In 2 |
| 23rd | 1928 | 13 October 1928 (general); 14 October 1928 (Māori) | 88.10% | 4 December 1928 | 11 November 1931 | 80: Un 27 Re 27 La 19 In 6 Co 1 |
| 24th | 1931 | 1 December 1931 (general); 2 December 1931 (Māori) | 83.30% | 23 February 1932 | 26 October 1935 | 80: Re 28 La 24 Un 19 In 8 Co 1 |
| 25th | 1935 | 26 November 1935 (Note: Delayed in hopes of better economic conditions.) (general); 27 November 1935 (Māori) | 90.80% | 25 March 1936 | 16 September 1938 | 80: La 53 Re 9 Un 7 In 7 Co 2 _ 2 |
| 26th | 1938 | 14 October 1938 (general); 15 October 1938 (Māori) | 92.90% | 27 June 1939 | 26 August 1943 | 80: La 53 Na 25 In 2 |
| 27th | 1943 | 24 September 1943 (Note: Delayed due to World War II.) (general); 25 September 1943 (Māori) | 82.80% | 22 February 1944 | 12 October 1946 | 80: La 45 Na 34 In 1 |
| 28th | 1946 | 26 November 1946 (general); 27 November 1946 (Māori) | 93.50% | 24 June 1947 | 21 October 1949 | 80: La 42 Na 38 |
| 29th | 1949 | 29 November 1949 (general); 30 November 1949 (Māori) | 93.50% | 27 June 1950 | 13 July 1951 | 80: Na 46 La 34 |
| 30th | 1951 | 1 September 1951 (Note: Snap election due to waterfront strike.) | 89.10% | 25 September 1951 | 1 October 1954 | 80: Na 50 La 30 |
| 31st | 1954 | 13 November 1954 | 91.40% | 22 March 1955 | 25 October 1957 | 80: Na 45 La 35 |
| 32nd | 1957 | 30 November 1957 (Note: General election held on last Saturday of November.) | 92.90% | 21 January 1958 | 28 October 1960 | 80: La 41 Na 39 |
| 33rd | 1960 | 26 November 1960 | 89.80% | 29 June 1961 | 25 October 1963 | 80: Na 46 La 34 |
| 34th | 1963 | 30 November 1963 | 89.60% | 10 June 1964 | 29 October 1966 | 80: Na 45 La 35 |
| 35th | 1966 | 26 November 1966 | 86.00% | 26 April 1967 | 24 October 1969 | 80: Na 44 La 35 Sc 1 |
| 36th | 1969 | 29 November 1969 | 88.90% | 12 March 1970 | 5 July 1974 | 84: Na 45 La 39 |
| 37th | 1972 | 25 November 1972 | 89.10% | 14 February 1973 | 10 October 1975 | 87: La 55 Na 32 |
| 38th | 1975 | 29 November 1975 | 82.50% | 22 June 1976 | 6 October 1978 | 87: Na 55 La 32 |
| 39th | 1978 | 25 November 1978 | 69.20% (Note: Due to major problems with the enrolment process, commentators generally consider that the 1978 election had a significantly higher turnout than official figures indicate.) | 16 May 1979 | 23 October 1981 | 92: Na 51 La 40 Sc 1 |
| 40th | 1981 | 28 November 1981 | 91.40% | 6 April 1982 | 14 June 1984 | 92: Na 47 La 43 Sc 2 |
| 41st | 1984 | 14 July 1984 (Note: Muldoon's snap election.) | 93.70% | 15 August 1984 | 29 July 1987 | 95: La 56 Na 37 Sc 2 |
| 42nd | 1987 | 15 August 1987 | 89.10% | 16 September 1987 | 6 September 1990 | 97: La 57 Na 40 |
| 43rd | 1990 | 27 October 1990 | 85.20% | 28 November 1990 | 23 September 1993 | 97: Na 67 La 29 NL 1 |
| 44th | 1993 | 6 November 1993 | 85.20% | 21 December 1993 | 27 August 1996 | 99: Na 50 La 45 Al 2 Fi 2 |
| 45th | 1996 | 12 October 1996 (Note: Called early to circumvent a by-election in Hawkes Bay.) | 88.30% | 12 December 1996 | 5 October 1999 | 120: Na 44 La 37 Fi 17 Al 13 Ac 8 _ 1 |
| 46th | 1999 | 27 November 1999 | 84.10% | 20 December 1999 | 11 June 2002 | 120: La 49 Na 39 Al 10 Ac 9 Gr 7 Fi 5 _ 1 |
| 47th | 2002 | 27 July 2002 (Note: Clark's snap election.) | 77.00% | 26 August 2002 | 2 August 2005 | 120: La 52 Na 27 Fi 13 Ac 9 Gr 9 Uf 8 Pr 2 |
| 48th | 2005 | 17 September 2005 | 80.90% | 7 November 2005 | 23 September 2008 | 121: La 50 Na 48 Fi 7 Gr 6 Mi 4 Uf 3 Ac 2 Pr 1 |
| 49th | 2008 | 8 November 2008 | 78.70% | 8 December 2008 | 6 October 2011 | 122: Na 58 La 43 Gr 9 Mi 5 Ac 5 Uf 1 Pr 1 |
| 50th | 2011 | 26 November 2011 | 74.20% | 20 December 2011 | 31 July 2014 | 121: Na 59 La 34 Gr 14 Fi 8 Mi 3 Ac 1 Uf 1 _ 1 |
| 51st | 2014 | 20 September 2014 | 77.90% | 20 October 2014 | 18 August 2017 | 121: Na 60 La 32 Gr 14 Fi 11 Mi 2 Ac 1 Uf 1 |
| 52nd | 2017 | 23 September 2017 | 79.80% | 7 November 2017 | 6 September 2020 | 120: Na 56 La 46 Fi 9 Gr 8 Ac 1 |
| 53rd | 2020 | 17 October 2020 (Note: Delayed due to COVID-19.) | 82.50% | 25 November 2020 | 8 September 2023 | 120: La 65 Na 33 Gr 10 Ac 10 Mi 2 |
| 54th | 2023 | 14 October 2023 | 78.20% | 5 December 2023 | 1 October 2026 | 123: Na 49 La 34 Gr 15 Ac 11 Fi 8 Mi 6 |
| 55th | 2026 | 7 November 2026 | TBC | TBC | | (Based on preliminary results:) 131: Na 42 La 36 Gr 16 Ac 13 Fi 12 Op 7 Mi 5 |

== See also ==
- List of New Zealand governments
