= NZ Post =

Postal service in New Zealand

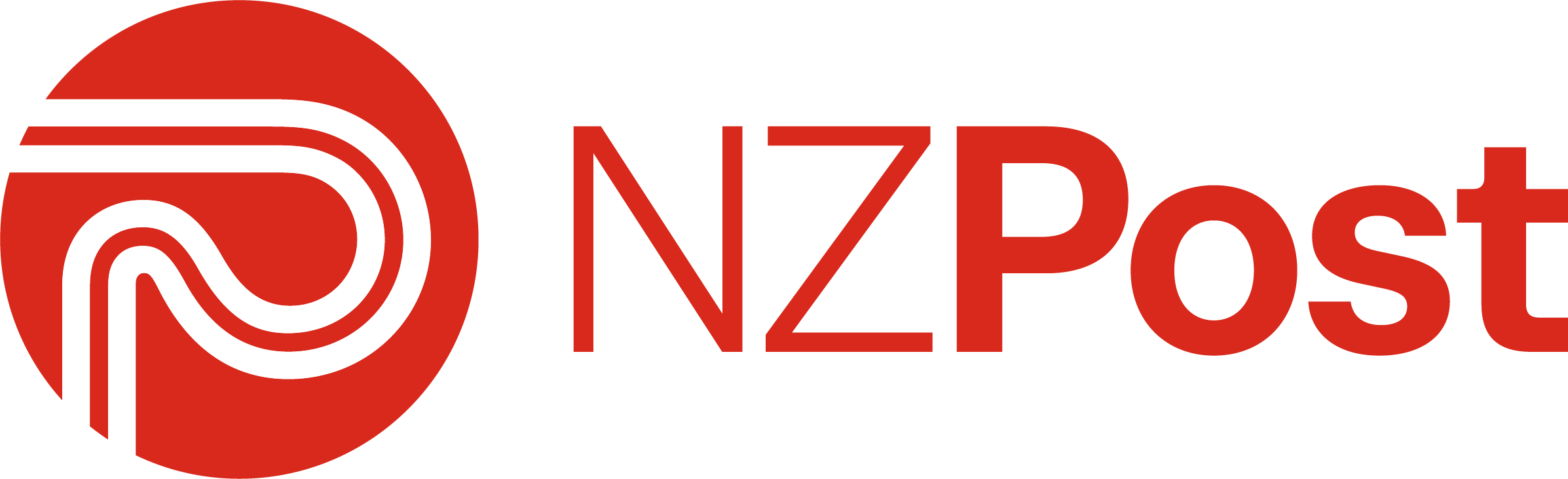
- Formerly: New Zealand Post
- Type: State-owned enterprise
- Industry: Postal service
- Predecessor: New Zealand Post Office
- Founded: 1 April 1987; 39 years ago
- Headquarters: Wellington, New Zealand
- Key people: Carol Campbell (Acting Chair); David Walsh (CEO); Rhonda Richardson (CFO); Minister of Finance; Minister for State Owned Enterprises
- Products: Mail service, retail, service centre, banking, air freight, ocean freight, 3PL warehousing, global logistics
- Revenue: ▲NZ$1.267 billion (2026)
- Operating income: ▲NZ$44 million (2026)
- Net income: ▲NZ$17 million (2026)
- Total assets: ▼NZ$1.50 billion (2026)
- Total equity: ▲NZ$591 million (2026)
- Number of employees: 4,032 FTE (2026)
- Website: nzpost.co.nz

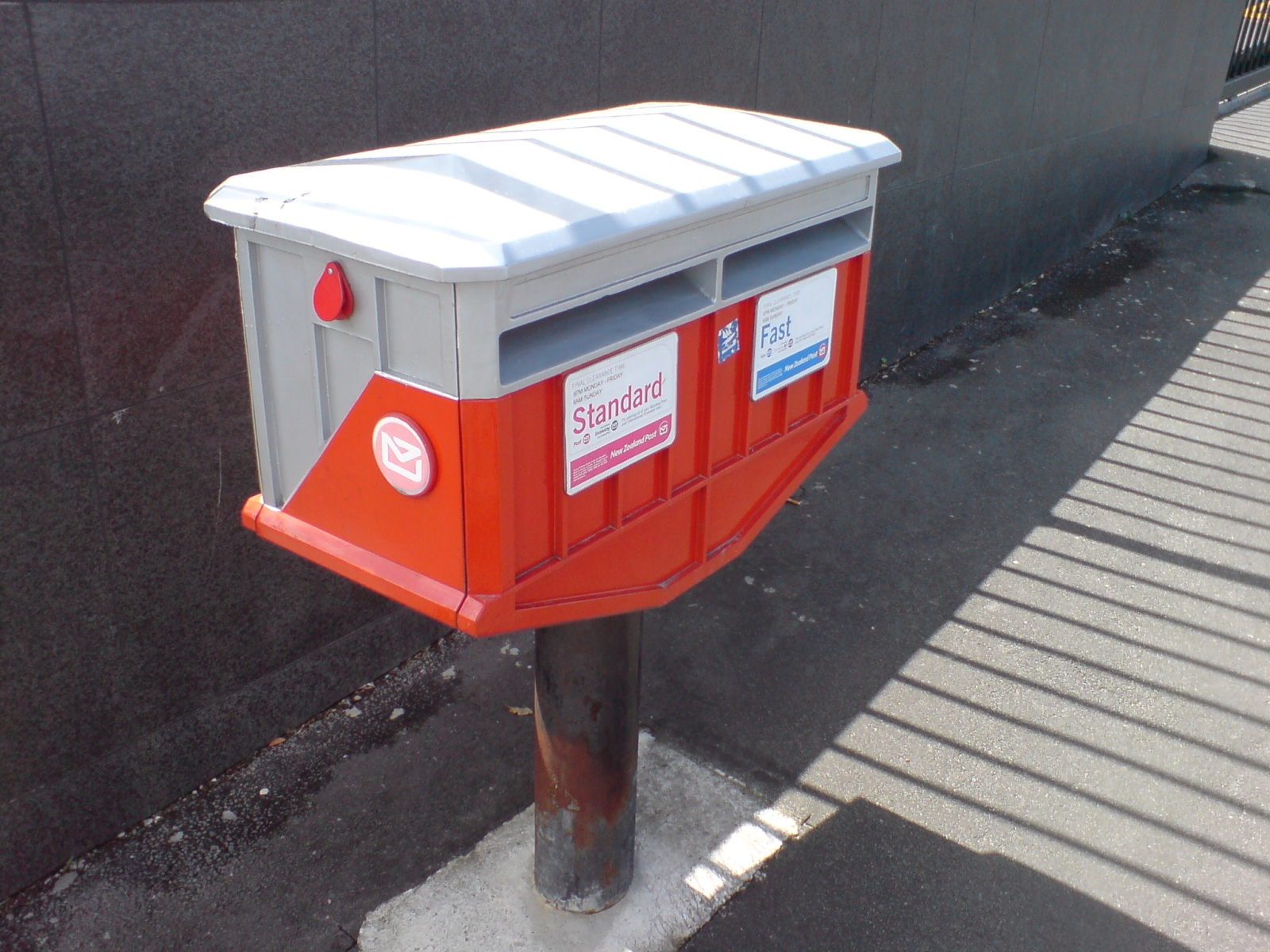
A NZ Post box with slots for two classes of mail

NZ Post (Māori: Tukurau Aotearoa), shortened from New Zealand Post, is a state-owned enterprise responsible for providing most postal services in New Zealand.

New Zealand Post logo used from 2000 to 2021

The New Zealand Post Office, a government agency, provided postal, banking, and telecommunications services in New Zealand until 1987. By the 1980s, however, economic difficulties made the government reconsider how it delivered postal services. For example, in 1987–1988, the postal division lost NZ$50 million. In 1985, the Labour Party government under Prime Minister David Lange launched a review, led by New Zealand Motor Corporation CEO Roy Mason and KPMG New Zealand Chairman Michael Morris, to find solutions to the Post Office's problems. In its final report, the team recommended transforming the New Zealand Post Office into three state-owned enterprises. The government in 1986 decided to follow the Mason-Morris review's recommendations, and passed through parliament the State-Owned Enterprises Act, which corporatised several government agencies into state-owned enterprises. The Post Office's corporatisation was then completed with the 1987 passage of the Postal Services Act. The two acts broke up the New Zealand Post Office into three corporations: the postal service firm New Zealand Post Limited, the savings bank Post Office Bank Limited, later rebranded as PostBank, and the telecommunications company Telecom New Zealand Limited. Today, only NZ Post remains a state-owned enterprise, as PostBank and Telecom were privatised in 1989 and 1990, respectively.

In its first year of operation, New Zealand Post turned the losses of previous years into a NZ$72 million profit.

A year after the 1987 Post Office Act, the Lange Government declared its plan to fully privatise the post. To prepare for privatisation, it decided to gradually reduce NZ Post's monopoly. When it was corporatised in 1987, New Zealand Post had a monopoly for mail up to 500 grams and NZ$1.75 value. This was first reduced to $1.35, then $1, and finally 80 cents. The government also let NZ Post downsize by closing a third of its locations. In 1991–1992, another review came out in support of the government's privatisation plan. However, by the end of 1993 the government abandoned its plan because of public opposition.

New Zealand Post began its life with 1,244 post offices, later rebranded as PostShops, of which 906 were full post offices and 338 were postal agencies. On 5 February 1988, 581 post offices or bank branches were downsized or closed, after government subsidies expired. As of March 1998, there were 297 PostShops and 705 Post Centres. However, there are now more outlets than before corporatisation, with 2,945 other retailers of postage stamps.

There was a reduction in the "real" price of postage, with a nominal drop of the standard letter postage rate from 45 cents to 40 cents in 1996, and restoration of the 45 cent rate in 2004. Since then the cost has risen to 50 cents in 2007, to 60 cents in 2010, to 70 cents in 2012, to 80 cents in 2014, to $1 in 2016, to $1.20 in 2018, to $1.30 in 2019, to $1.40 in 2020, to $1.50 in 2021, to $1.70 in 2022, to $2.00 in 2023 and $2.30 in 2024, amidst significant declines in mail volumes.

== Regulation ==
The Lange government's Postal Services Act 1987 reduced the monopoly of New Zealand Post to a limit of $1.75 and 500 grams. It was gradually reduced to 80 cents in December 1991 until the 1998 legislation took effect.

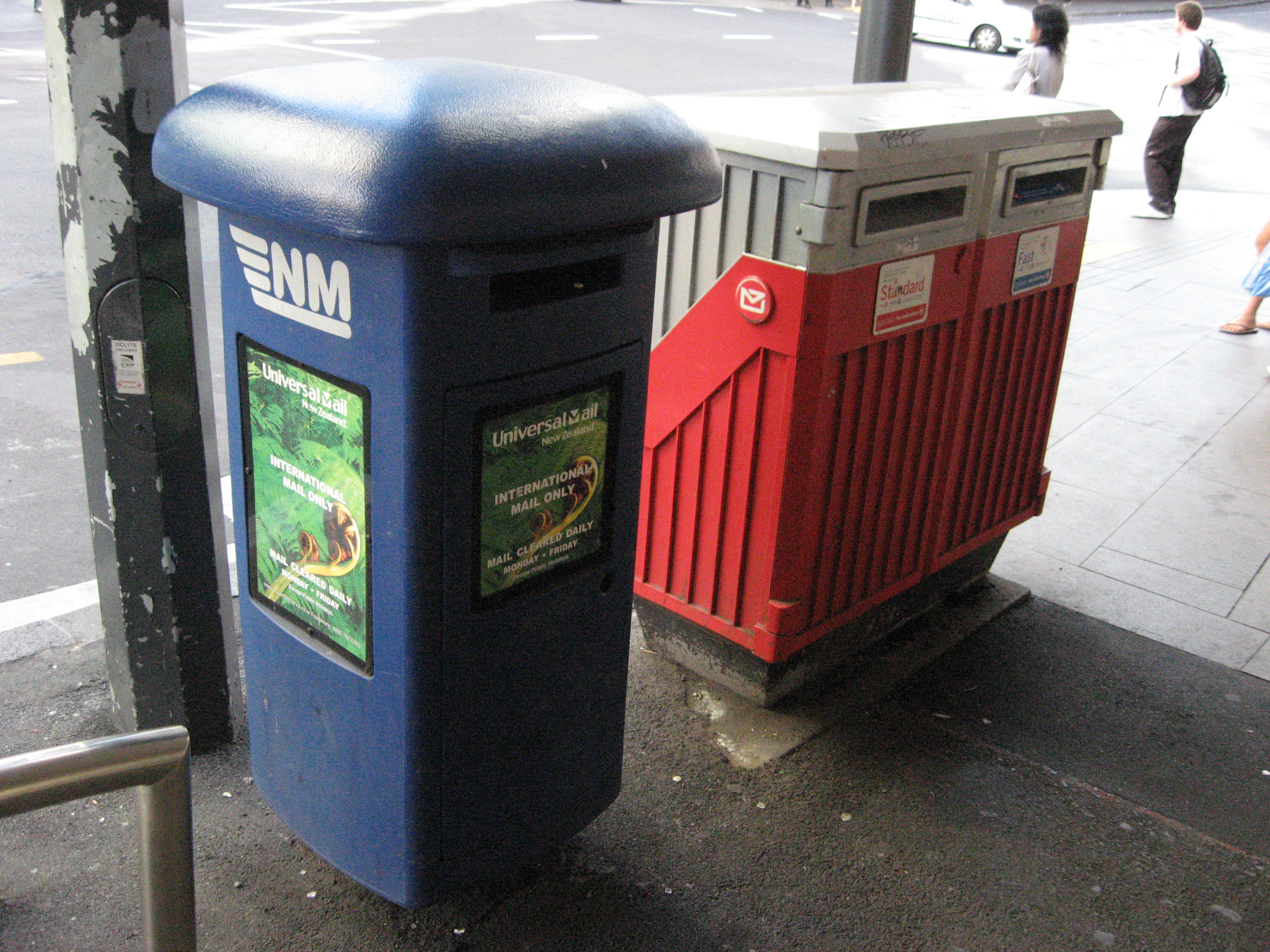
Since the deregulation of the postal sector, different postal operators can install mail collection boxes in New Zealand's streets.

The Postal Services Act 1998, passed by a National-New Zealand First coalition government, repealed the 1987 Act. The new law provides for any person to become a registered postal operator by applying to the Ministry of Economic Development (now Ministry of Business, Innovation and Employment). Registration as a postal operator is compulsory for letters with postage less than 80 cents. Despite the Act, government regulation of the company still requires it to maintain certain minimum service levels, such as frequency of delivery.

New Zealand Post's exclusive right to be the 'sole operator' under the Act for the purposes of the Universal Postal Union (UPU) expired on 1 April 2003. For practical purposes, this meant another postal operator could theoretically issue stamps identified simply as 'New Zealand' with UPU membership. At around the same time, New Zealand Post adopted a fern-shaped identifying mark on its postage stamps, to be used on the majority of its future issues. As of 2024, New Zealand Post is one of three mail delivery providers in New Zealand to issue stamps, the others being its primary postal competitor DX Mail and the significantly smaller Whitestone Post.

Since 1998, NZ Post has been legally obliged to deliver six days a week. However, in 2013, the company outlined a plan to reduce this to three, in the wake of falling mail volumes. Prime Minister John Key backed the idea, saying people "genuinely understand that the world is changing".

NZ Post is legally obligated to maintain a certain service level under a deed of understanding it signed with the New Zealand Government following the post's corporatisation in 1987. According to the agreement, last amended in 2013, New Zealand Post has to operate at least 880 service points where basic postal services are available, and within this network 240 so-called “Personal Assistance Service Points,” where additional postal services, such as priority or parcel services, are available. As of 30 June 2016, New Zealand Post maintained 987 service points, 511 which were personal assistance service points. In all, the post operated 882 retail locations in mid-2016. The standard of signature/non-signature parcel delivery services, varies with their customers sometimes left a mailbox card instructing them to pick up parcels from the nearest NZ Post Depot or if a small address discrepancy/address damage is discovered, the parcel is invariably returned to the sender, usually with no efforts directed toward telephoning, emailing or looking up the recipient in a directory, whist more effort is prioritised into delivering miss-addressed letters.

== Operations ==
=== Mail and courier services ===
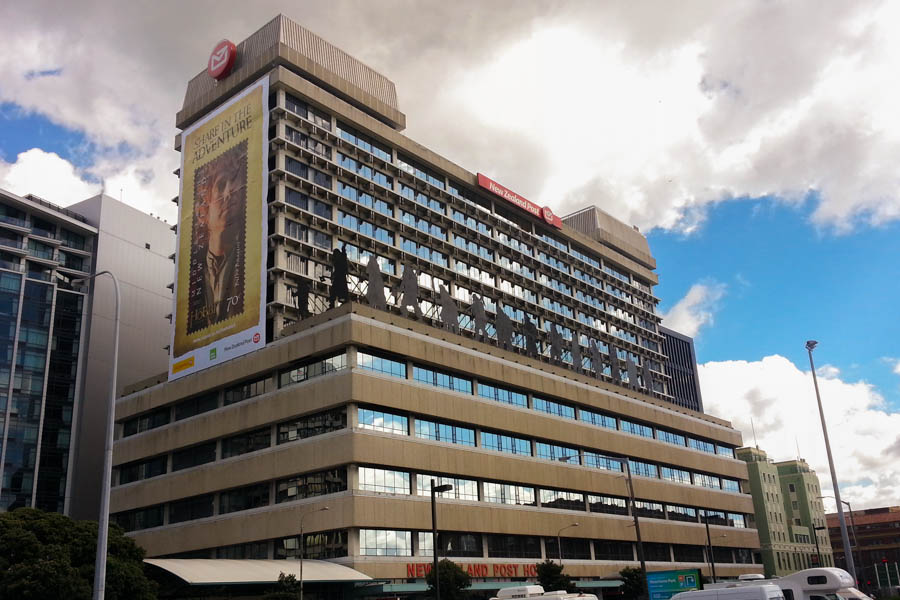
New Zealand Post headquarters in Wellington.

In 1989, New Zealand Post established CourierPost, a nationwide courier company designed to protect the company's parcel business from private competition. In 1991 it purchased Speedlink Parcels, formerly run by the New Zealand Railways when it was sold during privatisation. By 1998 CourierPost had become the number one player in the express courier market.

In 1999, New Zealand Post launched a 50:50 joint operation with Blue Star. The new brand – Books and More – combined bookshop operations with the more traditional PostShop services. After acquiring 100% of the company in 2004 (by this stage the other 50% had been owned by WH Smith, owner of Whitcoulls bookshops) the entire operation was eventually sold to Paper Plus in 2005 and by 2006 all had been re-branded as Take Note.

In 2002, New Zealand Post, as part of government policy, opened the bank Kiwibank Limited in the majority of its PostShop and Books and More (now Take Note) branches. Kiwibank is wholly owned by New Zealand Post through subsidiaries.

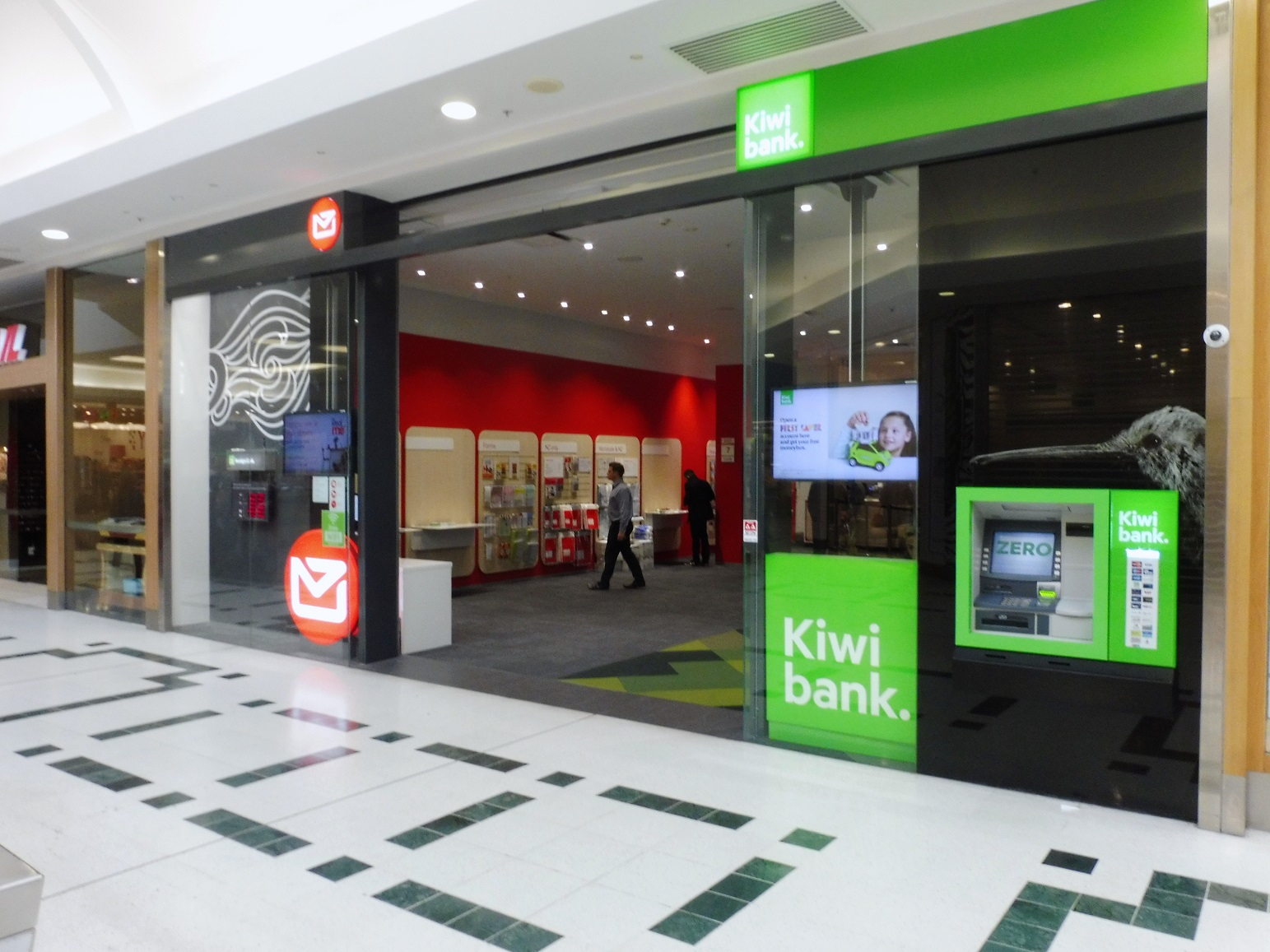
New Zealand Post and Kiwibank shop at The Palms shopping centre in Shirley, Christchurch

In 2002, NZ Post bought The ECN Group which is now New Zealand Post's corporate venturing arm. Its purpose is to develop and market technologies and services that may replace or enhance New Zealand Post's traditional services. The ECN Group focuses on B2B messaging, business process management and systems integration, with a presence in New Zealand, Australia and Asia.

New Zealand Post also owned 35% of IT firm Datacom Group until December 2012.

New Zealand Post also ran the Electoral Enrolment Centre as a business unit under contract to the Ministry of Justice. Its function was to compile and maintain all electoral rolls for parliamentary and local government elections.

On 6 July 2010, New Zealand Post registered a 100 percent stake in Localist Limited, a local directory and social media site focusing initially on the Auckland region. This holding was sold in 2014 in a management buyout led by the then CEO, Christine Domecq.

One of the ways New Zealand Post is trying to make up for lost revenue due to fewer people sending letters is partnering with other companies. The Post on 3 April 2017 announced that it will work with fast food restaurant chain KFC to have postal drivers deliver KFC's food to customers. The partnership will be piloted in the northern city of Tauranga, then expanded to more locations across New Zealand.

On 24 June 2021, New Zealand Post announced a new logo and rebranding to unite their NZ Post, Pace and CourierPost brands into one brand in order to reduce confusion among customers. This rebranding exercise costs NZ$15 million and will take place over a period of three years; focusing on the repainting of courier vans. The company is also spending $170 million to establish new processing centres in Auckland, Wellington, and Christchurch.

In late June 2023, NZ Post chief executive David Walsh announced plans to lay off 750 jobs over the next five years due to declining mail volume. Total annual mail volume had declined from over 1 billion items in 2003 to around 220 million items in 2023. In late March 2024, NZ Post confirmed it would proceed with plans to lay off 750 workers over the next five years due to declining mail volume.

In early April 2024, NZ Post confirmed that it would stop delivering newspapers and parcels to rural addresses on Saturdays from 29 June 2024, with the exception of 17 rural delivery runs that would be phased out by June 2025.

In early November 2024, the Ministry of Business, Innovation and Employment (MBIE) proposed five changes to NZ Post's services including reducing the frequency of mail deliveries in both urban and rural areas; gradually reducing the number of postal outlets from 880 to 400; establishing cluster and community boxes for new addresses; converting existing delivery points to community points at a rate of 5% per year; and reducing the review period from five to three years. The Postal Worker's Union president John Maynard expressed concerns about NZ Post's proposal to stop delivering to individual mail boxes.

=== Transport ===
Early mail was carried on foot and by ship. By 1875, of 330 mail routes, 83 used carts, or coaches. From 1878, post was carried in travelling post offices on New Zealand Railways, with sorting being done on the train. The last train ran on 5 September 1971, after which the Silver Star train took over Auckland-Wellington services.

Air transport was first used in 1919, and regular carriage by internal airlines began on 16 March 1936. Until 2016, NZ Post had a Boeing 737-300 and two Fokker 27 planes, which were replaced by three Boeing 737-400, with mail carried in containers.

An 20 hp (15 kW) 12 mph (19 km/h)12mph Albion petrol lorry began carrying mail between Wellington post office and the wharf from early in September 1909. Another arrived in 1911. By 1973, the Post Office had 1,600 Bedford J trucks.

In 2004, New Zealand Post announced the formation of Express Couriers Ltd (ECL), a 50:50 joint venture with courier company DHL. In 2008, New Zealand Post and DHL commenced a similar joint venture in Australia called Parcel Direct Group Pty Limited (PDG). In 2012, New Zealand Post purchased DHL's holdings in these two companies. ECL operates extensive courier and logistics services throughout New Zealand and encompasses the CourierPost, Pace, RoadStar and Contract Logistics brands.

From 2016, electric Paxters were introduced for local deliveries. On average, they use 8.4 kWh (30 MJ) a day. By 2022, there were 415 of them. In 2022 a Hyundai Xcient hydrogen-powered truck was introduced.

In 2022, NZ Post acquired Fliway Group, one of New Zealand's largest transport and logistics providers.

=== Sorting ===
On 12 October 2022, NZ Post opened a new "Super Depot" of over 10,000 square metres in Wellington capable of automatically sorting 11,000 parcels per hour which was previously done by hand. The new automated sorting system uses optical character recognition (OCR) capable of reading hand writing as well as barcode scanning to determine where a package should go. The sorting technology was designed and produced in partnership with Daifuku Oceania.

=== Issue of stamps ===
NZ Post is responsible for stamp design and stamp production. From 1 April 1998 until 1 April 2003, only New Zealand Post was allowed to issue postage stamps that bear the words "New Zealand," according to New Zealand law. Each year the Post's stamp business unit sets how many stamps it will issue and what the stamps will depict. The Post considers suggestions from New Zealand citizens and people around the world when deciding the subject of stamps. It also works with organisations to create commemorative stamps. For example, in 2014, the Post collaborated with Air New Zealand to issue a stamp for the airline's 75th anniversary.

Once a decision on the stamp's subject is made, the Post asks at least two designers to draw a sketch, from which the final design is chosen. There are four things each stamp design must include: the stamp's denomination, the words New Zealand, a fern, one of the country's unofficial symbols, and a description of what the stamp depicts. Finally, the Post uses printers from around the world to print the stamps–it does not print them itself.

New Zealand's first stamp was issued by NZ Post's predecessor, the Post Office Department of the New Zealand government, in 1855. The stamp depicted Queen Victoria, and was printed in one penny, two pence and one shilling denominations.

== Other NZ postal operators ==
Other operators in the privatised New Zealand postal market include:

- DX Mail
- Pete's Post
- New Zealand Mail
- Whitestone Post

== See also ==
- Postcodes in New Zealand
- Royal Mail
- Canada Post
- Australia Post
- List of national postal services#Oceania
