= 2020 New Zealand general election =

- 17 October 2020

All 120 seats in the House of Representatives 61 seats needed for a majority
- Opinion polls
- Registered: 3,549,580
- Turnout: 2,919,073 (82.24% ▲2.49 pp)
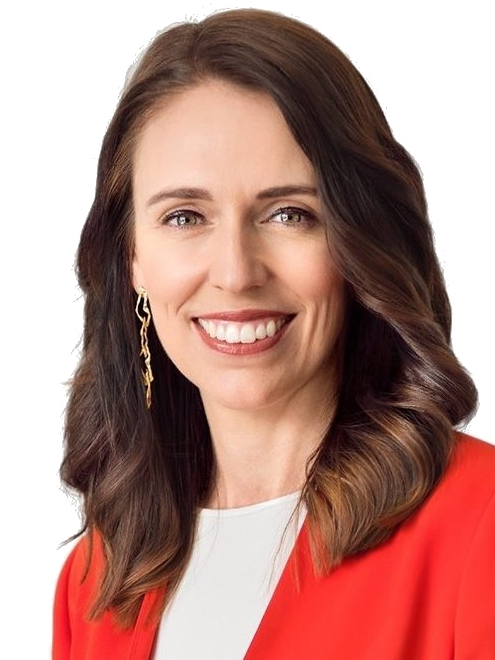

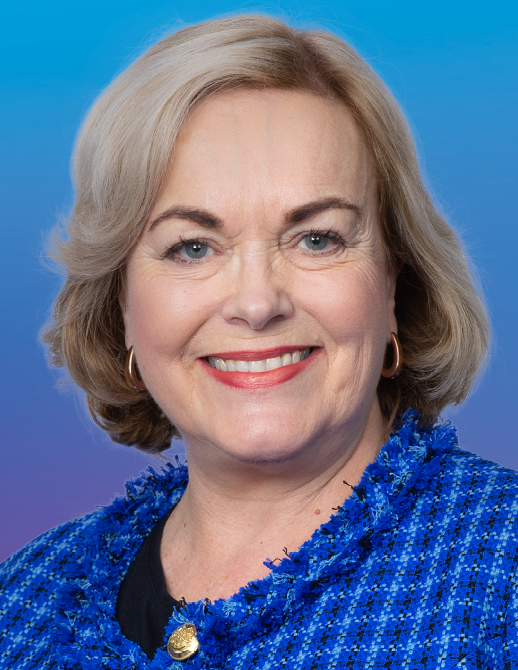

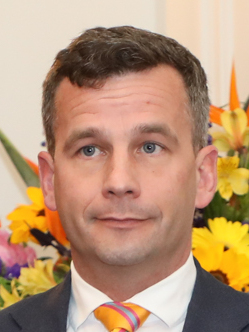

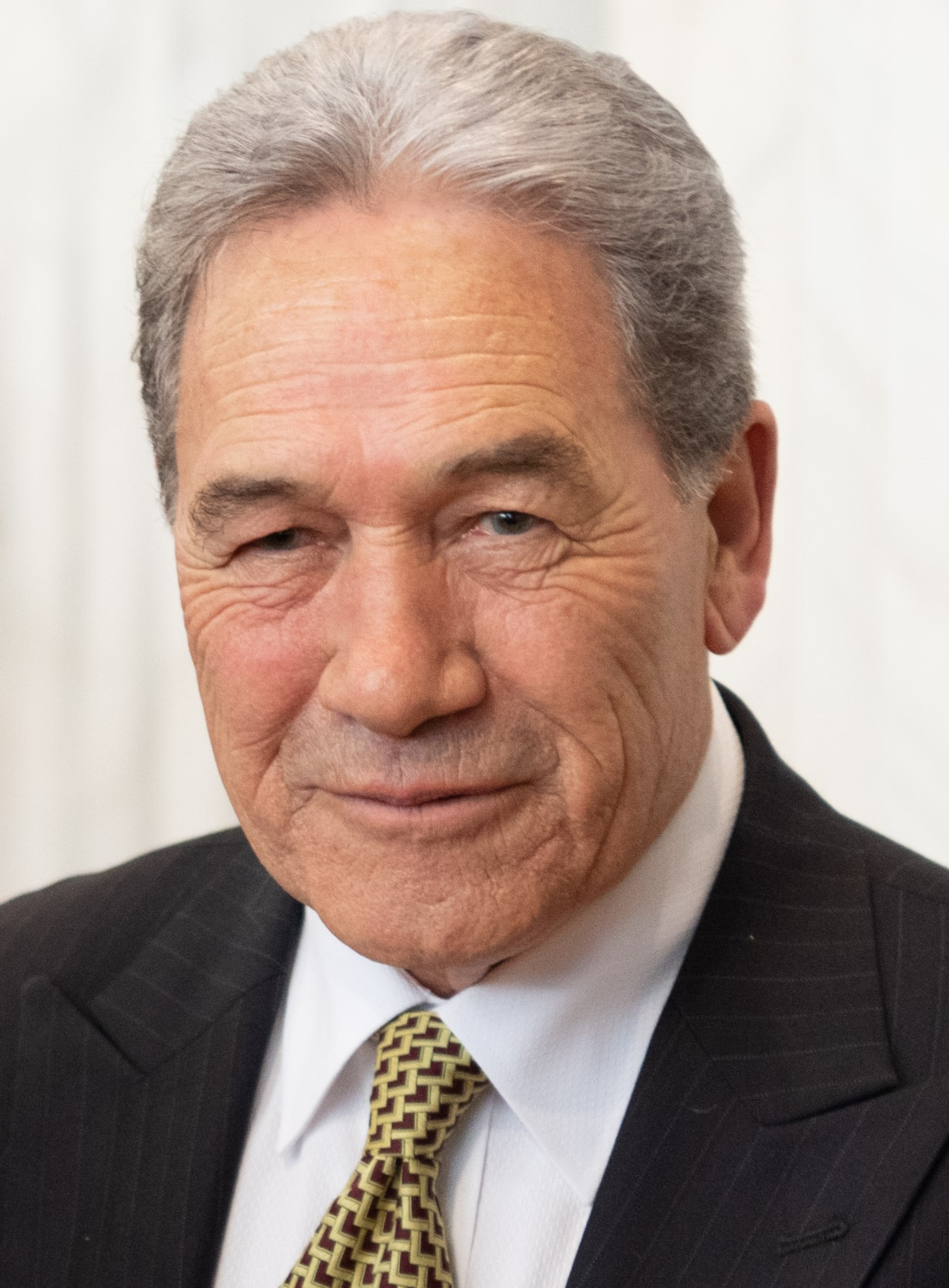
| | First party | Second party | Third party |
|---|---|---|---|
| Leader | Jacinda Ardern | Judith Collins | James Shaw; Marama Davidson |
| Party | Labour | National | Green |
| Leader since | 1 August 2017 | 14 July 2020 | 30 May 2015; 8 April 2018 |
| Leader's seat | Mount Albert | Papakura | List |
| Last election | 46 seats 36.89% | 56 seats 44.45% | 8 seats 6.27% |
| Seats before | 46 | 54 | 8 |
| Seats won | 65 | 33 | 10 |
| Seat change | ▲19 | ▼23 | ▲2 |
| Party vote | 1,443,545 | 738,275 | 226,757 |
| Percentage | 50.01% | 25.58% | 7.86% |
| Swing | ▲13.12 pp | ▼18.87 pp | ▲1.59 pp |
| | Fourth party | Fifth party | Sixth party |
| Leader | David Seymour | John Tamihere; Debbie Ngarewa-Packer | Winston Peters |
| Party | ACT | Māori Party | NZ First |
| Leader since | 4 October 2014 | 15 April 2020 | 18 July 1993 |
| Leader's seat | Epsom | Ran in Tāmaki Makaurau (lost) (Note: In late October, after preliminary election results suggested that the only Māori Party seat in parliament would be the Waiariki electorate, held by Rawiri Waititi, the party confirmed Rawiri as its new co-leader, replacing John Tamihere.); List | List (lost) |
| Last election | 1 seat 0.50% | 0 seats 1.18% | 9 seats 7.20% |
| Seats before | 1 | 0 | 9 |
| Seats won | 10 | 2 | 0 |
| Seat change | ▲9 | ▲2 | ▼9 |
| Party vote | 219,031 | 33,630 | 75,020 |
| Percentage | 7.59% | 1.17% | 2.60% |
| Swing | ▲7.08 pp | ▼0.01 pp | ▼4.60 pp |
- Results by electorate, shaded by winning margin
Prime Minister and coalition before election
Jacinda Ardern (Labour)
Labour—NZ First (C&S: Green)
Subsequent Prime Minister and coalition
Jacinda Ardern (Labour)
Labour (C&S: Green)

The 2020 New Zealand general election was held on Saturday 17 October 2020 to determine the composition of the 53rd New Zealand Parliament. Voters elected 120 members to the House of Representatives, 72 from single-member electorates and 48 from closed party lists. Two referendums, one on the personal use of cannabis and one on euthanasia, were also held on the same day. Official results of the election and referendums were released on 6 November.

The governing Labour Party, led by incumbent Prime Minister Jacinda Ardern, won the election in a landslide victory against the National Party, led by Judith Collins. Labour won 65 seats, enough for a majority government. It marked the first time that a party won enough seats to govern alone since the mixed-member proportional representation (MMP) system was introduced in 1996. Labour also achieved the highest percentage of the party vote (50.01%) since MMP was introduced, winning a plurality in 71 of the 72 electorates (Epsom being the sole exception). This is also the best nationwide result in the popular vote for a main party since 1951, the most seats any party has won since 1990 and the first time Labour won an absolute majority of the vote since 1946. Conversely, this election was the second-worst result for the National Party, which performed more poorly only in the 2002 general election.

With the election being highly centred around the government's praised response to the COVID-19 pandemic, it led to the unprecedented flipping of traditionally National-voting seats to Labour, often with very comfortable margins. Examples included the rural seats of Wairarapa, East Coast, Ōtaki and Rangitata, the latter having never previously voted for Labour. In another blow to National's heartlands, every city except Auckland and Tauranga gave their seats entirely to Labour. In a surprise victory, the left-wing environmentalist Green Party's Chlöe Swarbrick won the Auckland Central seat vacated by National's retiring Nikki Kaye with a margin of 1,068 votes over Labour's Helen White. The right-wing libertarian ACT Party and the Greens both increased their number of seats due to the collapse of National's support base. The Māori Party, representing the cause of indigenous rights, re-entered Parliament with two seats after Rawiri Waititi won the Waiariki electorate. Populist nationalist party New Zealand First, led by Deputy Prime Minister Winston Peters in coalition with Labour, suffered its worst-ever result, losing all its seats.

Ardern moved the Labour Party further to the centre during its campaign, promising to cut spending during the remainder of COVID-19 recession and controversially cancelling the government's promise to make the standard three years of tertiary education tuition-free. Doing so alienated some left-wing Labour supporters, giving the Green Party a boost in seat numbers and contributing to their victory in Auckland Central. While results of opinion polls early in the year were close between the two major parties, Ardern and the Labour Government were praised for their response to the COVID-19 pandemic in New Zealand. Following the Level 4 lockdown in March 2020, polls began to suggest that Labour could either attain a majority government or could govern with confidence-and-supply from the Greens. In contrast, the leadership of the National Party changed twice in less than three months, unable to improve its poor polling results after collapsing in April 2020. Heading a campaign widely perceived as centrist or centre-leaning, Labour gained support from a large demographic of moderate swing voters, many of whom had previously voted for National under John Key. Approximately 16% of Labour's voters had voted for National in the previous election.

== Background ==
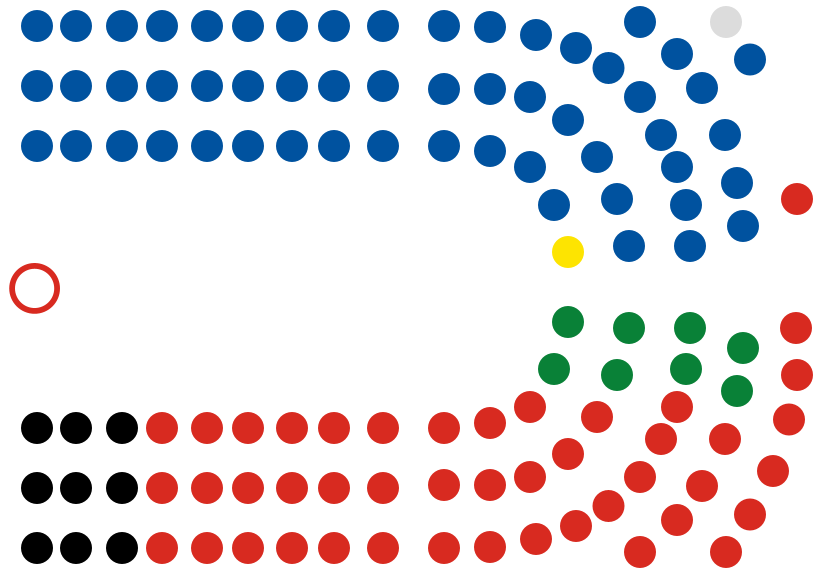
Parliamentary makeup prior to the 2020 election. Government: Labour (46) NZ First (9) Confidence and supply: Green (8) Opposition: National (55) ACT (1) Independent (1)

The final results of the 23 September 2017 election gave National 56 seats, while Labour and the Greens combined had 54 seats. New Zealand First won 9 seats and held the balance of power; it was in a position to give either National or Labour the 61 seats needed to form a government. On 19 October 2017, Winston Peters, leader of New Zealand First, announced that he would form a coalition government with Labour. On the same day, James Shaw, leader of the Green Party, announced that his party would give confidence and supply to a Labour–NZ First government. Thus, Labour regained power after nine years in opposition, ending the Fifth National Government which had been in power for three terms (2008–2017). The 2017 election also marked the first time under MMP in New Zealand that a party led a government without commanding the plurality of the party vote.

On 22 May 2020, a leadership election occurred following two poor polling results for the National Party, in which Todd Muller replaced Simon Bridges as leader and Leader of the Opposition, and Nikki Kaye replaced Paula Bennett as deputy leader of the party. Muller himself then resigned on 14 July 2020 citing health reasons, leading to another leadership election later that day, in which Collins was voted into the National leadership position.

== Electoral system ==
New Zealand uses a mixed-member proportional (MMP) voting system to elect the House of Representatives. Each voter gets two votes, one for a political party (the party vote) and one for a local candidate (the electorate vote). Political parties that meet the threshold (5% of the party vote or one electorate seat) receive seats in the House in proportion to the percentage of the party vote they receive. 72 of the 120 seats are filled by the MPs elected from the electorates, with the winner in each electorate determined by the first-past-the-post method (i.e. most votes wins). The remaining 48 seats are filled by candidates from each party's closed party list. If a party wins more electorates than seats it is entitled to under the party vote, an overhang results; in this case, the House will add extra seats to cover the overhang.

A political party or parties with the support of the majority of members in the House form the Government. Prior to this election, from the introduction of MMP in 1996 no single party had won enough votes to win an outright majority of seats; when no party has commanded a majority, parties have had to negotiate with other parties to form a coalition government or a minority government.

=== Electorate boundaries ===
The 2014 electoral boundaries showing electorates out of tolerance following the 2018 census and Māori electoral option. Orange electorates were more than 5% above quota and therefore had to drop population. Blue electorates were more than 5% below quota and therefore had to add population.

Electorate boundaries for the next election are required to be redrawn after each New Zealand census. The most recent census was held in 2018.

By law, the number of South Island general electorates is fixed at 16, with the number of North Island general electorates and Māori electorates increasing or decreasing in proportion to the population. Each electorate must have the same population, with a tolerance of plus or minus five percent. For the 2014 and 2017 elections, there were 48 North Island general electorates and 7 Māori electorates, which, along with the 16 South Island electorates, gives a nationwide total of 71 electorates.

On 23 September 2019, Statistics New Zealand announced that population growth necessitated one additional North Island general electorate, bringing the total number of North Island general electorates to 49 and the overall number of electorates to 72 (reducing the number of list seats available by one). Statistics New Zealand also announced that 11 North Island, three South Island, and two Māori electorates were above 5% tolerance, while five South Island electorates and one Māori electorate were below 5% tolerance.

The Representation Commission undertook a review of electoral boundaries. This review was commenced in October 2019 and was completed in April 2020. The boundaries applied in the 2020 general election, and the subsequent general election. In total, 36 electorates remained unchanged, 35 electorates were modified, and one new electorate created. The most significant boundary changes occurred in the Auckland, Waikato, central Canterbury, and Otago regions, with smaller changes in the Northland and Tasman regions.

The new electorate was created in South Auckland and named Takanini. Taking area from the Hunua, Manurewa, and Papakura electorates, Takanini is predicted to be a National-tilting to marginal electorate. Takanini's creation cascaded existing electorates north through Auckland and south through Waikato. Significant changes to the north include Manukau East taking Sylvia Park and Panmure from Maungakiekie, with the electorate renamed Panmure-Ōtāhuhu; New Lynn taking the Waitakere Ranges from Helensville; Helensville taking Wellsford, Warkworth and the Kowhai Coast from Rodney and Northland, with the electorate renamed Kaipara ki Mahurangi; and Rodney taking Dairy Flat from Helensville and being renamed Whangaparāoa. To the south, Papakura took the entire Hunua electorate east of State Highway 1, in exchange for Hunua taking the northern part of the Waikato electorate as far south as, and including, Te Kauwhata. Hunua subsequently returned to its pre-2008 name, Port Waikato. Waikato took Te Aroha and the remainder of the Matamata-Piako District area from Coromandel, allowing Coromandel to take Ōmokoroa from Bay of Plenty.

In the South Island, Selwyn lost the Rakaia area to Rangitata, Mcleans Island and Christchurch Airport to Ilam, and Hornby South to Wigram. Ilam gained Avonhead from Wigram, allowing Wigram to take Aidanfield from Port Hills, which in turn allowed Port Hills to take the entire Banks Peninsula from Selwyn. Port Hills subsequently returned to its pre-2008 name of Banks Peninsula. Clutha-Southland lost the Tuatapere-Te Waewae area to Invercargill and Balclutha, Milton and the lower Clutha Valley to Dunedin South, while gaining Alexandra, Clyde and the Clutha Valley upstream of Beaumont from Waitaki. Waitaki in turn took the Palmerston area from Dunedin North, allowing Dunedin North to take the Otago Peninsula from Dunedin South. The Otago-Southland boundary changes saw three electorates change names: Clutha-Southland to Southland, Dunedin North to Dunedin, and Dunedin South to Taieri. In the Tasman region, the town of Brightwater moved from Nelson to West Coast-Tasman to bring the latter electorate within quota.

Two electorates had name changes to correct their spelling. Rimutaka was renamed Remutaka in line with its namesake, the Remutaka Range, which was renamed in 2017 as part of a Treaty of Waitangi settlement. The Whangārei electorate was renamed by adding a macron to the second "a".

== Schedule ==
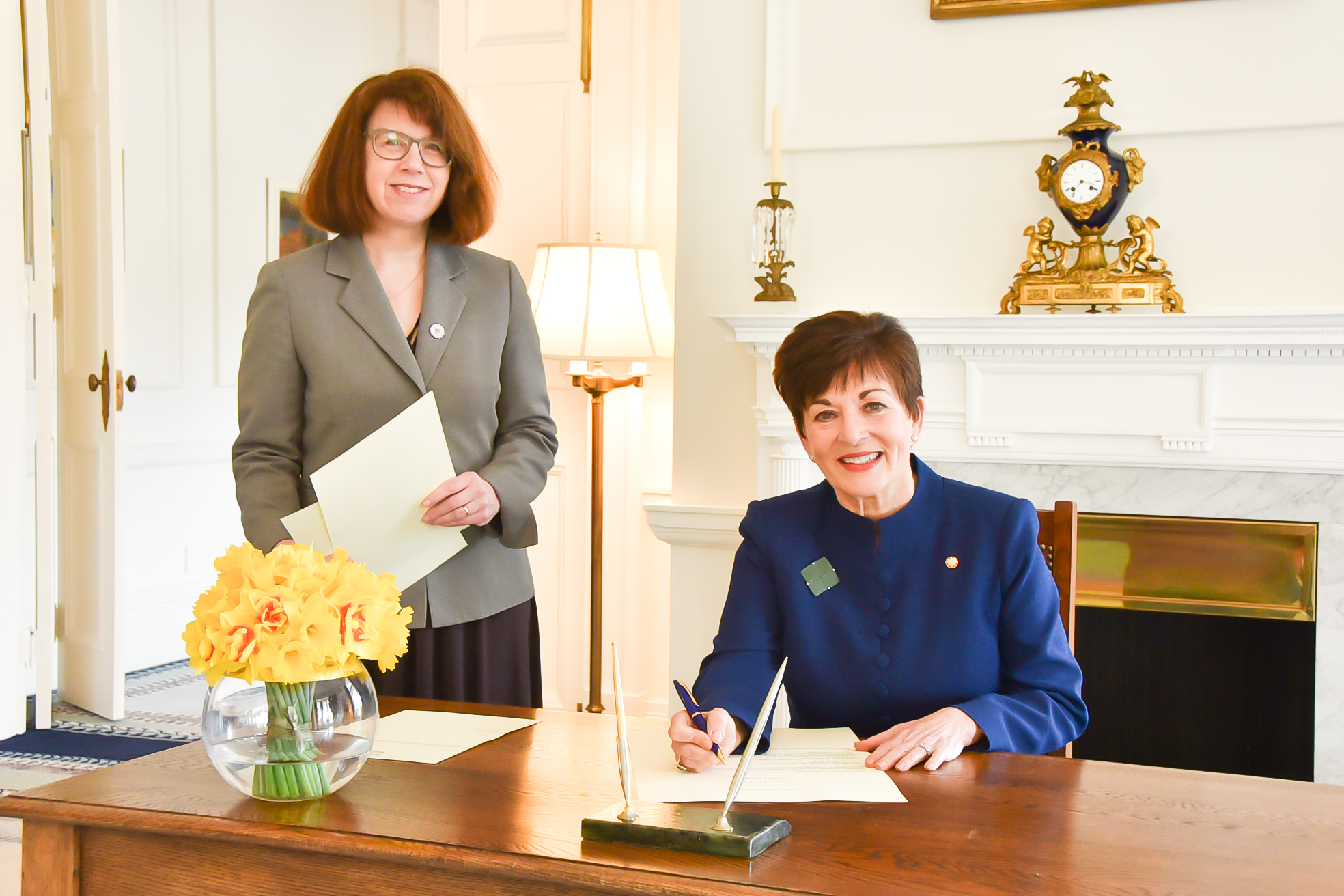
Governor-General Dame Patsy Reddy (right) issues the writ for the election before the chief electoral officer, Alicia Wright (left), on 13 September 2020.

Unless an early election is called or the election date is set to circumvent holding a by-election, a general election is held every three years. The previous election was held on 23 September 2017.

The governor-general (Patsy Reddy) must issue writs for an election within seven days of the expiration or dissolution of the current parliament. Under section 17 of the Constitution Act 1986, parliament expires three years "from the day fixed for the return of the writs issued for the last preceding general election of members of the House of Representatives, and no longer." The writs for the 2017 election were returned on 12 October 2017; as a result, the 52nd Parliament would have to dissolve no later than 12 October 2020. Consequently, the last day for issuance of the writs of election is 19 October 2020. Since the passage of the Electoral Amendment Act 2020, which came into force on 11 March 2020, the writs must be returned within 60 days of their issuance (save for any judicial recount, death of a candidate, or emergency adjournment), which would be 18 December 2020. Because polling day must be on a Saturday, and ten days is required for counting of special votes, the last possible date for this general election is 21 November 2020.

On 28 January 2020, Ardern announced that the election would be held on 19 September, with the 52nd Parliament holding its last sitting day on 6 August and dissolving on 12 August. On 17 August 2020, Ardern delayed the election to 17 October, with the dissolution of Parliament delayed until 6 September. The writ date for the election, which was originally set for 16 August, was subsequently delayed until 13 September. Political parties would have had to be registered by this day to contest the party vote.

The timetable for the general election was as follows:

| 28 January 2020 (Tuesday) | Prime Minister Ardern announces the general election will be held on 19 September. |
| 6 July 2020 (Monday) | Electoral Commission begins enrolment update campaign. |
| 18 July 2020 (Saturday) | Election hoardings may be erected (subject to local council rules). |
| 17 August 2020 (Monday) | Prime Minister Ardern changes the election date to 17 October due to the COVID-19 pandemic. |
| 18 August 2020 (Tuesday) | The regulated election advertising period begins. |
| 6 September 2020 (Sunday) | The 52nd Parliament is dissolved. |
| 13 September 2020 (Sunday) | Writ day – Governor-General issues formal direction to the Electoral Commission to hold the election. Last day to ordinarily enrol to vote (late enrolments must cast special votes); Official campaigning begins; radio and television advertising begins |
| 17 September 2020 (Thursday) | Deadline (12:00) for registered parties to lodge bulk nominations of candidates and party lists. |
| 18 September 2020 (Friday) | Deadline (12:00) for individual candidates to lodge nominations. |
| 30 September 2020 (Wednesday) | Overseas voting begins |
| 3 October 2020 (Saturday) | Advance voting begins |
| 16 October 2020 (Friday) | Advance and overseas voting ends. Last day to enrol to vote (except in-person at polling places). The regulated election advertising period ends; all election advertising must be taken down by 23:59. |
| 17 October 2020 (Saturday) | Election day – polling places open 09:00 to 19:00. People may enrol in-person at polling places. Preliminary election results released progressively after 19:00 |
| 30 October 2020 (Friday) | Preliminary referendum results released |
| 6 November 2020 (Friday) | Official election and referendum results declared |
| 20 November 2020 (Friday) | Writ for election returned; official declaration of elected members (subject to judicial recounts) |
| 25 November 2020 (Wednesday) | The 53rd Parliament meets for the first time |

=== Impact of the COVID-19 pandemic ===
The original date of 19 September was announced before the COVID-19 pandemic had reached New Zealand. In April 2020, the National Party doubted that the public would be ready for an election in September, and New Zealand First leader Winston Peters called for the election to be delayed to 21 November. In May 2020, Ardern said she did not intend to change the date of the election and Chief Electoral Officer Alicia Wright said that the Electoral Commission was working to the dates originally set by the Prime Minister.

After new cases of community transmission in Auckland were reported on 11 August 2020, with the COVID-19 alert level being raised to level 3 in the Auckland region and level 2 elsewhere, there were growing calls to delay the dissolution of Parliament and the election. The following day, Collins called for the election to be delayed until at least after November with the aim of allowing parties more time to campaign, and all major political parties suspended their campaigns. Delaying the dissolution of parliament beyond 12 October 2020, and therefore the election date beyond 28 November 2020, would require a legislative amendment. As the length of the parliamentary term is entrenched, such an amendment would require a 75% supermajority to pass.

On 12 August 2020, Prime Minister Ardern delayed the dissolution of Parliament until 17 August and was seeking advice from the Electoral Commission regarding the election timeline. On 17 August, Ardern announced that the general election would be pushed back to 17 October while the dissolution of Parliament would be delayed until 6 September.

The Chief Electoral Officer has powers under the Electoral Act to delay polling at some or all polling places for up to three days due to unforeseen circumstances. This can be extended for up to seven days at a time following consultation with the Prime Minister and the Leader of the Opposition.

== Parties and candidates ==
Political parties registered with the Electoral Commission can contest the general election as a party. To register, parties must have at least 500 financial members, an auditor, and an appropriate party name. A registered party may submit a party list to contest the party vote, and can have a party campaign expenses limit in addition to limits on individual candidates' campaigns. Unregistered parties and independents can contest the electorate vote only.

Seventeen of the eighteen registered parties submitted a list and contested the general election. The Mana Party did not submit a party list or apply for a broadcasting allocation, and has endorsed and offered its resources to the Māori Party.

| Party | Leader(s) | Founded | Ideology | 2017 result | 2017 election result | Seats before election | Status |
|---|---|---|---|---|---|---|---|
| National | Judith Collins | 1936 | Liberal conservatism | 44.45% | 56 / 120 | 54 / 120 | Opposition |
| Labour | Jacinda Ardern | 1916 | Social democracy | 36.89% | 46 / 120 | 46 / 120 | Government |
| NZ First | Winston Peters | 1993 | Nationalism, populism | 7.20% | 9 / 120 | 9 / 120 | Government |
| Green | James Shaw / Marama Davidson | 1990 | Green politics, social democracy | 6.27% | 8 / 120 | 8 / 120 | Government |
| ACT | David Seymour | 1994 | Classical liberalism, right-libertarianism | 0.50% | 1 / 120 | 1 / 120 | Opposition |
| Opportunities (TOP) | Geoff Simmons | 2016 | Radical centrism, environmentalism | 2.44% | 0 | 0 | Extra-parliamentary |
| Māori Party | John Tamihere / Debbie Ngarewa-Packer | 2004 | Māori rights | 1.18% | 0 | 0 | Extra-parliamentary |
| Legalise Cannabis | Maki Herbert / Michael Appleby | 1996 | Cannabis legalisation | 0.31% | 0 | 0 | Extra-parliamentary |
| New Conservative | Leighton Baker | 2011 | Conservatism, right-wing populism | 0.24% | 0 | 0 | Extra-parliamentary |
| Outdoors | Sue Grey / Alan Simmons | 2015 | Environmentalism, conspiracism | 0.06% | 0 | 0 | Extra-parliamentary |
| Social Credit | Chris Leitch | 1953 | Social credit, economic democracy | 0.03% | 0 | 0 | Extra-parliamentary |
| Advance NZ | Jami-Lee Ross / Billy Te Kahika | 2020 | Conspiracism | — | 0 | 0 (Note: Jami-Lee Ross, the leader of Advance, was an incumbent member of parliament, having been elected as a National MP in 2017 before leaving the party. However, officially he was an independent MP and not affiliated with a party.) | Extra-parliamentary |
| Heartland | Mark Ball | 2020 | Agrarianism | — | 0 | 0 | Extra-parliamentary |
| ONE | Edward Shanly / Stephanie Harawira | 2020 | Christian fundamentalism | — | 0 | 0 | Extra-parliamentary |
| Sustainable NZ | Vernon Tava | 2019 | Environmentalism, centrism | — | 0 | 0 | Extra-parliamentary |
| TEA | John Hong / Susanna Kruger | 2020 | Anti-racism, fiscal conservatism | — | 0 | 0 | Extra-parliamentary |
| Vision NZ | Hannah Tamaki | 2019 | Christian nationalism | — | 0 | 0 | Extra-parliamentary |

=== MPs not standing for re-election ===
| Name | Party | Electorate/List | Term in office | Date announced | Notes |
|---|---|---|---|---|---|
| David Carter | National | List | 1994–2020 | 17 October 2018 | |
| Ruth Dyson | Labour | Port Hills | 1993–2020 | 3 March 2019 | |
| Alastair Scott | National | Wairarapa | 2014–2020 | 25 June 2019 | |
| Nathan Guy | National | Ōtaki | 2005–2020 | 30 July 2019 | |
| Clare Curran | Labour | Dunedin South | 2008–2020 | 27 August 2019 | |
| Maggie Barry | National | North Shore | 2011–2020 | 5 November 2019 | |
| Gareth Hughes | Green | List | 2010–2020 | 17 November 2019 | |
| Sarah Dowie | National | Invercargill | 2014–2020 | 11 February 2020 | Initially re-selected as Invercargill candidate |
| Nicky Wagner | National | List | 2005–2020 | 11 February 2020 | |
| Clayton Mitchell | NZ First | List | 2014–2020 | 5 June 2020 | |
| Anne Tolley | National | East Coast | 1999–2002; 2005–2020 | 27 June 2020 | Initially announced on 20 December 2019 as list-only with intention of becoming Speaker of the House |
| Paula Bennett | National | Upper Harbour | 2005–2020 | 29 June 2020 | Initially announced on 14 August 2019 as list-only |
| Hamish Walker | National | Clutha-Southland | 2017–2020 | 8 July 2020 | Was re-selected as candidate for the Southland electorate but resigned after leaking private information of COVID-19 patients. |
| Jian Yang | National | List | 2011–2020 | 10 July 2020 | |
| Nikki Kaye | National | Auckland Central | 2008–2020 | 16 July 2020 | Was re-selected as candidate for the Auckland Central electorate but resigned following the resignation of Todd Muller, to whom she was deputy. |
| Amy Adams | National | Selwyn | 2008–2020 | 16 July 2020 | Announced intention to retire from politics at upcoming election on 25 June 2019, and a new National candidate was subsequently selected for Selwyn. After a leadership change in the National Party, she reversed her decision and announced she would stand again as a list-only candidate. Adams announced her retirement again shortly after Todd Muller resigned as the party leader. |
| Raymond Huo | Labour | List | 2008–2014; 2017–2020 | 21 July 2020 | Initially re-selected as a list-only candidate (rank 26) but later announced he would not contest the election. |
| Iain Lees-Galloway | Labour | Palmerston North | 2008–2020 | 22 July 2020 | Initially re-selected as candidate for Palmerston North and ranked 13 on the Labour Party list, but later announced he would not contest the election after being removed as a Minister for having a consensual, but inappropriate relationship with a former staff member. |

=== MPs standing for re-election as list-only MPs ===
Some incumbents who had previously stood in an electorate (but may have been returned as list representatives) stood as list-only candidates in the 2020 election.

| Name | Party | Electorate/List | Term in office | Date announced | Notes |
|---|---|---|---|---|---|
| Kris Faafoi | Labour | Mana | 2010–present | 8 February 2020 | |
| Paulo Garcia | National | List | 2019–2020 | 11 February 2020 | Stood in the New Lynn electorate at the 2017 election |
| Julie Anne Genter | Green | List | 2011–present | 25 May 2020 | Stood in the Mount Albert electorate at the 2017 election |
| Louisa Wall | Labour | Manurewa | 2008; 2011–present | 29 May 2020 | Faced two challengers at the 30 May reselection as the Labour candidate in Manurewa, but withdrew to stand as a list-only candidate |
| Jami-Lee Ross | Independent (Advance NZ) | Botany | 2011–2020 | 15 September 2020 | Previously a National MP, Ross left that party in 2018 and began sitting as an independent. He announced he would contest Botany for the Advance New Zealand party, but later decided to only seek a list position. |

== Campaigning ==
=== Expense limits and broadcasting allocations ===
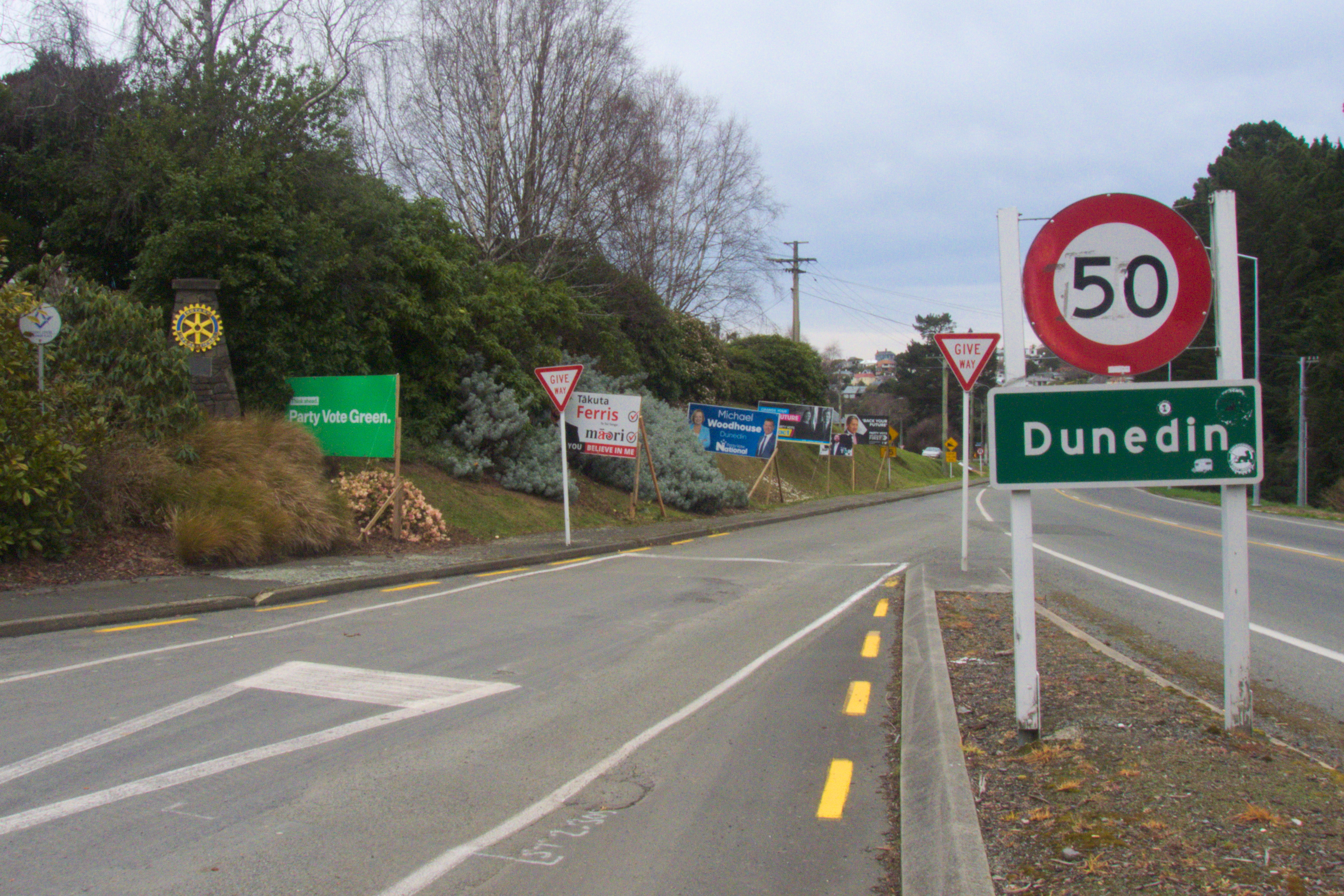
Election hoardings lining the Dunedin Northern Motorway, August 2020

During the regulated period prior to election day, parties and candidates have limits on how much they may spend on election campaigning. The limits are updated every year to reflect inflation. It is illegal in New Zealand to campaign on election day itself, or within 10 metres of an advance polling booth.

For the 2020 general election, the regulated period ran from 18 August to 16 October 2020. Every registered party contending the party vote was permitted to spend $1,199,000 plus $28,200 per electorate candidate on campaigning during the regulated period, excluding radio and television campaigning (broadcasting funding is allocated separately). For example, a registered party with candidates in all 72 electorates was permitted to spend $3,229,400 on campaigning for the party vote. Electorate candidates were permitted to spend $28,200 each on campaigning for the electorate vote.

Registered parties are allocated a separate broadcasting budget for radio and television campaigning. Only money from the broadcasting allocation can be used to purchase airtime; production costs can come from the general election expenses budget. The Electoral Commission determines how much broadcasting funding each party gets, set out by part 6 of the Broadcasting Act 1989. The allocation is based a number of factors including the number of seats in the current Parliament, results of the previous general election and any by-elections since, and support in opinion polls.

A joint statement was released on 9 June 2020 by the Social Credit Party, Māori Party, New Conservative Party, New Zealand Outdoors Party, and Aotearoa Legalise Cannabis Party in which they condemn the broadcasting allocations and call for reform.

An initial broadcasting statement was released from the Electoral Commission on 29 May 2020, including parties that have not yet registered but intend to. The broadcasting allocation was revised on 11 September 2020, redistributing funds from parties that failed to register in time for the election. For comparison, the cost of a 30-second slot on TVNZ in October 2020 ranged from $250 in overnight slots up to $22,000 for slots during the 1 News at 6pm bulletin.

| Party | Broadcasting allocation (NZD) |
|---|---|
| National | $1,335,255 |
| Labour | $1,249,111 |
| Green | $323,046 |
| NZ First | $323,046 |
| ACT | $150,755 |
| Māori Party | $150,755 |
| Opportunities | $150,755 |
| Advance NZ | $64,609 |
| Legalise Cannabis | $64,609 |
| New Conservative | $64,609 |
| ONE | $53,840 |
| Outdoors | $53,840 |
| Social Credit | $53,840 |
| Sustainable NZ | $53,840 |
| Vision NZ | $53,840 |

Third-party promoters, such as trade unions and lobby groups, can campaign during the regulated period. The maximum expense limit for the election is $338,000 for those promoters registered with the Electoral Commission, and $13,600 for unregistered promoters. As of 29 September 2020, the following third-party promoters were registered for the general election (i.e. excluding those solely registered for one or both of the referendums).

- ActionStation
- Brook Valley Community Group
- Cannabis Answers
- New Zealand Council of Trade Unions
- Council of Licensed Firearms Owners
- New Zealand Educational Institute
- Every Kiwi Vote Counts
- Family First New Zealand
- First Union
- Forest and Bird
- Hobson's Pledge
- JustSpeak
- Post Primary Teachers' Association
- New Zealand Public Service Association
- Right to Life New Zealand
- SAFE
- New Zealand Taxpayers' Union
- Victoria University of Wellington Students' Association
- Voice for Life

=== Party campaigns ===
After the announcement of 19 September as election date, parties started their campaigns. Party campaigns throughout 2020 were heavily impacted by COVID-19, with parties unable to host events during alert levels 3 and 4.

==== National ====
The National Party initially chose Paula Bennett as its campaign manager. (All previous elections since 2005 had seen National with Steven Joyce as campaign manager.) On 2 February 2020, Simon Bridges announced that National would not want to form a coalition with New Zealand First after the election should NZ First become kingmaker once again. Bridges stated: "I can't trust New Zealand First", adding that "A vote for NZ First is a vote for Labour and the Greens". Bridges said that he would, however, be open to working with ACT. NZ First leader Winston Peters criticised Bridges' decision, saying that "narrowing your options can be the worst strategic move you will ever make".

Owing to the four-week lockdown in New Zealand from 23 March during the COVID-19 pandemic, National temporarily suspended their campaign on the same day.

On 22 May 2020, following low poll results for National in the week prior, a National parliamentary caucus meeting replaced Simon Bridges and Paula Bennett with Todd Muller and Nikki Kaye as leader and deputy leader respectively. In his first speech as leader, Muller expressed his openness to working with Winston Peters and New Zealand First after the election. In conjunction with a reshuffle of caucus responsibilities on 25 May, Muller announced that the party had replaced Bennett as campaign manager with Gerry Brownlee. On 14 July 2020 Muller himself resigned as National Party leader, citing mental health issues. An emergency party caucus meeting replaced him later that night with Collins, with Gerry Brownlee becoming the new deputy leader.

After new cases of community transmission in Auckland were reported on 11 August, with the alert level being raised to level 3 in Auckland and level 2 elsewhere, National halted their campaigning for the duration of the lockdown.

On 17 July, National announced they would spend $31 billion on transport projects over the coming decade and would abolish the Auckland regional fuel tax. On 11 September, National announced that they would allow electric vehicles in bus lanes, make one third of the Government's light vehicle fleet electric by 2023, and aim to have 80,000 electric vehicles in use by 2023 (four times more than there currently were). On 15 September, they announced a $30 million policy to improve children's dental care. On 29 September, National announced they would double funding for the Serious Fraud Office to $25 million annually and rename it to the Serious Fraud and Anti-corruption Agency.

==== Labour ====
Megan Woods was chosen as campaign manager. On 29 January 2020, Ardern announced the New Zealand Upgrade Programme, a NZ$12 billion infrastructure improvement package. After new cases of community transmission in Auckland were reported on 11 August, with the alert level being raised to level 3 in Auckland and level 2 elsewhere, Labour halted their campaigning for the duration of the lockdown.

On 7 September, Ardern committed to making Matariki a public holiday from 2022 if Labour was re-elected. On 9 September, Finance spokesperson Grant Robertson announced that Labour would reintroduce the top 39% tax bracket for income above $180,000, applying to 2% of people. He said the new rate would generate around $550 million a year in revenue, needed to pay off the debt incurred by the COVID-19 response plan. On 10 September, Ardern announced Labour would aim to make electricity in New Zealand 100% renewable by 2030, five years before the previous target of 2035. This would be done by banning the building of new coal or gas power plants, boosting the solar sector, and speeding up the consent process for renewable energy projects.

==== NZ First ====
New Zealand First leader Winston Peters named the provincial growth fund in its current form as his first bottom line for any post-election coalition talks. Peters also outlined the party's immigration policy ahead of the election, saying: "The current immigration track must stop and only New Zealand First, with a stronger hand in 2020, can make this happen", and "a vote for New Zealand First will see the permanent residency qualification raised from two to five years". Peters also said the party wanted to lead a public discussion with voters about a "population policy", including defining acceptable population growth and the time for a migrant to obtain permanent residency. At the campaign launch on 19 July 2020, Peters promised a cap of 15,000 highly skilled immigrants and recruiting 1,000 new police officers. After new cases of community transmission in Auckland were reported on 11 August, with the alert level being raised to level 3 in Auckland and level 2 elsewhere, New Zealand First halted their campaigning.

==== Green ====
On 28 June 2020, the Green Party released a Poverty Action Plan, which included a guaranteed minimum income of $325 a week. Green co-leader Marama Davidson stated that "Our Guaranteed Minimum Income is about fairness. It's about ensuring those who have done well under our current system pay it forward and share that success with people who are struggling." This was followed up by the launch of a Clean Energy Plan, to ensure a "just transition away from fossil fuels". The plan included a pledge to establish a Clean Energy Industry Training Plan and to end coal use in New Zealand by 2030. The Green Party launched a 52-page "Think Ahead, Act Now" election platform on 25 July 2020. Green co-leader James Shaw described it as "a reference document that will guide our caucus and our ministers as we navigate the everyday choices that our Government will have to make." After new cases of community transmission in Auckland were reported on 11 August, with the alert level being raised to level 3 in Auckland and level 2 elsewhere, the Green Party halted their campaigning for the duration of the lockdown. On 15 September, Shaw announced that the Green Party would propose a bill that makes it mandatory for large companies to make annual disclosures about the impact of climate change on their businesses and declare strategies for mitigating these impacts.

The Green Party campaigned for the electorate vote in the electorates of Auckland Central and Tāmaki Makaurau.

==== ACT ====
ACT launched their party campaign on 12 July 2020. ACT party leader David Seymour criticised the government's COVID-19 response as "clearly, demonstrably unsustainable", and called for the open pursuing of "having the world's smartest border, not as a rhetorical device, but a practical reality." The party also unveiled a new employment insurance scheme, with 0.55% of income tax being paid to a ring-fenced insurance fund. If someone became unemployed, they would be able to claim 55% of their average weekly earnings over the year up to $60,000. After new cases of community transmission in Auckland were reported on 11 August, with the alert level being raised to level 3 in Auckland and level 2 elsewhere, ACT cancelled its upcoming campaign events.

==== Māori ====
The Māori Party launched their campaign on 20 June 2020 at the Hoani Waititi Marae, with a flagship "Whānau First" policy, ensuring that a quarter of government spending over the next two years is spent on projects led by Māori and involving Māori-led businesses. Māori Party co-leader Debbie Ngarewa-Packer was quoted as saying that "Māori must be guaranteed resources for Māori recovery, we cannot go backwards to how we were living pre-COVID – that is not an option for our whānau, too many of whom are struggling just to survive". Crushed in the last election due to voters in Māori electorates greatly choosing Labour over the Māori Party, co-leader John Tamihere made it clear they would not re-enter a coalition government with National like they did in previous terms of Parliament. On 19 July 2020, the party released a climate change policy, involving an end to new offshore oil and gas permits, as well as withdrawing existing onshore and offshore permits with the goal of ending the oil and gas industry by 2030. The party would also ban new seabed mining permits and withdraw existing permits, as well as establish a $1 billion Pūngao Auaha for "Māori-owned community energy projects and solar panel and insulation instillations". On 14 September, the party announced their major policies, including changing the official name of the country to Aotearoa by 2026, restoring the original Māori names of all towns and cities, requiring primary schools to incorporate Māori language into 25% and later 50% of the curriculum, and requiring all state-funded broadcasters to have a basic fluency level of Māori.

==== New Conservative ====
The New Conservatives ruled out an alliance with both the Labour-led coalition and Billy Te Kahika Jr's New Zealand Public Party. The party received a broadcasting allocation of $62,186 for the 2020 election. The party made headlines during the campaign following repeated vandalism of their advertising in multiple cities, for posting a meme comparing a New Conservative candidate to Nelson Mandela and Abraham Lincoln, and when a candidate repeatedly and falsely claimed to be an ambassador for the Cancer Society charity.

On 6 October 2020, party leader Leighton Baker mounted a legal challenge at the Auckland High Court to protest the party's exclusion from public broadcaster TVNZ's Minor Party debate scheduled for 8 October. To qualify for inclusion in the debate, parties not represented in Parliament must score at least 3 percent in the 1News Colmar-Brunton Poll held during the last six months. The hearing was held on 7 October. The High Court dismissed the New Conservatives' bid, ruling in favour of TVNZ.

On 10 October 2020, it was reported that the New Conservatives' Instagram page had been hacked the previous day with pro-LGBT messages posted on their message feed. In addition, screenshots of the party's logo were shown in rainbow colours. The hack was condemned by party leader Baker and deputy party leader Ikilei, who accused their opponents of intolerance. According to NZME journalist Ethan Griffiths, the hacker had temporarily gained access to the New Conservative Instagram account by posing as Deputy Leader Ikilei on Instagram.

==== Advance NZ ====
Advance NZ launched their campaign on 26 July 2020, merging with the New Zealand Public Party, a party described as "conspiracy theory-driven". The Public Party is to keep their identity and structure, but with the exception of Billy Te Kahika in Te Tai Tokerau, who is running on the Public Party name, all candidates will run as Advance NZ candidates. Jami-Lee Ross, MP for Botany and Te Kahika are to become co-leaders of Advance NZ. Ross stated in regards to the merger that "By forming an alliance of parties, together with other small parties that believe in greater freedom and democracy, we stand a stronger chance of uniting together and crossing the 5 percent threshold in to Parliament," and branded Advance NZ "the new Alliance Party of the 2020s, but a centrist version of that model". At the launch, Te Kahika promised an immediate repeal of the COVID-19 Public Health Response Act 2020. Ross also reportedly told the NZ Herald that the party was in talks with six smaller parties about joining Advance NZ. On 6 August 2020, the party was registered with the Electoral Commission.

=== Debates ===
Television New Zealand (TVNZ) hosted three television leaders' debates: two between the National and Labour leaders, and one multi-party debate. The first National–Labour debate was moderated by John Campbell, with the multi party debate and second National–Labour debate hosted by Jessica Mutch McKay. A young voters debate was hosted by Jack Tame. Newshub Nation hosted a "power brokers" debate, which included the Māori Party, with the inclusion threshold being having held a seat in Parliament over the past 2 parliamentary terms. This was confirmed on 27 August 2020, when Newshub announced a leaders' debate on 30 September between National and Labour, and a "powerbrokers" debate which included the Greens, ACT and the Māori Party.

==== TVNZ qualification criteria ====
The inclusion criteria set by TVNZ for its multi-party debate was either having current representation in Parliament or winning 3% in a poll, which sparked controversy as those criteria excluded minor parties such as the Māori Party, The Opportunities Party and the New Conservative Party from the debate. Māori Party co-leader John Tamihere said TVNZ had a responsibility to "reflect Māori perspectives, as laid out in ministerial direction". Race Relations Commissioner Meng Foon endorsed the Māori Party position. The requirements were modified on 8 September 2020, when TVNZ broadened their criteria to use previous parliamentary representation as a marker, including the Māori Party. The parliamentary criterion was expanded to include "leaders of registered parties where the leader has been an MP, or party has been represented, in either/both of the past two parliaments."

Qualifying parties for the TVNZ multi-party debate
| Party | Met polling criterion (≥3% in any Colmar Brunton poll) | Met parliamentary criterion (Having seats in either of the last two Parliaments) | Attending debate |
| Labour | Yes (48% in September 2020 poll) | Yes | No |
| National | Yes (35% in September 2020 poll) | Yes | No |
| ACT | Yes (8% in September 2020 poll) | Yes | Yes |
| Green | Yes (6% in September 2020 poll) | Yes | Yes |
| NZ First | Yes (3.3% in February 2020 poll) | Yes | Yes |
| Māori Party | No (0.9% in September 2020 poll) | Yes | Yes |
| Advance NZ | No (0.8% in September 2020 poll) | Yes | Yes |
| New Conservative | No (1.6% in September 2020 poll) | No | No |
| Opportunities | No (1.1% in September 2020 poll) | No | No |
| Legalise Cannabis | No (0.2% in September 2020 poll) | No | No |
| Outdoors | No (0.2% in September 2020 poll) | No | No |
| Sustainable NZ | No (0.1% in September 2020 poll) | No | No |
| ONE | No (0.2% in July 2020 poll) | No | No |
| Social Credit | No (0.1% in June 2020 poll) | No | No |
| Vision NZ | No (0.1% in May 2020 poll) | No | No |
| Heartland | No | No | No |
| TEA | No | No | No |

==== Table of major debates ====
| Date | Time (NZT) | Organiser(s) | Subject | Participants | | | | | | | | |
| Date | Time (NZT) | Organiser(s) | Subject | National | Labour | NZ First | Green | ACT | Advance NZ | Māori | TOP | Vision NZ |
|---|---|---|---|---|---|---|---|---|---|---|---|---|
| 6 August | 17:30–19:30 | CID | Foreign affairs | Present; Bridges | Present; Parker | Present; Tabuteau | Present; Shaw | Present; Seymour | Not invited | Not invited | Not invited | Not invited |
| 18 September | 11:45–13:15 | WasteMINZ | Waste and environment | Present; Simpson | Present; Parker | Absent | Present; Sage | Present; Court | Not invited | Absent | Present; Christie | Not invited |
| 22 September | 19:00–20:30 | TVNZ | Leaders' debate | Present; Collins | Present; Ardern | Not invited | Not invited | Not invited | Not invited | Not invited | Not invited | Not invited |
| 22 September | 19:00–20:30 | ASB/Newshub | Finance | Present; Goldsmith | Present; Robertson | Present; Tabuteau | Present; Shaw | Present; Seymour | Not invited | Not invited | Not invited | Not invited |
| 24 September | 18:00–21:00 | Te Taumata Toi-a-Iwi | Arts and culture | Present; Young | Present; Sepuloni | Absent | Present; Swarbrick | Absent | Not invited | Not invited | Not invited | Not invited |
| 28 September | | TVNZ/University of Auckland | Young voters | Present; Brown | Present; Allan | Present; Griffith | Present; Swarbrick | Present van Velden | Not invited | Not invited | Not invited | Not invited |
| 30 September | From 19:30 | Newshub | Leaders' debate | Present; Collins | Present; Ardern | Not invited | Not invited | Not invited | Not invited | Not invited | Not invited | Not invited |
| 3 October (filmed 1 October) | From 09:30 | Newshub Nation | Minor parties | Not invited | Not invited | Present; Peters | Present; Davidson | Present; Seymour | Not invited | Present; Tamihere | Not invited | Not invited |
| 6 October | From 19:00 | Māori Television | Multi-party debate in the Māori language | Absent | Present; Henare | Present; Jones | Present; Tuiono | Absent | Not invited | Present; Waititi | Not invited | Present; Wilcox |
| 6 October | From 19:00 | Stuff | Leaders' debate | Present; Collins | Present; Ardern | Not invited | Not invited | Not invited | Not invited | Not invited | Not invited | Not invited |
| 8 October | From 19:00 | TVNZ | Multi-party debate | Absent | Absent | Present; Peters | Present; Shaw | Present; Seymour | Present; Ross | Present; Tamihere | Not invited | Not invited |
| 15 October | From 19:00 | TVNZ | Leaders' debate | Present; Collins | Present; Ardern | Not invited | Not invited | Not invited | Not invited | Not invited | Not invited | Not invited |

== Opinion polls ==
Various organisations commissioned opinion polling for the general election. Two main polling organisations regularly sampled the electorates' opinions: Reid Research (on behalf of MediaWorks New Zealand) and Colmar Brunton (on behalf of TVNZ). Roy Morgan Research released a series of polls in June 2020, covering the first five months of the year, and subsequently released monthly polls. These were their first opinion polls in New Zealand since November 2017.

Graphical summary of polls conducted for the 2020 New Zealand general election. Results as of the end of 17 October (election day) are indicated with diamonds.

=== Seat projections ===
The use of mixed-member proportional representation allows ready conversion of a party's support into a party vote percentage and therefore a number of seats in Parliament. Projections assume the new electorate of Takanini will be won by either Labour or National and that Botany will be returned to National. Projections that show the National Party winning fewer than 41 total seats (41 being the number of electorate seats held by National during the 52nd Parliament) assume that National will lose at least enough electorates to avoid an overhang. Parties that do not hold an electorate seat and poll below 5% are assumed to win zero seats. Otherwise, projections assume no material change to the electorate seats held by each party. Parties that do not hold an electorate seat and poll below 5% are assumed to win zero seats.

When determining the scenarios for the overall result, the minimum parties necessary to form majority governments are listed (provided parties have indicated openness to working together). Actual governments formed may include other parties beyond the minimum required for a majority; this happened after the 2014 election, when National only needed one seat from another party to reach a 61-seat majority, but instead chose to form a 64-seat government with Māori, ACT and United Future.

| Source | Seats in Parliament (Note: Forecasted seats are calculated using the Electoral Commission's MMP seat allocation calculator, based on polling results.) | | | | | | | Likely government formation(s) |
| Source | NAT | LAB | NZF | GRN | ACT | MRI | Total | Likely government formation(s) |
|---|---|---|---|---|---|---|---|---|
| Roy Morgan Sep 2020 poll | 38 | 61 | 0 | 12 | 9 | 0 | 120 | Labour (61) |
| 1 News–Colmar Brunton 10–14 Oct 2020 poll | 40 | 59 | 0 | 11 | 10 | 0 | 120 | Labour–Green (70) |
| Newshub–Reid Research 8–15 Oct 2020 poll | 41 | 61 | 0 | 8 | 10 | 0 | 120 | Labour (61) |
| 2020 result | 33 | 65 | 0 | 10 | 10 | 2 | 120 | Labour (65) |

== Voting ==
EasyVote packs were sent to voters starting on 28 September 2020. These packs contain the voter's personalised EasyVote card, which is used by polling booth staff to help identify and locate the voter on the electoral roll. It also included flyers on the voting process and two referendums. On 5 October 2020, The Spinoff reported that four EasyVote packs in Northland allegedly contained a flyer from Votesafe, a third-party promoter opposing the End of Life Choice Act. Votesafe confirmed its flyers were printed at the same facility as the Electoral Commission's flyers, and both Votesafe and the Electoral Commission were investigating.

Advance voting began on 3 October at 450 polling locations, increasing to 2,600 locations on election day, 17 October. The Electoral Commission estimated that 60% of votes would occur during the advance voting period, up from 47% in 2017. On 12 October, the number of advance votes cast passed the 1,240,740 advance votes cast overall at the 2017 election. Overall, 1,976,996 advance votes were cast, 66.7% of all votes cast. The polling booth at North City Shopping Centre in Porirua was the busiest advance polling booth with 13,371 votes cast, while the polling booth at the Selwyn District Council headquarters in Rolleston was the busiest election-day polling booth with 1,601 votes cast.

Voters on the Māori roll faced issues with receiving Māori electorate ballots due to high demand during advance voting, leading to some people having to cast special votes instead.

On 5 October, an error was discovered on Port Waikato electorate ballot papers, where there was no circle to tick next to Vision NZ on the party vote ballot. The Electoral Commission subsequently reprinted the ballot papers. Provided the voter's intention is clear, a tick or other mark placed outside the circle will still be counted as a valid vote.

The Electoral Commission referred two people to Police after they claimed to have voted multiple times, one on 5 October and another on 14 October.

In September 2023, the Electoral Commission released a report which found that 16% of Asian New Zealanders had a "poor" or "very poor" understanding of the New Zealand voting process during the 2020 election, compared to 9% of non-Asians. The report also found that Asians were less confident that the New Zealand elections would be free from influence but were more likely to be motivated to "make a change" when voting. Asian New Zealanders were also less engaged with the EasyVote information package, television advertisements and informational pamphlets but were more likely to notice election advertising on signs and bus shelters. Asian voters were less familiar with voting instructions, candidates, and parties on ballot papers. Despite these negative findings, the report also found that Asian satisfaction with the voting process had improved since the 2017 election.

== Results ==
Results of the 2020 general election. From left to right: general electorate winners, Māori electorate winners, and numbers of List MPs.

Map of party votes in each electorate. Labour won the most party votes in 71 of the 72 electorates, losing only Epsom.

Preliminary results were gradually released after polling booths close at 19:00 (NZDT) on 17 October. The preliminary count only includes advance ordinary and election day ordinary votes; it does not include any special votes, which have a deadline ten days later (27 October). Special votes include votes from those who enrolled after the deadline of 13 September, those who voted outside their electorate (including all overseas votes), voters in hospital or prison, and those voters enrolled on the unpublished roll. Official results, including all recounted ordinary votes and special votes, were released by the Electoral Commission on 6 November 2020.

On the official results, the Labour Party won 65 seats, a majority of four–the party's biggest victory in 50 years. The Labour Party's 50.0% vote share in this election is the third highest throughout its 104-year history, only surpassed by its election victories in 1938 (55.8%) and 1946 (51.3%). It is the first time under the current mixed-member proportional representation (MMP) electoral system that a party has won a majority of parliamentary seats. The National Party obtained 25.6% of the popular vote and 33 seats in Parliament, which represented its worst result since 2002 (where it obtained 20.9% of the popular vote), its second worst historical result, and in terms of the difference between National's and Labour's vote share the worst election outcome since the party's founding in 1936. National's leader Collins conceded the election just after 10pm on election night, but said in her concession speech that "[National] will be back".

The results of the "COVID-19 election" led to the flipping of many traditionally "blue" National-voting provincial seats, with often more than comfortable margins. Examples were Wairarapa, East Coast, Ōtaki, and Rangitata, the latter having never previously voted for Labour. In another devastating blow to National's heartlands, every city except Auckland (including the Hibiscus Coast), Tauranga, Rotorua and Invercargill gave their seats entirely to Labour. (Note: Some outer suburbs of Palmerston North and Christchurch fall into surrounding rural electorates that were won by National.) Victims of National seat losses were National deputy leader Gerry Brownlee, who had held Ilam for its entire existence; Chris Bishop, considered a rising star, who unexpectedly flipped Hutt South for National in 2017; and Father of the House Nick Smith, member for Nelson since 1990. Three electorates flipped to Labour following the inclusion of special votes: Northland, Whangārei and Maungakiekie. Labour also flipped Hamilton West, the country's bellwether; in 15 of the 17 general elections since the electorate's formation in 1969, the candidate winning the electorate vote in Hamilton West has been from the party that would form the government, the two exceptions being 1993 and 2017.

In a surprise victory, list MP Chlöe Swarbrick won the Auckland Central electoral seat vacated by National's retiring Nikki Kaye, with a margin of 1,068 votes over Labour's Helen White, thus winning for the Green Party an electorate seat for the first time since 1999. Swarbrick's victory was notable as she garnered 3,923 more votes within the same electorate than her own Green Party, a prime example of voters being engaged in split-ticket voting; however, it was highly unusual as numerous voters who supported a major party also voted for an electorate MP from a minor party. The Māori Party also returned to Parliament due to the election of Rawiri Waititi in the seat of Waiariki, a seat which the party had lost three years prior. This makes Tāmati Coffey the only Labour electorate MP to lose their electorate, however due to his list placing, Coffey returned to parliament through the list.

The 2020 general election saw the election of New Zealand's first African MP (Ibrahim Omer), first Sri Lankan-born MP (Vanushi Walters) and first Latin American MP (Ricardo Menéndez March). Six new LGBT+ MPs were elected (Menéndez March, Glen Bennett, Ayesha Verrall, Shanan Halbert, Elizabeth Kerekere, Tangi Utikere), making the New Zealand House of Representatives the national parliament with the highest percentage of LGBT+ members in the world.

Parties and candidates have three working days after the release of the official results to apply for a judicial recount. These recounts take place under the auspices of a District Court judge (the Chief District Court Judge in case of a nationwide recount). National MP Matt King announced he would seek a recount in the Northland electorate, after he lost the electorate to Labour's Willow-Jean Prime by 163 votes, but later changed his mind and conceded.

=== Detailed results ===
Summary of the 17 October 2020 election for the House of Representatives
| Party | Party vote | | | | Electorate vote sum | | | | Total seats | +/- |
| Party | Votes | % | Change (pp) | Seats | Votes | % | Change (pp) | Seats | Total seats | +/- |
|---|---|---|---|---|---|---|---|---|---|---|
| Labour | 1,443,545 | 50.01 | ▲13.12 | 19 | 1,357,501 | 48.07 | ▲10.19 | 46 | 65 | ▲19 |
| National | 738,275 | 25.58 | ▼18.87 | 10 | 963,845 | 34.13 | ▼9.92 | 23 | 33 | ▼23 |
| Green | 226,757 | 7.86 | ▲1.59 | 9 | 162,245 | 5.74 | ▼1.17 | 1 | 10 | ▲2 |
| ACT | 219,031 | 7.59 | ▲7.08 | 9 | 97,697 | 3.46 | ▲2.45 | 1 | 10 | ▲9 |
| NZ First | 75,020 | 2.60 | ▼4.60 | 0 | 30,209 | 1.07 | ▼4.38 | 0 | 0 | ▼9 |
| Opportunities (TOP) | 43,449 | 1.51 | ▼0.94 | 0 | 25,181 | 0.89 | ▼0.14 | 0 | 0 | Steady |
| New Conservative | 42,613 | 1.48 | ▲1.24 | 0 | 49,598 | 1.76 | ▲1.52 | 0 | 0 | Steady |
| Māori Party | 33,630 | 1.17 | ▼0.01 | 1 | 60,837 | 2.15 | ▲0.04 | 1 | 2 | ▲2 |
| Advance NZ | 28,429 | 0.98 | new | 0 | 25,054 | 0.89 | new | 0 | 0 | new |
| Legalise Cannabis | 13,329 | 0.46 | ▲0.15 | 0 | 8,044 | 0.28 | ▲0.12 | 0 | 0 | Steady |
| ONE | 8,121 | 0.28 | new | 0 | 6,830 | 0.24 | new | 0 | 0 | new |
| Vision NZ | 4,237 | 0.15 | new | 0 | 2,139 | 0.08 | new | 0 | 0 | new |
| Outdoors | 3,256 | 0.11 | ▲0.05 | 0 | 7,982 | 0.28 | ▲0.23 | 0 | 0 | Steady |
| TEA | 2,414 | 0.08 | new | 0 | 2,764 | 0.10 | new | 0 | 0 | new |
| Sustainable NZ | 1,880 | 0.07 | new | 0 | 2,421 | 0.09 | new | 0 | 0 | new |
| Social Credit | 1,520 | 0.05 | ▲0.02 | 0 | 2,699 | 0.11 | ▼0.09 | 0 | 0 | Steady |
| Heartland | 914 | 0.03 | new | 0 | 8,462 | 0.30 | new | 0 | 0 | new |
| Unregistered parties | — | — | — | — | 3,391 | 0.12 | ▲0.08 | 0 | 0 | Steady |
| Independent | — | — | — | — | 7,299 | 0.26 | ▼0.24 | 0 | 0 | Steady |
| Valid votes | 2,886,420 | 98.88 | ▲0.34 | | 2,824,198 | 96.75 | ▲0.58 | | | |
| Informal votes | 21,372 | 0.73 | ▲0.32 | | 57,138 | 1.96 | ▲0.80 | | | |
| Disallowed votes | 11,281 | 0.39 | ▼0.66 | | 37,737 | 2.66 | ▼1.37 | | | |
| Below electoral threshold | 225,182 | 7.71 | | | — | — | — | | | |
| Total | 2,919,073 | 100 | | 48 | 2,919,073 | 100 | | 72 | 120 | |
| Eligible voters and turnout | 3,549,580 | 82.24 | ▲2.49 | | 3,549,580 | 82.24 | ▲2.49 | | | |

Electorate vote
| Labour | 48.07% |
| National | 34.13% |
| Green | 5.74% |
| ACT | 3.46% |
| Māori | 2.15% |
| New Conservative | 1.76% |
| NZ First | 1.07% |
| Others | 3.62% |

Party vote
| Labour | 50.01% |
| National | 25.58% |
| Green | 7.86% |
| ACT | 7.59% |
| NZ First | 2.60% |
| Opportunities | 1.51% |
| New Conservative | 1.48% |
| Māori | 1.17% |
| Others | 2.22% |

Parliament seats
| Labour | 54.17% |
| National | 27.50% |
| Green | 8.33% |
| ACT | 8.33% |
| Māori | 1.67% |

=== Electorate results ===
Party affiliation of winning electorate candidates.

The table below shows the results of the 2020 general election:

Key

National
Labour
ACT
Green
NZ First
New Conservative
Opportunities
Māori Party
Heartland
Advance NZ
Legalise Cannabis
Vision NZ
Independent

Electorate results of the 2020 New Zealand general election
| Electorate | Incumbent | Winner | Majority | Runner up | Third place |
|---|---|---|---|---|---|
| Auckland Central | Nikki Kaye | Chlöe Swarbrick | 1,068 | Helen White | Emma Mellow |
| Banks Peninsula | New electorate | Tracey McLellan | 13,156 | Catherine Chu | Eugenie Sage |
| Bay of Plenty | Todd Muller | | 3,415 | Angie Warren-Clark | Bruce Carley |
| Botany | Jami-Lee Ross | Christopher Luxon | 3,999 | Naisi Chen | Damien Smith |
| Christchurch Central | Duncan Webb | | 14,098 | Dale Stephens | Chrys Horn |
| Christchurch East | Poto Williams | | 17,336 | Lincoln Platt | Nikki Berry |
| Coromandel | Scott Simpson | | 3,505 | Nathaniel Blomfield | Pamela Grealey |
| Dunedin | New electorate | David Clark | 15,521 | Michael Woodhouse | Jack Brazil |
| East Coast | Anne Tolley | Kiri Allan | 6,331 | Tania Tapsell | Meredith Akuhata-Brown |
| East Coast Bays | Erica Stanford | | 8,764 | Monina Hernandez | Dan Jones |
| Epsom | David Seymour | | 9,224 | Camilla Belich | Paul Goldsmith |
| Hamilton East | David Bennett | Jamie Strange | 2,973 | David Bennett | Rimu Bhooi |
| Hamilton West | Tim Macindoe | Gaurav Sharma | 6,267 | Tim Macindoe | Roger Weldon |
| Hutt South | Chris Bishop | Ginny Andersen | 3,777 | Chris Bishop | Richard McIntosh |
| Ilam | Gerry Brownlee | Sarah Pallett | 3,463 | Gerry Brownlee | David Bennett |
| Invercargill | Sarah Dowie | Penny Simmonds | 224 | Liz Craig | Rochelle Francis |
| Kaikōura | Stuart Smith | | 2,295 | Matt Flight | Richard McCubbin |
| Kaipara ki Mahurangi | New electorate | Chris Penk | 4,435 | Marja Lubeck | Beth Houlbrooke |
| Kelston | Carmel Sepuloni | | 15,660 | Bala Beeram | Jessamine Fraser |
| Mana | Kris Faafoi | Barbara Edmonds | 16,224 | Jo Hayes | Jan Logie |
| Māngere | William Sio | | 19,396 | Agnes Loheni | Peter Brian Sykes |
| Manurewa | Louisa Wall | Arena Williams | 17,179 | Nuwi Samarakone | John Hall |
| Maungakiekie | Denise Lee | Priyanca Radhakrishnan | 635 | Denise Lee | Ricardo Menéndez March |
| Mount Albert | Jacinda Ardern | | 21,246 | Melissa Lee | Luke Wijohn |
| Mount Roskill | Michael Wood | | 13,853 | Parmjeet Parmar | Golriz Ghahraman |
| Napier | Stuart Nash | | 5,856 | Katie Nimon | James Crow |
| Nelson | Nick Smith | Rachel Boyack | 4,525 | Nick Smith | Aaron Stallard |
| New Lynn | Deborah Russell | | 13,134 | Lisa Whyte | Steve Abel |
| New Plymouth | Jonathan Young | Glen Bennett | 2,555 | Jonathan Young | Murray Chong |
| North Shore | Maggie Barry | Simon Watts | 3,734 | Romy Udanga | Liz Rawlings |
| Northcote | Dan Bidois | Shanan Halbert | 2,534 | Dan Bidois | Natasha Fairley |
| Northland | Matt King | Willow-Jean Prime | 163 | Matt King | Shane Jones |
| Ōhāriu | Greg O'Connor | | 11,961 | Brett Hudson | Jessica Hammond |
| Ōtaki | Nathan Guy | Terisa Ngobi | 2,988 | Tim Costley | Bernard Long |
| Pakuranga | Simeon Brown | | 10,050 | Nerissa Henry | Lawrence Xu-Nan |
| Palmerston North | Iain Lees-Galloway | Tangi Utikere | 12,508 | William Wood | Teanau Tuiono |
| Panmure-Ōtāhuhu | New electorate | Jenny Salesa | 18,626 | Kanwaljit Singh Bakshi | Mark Simiona |
| Papakura | Judith Collins | | 5,583 | Anahila Kanongata'a-Suisuiki | Sue Cowie |
| Port Waikato | New electorate | Andrew Bayly | 4,313 | Baljit Kaur | Mark Ball |
| Rangitata | Vacant (Note: Was Andrew Falloon until his immediate resignation on 21 July 2020.) | Jo Luxton | 4,408 | Megan Hands | Hamish Hutton |
| Rangitīkei | Ian McKelvie | | 2,961 | Soraya Peke-Mason | Ali Hale Tilley |
| Remutaka | Chris Hipkins | | 20,497 | Mark Crofskey | Chris Norton |
| Rongotai | Paul Eagle | | 19,207 | Teall Crossen | David Patterson |
| Rotorua | Todd McClay | | 825 | Claire Mahon | Kaya Sparke |
| Selwyn | Amy Adams | Nicola Grigg | 4,968 | Reuben Davidson | Stuart Armstrong |
| Southland | New electorate | Joseph Mooney | 5,645 | Jon Mitchell | David Kennedy |
| Taieri | New electorate | Ingrid Leary | 12,398 | Liam Kernaghan | Scott Willis |
| Takanini | New electorate | Neru Leavasa | 7,724 | Rima Nakhle | Mike McCormick |
| Tāmaki | Simon O'Connor | | 8,068 | Shirin Brown | Sylvia Boys |
| Taranaki-King Country | Barbara Kuriger | | 3,134 | Angela Roberts | Brent Miles |
| Taupō | Louise Upston | | 5,119 | Ala' Al-Bustanji | Danna Glendining |
| Tauranga | Simon Bridges | | 1,856 | Jan Tinetti | Josh Cole |
| Te Atatū | Phil Twyford | | 10,508 | Alfred Ngaro | Scott Hindman |
| Tukituki | Lawrence Yule | Anna Lorck | 1,590 | Lawrence Yule | Chris Perley |
| Upper Harbour | Paula Bennett | Vanushi Walters | 2,392 | Jake Bezzant | Ryan Nicholls |
| Waikato | Tim van de Molen | | 5,216 | Kerrin Leoni | James McDowall |
| Waimakariri | Matt Doocey | | 1,507 | Dan Rosewarne | Leighton Baker |
| Wairarapa | Alastair Scott | Kieran McAnulty | 6,545 | Mike Butterick | Ron Mark |
| Waitaki | Jacqui Dean | | 3,281 | Liam Wairepo | Sampsa Kiuru |
| Wellington Central | Grant Robertson | | 18,878 | Nicola Willis | James Shaw |
| West Coast-Tasman | Damien O'Connor | | 6,208 | Maureen Pugh | Steve Richards |
| Whanganui | Harete Hipango | Steph Lewis | 8,191 | Harete Hipango | Alan Clay |
| Whangaparāoa | New electorate | Mark Mitchell | 7,823 | Lorayne Ferguson | Paul Grace |
| Whangārei | Shane Reti | Emily Henderson | 431 | Shane Reti | David Seymour (Note: The David Seymour who contested the electorate of Whangārei for ACT is a different person from ACT party leader, David Seymour, who re-contested and won his Auckland seat of Epsom.) |
| Wigram | Megan Woods | | 14,770 | Hamish Campbell | Richard Wesley |
Māori electorates
| Hauraki-Waikato | Nanaia Mahuta | | 9,660 | Donna Pokere-Phillips | Philip Lambert |
| Ikaroa-Rāwhiti | Meka Whaitiri | | 6,045 | Heather Te Au-Skipworth | Elizabeth Kerekere |
| Tāmaki Makaurau | Peeni Henare | | 927 | John Tamihere | Marama Davidson |
| Te Tai Hauāuru | Adrian Rurawhe | | 1,053 | Debbie Ngarewa-Packer | Noeline Apiata |
| Te Tai Tokerau | Kelvin Davis | | 8,164 | Mariameno Kapa-Kingi | Maki Herbert |
| Te Tai Tonga | Rino Tirikatene | | 6,855 | Tākuta Ferris | Ariana Paretutanganui-Tamati |
| Waiariki | Tāmati Coffey | Rawiri Waititi | 836 | Tāmati Coffey | Hannah Tamaki |

In above table, majority denotes the winning candidate's lead over the second place candidate.

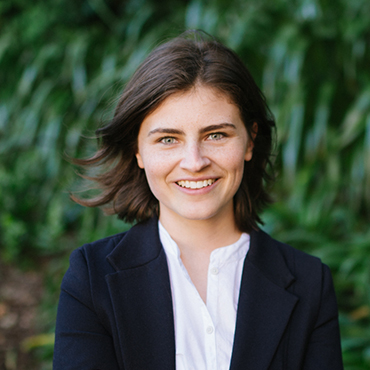
Chlöe Swarbrick (Auckland Central)

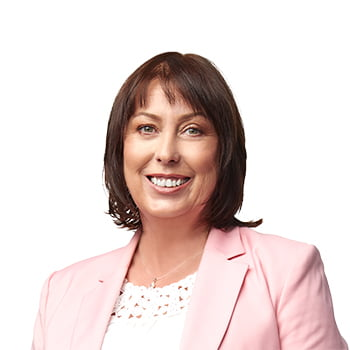
Tracey McLellan (Banks Peninsula)

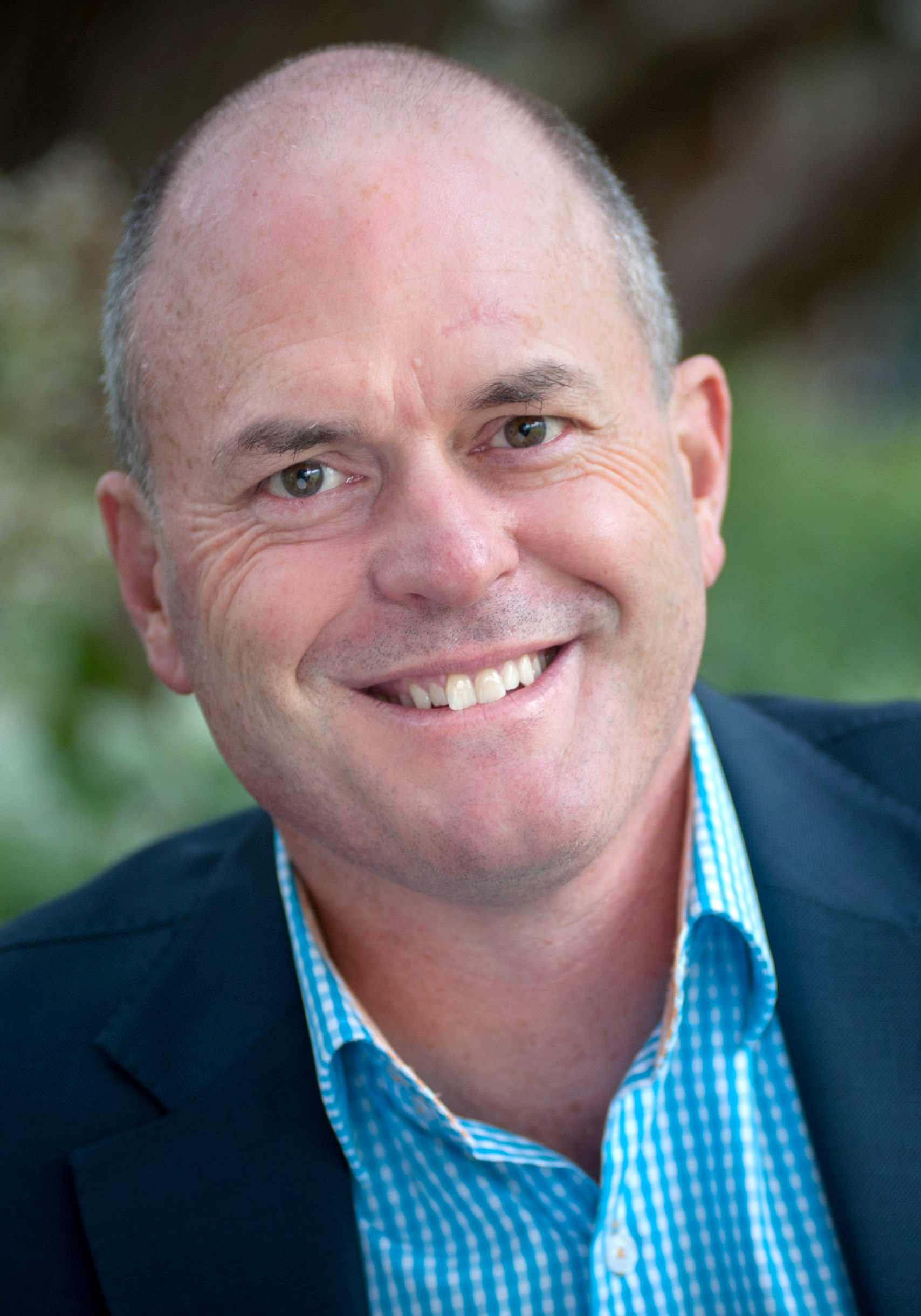
Todd Muller (Bay of Plenty)

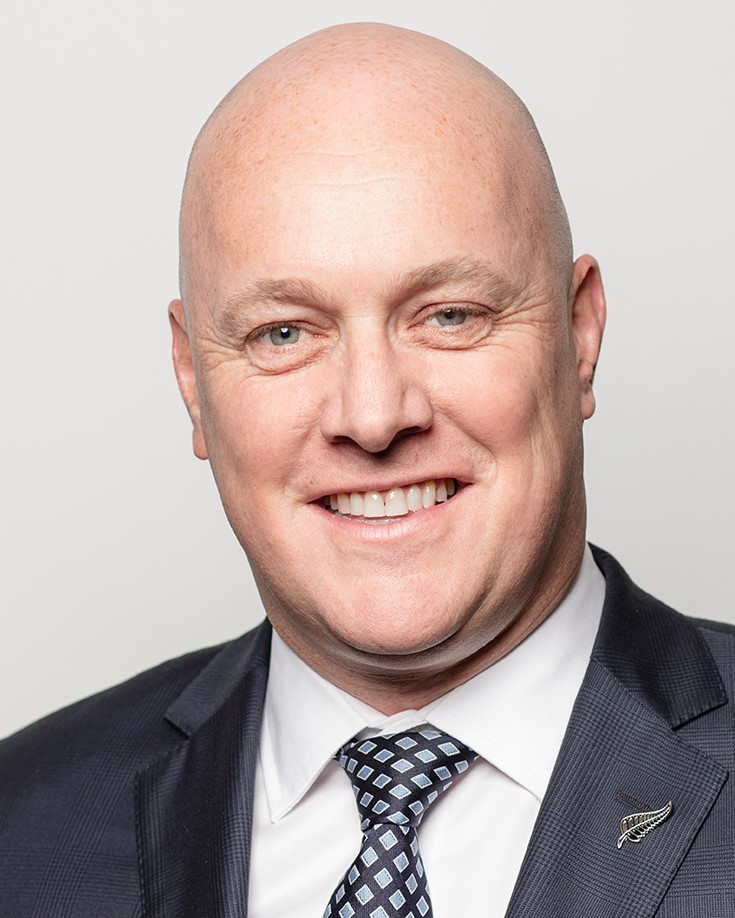
Christopher Luxon (Botany)

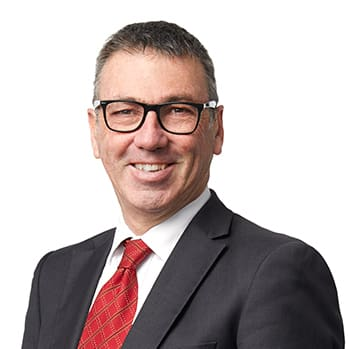
Duncan Webb (Christchurch Central)

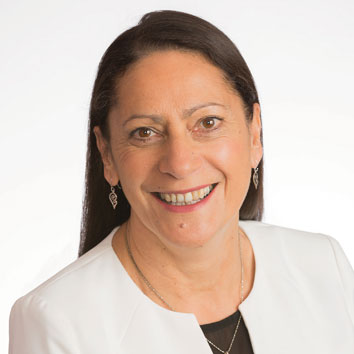
Poto Williams (Christchurch East)

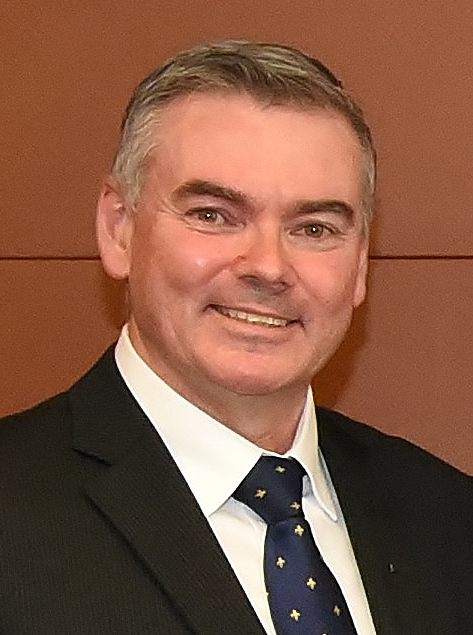
Scott Simpson (Coromandel)

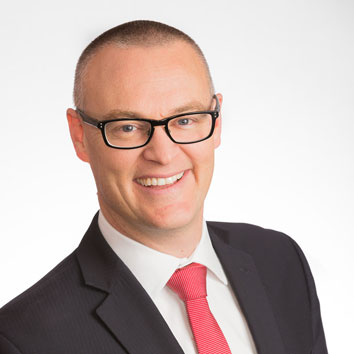
David Clark (Dunedin)

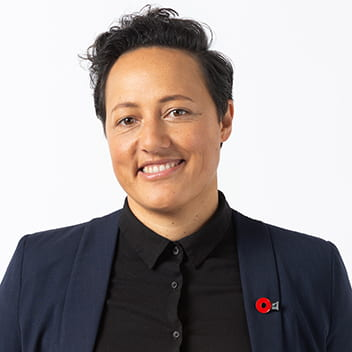
Kiri Allan (East Coast)

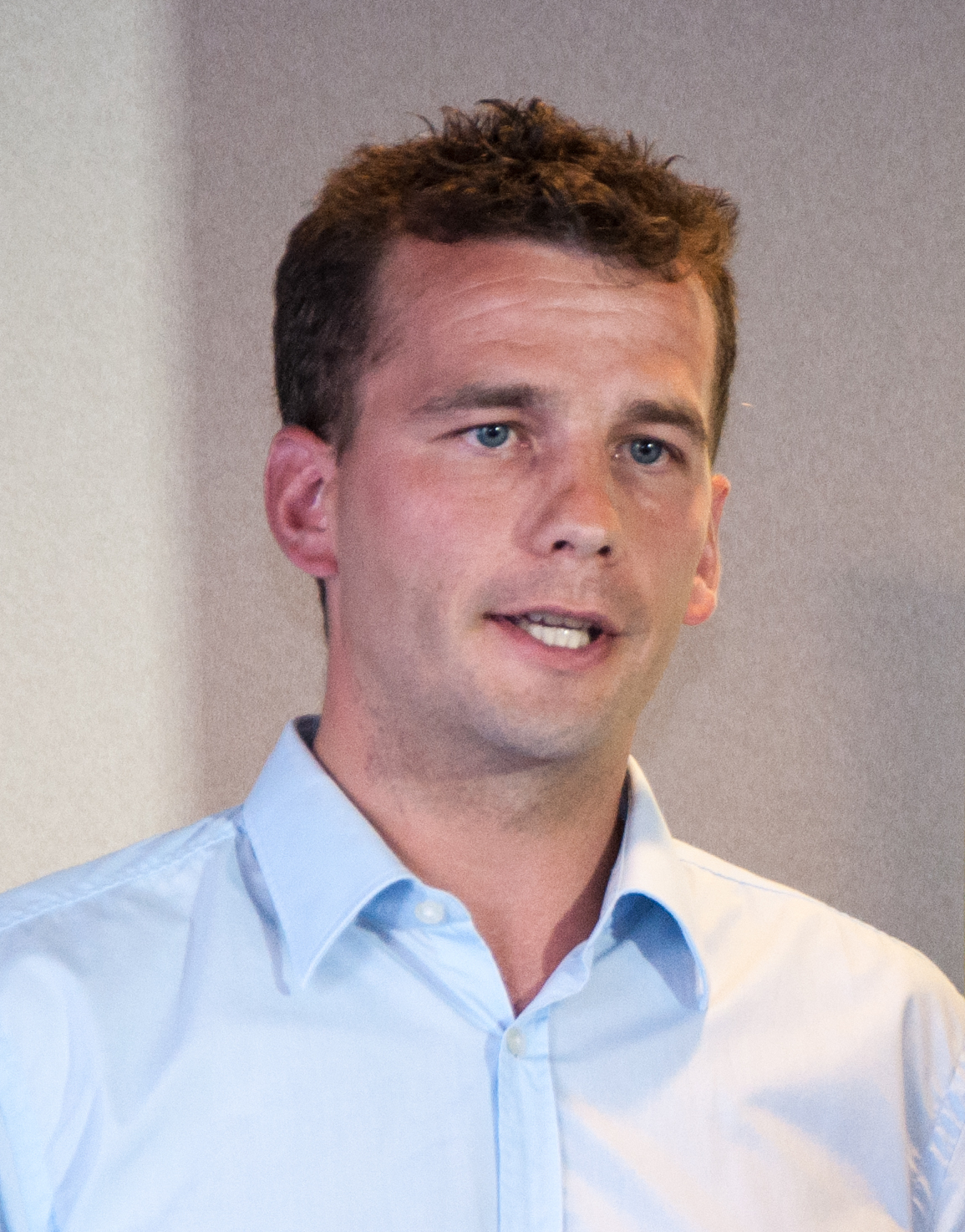
David Seymour (Epsom)

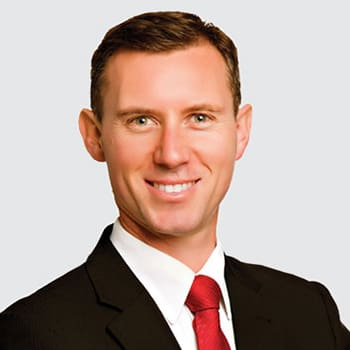
Jamie Strange (Hamilton East)

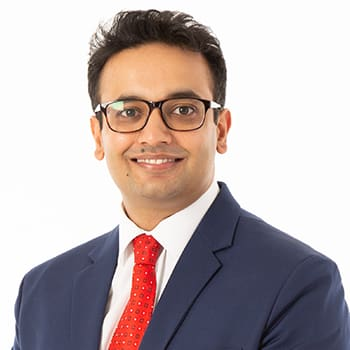
Gaurav Sharma (Hamilton West)

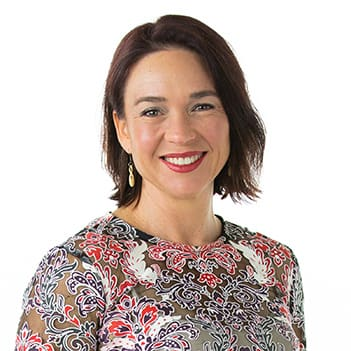
Ginny Andersen (Hutt South)

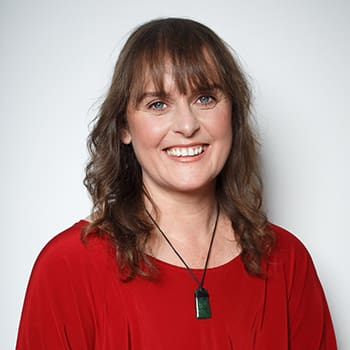
Sarah Pallett (Ilam)

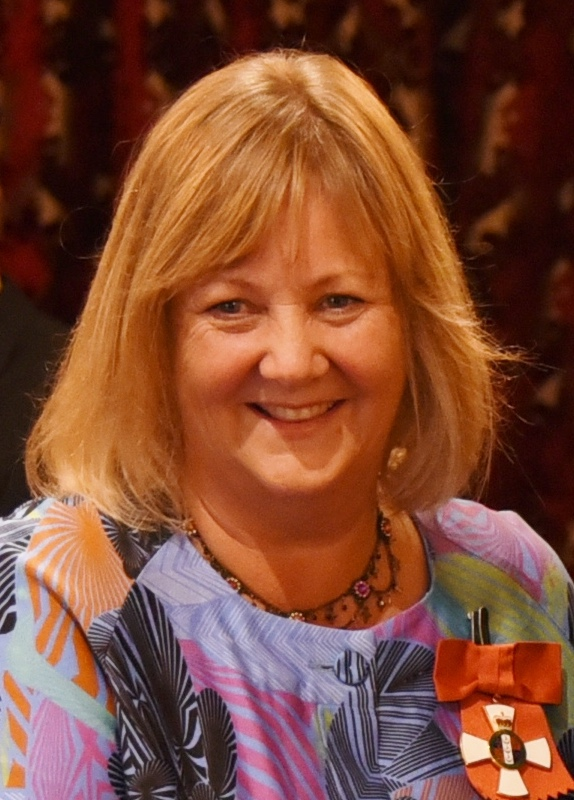
Penny Simmonds (Invercargill)

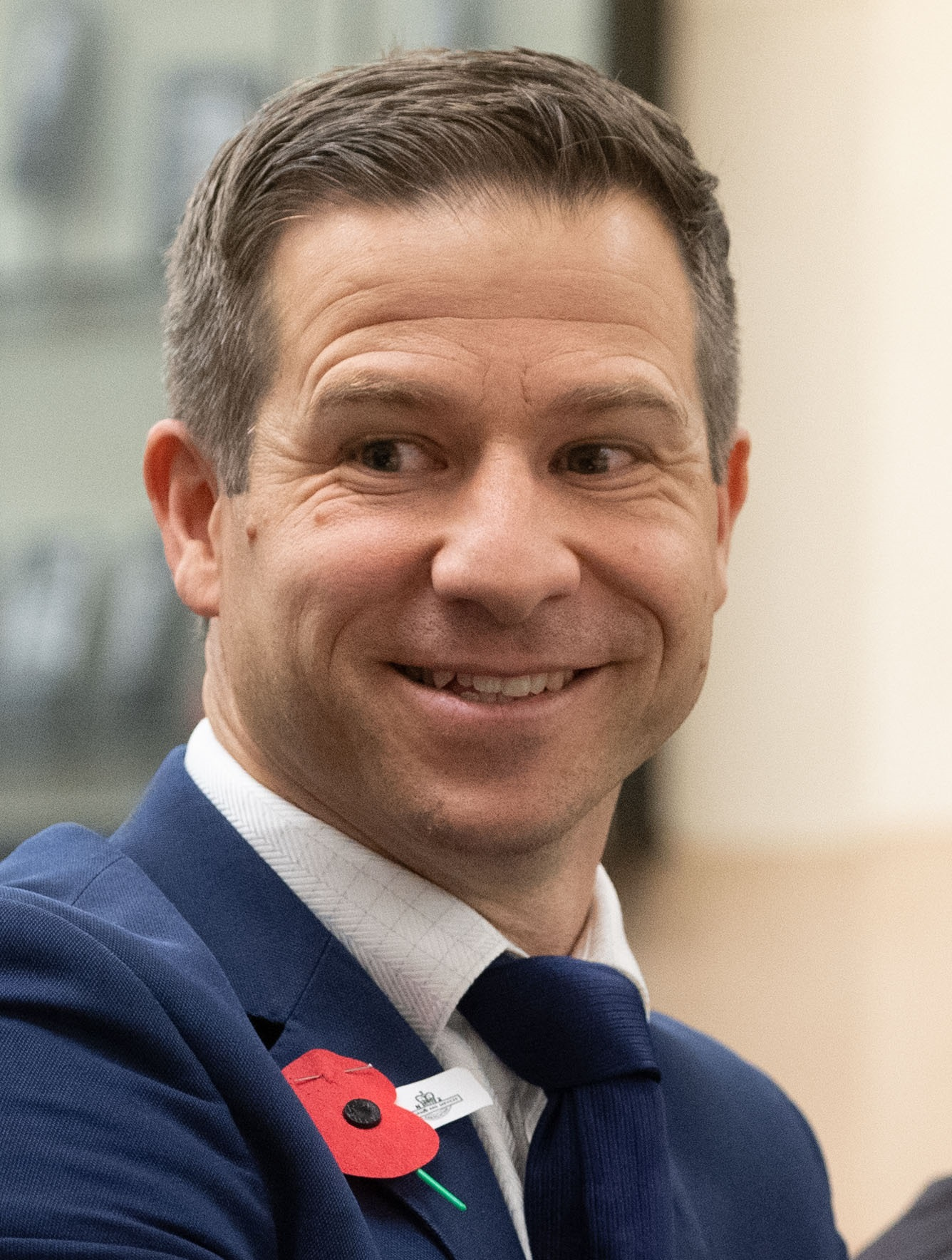
Chris Penk (Kaipara ki Mahurangi)

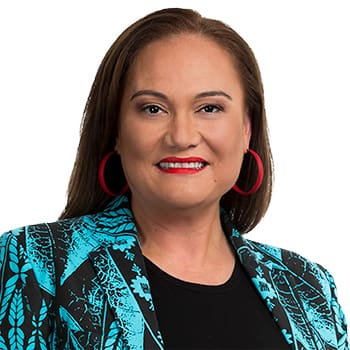
Carmel Sepuloni (Kelston)

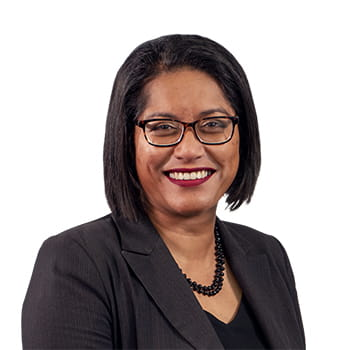
Barbara Edmonds (Mana)

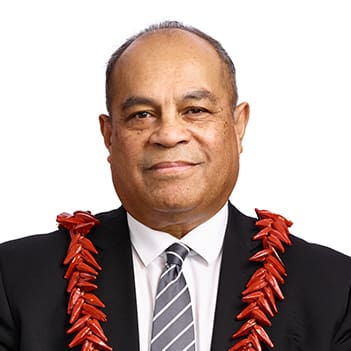
William Sio (Māngere)

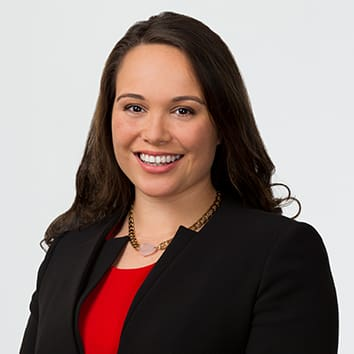
Arena Williams (Manurewa)

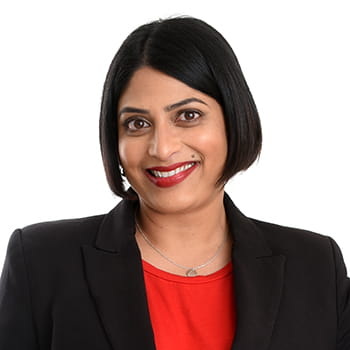
Priyanca Radhakrishnan (Maungakiekie)

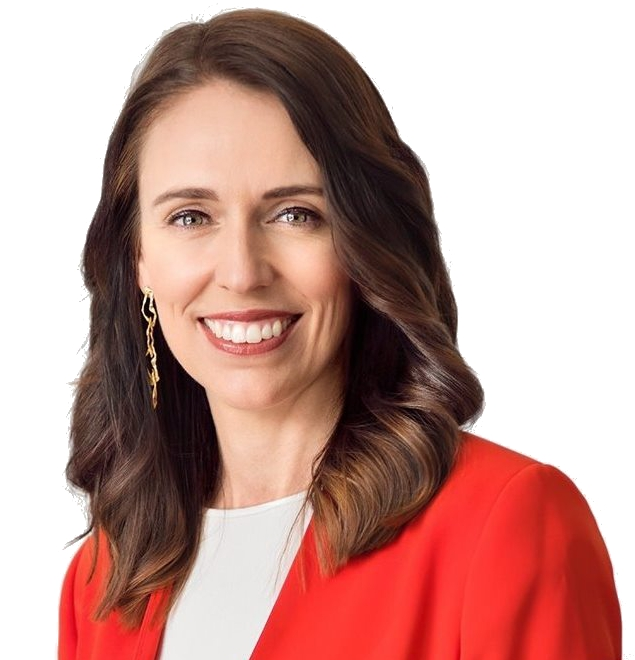
Jacinda Ardern (Mount Albert)

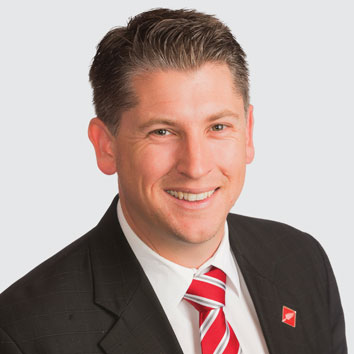
Michael Wood (Mount Roskill)

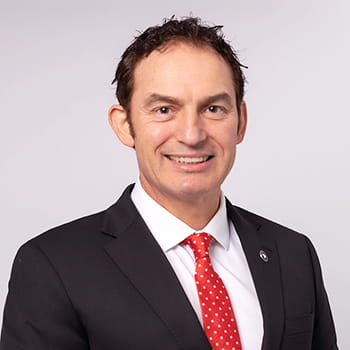
Stuart Nash (Napier)

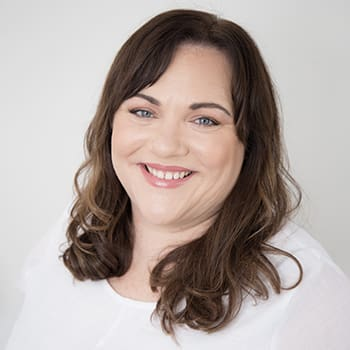
Rachel Boyack (Nelson)

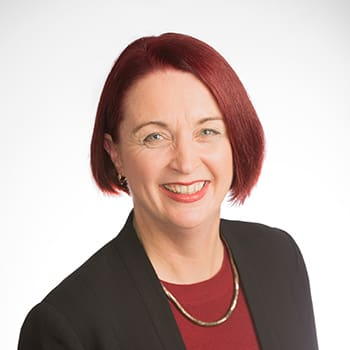
Deborah Russell (New Lynn)

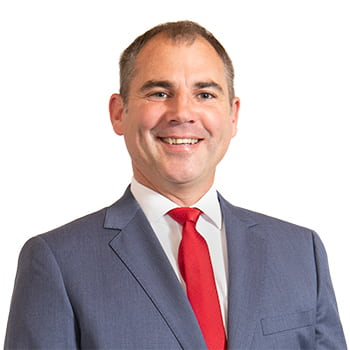
Glen Bennett (New Plymouth)

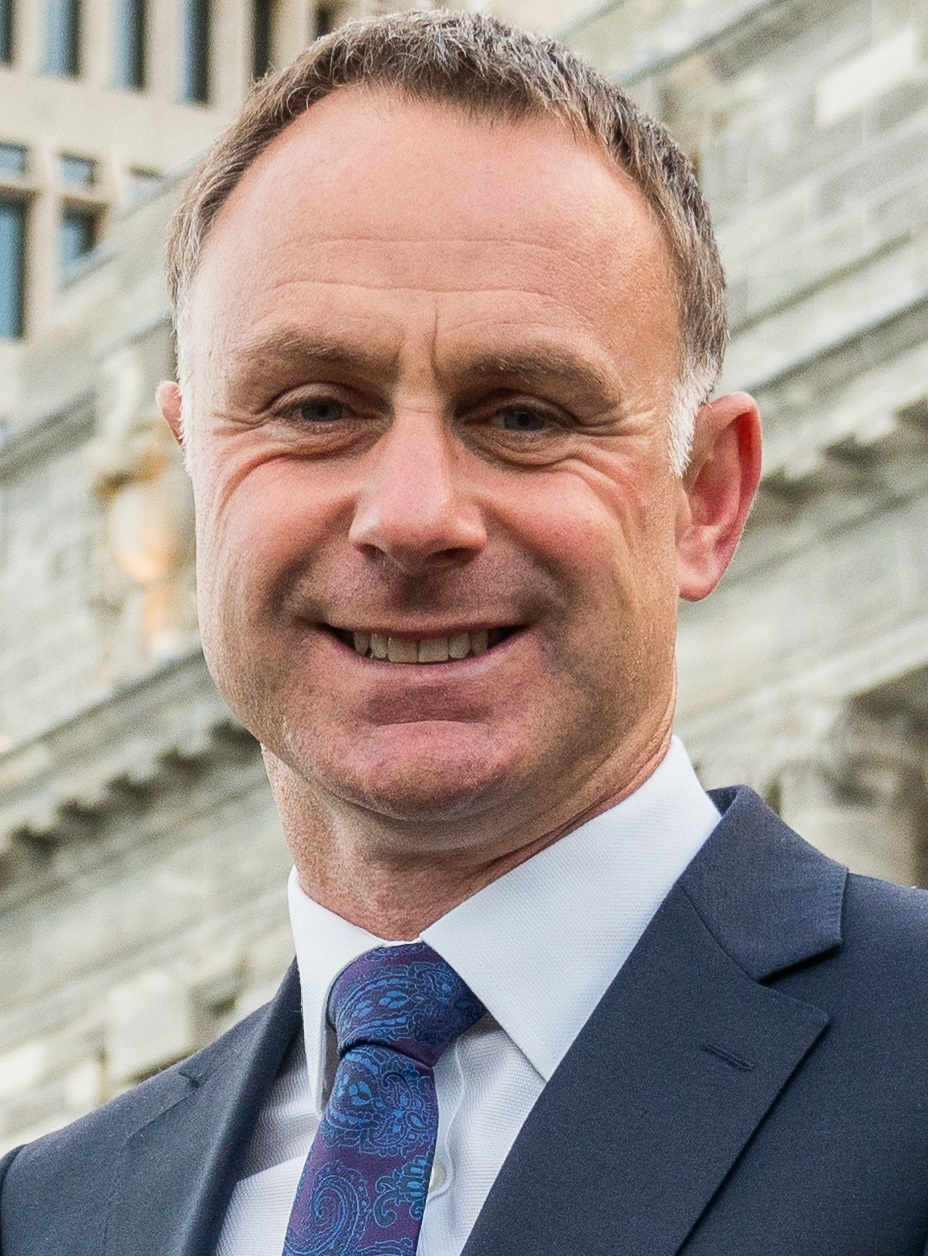
Simon Watts (North Shore)

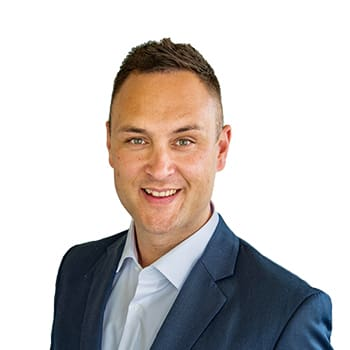
Shanan Halbert (Northcote)

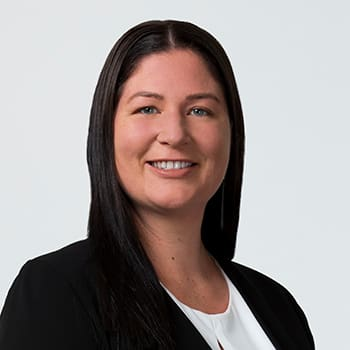
Willow-Jean Prime (Northland)

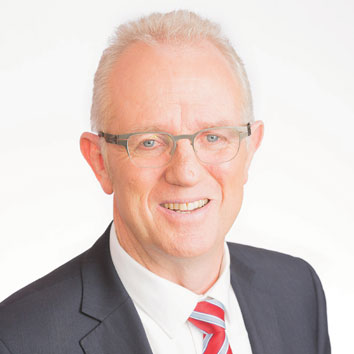
Greg O'Connor (Ōhāriu)

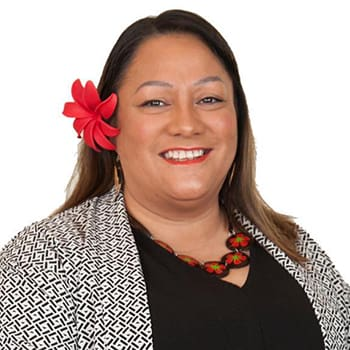
Terisa Ngobi (Ōtaki)

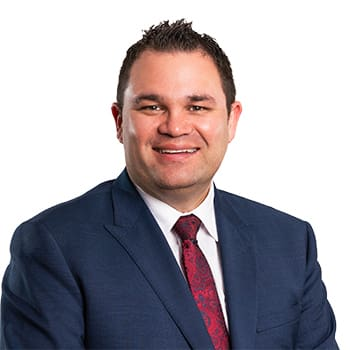
Tangi Utikere (Palmerston North)

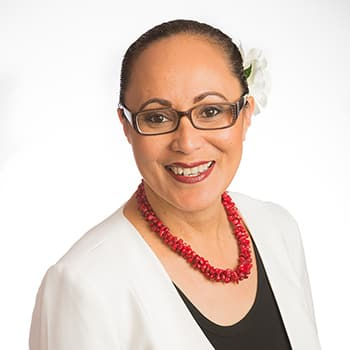
Jenny Salesa (Panmure-Ōtāhuhu)

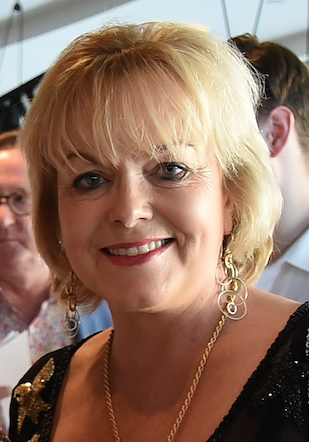
Judith Collins (Papakura)

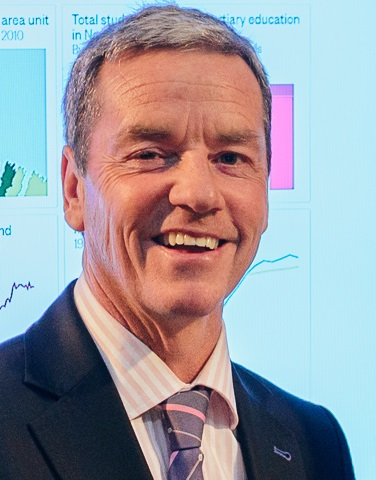
Andrew Bayly (Port Waikato)

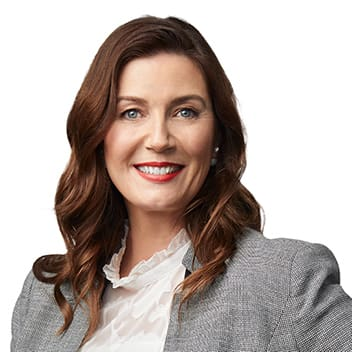
Jo Luxton (Rangitata)

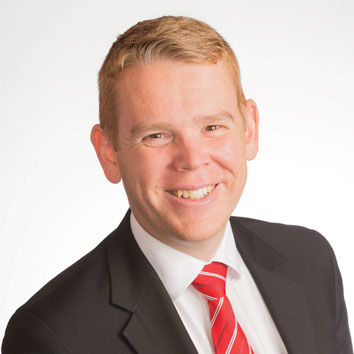
Chris Hipkins (Remutaka)

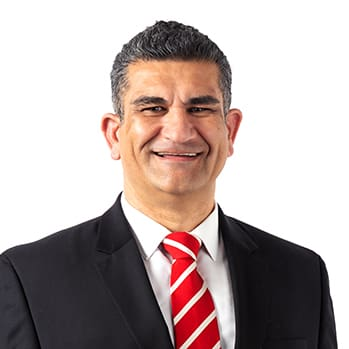
Paul Eagle (Rongotai)

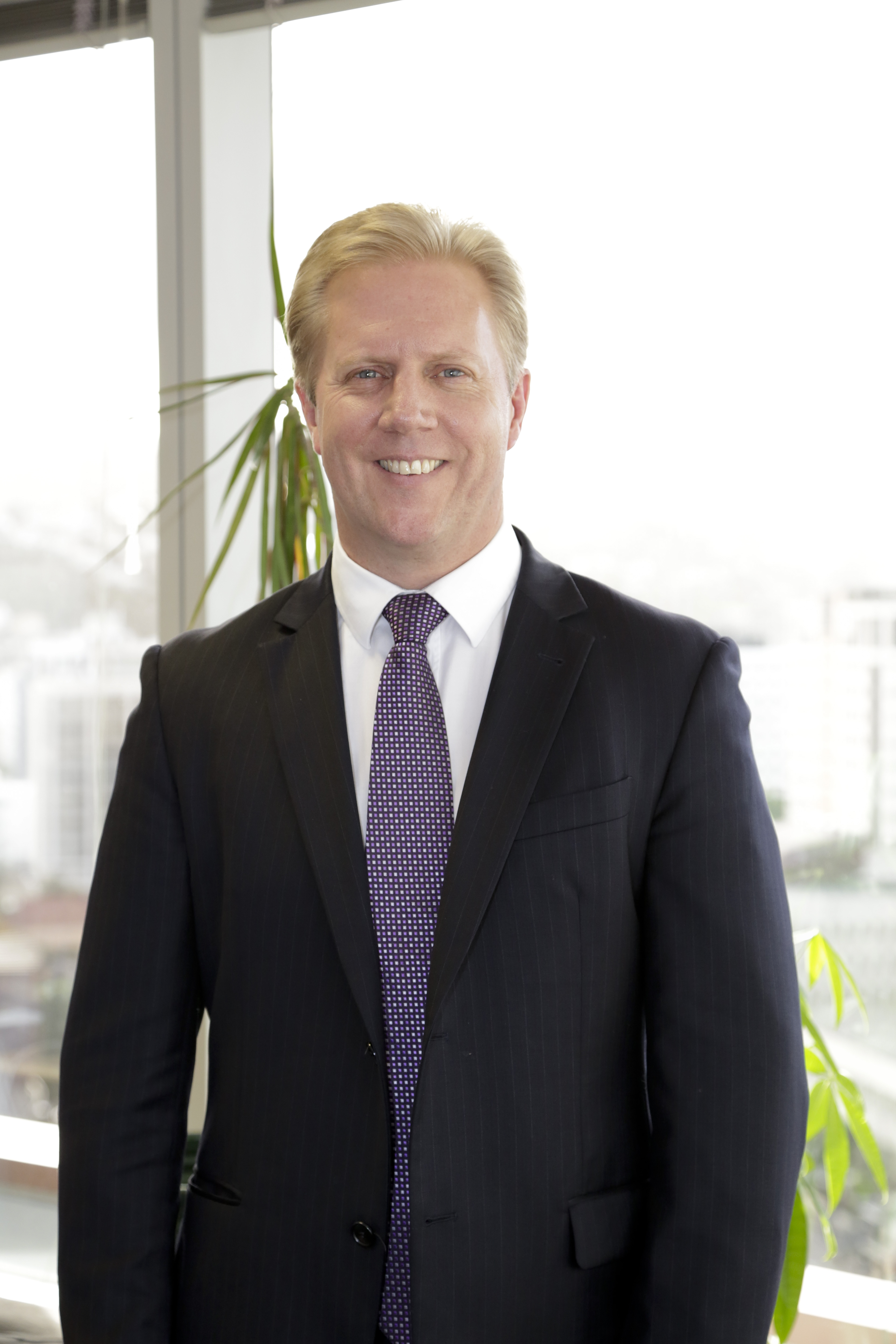
Todd McClay (Rotorua)

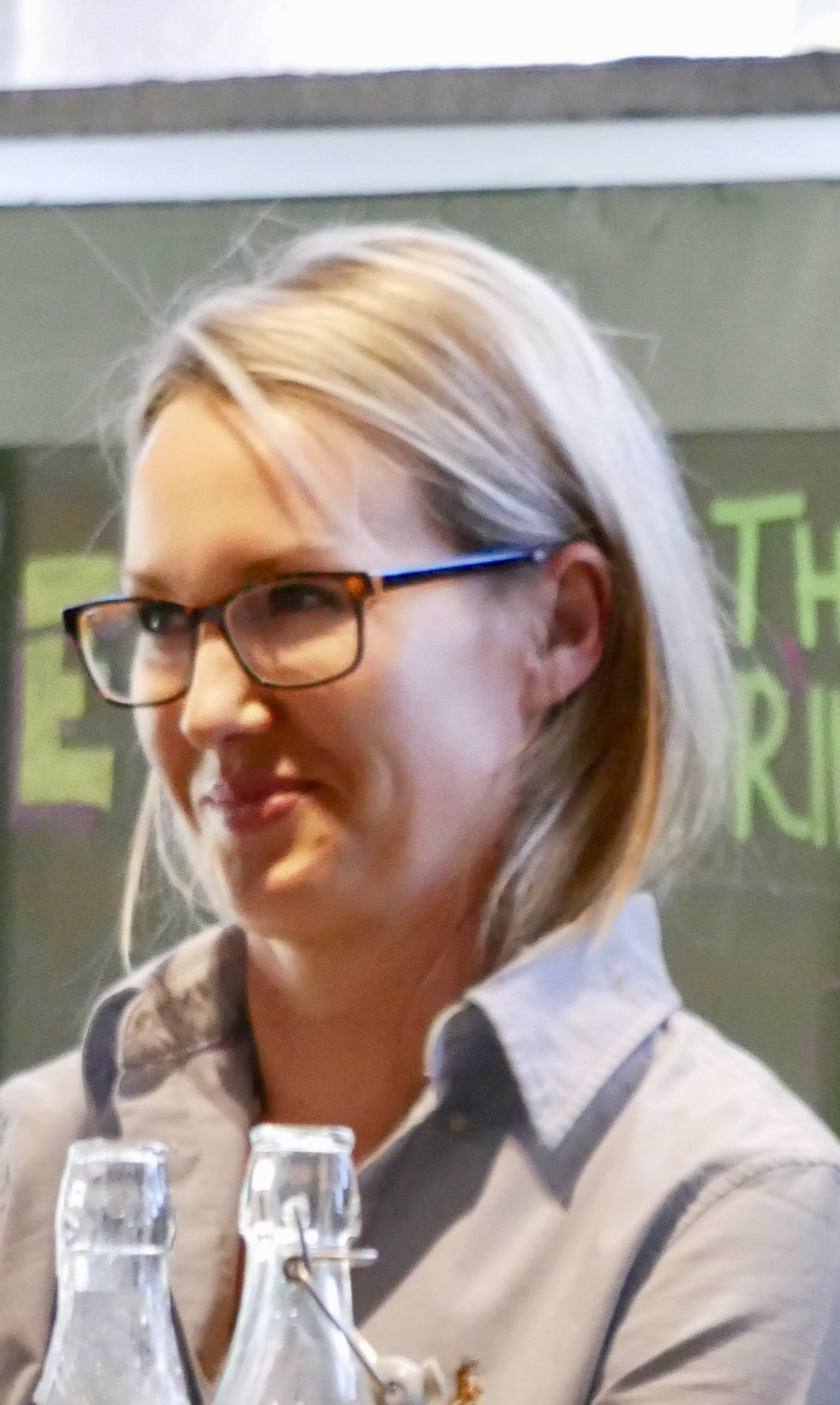
Nicola Grigg (Selwyn)

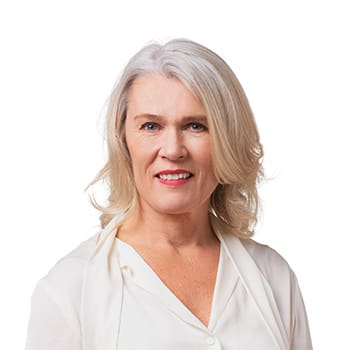
Ingrid Leary (Taieri)

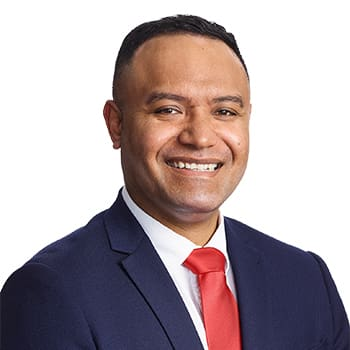
Neru Leavasa (Takanini)

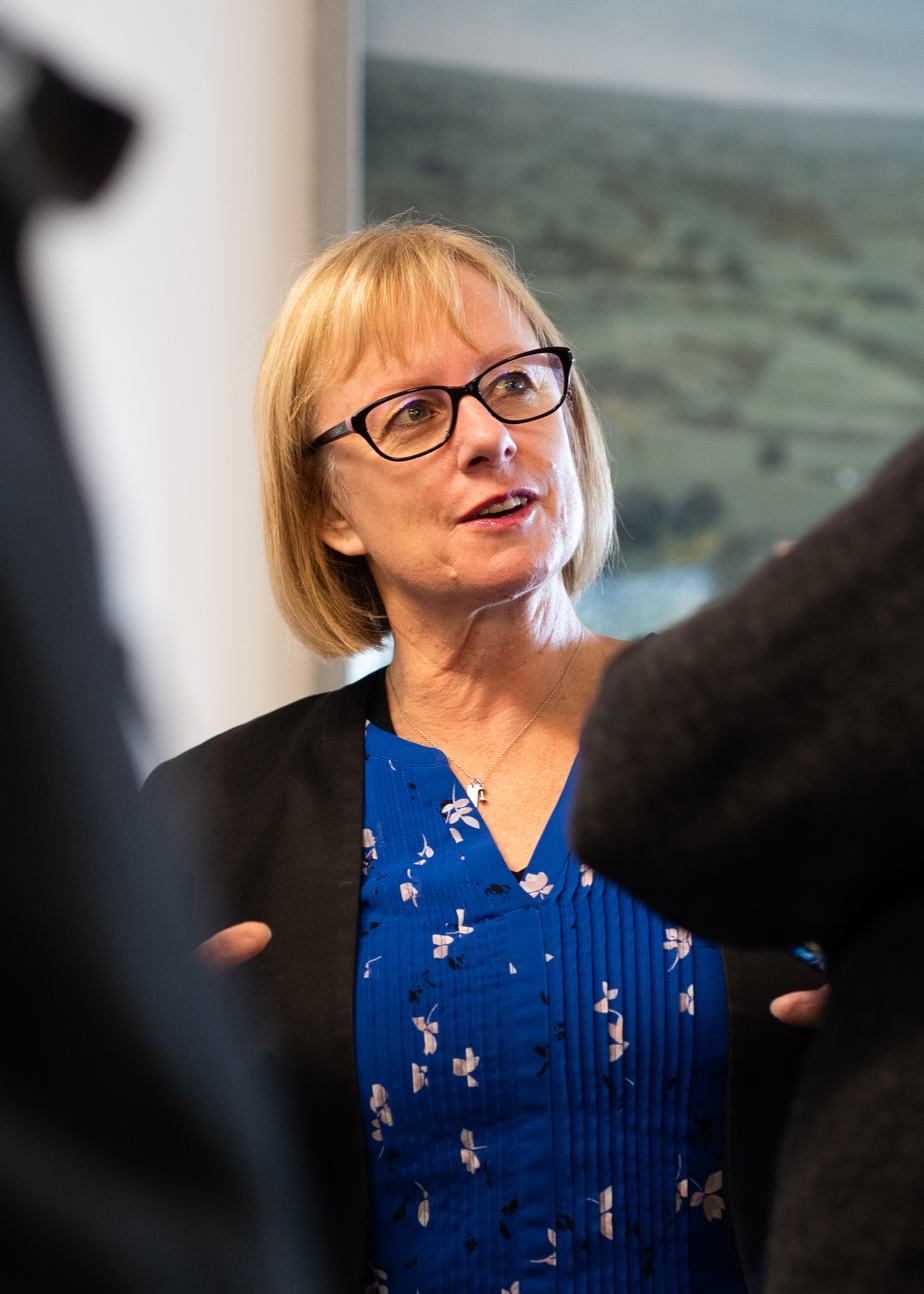
Barbara Kuriger (Taranaki-King Country)

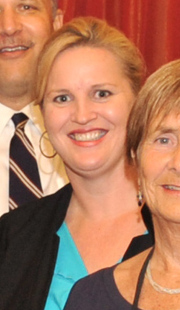
Louise Upston (Taupō)

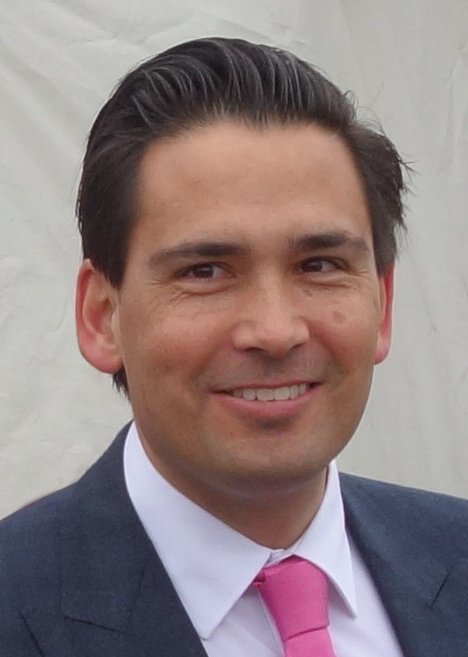
Simon Bridges (Tauranga)

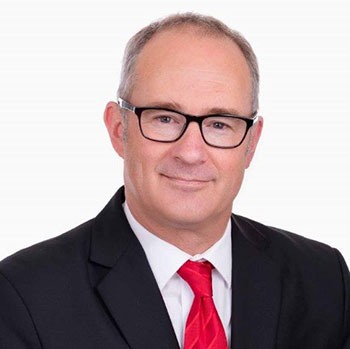
Phil Twyford (Te Atatū)

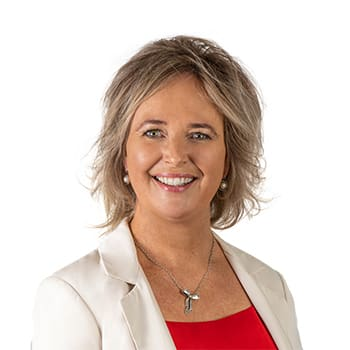
Anna Lorck (Tukituki)

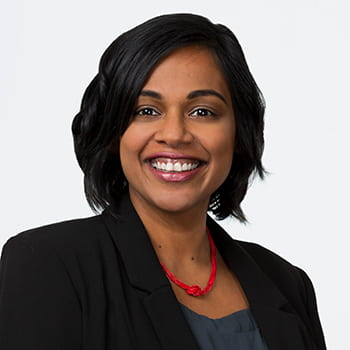
Vanushi Walters (Upper Harbour)

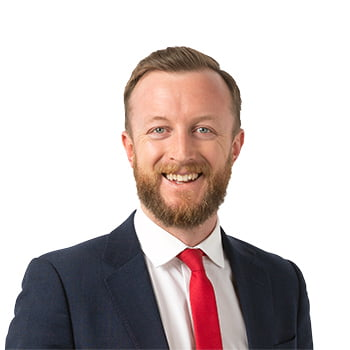
Kieran McAnulty (Wairarapa)

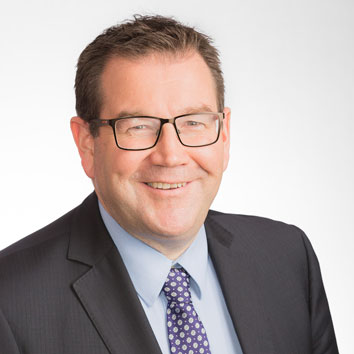
Grant Robertson (Wellington Central)

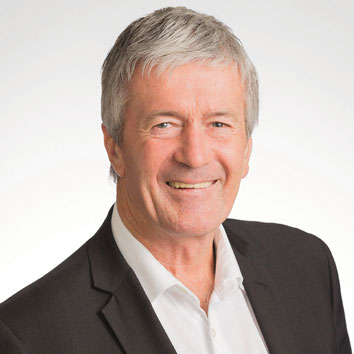
Damien O'Connor (West Coast-Tasman)

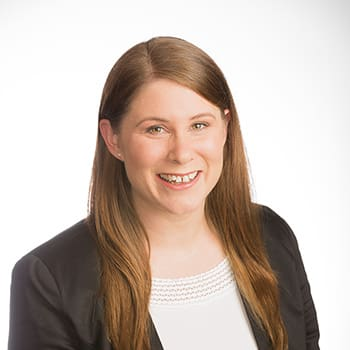
Steph Lewis (Whanganui)

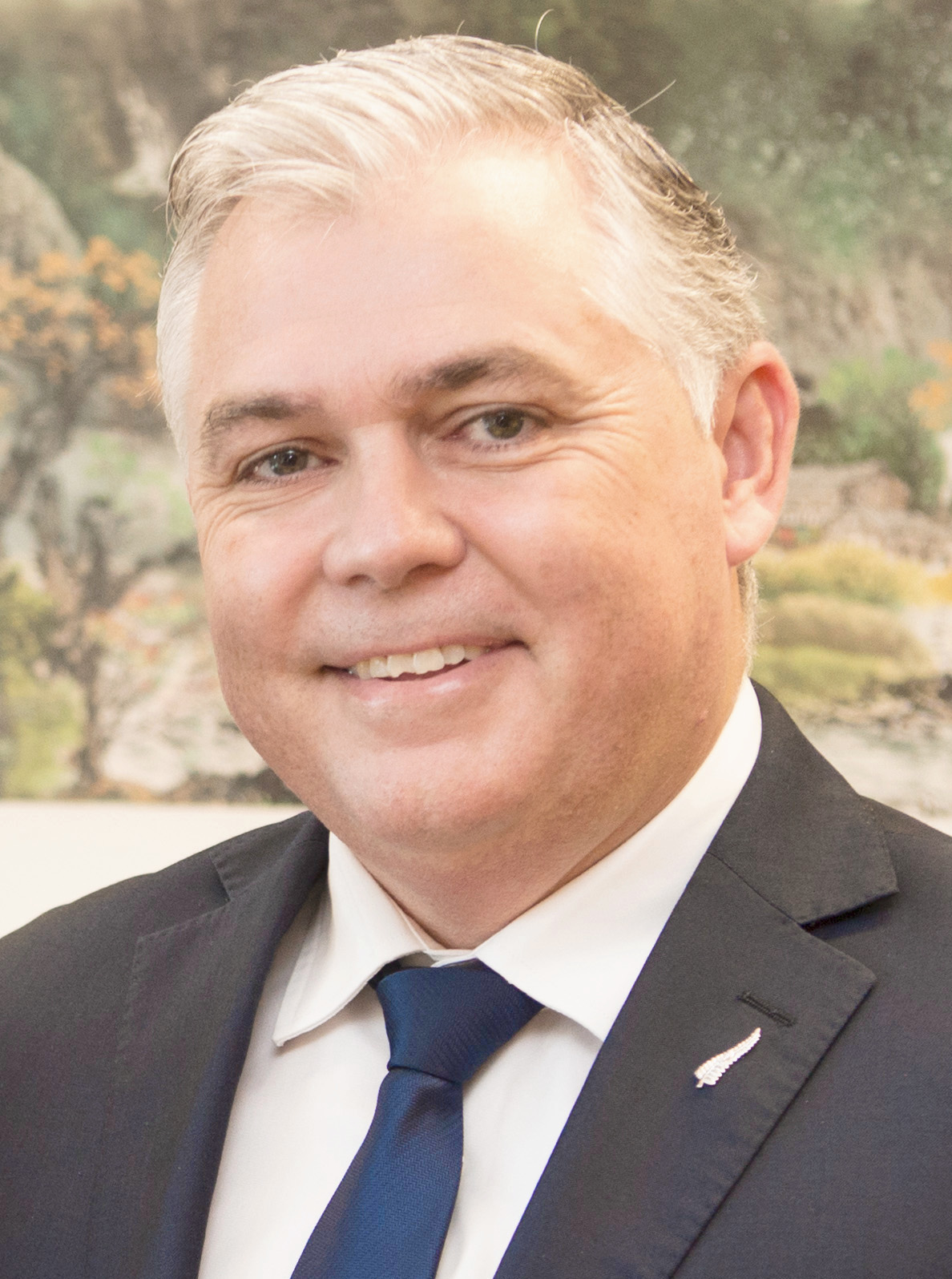
Mark Mitchell (Whangaparāoa)

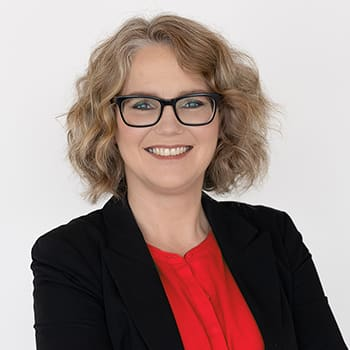
Emily Henderson (Whangārei)

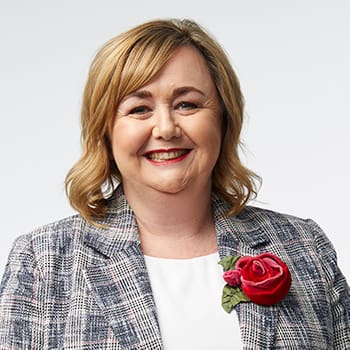
Megan Woods (Wigram)

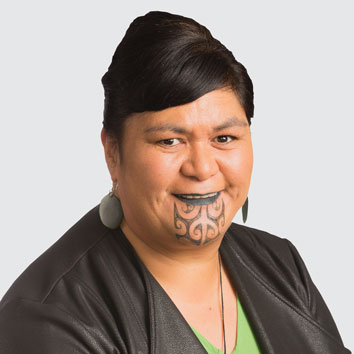
Nanaia Mahuta (Hauraki-Waikato)

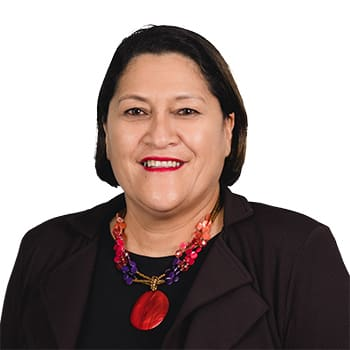
Meka Whaitiri (Ikaroa-Rāwhiti)

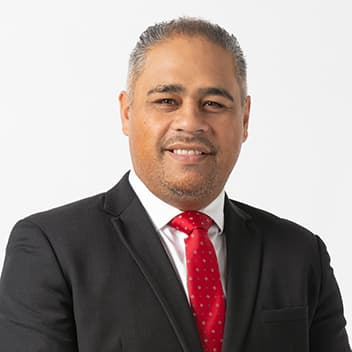
Peeni Henare (Tāmaki Makaurau)

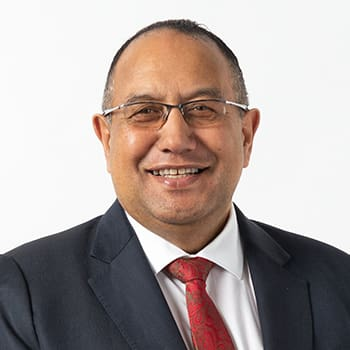
Adrian Rurawhe (Te Tai Hauāuru)

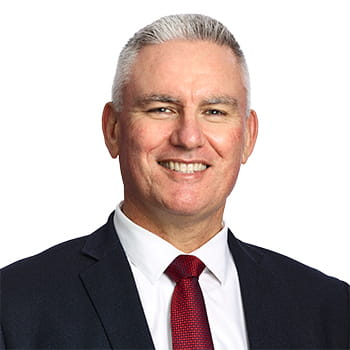
Kelvin Davis (Te Tai Tokerau)

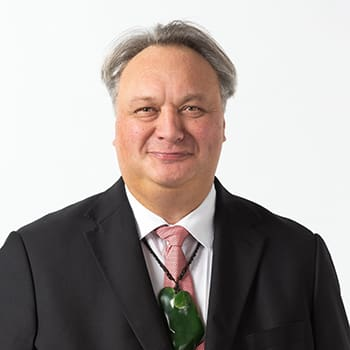
Rino Tirikatene (Te Tai Tonga)

=== List results ===
The following list candidates were elected:

| Labour | National | Green | ACT | Māori |
| Andrew Little (07); David Parker (09); Trevor Mallard (11); Kris Faafoi (15); Ayesha Verrall (17); Willie Jackson (19); Louisa Wall (27); Camilla Belich (30); Jan Tinetti (32); Marja Lubeck (34); Angie Warren-Clark (35); Tāmati Coffey (37); Naisi Chen (38); Liz Craig (41); Ibrahim Omer (42); Anahila Kanongata'a-Suisuiki (44); Rachel Brooking (46); Helen White (48); Angela Roberts (50) | Gerry Brownlee (02); Paul Goldsmith (03); Shane Reti (05); Chris Bishop (07); David Bennett (11); Michael Woodhouse (12); Nicola Willis (13); Melissa Lee (16); Nick Smith (18); Maureen Pugh (19) | Marama Davidson (01); James Shaw (02); Julie Anne Genter (04); Jan Logie (05); Eugenie Sage (06); Golriz Ghahraman (07); Teanau Tuiono (08); Elizabeth Kerekere (09); Ricardo Menéndez March (10) | Brooke van Velden (02); Nicole McKee (03); Chris Baillie (04); Simon Court (05); James McDowall (06); Karen Chhour (07); Mark Cameron (08); Toni Severin (09); Damien Smith (10) | Debbie Ngarewa-Packer (01) |

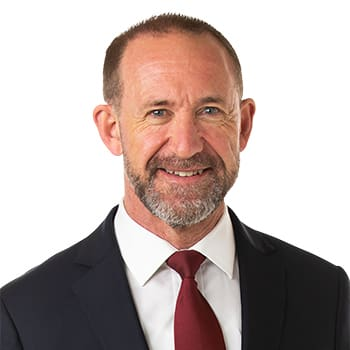
Andrew Little (Labour)

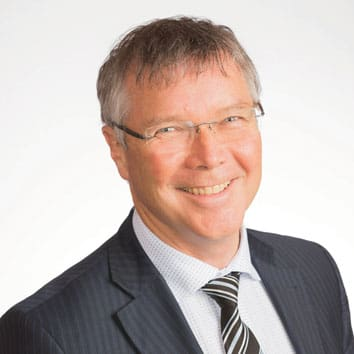
David Parker (Labour)

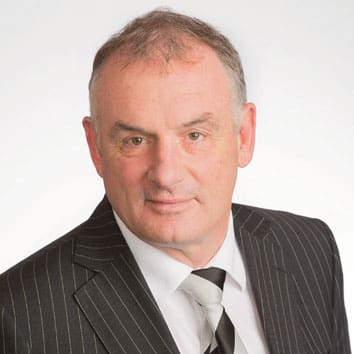
Trevor Mallard (Labour)

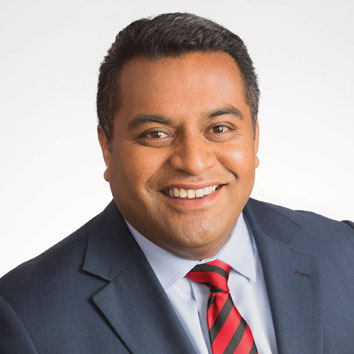
Kris Faafoi (Labour)

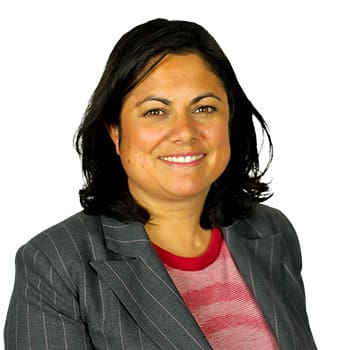
Ayesha Verrall (Labour)

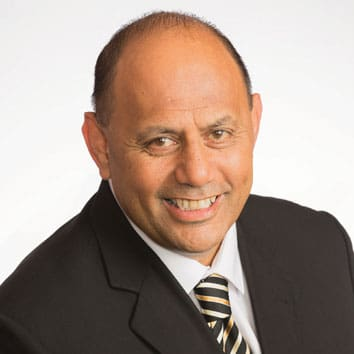
Willie Jackson (Labour)

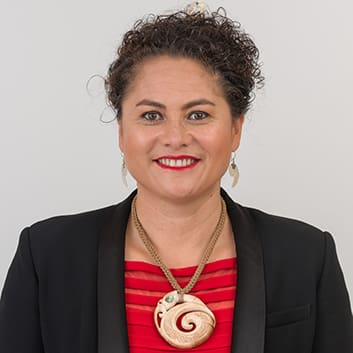
Louisa Wall (Labour)

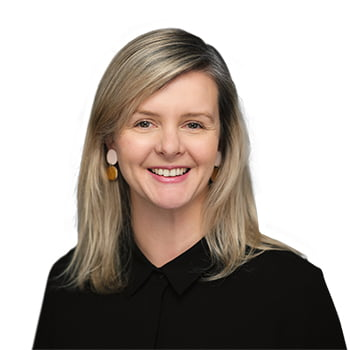
Camilla Belich (Labour)

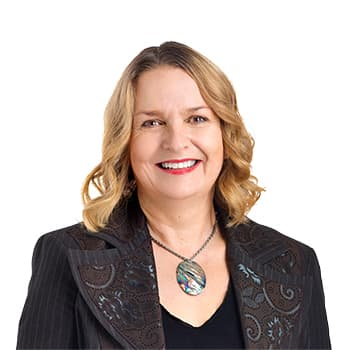
Jan Tinetti (Labour)

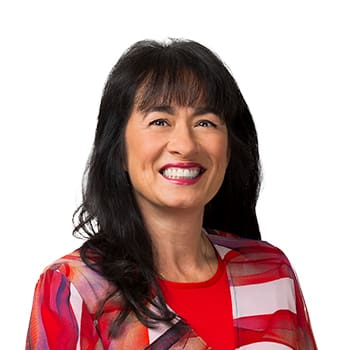
Marja Lubeck (Labour)

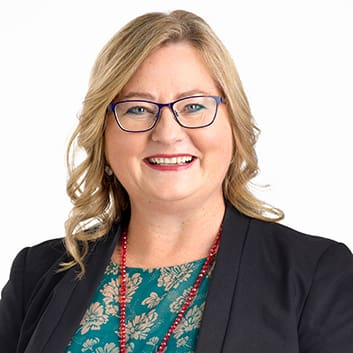
Angie Warren-Clark (Labour)

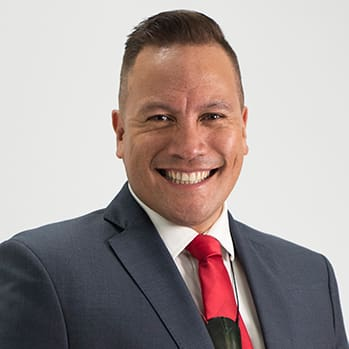
Tāmati Coffey (Labour)

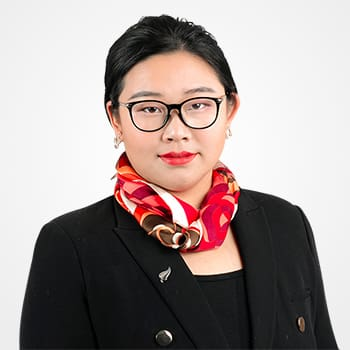
Naisi Chen (Labour)

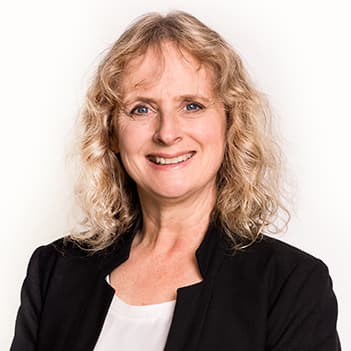
Liz Craig (Labour)

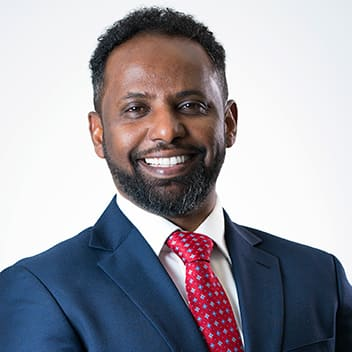
Ibrahim Omer (Labour)

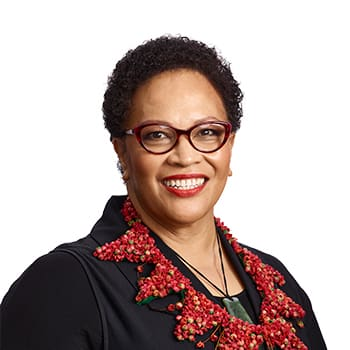
Anahila Kanongata'a-Suisuiki (Labour)

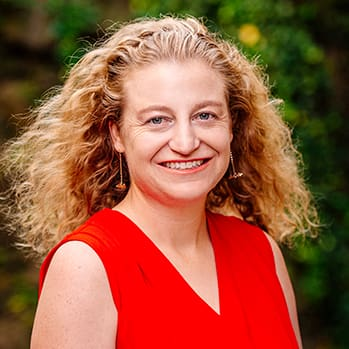
Rachel Brooking (Labour)

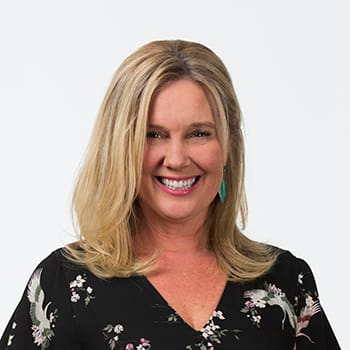
Helen White (Labour)

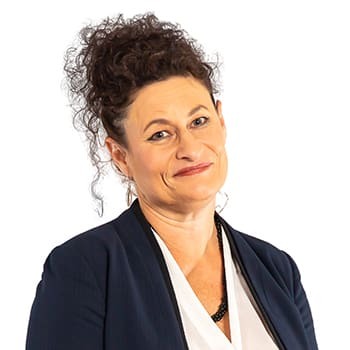
Angela Roberts (Labour)

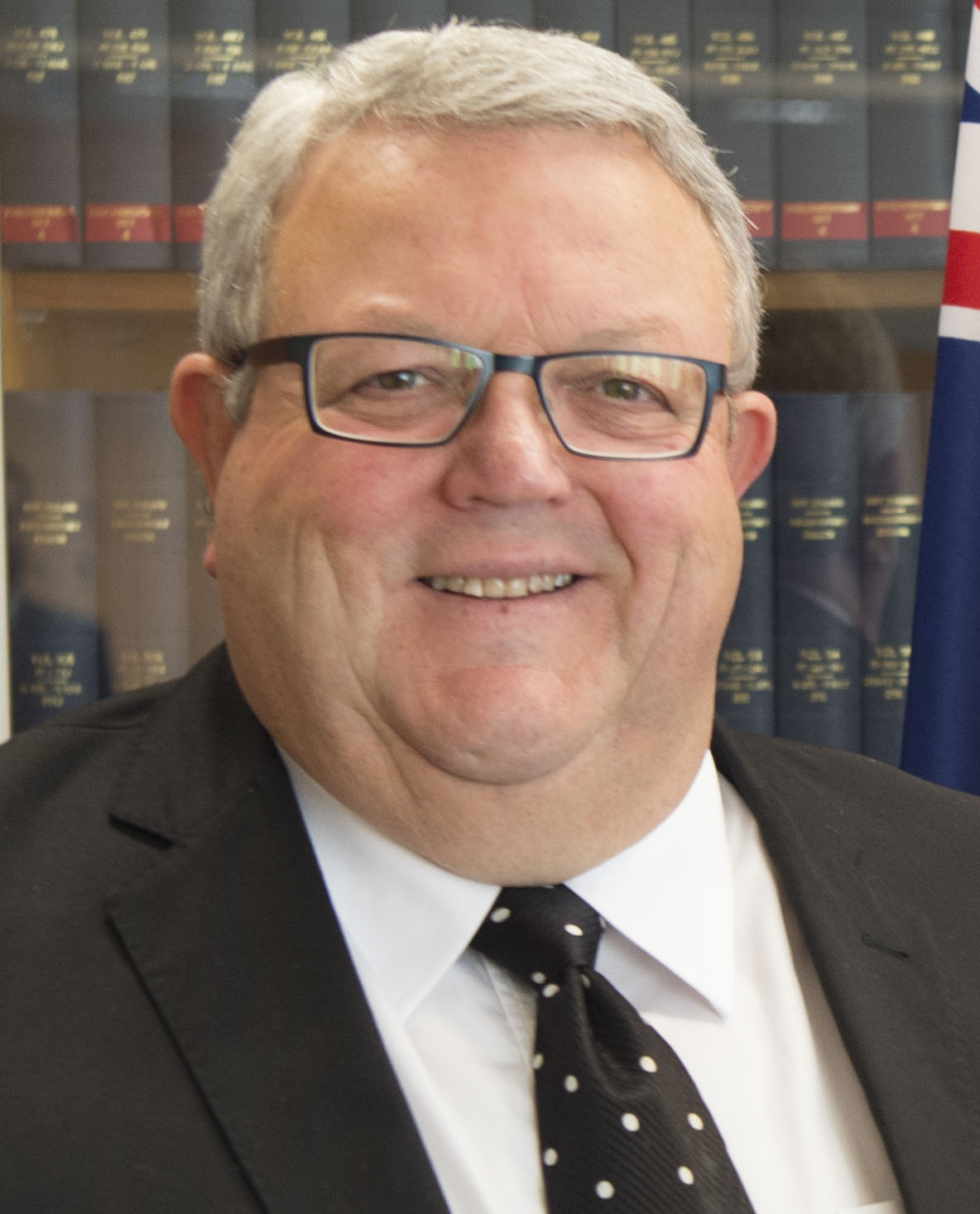
Gerry Brownlee (National)

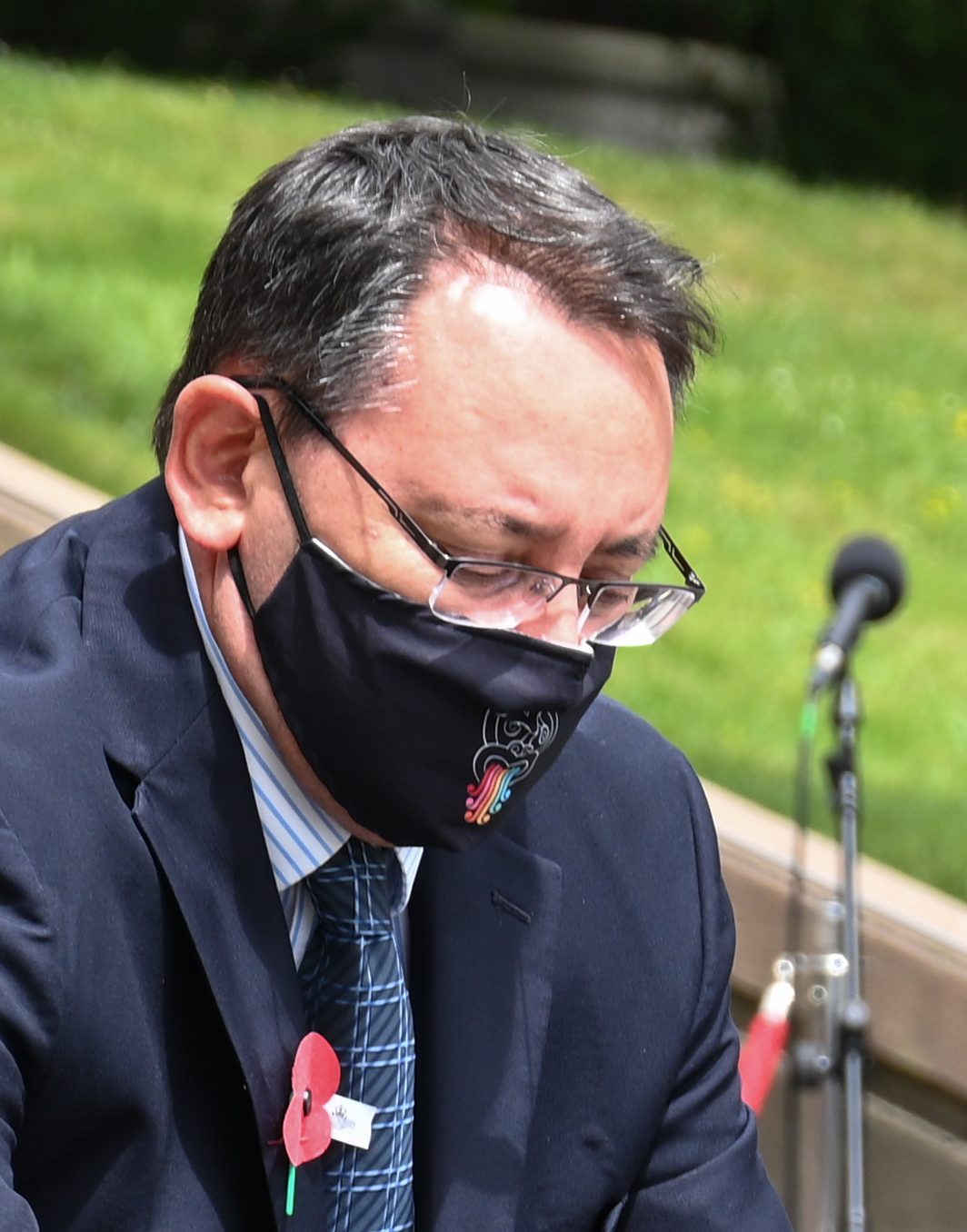
Shane Reti (National)

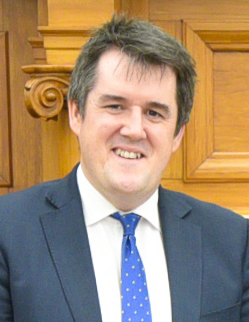
Chris Bishop (National)

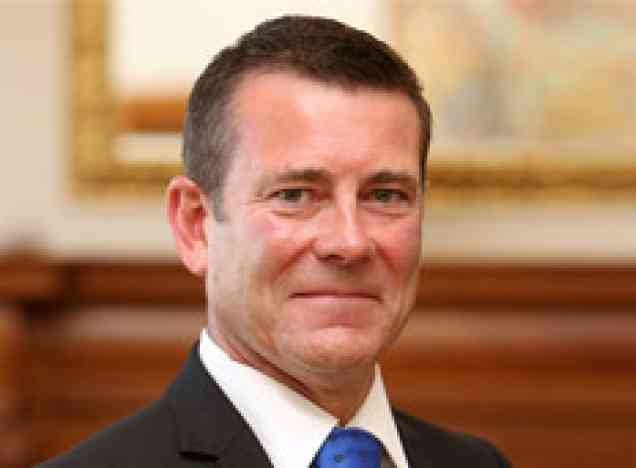
Michael Woodhouse (National)

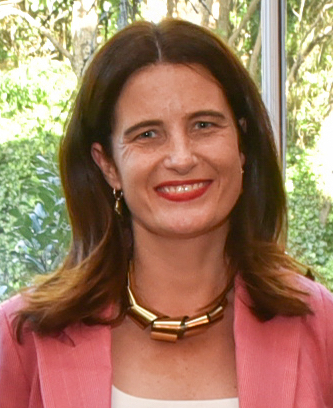
Nicola Willis (National)

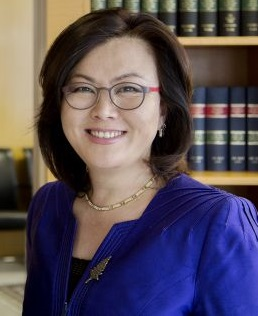
Melissa Lee (National)

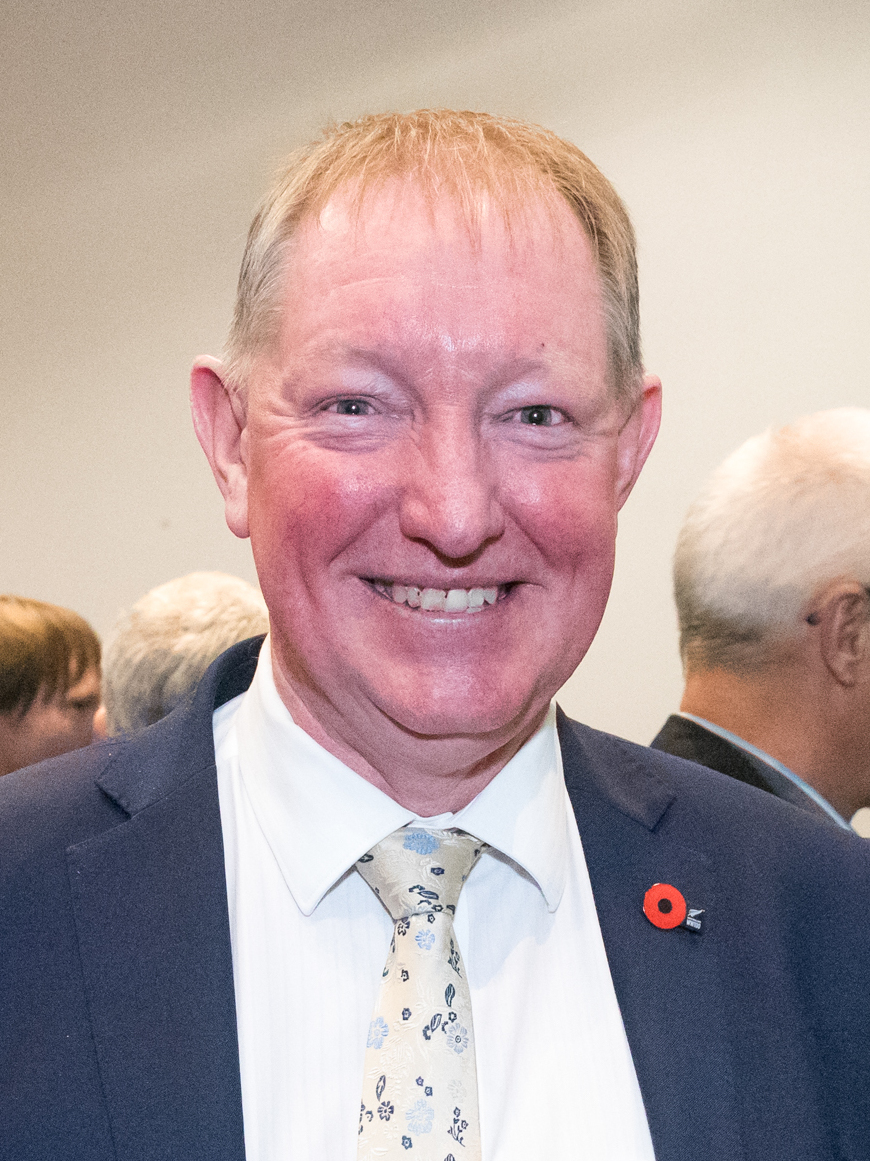
Nick Smith (National)

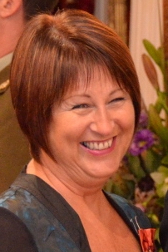
Maureen Pugh (National)

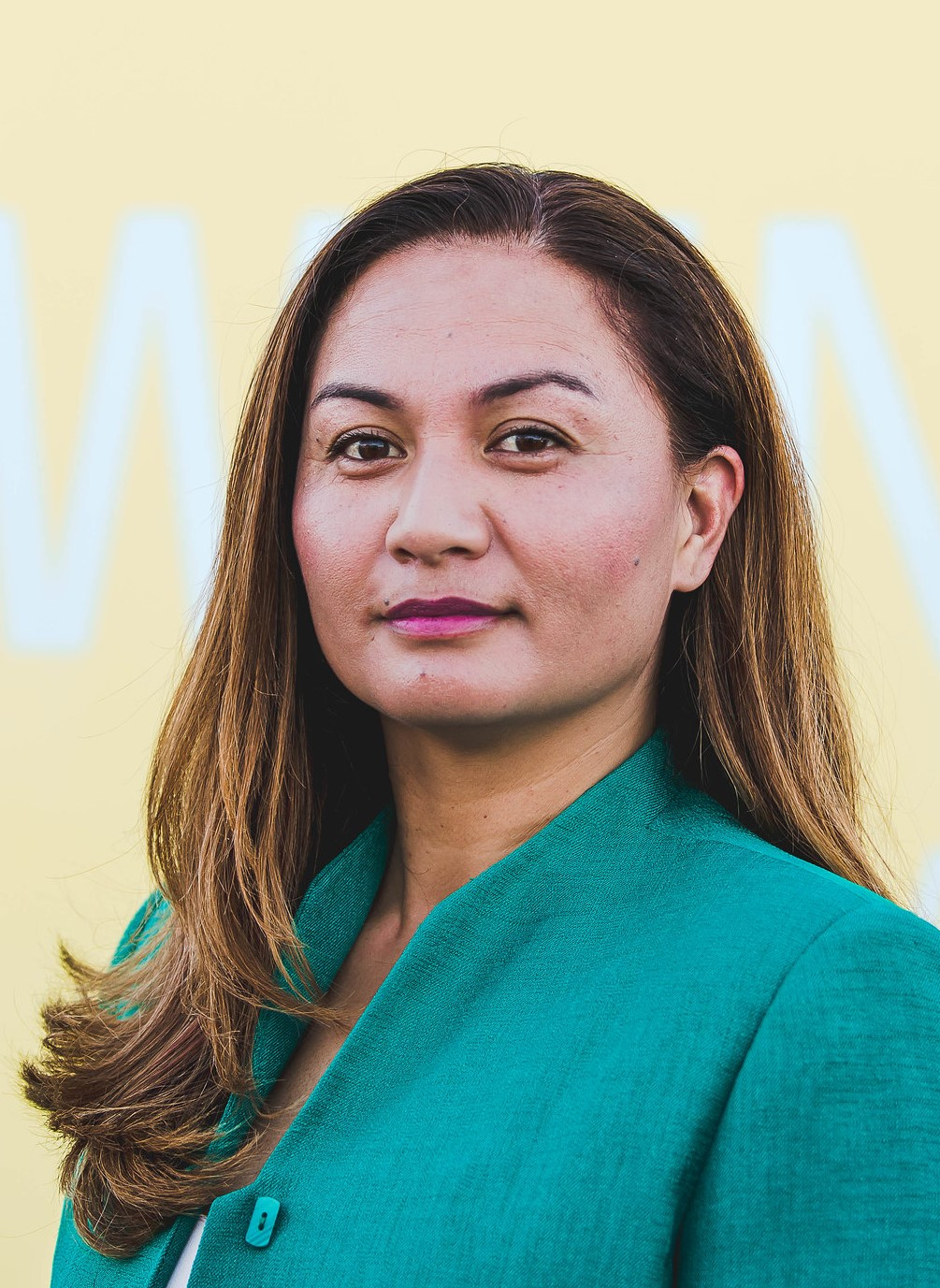
Marama Davidson (Green)

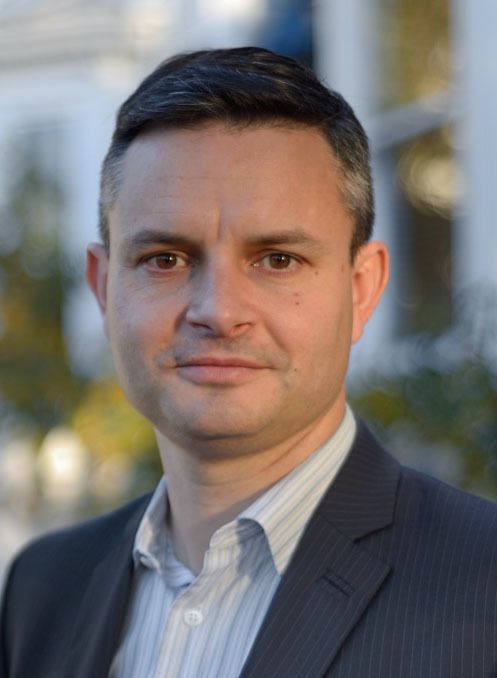
James Shaw (Green)

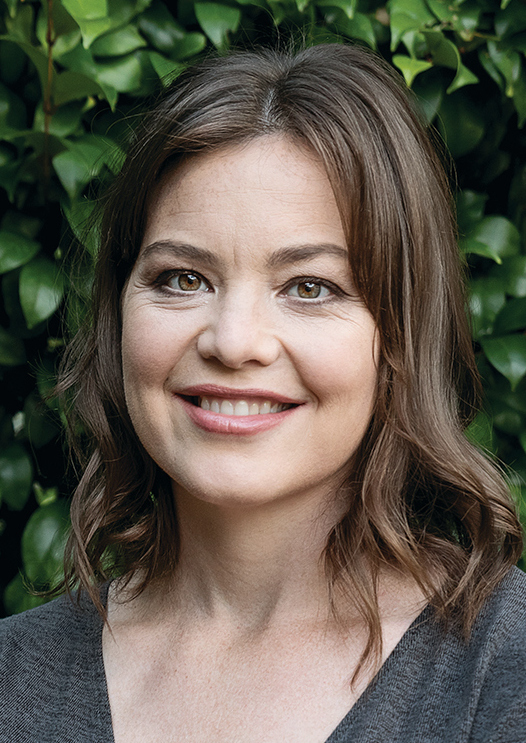
Julie Anne Genter (Green)

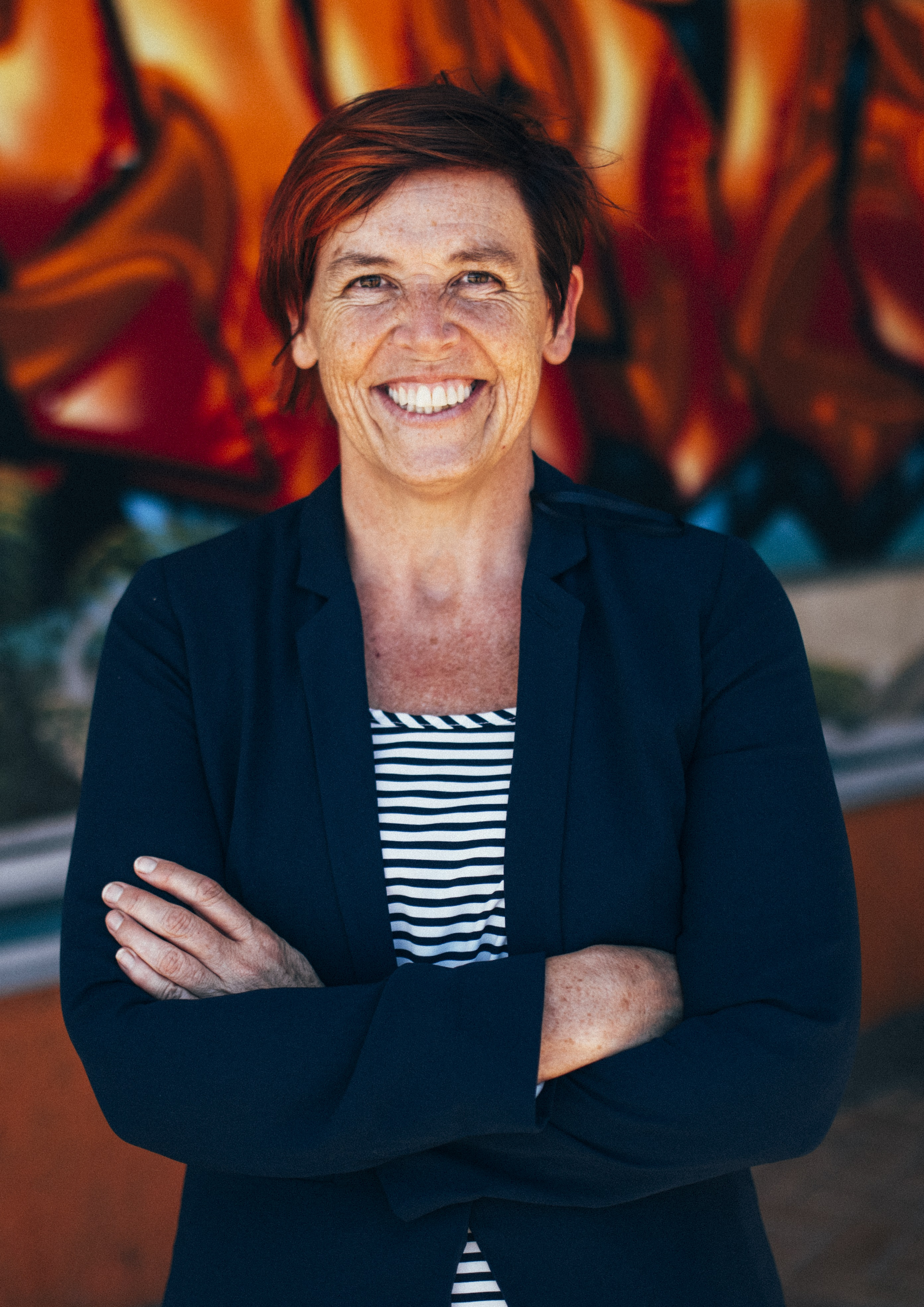
Jan Logie (Green)

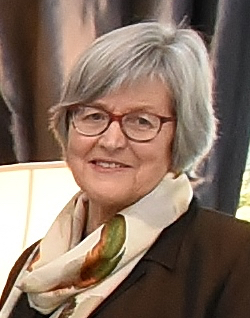
Eugenie Sage (Green)

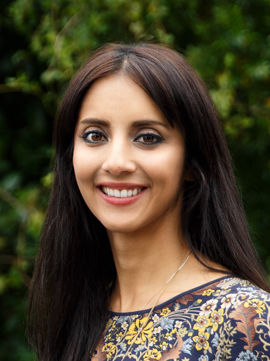
Golriz Ghahraman (Green)

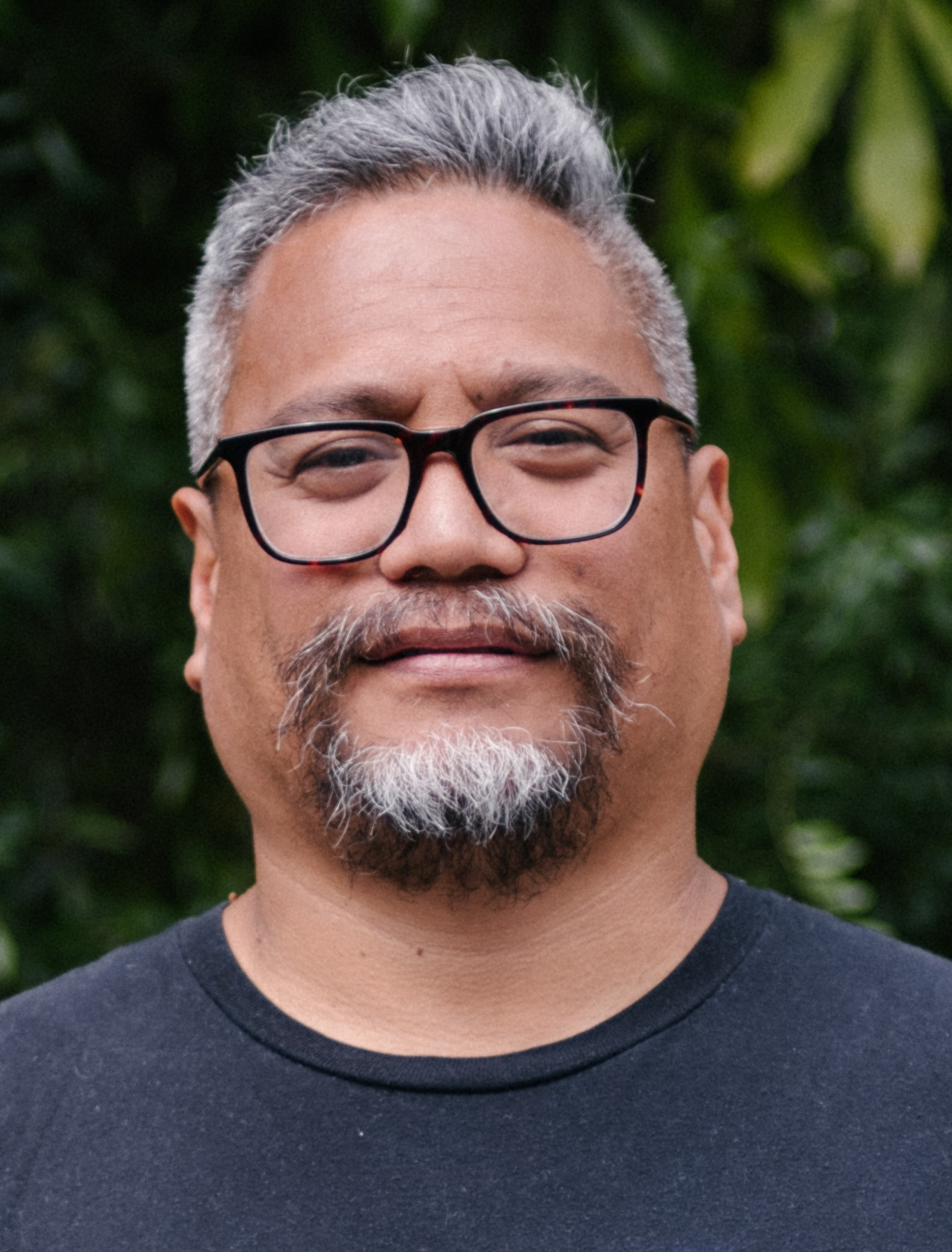
Teanau Tuiono (Green)

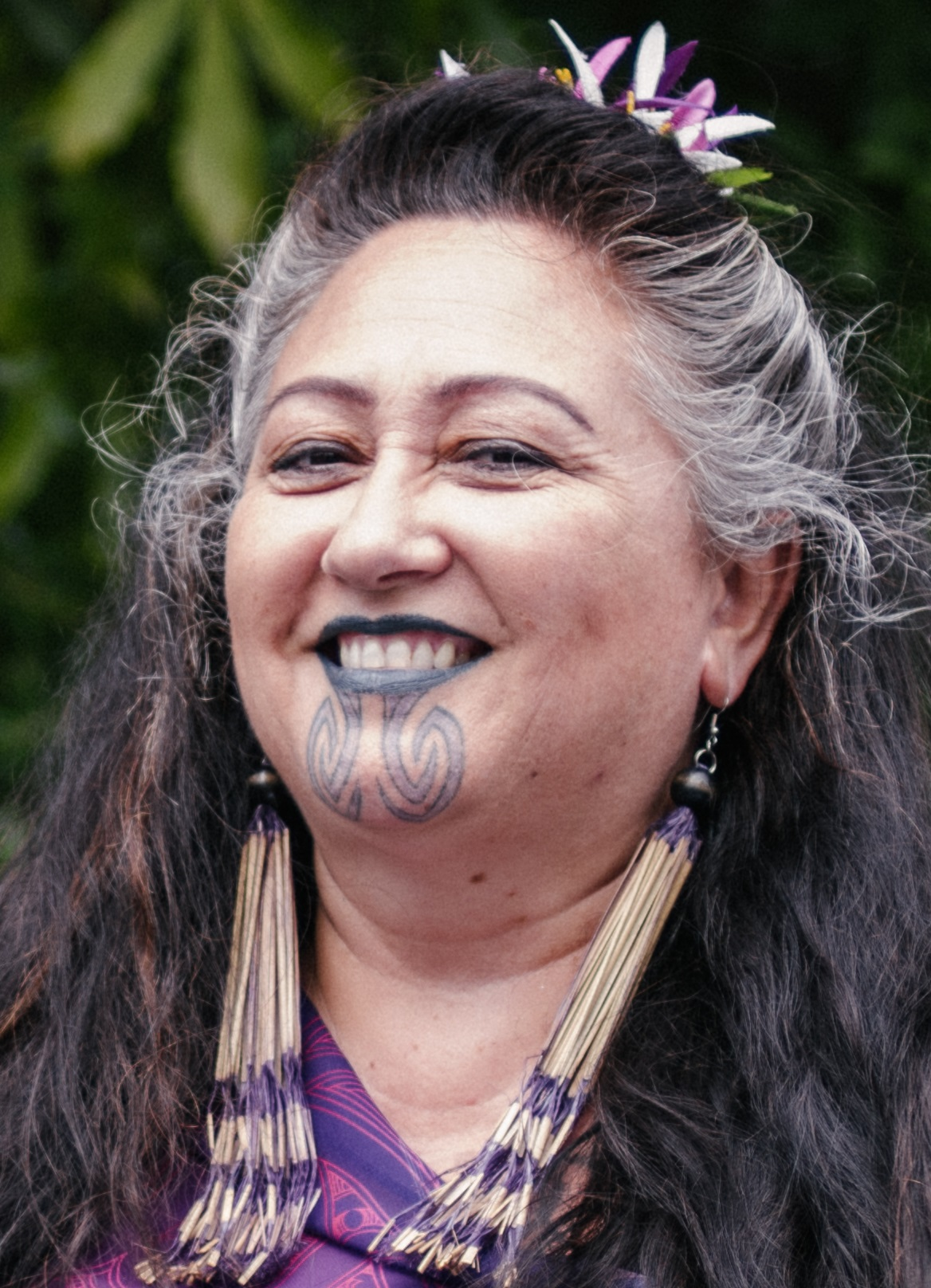
Elizabeth Kerekere (Green)

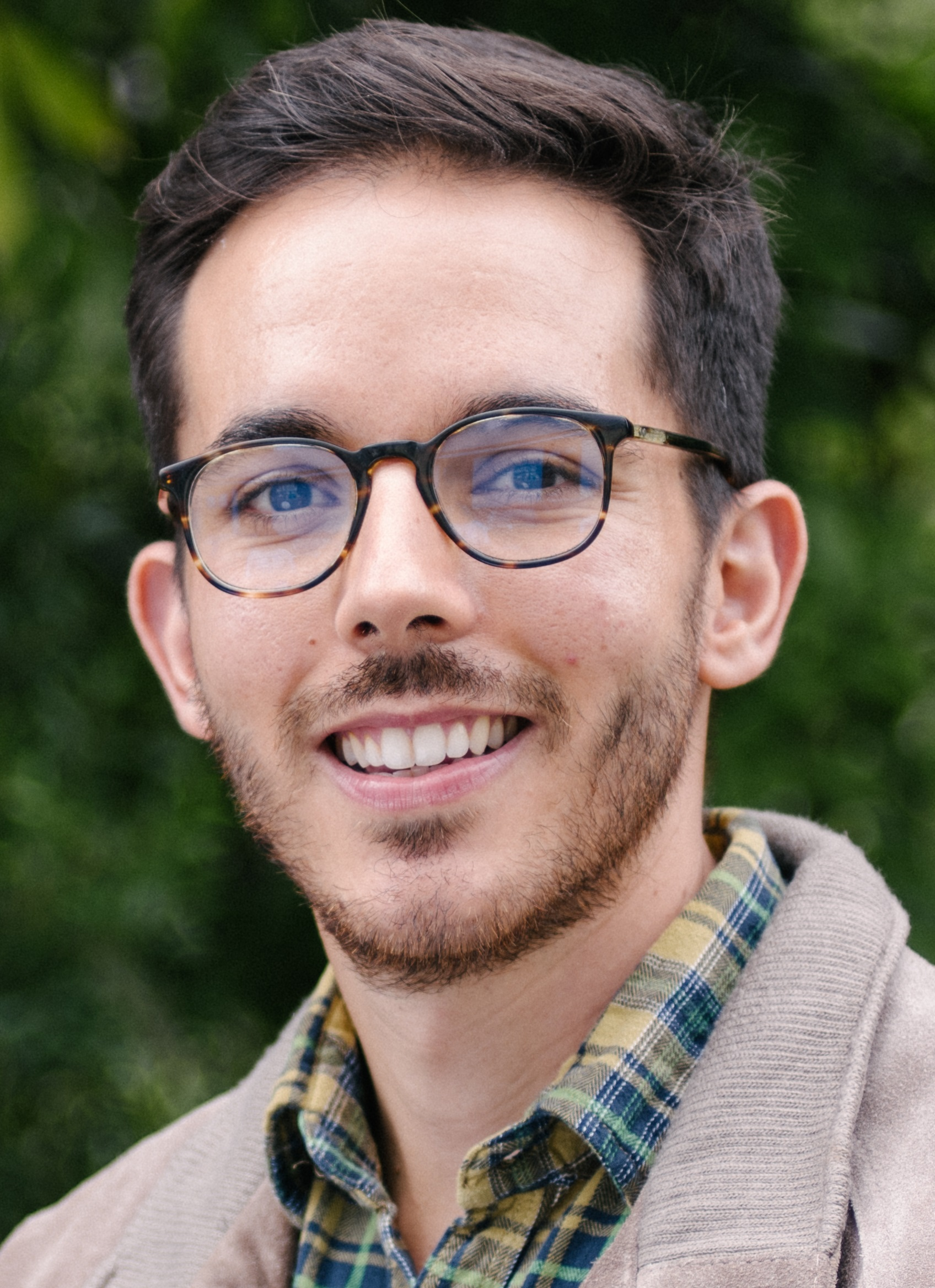
Ricardo Menéndez March (Green)

=== MPs who lost their seats ===
| Name | Party | Electorate/List | Term in office |
|---|---|---|---|
| Jami-Lee Ross | Advance NZ | Botany | 2011–2020 |
| Tim Macindoe | National | Hamilton West | 2008–2020 |
| Denise Lee | National | Maungakiekie | 2017–2020 |
| Jonathan Young | National | New Plymouth | 2008–2020 |
| Dan Bidois | National | Northcote | 2018–2020 |
| Matt King | National | Northland | 2017–2020 |
| Lawrence Yule | National | Tukituki | 2017–2020 |
| Harete Hipango | National | Whanganui | 2017–2020 |
| Kanwaljit Singh Bakshi | National | List | 2008–2020 |
| Paulo Garcia | National | List | 2019–2020 |
| Parmjeet Parmar | National | List | 2014–2020 |
| Agnes Loheni | National | List | 2019–2020 |
| Alfred Ngaro | National | List | 2011–2020 |
| Brett Hudson | National | List | 2014–2020 |
| Jo Hayes | National | List | 2014–2020 |
| Winston Peters | NZ First | List | 1979–1981; 1984–2008; 2011–2020 |
| Fletcher Tabuteau | NZ First | List | 2014–2020 |
| Tracey Martin | NZ First | List | 2011–2020 |
| Shane Jones | NZ First | List | 2005–2014; 2017–2020 |
| Ron Mark | NZ First | List | 1996–2008; 2014–2020 |
| Darroch Ball | NZ First | List | 2014–2020 |
| Mark Patterson | NZ First | List | 2017–2020 |
| Jenny Marcroft | NZ First | List | 2017–2020 |

Depiction of the government formation. While Labour formed a majority government, they chose to invite the Greens to participate in an idiosyncratic "cooperation agreement", which gave the latter two ministers outside cabinet.

=== Government formation ===
On 31 October, Ardern announced that despite the Labour Party having won enough seats to continue the Sixth Labour Government on their own, they had invited the Greens to participate in a "cooperation agreement", seeking their input on matters such as the environment, climate change and child wellbeing, and that the Greens had accepted the offer. Under the deal (which is not a coalition agreement), the two co-leaders of the Greens will receive ministerial portfolios outside the cabinet. James Shaw will continue in his previous role as Minister for Climate Change, as well as associate environment minister (biodiversity). Marama Davidson will be appointed to the new position of Minister for the Prevention of Family and Sexual Violence, and will also take on the role of associate minister of housing (homelessness). The Green Party also agreed to abstain on motions of confidence and supply during the term.

== Post-election events ==
=== Leadership changes ===
Following the election, Gerry Brownlee stepped down as deputy leader of the National Party. On 10 November 2020, Shane Reti was elected unopposed as his replacement. Leader Judith Collins was also unopposed to retain her position.

On 3 November, Geoff Simmons stepped down as leader of The Opportunities Party. Shai Navot, former deputy leader, took over from Simmons.

On 19 November, the board of the New Conservative Party removed the party's leader, Leighton Baker, and replaced him with his deputy, Elliot Ikilei. The party's third-ranked list candidate at the election, Victoria O'Brien, became deputy leader. O'Brien however resigned after less than a week in the role, on 25 November, amid apparent division in the party over Baker's removal and his subsequent role within its organisation. Ikilei announced his resignation on New Year's Eve.

=== Local by-elections ===
A number of local by-elections are required due to the resignation of an incumbent local body politician following their election to Parliament:

- Palmerston North City Council by-election: Deputy Mayor of Palmerston North Tangi Utikere resigned his seat on the council after he was elected MP for Palmerston North, necessitating a by-election to fill the councillor vacancy. The election took place on 17 February 2021, with Orphée Mickalad being elected councillor.
- Māngere-Ōtāhuhu Local Board by election: Local board member Neru Leavasa resigned his seat after he was elected MP for Takanini, necessitating a by-election to fill the vacancy. The by-election saw Communities and Residents candidate Malcolm Turner make allegations of voter interference against Labour candidate Papaliitele Lafulafu Peo. Peo was declared the winner on 19 February 2021.

=== Calls for vote recount ===
On 11 November, the Māori Party co-leader John Tamihere requested a vote recount in the Māori electorates of Tāmaki Makaurau and Te Tai Hauāuru, alleging there had been voter discrimination against Māori during the 2020 election. Tamihere claimed that the recount was intended to expose discriminatory laws such as the five-yearly Māori Electoral Option (which limited the ability of Māori to switch between the general and Māori rolls for a period five years), longer wait times for Māori voters at election booths, and some Māori not being allowed to vote on the Māori roll. The altered official results for the two electorates following the recounts were released on 20 November. Tamihere's margin of defeat in Tāmaki Makaurau decreased from 956 to 927, while Debbie Ngarewa-Packer's margin of defeat in Te Tai Hauāuru increased from 1,035 to 1,053.

=== Election donations ===
==== Māori Party ====
On 12 April 2021, the Electoral Commission referred the Māori Party to the Police for failing to disclose about NZ$320,000 worth of donations within the required timeframe. These donations came from former party co-leader John Tamihere (NZ$158,223.72), the Urban Māori Authority (NZ$48,879.85), and the Aotearoa Te Kahu Limited Partnership (NZ$120,000). Party President Che Wilson attributed the late disclosure to the fact that the party was staffed by volunteers and rookies who were unfamiliar with electoral finance laws. In late April, the Police referred the investigation into the Māori Party's undeclared donations to the Serious Fraud Office. By late September 2022, the Serious Fraud Office had closed the investigation and declined to prosecute the individuals and parties involved.

In late September 2022, Charities Services general manager Natasha Weight confirmed that the agency was investigating two charities headed by Tamihere, the Te Whānau Waipareira Trust and the National Urban Māori Authority, for financing his 2020 election campaign. Existing charities legislation bans charities from donating or endorsing political parties and candidates. Political parties and candidates are not allowed to use charities' resources. According to the Charities Register, Te Whānau o Waipareira Trust Group had provided NZ$385,307 in interest free loans to support Tamihere's 2020 election campaign while the National Urban Māori Authority had paid Tamihere NZ$82,695 to support his 2020 election campaign and Māori Party aspirations. In response, Tamihere accused the Charities Services of racism and confirmed that he and the Māori Party would challenge the Charities Service if the agency ruled against them.

==== National Party ====
In late April 2021, the Electoral Commission issued the National Party with a warning for failing to declare a NZ$35,000 donation from real estate mogul Garth Barfoot but declined to refer the matter to the police.

==== Advance New Zealand ====
Several Advance New Zealand candidates also faced fines for not filing campaign donations and expense returns. In late May 2021, Rangitīkei candidate Ricky Cribb pleaded guilty to two charges of violating the Electoral Act 1993 and was fined $300 plus court costs. Mana candidate Edward James Ngatai Ponder pleaded guilty to violating the Electoral Act 1993 in mid June 2021 for failing to file an election expenses return to show that would have shown he had no expenses. In early July, Advance NZ Invercargill candidate Kurt Rohloff had his Electoral Act charge for failing to declare election and donation returns dismissed after completing a diversion.

Early July also saw another Invercargill candidate, independent Basil Walker, be charged with failing to file his return on time. Walker was offered a discharge without conviction if he completed 40 hours of community service, but he failed to do so, which he attributed to his workload. In September he agreed to plead guilty to the charge, received a conviction, and was fined $500.

In September 2021, former Public Party leader and Advance NZ co-leader Billy Te Kahika was charged with filing a false electoral donation and obtaining $15,000 by deception. Name suppression lapsed and he was identified in October 2021. Te Kahika has contested the charges and opted for a jury trial.

== See also ==
- Elections in New Zealand
