= Jack Ridley (engineer) =

New Zealand engineer and politician (1919–2006)

Jack Ridley QSO ED

Member of the New Zealand Parliament for Taupo
- In office 25 November 1978 – 28 November 1981
- Preceded by: Ray La Varis
- Succeeded by: Roger McClay
- In office 25 November 1972 – 29 November 1975
- Preceded by: Rona Stevenson
- Succeeded by: Ray La Varis

Personal details
- Born: John Wallace Ridley; 29 April 1919 Invercargill, New Zealand
- Died: 23 August 2006 (aged 87) Auckland, New Zealand
- Party: Labour
- Spouse: Avis Reed (m. 1949)
- Children: 4
- Education: Canterbury University College; University College, Oxford
- Profession: Civil engineer

John Wallace Ridley QSO ED (29 April 1919 – 23 August 2006) was a New Zealand Member of Parliament for Taupo in the North Island, a Rhodes Scholar and a civil engineer. He was notable for his contributions to hydro engineering.

== Early years ==
Ridley was born in Invercargill, New Zealand in 1919. He attended Timaru Boys' High School and then studied engineering at Canterbury University College in Christchurch. After the Second World War (in which he served as an engineering officer) he spent two years, 1946–1947, as a Rhodes Scholar at University College, University of Oxford, graduating with an MA (Honours) in engineering science. He married Avis (née Reed) in 1949.

Ridley was a civil engineer of dams for power schemes like Benmore Dam in the South Island and Wairakei in the North Island, working for the Ministry of Works and Development. For his contributions, he was awarded with the Fulton Gold Medal, at the time the highest award of the New Zealand Institution of Engineers.

== Political career ==
=== Member of Parliament ===
New Zealand Parliament
Years	Term	Electorate	Party
1972–1975	37th	Taupo	Labour
1978–1981	39th	Taupo	Labour

Ridley was the MP for Taupo for six years from 1972 to 1975, and from 1978 to 1981.

He was once asked why there were so few engineers in Parliament, to which he replied: "Because engineers are realists and politicians are idealists." In 1975 his wife Avis unsuccessfully sought the Labour Party candidacy for the Onehunga electorate alongside 26 other aspirants following the retirement of Hugh Watt, but she lost to Frank Rogers.

=== Independent ===
In October 1983 Ridley contested the Labour nomination for the new Tongariro electorate but was unsuccessful, losing to Noel Scott. Ridley disputed the selection process afterwards, claiming that the procedure had been manipulated by the party hierarchy who were determined to select Scott and estimating that he won 250 of the 350 floor votes from the members opposed to less than 20 for Scott. The party president, Jim Anderton, refuted Ridley's claims stating that Labour's selection processes were democratically sound and the decision was final. In the 1984 Ridley stood for the Tongariro electorate as an independent but was not successful. A large proportion of the Tongariro electorate had been part of Taupo. The town of Taupo itself however had become part of Waikaremoana.

== Death ==
Ridley died in Auckland on 23 August 2006. He was survived by his wife and four sons.

== Honours and awards ==
In 1990, Ridley was awarded the New Zealand 1990 Commemoration Medal. In the 1998 Queen's Birthday Honours, he was appointed a Companion of the Queen's Service Order for public services.

== Publications ==
- Ridley, Jack (1989). Towards a South Pacific Federation : the Tasman challenge. Tauranga: Moana Press. ISBN 9780908705573. OCLC 21518871.

== Notes ==
New Zealand Parliament
Preceded by Rona Stevenson	Member of Parliament for Taupo; 1972–1975 1978–1981	Succeeded by Ray La Varis
Preceded by Ray La Varis	Member of Parliament for Taupo; 1972–1975 1978–1981	Succeeded by Roger McClay
