= Candidates in the 2026 New Zealand general election by electorate =

Candidates in the 2026 New Zealand election

New Zealand political candidates in the MMP era
Year	Party list	Candidates
1996	party lists	by electorate
1999	party lists	by electorate
2002	party lists	by electorate
2005	party lists	by electorate
2008	party lists	by electorate
2011	party lists	by electorate
2014	party lists	by electorate
2017	party lists	by electorate
2020	party lists	by electorate
2023	party lists	by electorate
2026	party lists	by electorate

This page lists candidates contesting electorates in the 2026 New Zealand general election.

== General electorates ==
=== Auckland Central ===
2026 general election: Auckland Central
Notes:	Blue background denotes an incumbent. Pink background denotes a current list MP. Yellow background denotes a retiring MP.			
Party	Candidate	Notes	List #	Source
Opportunity	Johan Chang		36	
Labour	Naisi Chen	List MP 2020–2023, contested Botany in 2020 and East Coast Bays in 2023	35	
National	Candace Kinser		55	
Legalise Cannabis	Christopher Manaia		5	
ACT	Antonia Modkova	Contested Panmure-Ōtāhuhu in 2023	13	
Green	Chlöe Swarbrick		2	
Retiring incumbents and withdrawn candidates
Outdoors	Lester Bryant	Announced, but not on final list of candidates		
Independent	Wero Te Kino	Announced, but not on final list of candidates		

=== Banks Peninsula ===
2026 general election: Banks Peninsula
Notes:	Blue background denotes an incumbent. Pink background denotes a current list MP. Yellow background denotes a retiring MP.			
Party	Candidate	Notes	List #	Source
Labour	Tracey McLellan	MP for Banks Peninsula 2020–2023	28	
Green	Craig Pauling		14	
NZ Loyal	Leslie Sales		8	
NZ First	John Stringer	Contested Ilam for the Conservative Party in 2014	47	
Alliance	Kyle Turnbull		5	
Conservative	Amy Turner		8	
National	Vanessa Weenink		39	
ACT	Zachary Wellman		31	
Retiring incumbents and withdrawn candidates
Animal Justice	Rebecca Cleaver	Announced, but not on final list of candidates		
NZ First	Lindsay Kerslake	Contested electorate in 2023		

=== Botany ===
2026 general election: Botany
Notes:	Blue background denotes an incumbent. Pink background denotes a current list MP. Yellow background denotes a retiring MP.			
Party	Candidate	Notes	List #	Source
ACT	Ali Dahche		28	
Labour	Neru Leavasa	MP for Takanini 2020–2023	32	
National	Christopher Luxon		1	
NZ First	Craig Stobo		8	

=== Christchurch Central ===
2026 general election: Christchurch Central
Notes:	Blue background denotes an incumbent. Pink background denotes a current list MP. Yellow background denotes a retiring MP.			
Party	Candidate	Notes	List #	Source
Legalise Cannabis	Blair Anderson	Contested Wigram in 2023	7	
NZ First	Mark Arneil	Contested electorate in 2023	24	
Alliance	Greg Byrnes		13	
Green	Kahurangi Carter	Contested electorate in 2023	11	
Labour	George Hampton	Contested North Shore in 2023	52	
Economic Euthenics	Tubby Hansen	Contested Wigram in 2023		
Independent	Hayden Laurie			
Opportunity	Eden Skipper		5	
National	Dale Stephens	Contested electorate in 2023	23	
Retiring incumbents and withdrawn candidates
ACT	Christian van der Pump	Announced, but not on final list of candidates		
Labour	Duncan Webb			

=== Christchurch East ===
2026 general election: Christchurch East
Notes:	Blue background denotes an incumbent. Pink background denotes a current list MP. Yellow background denotes a retiring MP.			
Party	Candidate	Notes	List #	Source
Green	Teresa Butler	List only candidate for Te Pāti Māori in 2023	55	
Outdoors	David Cajar-Mueller		13	
National	Alexandra Davids		65	
Labour	Reuben Davidson		21	
Alliance	Ethan Gullery		3	
Conservative	Helen Houghton	Contested electorate in 2023; originally selected for Tāmaki	1	
Legalise Cannabis	Paula Lambert	Contested electorate in 2023	4	
ACT	Toni Severin	List MP 2020–2023; contested electorate in 2023	39	
Independent	Vikramjit Singh			
NZ Loyal	Glenn Thompson		17	
NZ First	Shane Wiremu	Contested electorate in 2023	45	

=== Coromandel ===
2026 general election: Coromandel
Notes:	Blue background denotes an incumbent. Pink background denotes a current list MP. Yellow background denotes a retiring MP.			
Party	Candidate	Notes	List #	Source
NZ First	Vincent Anderson		30	
Labour	Glen Bennett	MP for New Plymouth 2020–2023	25	
Outdoors	Ray Cobb	Contested electorate for New Zealand Loyal in 2023	8	
Green	Pamela Grealey	Contested electorate in 2020 and 2023	32	
Independent	Steven Hart			
ACT	Mike McCormick	Contested Papakura in 2023		
National	Scott Simpson		19	

=== Dunedin ===
2026 general election: Dunedin
Notes:	Blue background denotes an incumbent. Pink background denotes a current list MP. Yellow background denotes a retiring MP.			
Party	Candidate	Notes	List #	Source
National	Kristine Asuncion		42	
Opportunity	David Bainbridge-Zafar		8	
Alliance	Victor Billot	Contested Dunedin North in 2011	1	
Labour	Rachel Brooking		11	
Green	Francisco Hernandez	Contested electorate in 2023	10	
Legalise Cannabis	Adrian McDermott	Contested electorate in 2023	10	
NZ First	Kym McDonald-King		26	
Independent	Benedict Ong			

=== East Cape ===
2026 general election: East Cape
Notes:	Blue background denotes an incumbent. Pink background denotes a current list MP. Yellow background denotes a retiring MP.			
Party	Candidate	Notes	List #	Source
Independent	Gordon Dickson	Contested East Coast in 2023		
ACT	Darrin Hawkes		35	
National	Dana Kirkpatrick	MP for East Coast since 2023	33	
Labour	Jo Luxton	MP for Rangitata 2020–2023	17	
Opportunity	Cail Smith		33	
Green	Jordan Walker	Contested East Coast in 2023	45	
Retiring incumbents and withdrawn candidates
NZ First	Te Kira Lawrence	Changed candidacy to Napier		

=== East Coast Bays ===
2026 general election: East Coast Bays
Notes:	Blue background denotes an incumbent. Pink background denotes a current list MP. Yellow background denotes a retiring MP.			
Party	Candidate	Notes	List #	Source
NZ Loyal	Allan Lind		12	
Labour	Brendan McEnroe		69	
Green	Abe McKee		35	
ACT	Sam Mills		22	
National	Erica Stanford		5	
NZ First	Vaughan Taylor		42	

=== Epsom ===
2026 general election: Epsom
Notes:	Blue background denotes an incumbent. Pink background denotes a current list MP. Yellow background denotes a retiring MP.			
Party	Candidate	Notes	List #	Source
Labour	Camilla Belich	Contested electorate in 2023	23	
National	Paul Goldsmith	Contested electorate in 2023	6	
NZ First	Martin Gummer	Contested Waitakere for National in 1981	27	
Opportunity	Paul Jackson		39	
Vision NZ	Sawan Jerry		3	
ACT	David Seymour		1	
Green	Lawrence Xu-Nan	Contested electorate in 2023	8	

=== Glendene ===
2026 general election: Glendene
Notes:	Blue background denotes an incumbent. Pink background denotes a current list MP. Yellow background denotes a retiring MP.			
Party	Candidate	Notes	List #	Source
Opportunity	Evan French		28	
National	Sunil Kumar		63	
Animal Justice	Robert McNeil	Contested Botany in 2023	1	
NZ First	Alfred Ngaro	National list MP, 2011–2020; contested Te Atatū in 2020; NewZeal leader and list only candidate in 2023	5	
ACT	Amanda Roberts		19	
Independent	Tua Schuster			
Labour	Carmel Sepuloni	MP for Kelston since 2014	2	
Green	Yasmine Serhan		18	

=== Hamilton East ===
2026 general election: Hamilton East
Notes:	Blue background denotes an incumbent. Pink background denotes a current list MP. Yellow background denotes a retiring MP.			
Party	Candidate	Notes	List #	Source
Labour	Georgie Dansey	Contested electorate in 2023	33	
Independent	Jacobus Gielen	Contested electorate for The Republic of New Zealand Party in 2023		
National	Ryan Hamilton		36	
NZ First	Nicola Laboyrie		41	
Opportunity	Naomi Pocock	Contested Hamilton West in 2023	15	

=== Hamilton West ===
2026 general election: Hamilton West
Notes:	Blue background denotes an incumbent. Pink background denotes a current list MP. Yellow background denotes a retiring MP.			
Party	Candidate	Notes	List #	Source
New World Order McCann Party	Nathan Lee Couper	Contested Hamilton East in 2023		
Green	Louise Hutt		19	
Independent	Steve Phelps			
Outdoors	Donna Pokere-Phillips	Contested Hauraki-Waikato in 2023	6	
National	Tama Potaka		11	
Opportunity	Blair Smith		35	
NZ First	Kevin Stone	Contested electorate in 2023	43	
Independent	Wiremu Thomson	Contested Wigram in 2023		
Labour	Myra Williamson	Contested electorate in 2023	60	

=== Henderson ===
2026 general election: Henderson
Notes:	Blue background denotes an incumbent. Pink background denotes a current list MP. Yellow background denotes a retiring MP.			
Party	Candidate	Notes	List #	Source
Independent	Kay Luv			
National	Angee Nicholas	Contested Te Atatū in 2023	26	
Jobseeker Party	Kelso Papali'i			
ACT	Nick Peirce		34	
Independent	John Divine Paola Talagi			
Labour	Phil Twyford	MP for Te Atatū since 2011	40	
Green	Alika Wells		27	
NZ First	David Wilson	Contested Upper Harbour in 2023	12	
Opportunity	Almo Wong		37	

=== Hutt South ===
2026 general election: Hutt South
Notes:	Blue background denotes an incumbent. Pink background denotes a current list MP. Yellow background denotes a retiring MP.			
Party	Candidate	Notes	List #	Source
Labour	Ginny Andersen	MP for Hutt South 2020–2023	12	
National	Chris Bishop		3	
NZ First	Alistair Boyce		35	
Independent	Malcolm Dick			
Socialist Equality Group	Tom Petterson			
Independent	David L F Smith			
Green	Courtney White		29	
Opportunity	Benjamin Wylie-van Eerd	Contested electorate in 2023	13	

=== Ilam ===
2026 general election: Ilam
Notes:	Blue background denotes an incumbent. Pink background denotes a current list MP. Yellow background denotes a retiring MP.			
Party	Candidate	Notes	List #	Source
National	Hamish Campbell		48	
Green	Mike Davidson	Contested electorate in 2023	20	
Alliance	Courtney Fraser		9	
ACT	Ken Harpur		44	
Labour	Rata Jamieson		56	
NZ First	Nathan Walton		49	

=== Invercargill ===
2026 general election: Invercargill
Notes:	Blue background denotes an incumbent. Pink background denotes a current list MP. Yellow background denotes a retiring MP.			
Party	Candidate	Notes	List #	Source
Legalise Cannabis	Anntwinette Grumball	Contested Southland in 2023	6	
Green	Dave Kennedy	Contested Southland in 2023	41	
Labour	Janice Lee		61	
Independent	Hayden John Seager			
National	Penny Simmonds		14	

=== Kaikōura ===
2026 general election: Kaikōura
Notes:	Blue background denotes an incumbent. Pink background denotes a current list MP. Yellow background denotes a retiring MP.			
Party	Candidate	Notes	List #	Source
NZ First	Jamie Arbuckle	Contested electorate in 2023	13	
Independent	Iain Britton			
Labour	Matthew Flight	Contested electorate in 2020		
Independent	Oliver Hill Hughes			
Independent	Ted Howard	Contested electorate in 2023		
National	Stuart Smith		21	
ACT	Tom Spooner		24	

=== Kaipara ki Mahurangi ===
2026 general election: Kaipara ki Mahurangi
Notes:	Blue background denotes an incumbent. Pink background denotes a current list MP. Yellow background denotes a retiring MP.			
Party	Candidate	Notes	List #	Source
Green	Zephyr Brown	Contested electorate in 2023	24	
ACT	Simon Court	Contested Te Atatū in 2023	8	
Independent	Mark Dennis			
Outdoors	Liz Dotcom		11	
Opportunity	Daniel Eb		2	
NZ First	Jenny Marcroft	Contested electorate in 2023	10	
National	Jessica Rowe		68	
Labour	Jo Swinburn			
Independent	Ivan Wagstaff			
Retiring incumbents and withdrawn candidates
National	Chris Penk	Was re-selected, but later chose to retire		
Labour	Tracey-Lee Repia	Contested list only for Mana Movement in 2017		

=== Kapiti ===
2026 general election: Kapiti
Notes:	Blue background denotes an incumbent. Pink background denotes a current list MP. Yellow background denotes a retiring MP.			
Party	Candidate	Notes	List #	Source
National	Tim Costley	MP for Ōtaki since 2023	38	
NZ First	Penny Gaylor	Contested Taranaki-King Country for Labour in 2014	19	
Not A Party	Richard Goode	Contested Mana in 2023		
Labour	Sophie Handford		26	
Opportunity	Chee-Khiang Sng		26	
Progressive Aotearoa	Michael Walker	Contested Mana in 2020		
Green	Melody Willis		31	
Retiring incumbents and withdrawn candidates
Green	Asher Wilson-Goldman			

=== Kenepuru ===
2026 general election: Kenepuru
Notes:	Blue background denotes an incumbent. Pink background denotes a current list MP. Yellow background denotes a retiring MP.			
Party	Candidate	Notes	List #	Source
NZ First	Jon Blackshaw		48	
Labour	Barbara Edmonds	MP for Mana since 2020	3	
National	Matthew Evetts	Contested list only in 2014	60	
Opportunity	Robert Mason		20	
Green	Lan Pham	Contested Banks Peninsula in 2023	6	
Not A Party	Bob Wessex	Contested Ōtaki in 2023		
Retiring incumbents and withdrawn candidates
ACT	Lyra Yan Zhang			

=== Māngere ===
2026 general election: Māngere
Notes:	Blue background denotes an incumbent. Pink background denotes a current list MP. Yellow background denotes a retiring MP.			
Party	Candidate	Notes	List #	Source
Outdoors	Hine Afeaki		4	
NZ Loyal	Kelvyn Alp	Contested 2025 Tāmaki Makaurau by-election	1	
National	Rosemary Bourke	Contested electorate in 2023	39	
NZ First	Vicky Hau		21	
Opportunity	Ben Lane		25	
Green	Michel Mulipola		49	
ACT	Manu Singh		26	
Labour	Lemauga Lydia Sosene		41	
People's Party New Zealand	Alani Fisher Taione			
Independent	Timoti Te Moke	Withdrew from Green Party selection		

=== Manurewa ===
2026 general election: Manurewa
Notes:	Blue background denotes an incumbent. Pink background denotes a current list MP. Yellow background denotes a retiring MP.			
Party	Candidate	Notes	List #	Source
National	Ghouse Majeed		66	
Animal Justice	Avalua Tavui		7	
NZ First	Esther Tofilau-Tevaga		18	
Labour	Arena Williams		41	

=== Maungakiekie ===
2026 general election: Maungakiekie
Notes:	Blue background denotes an incumbent. Pink background denotes a current list MP. Yellow background denotes a retiring MP.			
Party	Candidate	Notes	List #	Source
ACT	Juan Alvarez de Lugo	Contested New Lynn in 2023	25	
National	Greg Fleming		44	
NZ First	Keegan Langeveld	Contested Dunedin in 2023	36	
Opportunity	Derrick Paull		23	
Green	Adam Powell		36	
Labour	Priyanca Radhakrishnan	MP for Maungakiekie 2020–2023	18	

=== Mount Albert ===
2026 general election: Mount Albert
Notes:	Blue background denotes an incumbent. Pink background denotes a current list MP. Yellow background denotes a retiring MP.			
Party	Candidate	Notes	List #	Source
Independent	Luke Bones			
NZ First	Sheldon Eden-Whaitiri		32	
National	Melissa Lee	Contested electorate in 2023	29	
Green	Ricardo Menéndez March	Contested electorate in 2023	9	
ACT	Alex Price		14	
Labour	Helen White		37	
Opportunity	Qiulae Wong		1	

=== Mount Maunganui ===
2026 general election: Mount Maunganui
Notes:	Blue background denotes an incumbent. Pink background denotes a current list MP. Yellow background denotes a retiring MP.			
Party	Candidate	Notes	List #	Source
NZ First	Tracey Coxhead		15	
Animal Justice	Caitlin Grattan	Contested Bay of Plenty in 2023	9	
Labour	Rhieve Grey		64	
ACT	Cameron Luxton	Contested Bay of Plenty in 2023	12	
National	Tom Rutherford	MP for Bay of Plenty since 2023	27	
Green	Pualele Westhead		51	
NZ Loyal	Greer Young	Originally selected for Tauranga	6	

=== Mount Roskill ===
2026 general election: Mount Roskill
Notes:	Blue background denotes an incumbent. Pink background denotes a current list MP. Yellow background denotes a retiring MP.			
Party	Candidate	Notes	List #	Source
Opportunity	Jamie Attenborough		29	
National	Carlos Cheung		33	
Animal Justice	Priyanka Deo		6	
Green	Anjana Iyer		38	
ACT	Yang Qu		17	
Labour	Michael Wood	MP for Mount Roskill 2016–2023	none	

=== Napier ===
2026 general election: Napier
Notes:	Blue background denotes an incumbent. Pink background denotes a current list MP. Yellow background denotes a retiring MP.			
Party	Candidate	Notes	List #	Source
Green	Roy Boonen		52	
Labour	Alex Hedley		49	
NZ First	Te Kira Lawrence	Originally selected for East Cape	28	
National	Katie Nimon		26	
ACT	John Ormond		40	
Independent	Graham Wainwright			
Retiring incumbents and withdrawn candidates
NZ First	Stuart Nash	Labour MP for Napier 2014–2023		

=== Nelson ===
2026 general election: Nelson
Notes:	Blue background denotes an incumbent. Pink background denotes a current list MP. Yellow background denotes a retiring MP.			
Party	Candidate	Notes	List #	Source
ACT	Chris Baillie	List MP 2020–2023; contested electorate in 2023	46	
Labour	Rachel Boyack		37	
National	Blair Cameron	Contested electorate in 2023	41	
NZ Loyal	Julian Crawford	Contested Dunedin South for the Aotearoa Legalise Cannabis Party in 2014	7	
Progressive Aotearoa	Bruce Dyer	Contested electorate in 2023		
Opportunity	Jodie Kuntzsch		6	
Green	Rohan O'Neill-Stevens		16	

=== New Plymouth ===
2026 general election: New Plymouth
Notes:	Blue background denotes an incumbent. Pink background denotes a current list MP. Yellow background denotes a retiring MP.			
Party	Candidate	Notes	List #	Source
Labour	Amanda Clinton-Gohdes		59	
Independent Taranaki	Rusty Kane	Contested electorate in 2020		
Opportunity	Sarah Lucas		7	
National	David MacLeod		46	

=== North Shore ===
2026 general election: North Shore
Notes:	Blue background denotes an incumbent. Pink background denotes a current list MP. Yellow background denotes a retiring MP.			
Party	Candidate	Notes	List #	Source
ACT	Karen Chhour	Contested Upper Harbour in 2023	5	
Labour	Sam Collins		63	
Green	Josh Jacobsen		25	
Opportunity	Holly Knill		9	
National	Simon Watts		13	
Retiring incumbents and withdrawn candidates
Conservative	Marie Drury	Changed candidacy to Northcote	5	

=== Northcote ===
2026 general election: Northcote
Notes:	Blue background denotes an incumbent. Pink background denotes a current list MP. Yellow background denotes a retiring MP.			
Party	Candidate	Notes	List #	Source
National	Dan Bidois		31	
Animal Justice	Lily Carrington	Contested Hamilton East in 2023	3	
Conservative	Marie Drury	Originally selected for North Shore	5	
NZ Loyal	Barak Ford		16	
Green	Bhen Goodsir		17	
NZ First	Daryl Habraken		29	
Labour	Shanan Halbert	MP for Northcote 2020–2023	19	
ACT	Martin Lundqvist		42	
Opportunity	Cody Marsh		17	

=== Northland ===
2026 general election: Northland
Notes:	Blue background denotes an incumbent. Pink background denotes a current list MP. Yellow background denotes a retiring MP.			
Party	Candidate	Notes	List #	Source
ACT	Mark Cameron	Contested electorate in 2023. Withdrew from ACT's list due to ill health but remained ACT's Northland candidate.		
Green	Mike Finlayson	Contested electorate for Northland Party in 2023	48	
NZ First	Shane Jones	Contested electorate in 2023	2	
Labour	Ashleigh Latimer		55	
Legalise Cannabis	Jeff Lye	Contested electorate in 2023	3	
Conservative	Doug Lyell		4	
National	Grant McCallum		35	
Build the Nation	Richard McIntosh			
NZ Loyal	Pete Verhoeven		10	
Outdoors	Alistair Wait		5	
Retiring incumbents and withdrawn candidates
Outdoors	Sean Brickland			
Green	Lucian Plaumann			

=== Ōtāhuhu ===
2026 general election: Ōtāhuhu
Notes:	Blue background denotes an incumbent. Pink background denotes a current list MP. Yellow background denotes a retiring MP.			
Party	Candidate	Notes	List #	Source
NZ Loyal	John Alcock	Contested Pakuranga for Rock The Vote NZ in 2023	9	
National	Lalit Arya		58	
ACT	Henrietta Devoe		21	
Independent	Phillip Harry Faleu			
People's Party New Zealand	Eseta Haunga			
Opportunity	Adam MacRae-Martin		18	
Vision NZ	Karl Mokaraka	Contested Panmure-Ōtāhuhu in 2023	4	
Independent	James Robb	Contested Panmure-Ōtāhuhu for Workers Now in 2023		
Labour	Jenny Salesa	MP for Panmure-Ōtāhuhu since 2020	24	
Green	Te Whatanui Skipwith		30	

=== Pakuranga ===
2026 general election: Pakuranga
Notes:	Blue background denotes an incumbent. Pink background denotes a current list MP. Yellow background denotes a retiring MP.			
Party	Candidate	Notes	List #	Source
National	Simeon Brown		4	
Opportunity	Kevin Huang		40	
Labour	Campbell Matthews		70	
ACT	Parmjeet Parmar	Contested electorate in 2023	10	
Retiring incumbents and withdrawn candidates
NZ First	Catherine Somerville-Ryan			

=== Palmerston North ===
2026 general election: Palmerston North
Notes:	Blue background denotes an incumbent. Pink background denotes a current list MP. Yellow background denotes a retiring MP.			
Party	Candidate	Notes	List #	Source
Animal Justice	Brian Baker		5	
National	Ankit Bansal	Contested electorate in 2023	53	
Opportunity	Netra Ghimire		32	
Alliance	Joshua Moss		11	
Green	Teanau Tuiono	Contested electorate in 2023	3	
Labour	Tangi Utikere		14	
Retiring incumbents and withdrawn candidates
ACT	Bruce McGechan	Contested New Plymouth in 2023		
NZ First	Helma Vermuelen	Contested Rangitīkei in 2023		

=== Papakura ===
2026 general election: Papakura
Notes:	Blue background denotes an incumbent. Pink background denotes a current list MP. Yellow background denotes a retiring MP.			
Party	Candidate	Notes	List #	Source
National	Emma Chatterton	Contested Remutaka in 2023	52	
Green	Angela Dalton		26	
Labour	Anahila Kanongata'a	List MP 2017–2023; contested electorate in 2023	48	
ACT	Malkiat Singh		29	
Vision NZ	Hannah Tamaki	Contested Tāmaki Makaurau in 2023 and also contested the 2025 Tāmaki Makaurau by-election	1	
Retiring incumbents and withdrawn candidates
National	Judith Collins			
NZ First	George Ngatai	Contested Takanini for Vision NZ in 2020		

=== Port Waikato ===
2026 general election: Port Waikato
Notes:	Blue background denotes an incumbent. Pink background denotes a current list MP. Yellow background denotes a retiring MP.			
Party	Candidate	Notes	List #	Source
Labour	Matt Brachi			
NZ First	Casey Costello	Contested electorate in 2023 and contested 2023 Port Waikato by-election	3	
ACT	Sarah Jane Lochead-Macmillan		43	
Green	Carl Morgan		28	
National	Matthew Paul		62	
Retiring incumbents and withdrawn candidates
National	Andrew Bayly			
Outdoors	Daymond Goulder-Horobin	Later announced to be contesting list only	14	

=== Rangitata ===
2026 general election: Rangitata
Notes:	Blue background denotes an incumbent. Pink background denotes a current list MP. Yellow background denotes a retiring MP.			
Party	Candidate	Notes	List #	Source
ACT	Aaron Allred		37	
Opportunity	Matt Harris		30	
Labour	Sange Malama		64	
Outdoors	Kevin McCraken		15	
National	James Meager		18	
NZ First	Isaac Nicholson		38	
Green	Dave Richards		42	
Conservative	Karl Thomas	Contested electorate in 2023	2	

=== Rangitīkei ===
2026 general election: Rangitīkei
Notes:	Blue background denotes an incumbent. Pink background denotes a current list MP. Yellow background denotes a retiring MP.			
Party	Candidate	Notes	List #	Source
Outdoors	Cedric Backhouse	Withdrew as New Conservative candidate for this electorate in 2020	12	
NZ First	Steve Gibson		33	
ACT	Andrew Hoggard	Contested electorate in 2023	3	
Green	Bernard Long	Contested electorate in 2023	39	
National	Suze Redmayne		32	
Labour	Karl Severinsen		66	
NZ Loyal	Jason Smith		14	
Retiring incumbents and withdrawn candidates
Alliance	Kevin Campbell	List MP 1999–2002; contested Wigram in 2011		

=== Remutaka ===
2026 general election: Remutaka
Notes:	Blue background denotes an incumbent. Pink background denotes a current list MP. Yellow background denotes a retiring MP.			
Party	Candidate	Notes	List #	Source
Independent	Victor Edward Dench			
ACT	Nigel Elder		23	
NZ First	Andy Foster	Contested Mana in 2023	11	
Labour	Chris Hipkins		1	
National	Zabeen Lateef		67	
Green	Chris Norton	Contested electorate in 2023	34	
Opportunity	Luke Ross		21	

=== Rotorua ===
2026 general election: Rotorua
Notes:	Blue background denotes an incumbent. Pink background denotes a current list MP. Yellow background denotes a retiring MP.			
Party	Candidate	Notes	List #	Source
NZ First	Billy Brown		34	
Opportunity	Finn Liley		27	
National	Todd McClay		10	
Labour	Fisher Wang		68	

=== Selwyn ===
2026 general election: Selwyn
Notes:	Blue background denotes an incumbent. Pink background denotes a current list MP. Yellow background denotes a retiring MP.			
Party	Candidate	Notes	List #	Source
Green	Alma de Anda		33	
Labour	Sunita Gautam			
National	Nicola Grigg		17	
Alliance	Jesse Luke		10	
Opportunity	Adrian Mee		38	
NZ First	Elizabeth Mundt		46	
ACT	Iain Murray		11	
Independent	Zoran Rakovic			
Retiring incumbents and withdrawn candidates
Labour	Nick Moody			

=== Southland ===
2026 general election: Southland
Notes:	Blue background denotes an incumbent. Pink background denotes a current list MP. Yellow background denotes a retiring MP.			
Party	Candidate	Notes	List #	Source
Opportunity	Bianca Beebe		11	
NZ First	Jason Herrick		17	
Vision NZ	Naomi Maclean	Contested electorate in 2023	5	
Labour	Peter McDonald		58	
National	Joseph Mooney		50	
ACT	Todd Stephenson	Contested electorate in 2023	6	

=== Taieri ===
2026 general election: Taieri
Notes:	Blue background denotes an incumbent. Pink background denotes a current list MP. Yellow background denotes a retiring MP.			
Party	Candidate	Notes	List #	Source
ACT	Robbie Byars		32	
National	Matthew French	Contested electorate in 2023	54	
Alliance	Anna Knight		2	
Labour	Ingrid Leary		39	
NZ First	Mark Patterson	Contested electorate in 2023	4	
Green	Scott Willis	Contested electorate in 2023	15	
Retiring incumbents and withdrawn candidates
Opportunity	Mathew Phillips	Resigned from party		

=== Takanini ===
2026 general election: Takanini
Notes:	Blue background denotes an incumbent. Pink background denotes a current list MP. Yellow background denotes a retiring MP.			
Party	Candidate	Notes	List #	Source
NZ First	Elliot Ikilei	Contested electorate for New Conservatives in 2020	20	
National	Rima Nakhle		45	
Labour	Kharag Singh	Contested Botany in 2023	61	
NZ Loyal	Paul Teio	Contested Māngere for the Direct Democracy Party of New Zealand in 2005	2	
Animal Justice	Lynley Tulloch	Contested electorate in 2023	8	

=== Tāmaki ===
2026 general election: Tāmaki
Notes:	Blue background denotes an incumbent. Pink background denotes a current list MP. Yellow background denotes a retiring MP.			
Party	Candidate	Notes	List #	Source
ACT	James Christmas	Contested the list only for National in 2023	7	
Labour	Max Harris		29	
Opportunity	Sacha Haskell		31	
Green	Donald Mackenzie-Mayo		43	
National	Mahesh Muralidhar	Contested Auckland Central in 2023	23	
Independent	Ryan Earl Pausina			
Independent	Finlay Smith			
Retiring incumbents and withdrawn candidates
Conservative	Helen Houghton	Changed candidacy to Christchurch East	1	
NZ First	John Ryan		none	
ACT	Brooke van Velden			

=== Taranaki-King Country ===
2026 general election: Taranaki-King Country
Notes:	Blue background denotes an incumbent. Pink background denotes a current list MP. Yellow background denotes a retiring MP.			
Party	Candidate	Notes	List #	Source
ACT	Ivana Jovicic			
National	Barbara Kuriger		43	
Green	Phil McCabe	Contested Hunua in 2017	50	
Labour	David Pattemore		71	
NZ First	Lee Smith	Withdrew as DemocracyNZ candidate for this electorate in 2023, contested electorate for New Conservatives in 2020	25	

=== Taupō ===
2026 general election: Taupō
Notes:	Blue background denotes an incumbent. Pink background denotes a current list MP. Yellow background denotes a retiring MP.			
Party	Candidate	Notes	List #	Source
Labour	Chris Flatt		20	
Green	Celine Kearney		none	
Independent	Itania Nikolao			
Opportunity	Sam Plummer		34	
National	Louise Upston		7	
NZ Loyal	Gordon Wilson	Contested electorate in 2023	13	

=== Tauranga ===
2026 general election: Tauranga
Notes:	Blue background denotes an incumbent. Pink background denotes a current list MP. Yellow background denotes a retiring MP.			
Party	Candidate	Notes	List #	Source
Opportunity	Michael Carter		22	
Animal Justice	Sam Connely		10	
Independent	Tim Maltby			
ACT	Bryan Norton		41	
Green	Daniël Oosthuizen		40	
Labour	Jan Tinetti	Contested electorate in 2023	15	
National	Sam Uffindell		51	
Retiring incumbents and withdrawn candidates
Outdoors	Wendy Gillespie	Contested Bay of Plenty for the Leighton Baker Party in 2023; Announced, but not on final list of candidates		
NZ Loyal	Greer Young	Changed candidacy to Mount Maunganui	6	

=== Tukituki ===
2026 general election: Tukituki
Notes:	Blue background denotes an incumbent. Pink background denotes a current list MP. Yellow background denotes a retiring MP.			
Party	Candidate	Notes	List #	Source
ACT	Rob Douglas	Contested electorate in 2023		
Green	Mark Longworth		47	
Legalise Cannabis	Romana Marnz Manning	Contested electorate in 2023	9	
NZ First	Taine Randell		9	
Labour	Dan Scott			
Independent	Grant Seton			
Independent	Allister Tosh	Contested electorate for Future Youth in 2023		
Opportunity	Rachel Ward		14	
National	Catherine Wedd		36	
Retiring incumbents and withdrawn candidates
Independent	Kaleb Hawkins			

=== Upper Harbour ===
2026 general election: Upper Harbour
Notes:	Blue background denotes an incumbent. Pink background denotes a current list MP. Yellow background denotes a retiring MP.			
Party	Candidate	Notes	List #	Source
Labour	Hannah Pia Baral	Contested Waitakere for United Future in 2005	44	
National	Cameron Brewer		20	
Independent	Jonathon Griffiths			
ACT	Panos Patros		36	
Green	Ryan Richards		53	
NZ First	Bernadette Soares	Contested electorate for Vision NZ in 2023	22	
Opportunity	Romeo Tevaga		12	

=== Waikato ===
2026 general election: Waikato
Notes:	Blue background denotes an incumbent. Pink background denotes a current list MP. Yellow background denotes a retiring MP.			
Party	Candidate	Notes	List #	Source
NZ First	Robbie Cookson		23	
ACT	Ash Parmar	Contested Hamilton East in 2023	16	
Independent	Turi Te Kamonga Robinson			
Labour	Jamie Toko	Contested electorate in 2023		
National	Tim van de Molen		48	
Independent	Brendan Richard Whyte			
Retiring incumbents and withdrawn candidates
Independent	Walt Cavendish	Announced, but not on final list of candidates		

=== Waimakariri ===
2026 general election: Waimakariri
Notes:	Blue background denotes an incumbent. Pink background denotes a current list MP. Yellow background denotes a retiring MP.			
Party	Candidate	Notes	List #	Source
ACT	Ashley Bettridge		30	
National	Matt Doocey		12	
NZ First	Jackie Farrelly	Contested West Coast-Tasman in 2023	44	
Labour	Dan Rosewarne	Also list MP 2022–2023. Contested electorate in 2020 and 2023	35	
Green	Richard Wesley	Contested Wigram in 2023	54	
Retiring incumbents and withdrawn candidates
Conservative	Steve Chick	Announced, but not on final list of candidates		
Alliance	Ali McDougall			

=== Wairarapa ===
2026 general election: Wairarapa
Notes:	Blue background denotes an incumbent. Pink background denotes a current list MP. Yellow background denotes a retiring MP.			
Party	Candidate	Notes	List #	Source
Alliance	Victoria Ale		6	
National	Mike Butterick		20	
Green	Lauren Craig		23	
Te Pāti Hira	Jared Gardner	Contested electorate as an independent in 2023		
NZ First	Ron Mark	List MP 1996–2008, 2014–2020. Contested electorate in 2020	16	
Labour	Kieran McAnulty	MP for Wairarapa 2020–2023	10	
Opportunity	Matt Shepherd		24	
Outdoors	Barry Young	Originally selected for Wellington North	3	

=== Waitākere ===
2026 general election: Waitākere
Notes:	Blue background denotes an incumbent. Pink background denotes a current list MP. Yellow background denotes a retiring MP.			
Party	Candidate	Notes	List #	Source
Green	Steve Abel	Contested New Lynn in 2023	12	
National	Agnes Loheni	List MP 2019–2020; contested Māngere in 2020	57	
Independent	Bianca O'Keefe			
Opportunity	Mark Roach		19	
ACT	Callum Sheridan		20	
Labour	Vanushi Walters	MP for Upper Harbour 2020–2023	8	
Retiring incumbents and withdrawn candidates
National	Paulo Garcia	MP for New Lynn since 2023		

=== Waitaki ===
2026 general election: Waitaki
Notes:	Blue background denotes an incumbent. Pink background denotes a current list MP. Yellow background denotes a retiring MP.			
Party	Candidate	Notes	List #	Source
National	Miles Anderson		46	
ACT	Sean Beamish	Contested electorate in 2023	45	
Independent	Adrian Daegal Graamans			
Independent	Bronwyn Judge			
NZ First	Michael Laws	MP for Hawke's Bay 1990–1996	6	
Labour	Damien O'Connor	MP since 1993; previously represented West Coast-Tasman	16	
Independent	Daniel Shand	Contested electorate in 2023		
Opportunity	Helen Tait		16	

=== Wellington Bays ===
2026 general election: Wellington Bays
Notes:	Blue background denotes an incumbent. Pink background denotes a current list MP. Yellow background denotes a retiring MP.			
Party	Candidate	Notes	List #	Source
Money Free Party	Liam Anderson			
Green	Julie Anne Genter	MP for Rongotai since 2023	5	
Opportunity	Kayla Kingdon-Bebb		4	
Independent	Donald DS McDonald	Contested Rongotai in 2023		
ACT	Nicole McKee	Contested Rongotai in 2023	2	
National	Karunā Muthu	Contested Rongotai in 2023	63	
Labour	Craig Renney		50	
NZ First	Gerald Warner		39	
Independent	Bruce Welsh	Contested Rongotai for New Conservatives in 2023		
Retiring incumbents and withdrawn candidates
Outdoors	Alison Pavlovich	Later announced to be contesting list only	7	

=== Wellington North ===
2026 general election: Wellington North
Notes:	Blue background denotes an incumbent. Pink background denotes a current list MP. Yellow background denotes a retiring MP.			
Party	Candidate	Notes	List #	Source
Legalise Cannabis	Michael Appleby	Contested Wellington Central in 2023	2	
NZ First	Taylor Arneil	Contested Wellington Central in 2023	40	
ACT	Matthew Hague		33	
Opportunity	Jessica Hammond	Contested Ōhāriu in 2023	3	
Alliance	Josh Harford		8	
Green	Tamatha Paul	MP for Wellington Central since 2023	4	
National	Jonathan Pitts		67	
Labour	Ayesha Verrall		6	
Retiring incumbents and withdrawn candidates
Outdoors	Barry Young	Changed candidacy to Wairarapa	3	

=== West Coast-Tasman ===
2026 general election: West Coast-Tasman
Notes:	Blue background denotes an incumbent. Pink background denotes a current list MP. Yellow background denotes a retiring MP.			
Party	Candidate	Notes	List #	Source
Green	Andrew Beaumont		37	
NZ First	Jamie Cleine		14	
Alliance	Sara Dyatlova–Murphy		4	
Outdoors	Sue Grey	Contested electorate in 2023	1	
NZ Loyal	Alex Hislop		4	
ACT	Janelle Hocking	Contested the list only for National in 2023	15	
National	Katie Milne		24	
Money Free Party	Richard Osmaston	Contested electorate in 2023		
Labour	Rory Paterson		53	
Progressive Aotearoa	Kevin Rooke			
Opportunity	Cindie Uddstrom			
Retiring incumbents and withdrawn candidates
Alliance	Louis Coup			
National	Maureen Pugh			

=== Whanganui ===
2026 general election: Whanganui
Notes:	Blue background denotes an incumbent. Pink background denotes a current list MP. Yellow background denotes a retiring MP.			
Party	Candidate	Notes	List #	Source
National	Carl Bates		29	
Balance New Zealand	Juan Charles Coffey			
NZ First	Harete Hipango-Brownlie	National MP for Whanganui 2017–2020	7	
Animal Justice	Sandra Kyle	Contested electorate in 2023	4	
Labour	Angela Roberts	List MP 2020–2023; contested Taranaki-King Country in 2023	46	
Retiring incumbents and withdrawn candidates
Green	Awhi Haenga		31	

=== Whangaparāoa ===
2026 general election: Whangaparāoa
Notes:	Blue background denotes an incumbent. Pink background denotes a current list MP. Yellow background denotes a retiring MP.			
Party	Candidate	Notes	List #	Source
NZ Loyal	Brenton Faithfull	Withdrew from Kaipara ki Mahurangi in 2023	3	
National	Mark Mitchell		8	
Labour	Estefania Muller-Pallarès	Contested electorate in 2023	47	
ACT	Helena Roza		27	

=== Whangārei ===
2026 general election: Whangārei
Notes:	Blue background denotes an incumbent. Pink background denotes a current list MP. Yellow background denotes a retiring MP.			
Party	Candidate	Notes	List #	Source
Money Free Party	Luke Beharrell	Announced for but did not contest Auckland Central in 2023		
NZ Loyal	Collin Blackman		11	
National	Lloyd Budd		60	
Independent	Daryl Warren Clotworthy			
NZ First	Vince Cocurullo		31	
Opportunity	Simon DellaBarca			
ACT	Doug Graham		38	
Labour	Gary Payinda		48	
Independent	Jon Twyman			
Outdoors	Noah Wakelam		17	
Retiring incumbents and withdrawn candidates
National	Shane Reti			

=== Wigram ===
2026 general election: Wigram
Notes:	Blue background denotes an incumbent. Pink background denotes a current list MP. Yellow background denotes a retiring MP.			
Party	Candidate	Notes	List #	Source
Free Palestine	William Donald Alexander		5	
ACT	Laura McClure	Contested Banks Peninsula in 2023	9	
Independent	Geoff McTague	Contested electorate in 2023		
Green	Shreejan Pandey		22	
NZ First	Bryce Park		37	
National	Tracy Summerfield	Contested electorate in 2023	56	
Labour	Dominik Yanzick		52	
Retiring incumbents and withdrawn candidates
Alliance	Nicolas Pegg			
Labour	Megan Woods	Contesting list only		

== Māori electorates ==
=== Hauraki-Waikato ===
2026 general election: Hauraki-Waikato
Notes:	Blue background denotes an incumbent. Pink background denotes a current list MP. Yellow background denotes a retiring MP.			
Party	Candidate	Notes	List #	Source
Independent	Neil Denby			
Labour	Kingi Kiriona		22	
Te Pāti Māori	Hana-Rawhiti Maipi-Clarke		none	

=== Ikaroa-Rāwhiti ===
2026 general election: Ikaroa-Rāwhiti
Notes:	Blue background denotes an incumbent. Pink background denotes a current list MP. Yellow background denotes a retiring MP.			
Party	Candidate	Notes	List #	Source
Te Pāti Māori	Haley Maxwell		none	
Labour	Cushla Tangaere-Manuel		9	
Green	Heather Te Au-Skipworth	Withdrew as Te Pāti Māori candidate for this electorate and Tukituki in 2023	21	

=== Tāmaki Makaurau ===
2026 general election: Tāmaki Makaurau
Notes:	Blue background denotes an incumbent. Pink background denotes a current list MP. Yellow background denotes a retiring MP.			
Party	Candidate	Notes	List #	Source
Te Pāti Māori	Oriini Kaipara		none	
Independent	Kerrin Leoni	Contested Waikato in 2020. Resigned from Labour after 2026 nominations closed. Has promised to sit as an independent MP if elected, but remains on the ballot as a Labour candidate and on the Labour list.	42 (Note: Remains on the Labour Party list despite resigning.)	
Green	Florence Te Ohaere		44	

=== Te Tai Hauāuru ===
2026 general election: Te Tai Hauāuru
Notes:	Blue background denotes an incumbent. Pink background denotes a current list MP. Yellow background denotes a retiring MP.			
Party	Candidate	Notes	List #	Source
Labour	Te Pūoho Kātene		34	
Te Pāti Māori	Debbie Ngarewa-Packer		none	
National	Coral Raukawa		56	

=== Te Tai Tokerau ===
2026 general election: Te Tai Tokerau
Notes:	Blue background denotes an incumbent. Pink background denotes a current list MP. Yellow background denotes a retiring MP.			
Party	Candidate	Notes	List #	Source
Your PIC Party	Karl Barkley			
Te Pāti Māori	Aperahama Edwards		none	
Legalise Cannabis	Maki Herbert	Contested electorate in 2023	1	
Te Tai Tokerau	Mariameno Kapa-Kingi	Elected as Te Pāti Māori MP in 2023	2	
Green	Hūhana Lyndon	Contested electorate in 2023	7	
Labour	Willow-Jean Prime	MP for Northland 2020–2023	7	

=== Te Tai Tonga ===
2026 general election: Te Tai Tonga
Notes:	Blue background denotes an incumbent. Pink background denotes a current list MP. Yellow background denotes a retiring MP.			
Party	Candidate	Notes	List #	Source
Independent	Tākuta Ferris	Elected as Te Pāti Māori MP in 2023		
NZ Loyal	Christine Fisher		15	
Legalise Cannabis	Tania Henare		8	
Te Pāti Māori	Lisa Marie Murch		none	
Labour	Mananui Ramsden		none	
Green	Lisa Te Morenga		46	

=== Waiariki ===
2026 general election: Waiariki
Notes:	Blue background denotes an incumbent. Pink background denotes a current list MP. Yellow background denotes a retiring MP.			
Party	Candidate	Notes	List #	Source
Labour	Toni Boynton	Contested electorate in 2023	44	
Green	Tania Waikato		13	
Te Pāti Māori	Rawiri Waititi		none	
Opportunity	Pāpā Wharewera		10	
