= Ron Peters =

Ron Peters may refer to:

- Ron Peters (New Zealand politician), brother of politicians
- Ron Peters, member of the Oklahoma House of Representatives
