= Ian Peters =

New Zealand politician (born 1941)

Member of the New Zealand Parliament for Tongariro
- In office 1990–1993
- Preceded by: Noel Scott
- Succeeded by: Mark Burton

Personal details
- Born: 1941 (age 84–85)
- Party: National; New Zealand First
- Relatives: Jim Peters (brother); Lynette Stewart (sister); Winston Peters (brother); Bree Peters (niece)

Ian Peters (born 1941) is a former New Zealand politician. He represented the Tongariro electorate with the National Party from 1990 until 1993. In 1993 he defected to the newly formed New Zealand First party with his brother Winston Peters, but was not re-elected in that year's general election.

== Personal life ==
Peters was born in Kawakawa in 1941. He is a brother of NZ First MP, leader and minister, Winston Peters, and former NZ First MP Jim Peters.

Another brother, Ron Peters, stood for New Zealand First in Hobson in 1993, coming third; and for Northland in 1996, coming second.

== Member of Parliament ==
New Zealand Parliament
Years	Term	Electorate	Party
1990–1993	43rd	Tongariro	National

He represented the Tongariro electorate in Parliament from 1990 to 1993, when he was defeated by Mark Burton. He stood unsuccessfully against Burton for Tongariro's replacement seat of Taupo in 1996, for the New Zealand First party.

Since leaving politics, he has been a senior staffer at Te Puni Kōkiri in Whangarei.

New Zealand Parliament
Preceded by Noel Scott	Member of Parliament for Tongariro; 1990–1993	Succeeded by Mark Burton
