= Taupō (electorate) =

- Single-member general constituency for the New Zealand House of Representatives
- Interactive map of boundaries from the 2026 election
- Formation: 1963
- Region: Waikato; Manawatū-Whanganui; Hawke's Bay; Bay of Plenty
- Character: Urban, rural
- Term: 3 years

Member for Taupō
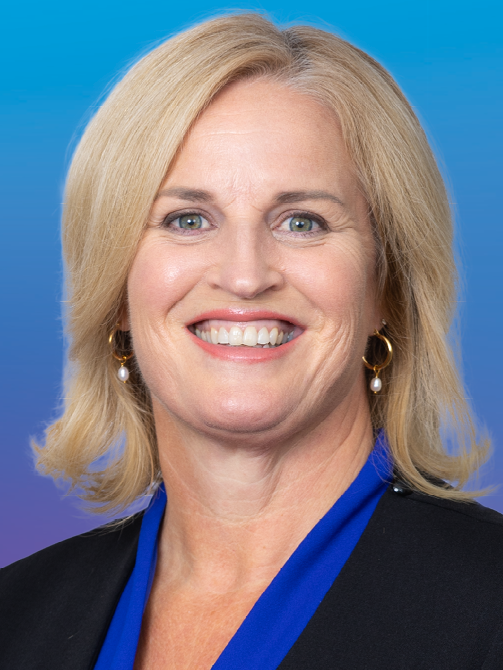
- Louise Upston since 8 November 2008
- Party: National
- Previous MP: Mark Burton (Labour)
Party vote distribution

Taupō (spelt as Taupo until 2008) is a New Zealand parliamentary electorate returning one Member of Parliament to the House of Representatives. Taupo first existed between 1963 and 1981, and was recreated for the introduction of MMP in 1996. The current MP for Taupō is Louise Upston of the National Party. She has held this position since 2008.

== Electorate profile ==
The Taupō electorate is based on the central North Island communities around Lake Taupō and the South Waikato District, including Tūrangi, Taupō, Tokoroa, Tīrau, Putāruru and Cambridge.

Map of boundaries at the 2020 and 2023 general elections

In the 2007 redistribution conducted after the 2006 census, the northern and western parts of Ruapehu District containing Taumarunui, Raetihi and Ohakune were assigned to Rangitīkei. At the same time, low population growth in the south-central North Island coupled with high population growth in and around Auckland has meant the conservative area of Cambridge moved out of the now defunct Piako electorate and into Taupō. No boundary adjustments were undertaken in the subsequent 2013/14 redistribution. In the 2020 redistribution, an area around Putāruru and Tīrau, and a smaller area just north of Cambridge were ceded to Waikato. No boundary adjustments were undertaken in the subsequent 2025 redistribution.

In 2013, one quarter (24.9%) of people in the Taupō electorate belonged to the Māori ethnic group – the sixth-highest share in New Zealand. The proportions of those working in the electricity, gas, water and waste services industry (1.3%), the accommodation, cafe, and restaurant industry (7.5%), and in arts and recreation services (2.4%), were well above the national average.

== History ==
The Taupo electorate was first created for the 1963 election and it existed until 1981. The former electorate was much smaller than the current one, since it did not contain the western side of Lake Taupo, nor Cambridge, nor the Ruapehu towns. It was a marginal seat and frequently changed between National and Labour.

The current Taupō electorate was created ahead of the introduction to mixed-member proportional (MMP) voting in 1996. It is a merger of the old marginal seat of Tongariro with the western half of the safe National seat of Waikaremoana. Prior to the 2008 election, the electorate pulled south to take in the northern and western parts of Ruapehu District.

Taupō has twice returned Mark Burton with a majority of around a thousand – in 1996, when Labour's post-1990 fortunes were at their lowest and New Zealand First went on to take a large bite out of their vote; and again in 2005, when National consolidated the centre-right vote, and at the same time won 2,000 more party votes than Burton's Labour party. At the intermediate two MMP elections, Burton was safely returned, thanks in part to a heavy disenchantment with the National Party among its formerly loyal voters. In the political climate in 2008, with the dominance of the National Party in Cambridge, which contributed over ten thousand new voters to the seat, Louise Upston won the seat with a majority of over 6,000. In the 2011 election, Upston more than doubled her majority to 14,115 votes. Her majority increased to 15,046 votes in the 2014 election.

== Members of Parliament ==
Unless otherwise stated, all MPs' terms began and ended at general elections.

Key National Labour

Election	Winner
1963 election	Rona Stevenson
1966 election	Rona Stevenson
1969 election	Rona Stevenson
1972 election	Jack Ridley
1975 election	Ray La Varis
1978 election	Jack Ridley
1981 election	Roger McClay
(Electorate abolished 1984–1996; see Tongariro and Waikaremoana)
1996 election	Mark Burton
1999 election	Mark Burton
2002 election	Mark Burton
2005 election	Mark Burton
2008 election	Louise Upston
2011 election	Louise Upston
2014 election	Louise Upston
2017 election	Louise Upston
2020 election	Louise Upston
2023 election	Louise Upston

As of 2023 no candidates that have contested the Taupō electorate have been returned as list MPs.

== Election results ==
=== 2026 election ===
The next election will be held on 7 November 2026. Candidates for Taupō are listed at Candidates in the 2026 New Zealand general election by electorate § Taupō. Official results will be available after 27 November 2026.

=== 2023 election ===
2023 general election: Taupō
Notes:	Blue background denotes the winner of the electorate vote. Pink background denotes a candidate elected from their party list. Yellow background denotes an electorate win by a list member, or other incumbent. A ✓ or ✗ denotes status of any incumbent, win or lose respectively.						
Party	Candidate	Votes	%	±%	Party votes	%	±%
National	✓ Louise Upston	24,858	57.13	+8.23	19,966	45.34	+12.59
Labour	Ala' Al-Bustanji	8,353	19.20	–17.84	9,686	21.99	–23.28
Green	George Patena	3,441	7.90	+3.22	2,773	6.29	+2.49
ACT	Zane Cozens	2,808	6.45	+2.17	4,960	11.26	+1.43
NZ First	Tira Pehi	2,114	4.85	–	3,508	7.96	+5.18
NZ Loyal	Gordon Wilson	1,410	3.24	–	961	2.18	–
Opportunities					644	1.46	+0.12
Te Pāti Māori					567	1.28	+0.85
NewZeal					208	0.47	+0.05
Legalise Cannabis					178	0.40	+0.03
Freedoms NZ					134	0.30	–
DemocracyNZ					75	0.17	–
New Conservatives					66	0.14	+1.40
Animal Justice					50	0.11	–
Leighton Baker Party					36	0.08	–
Women's Rights					26	0.05	–
New Nation					20	0.04	–
Informal votes		520			170		
Total valid votes		43,504			44,028		
National hold	Majority	16,505	37.93	+26.32			

=== 2020 election ===
2020 general election: Taupō
Notes:	Blue background denotes the winner of the electorate vote. Pink background denotes a candidate elected from their party list. Yellow background denotes an electorate win by a list member, or other incumbent. A ✓ or ✗ denotes status of any incumbent, win or lose respectively.						
Party	Candidate	Votes	%	±%	Party votes	%	±%
National	✓ Louise Upston	21,102	48.90	−13.98	14,452	32.75	−21.19
Labour	Ala' Al-Bustanji	15,983	37.04	+10.79	19,978	45.27	+16.29
Green	Danna Glendining	2,018	4.68	−3.29	1,677	3.80	+0.36
ACT	David Freeman	1,848	4.28	–	4,340	9.83	+9.35
Outdoors	Michael Downard	645	1.49	−0.59	123	0.28	+0.11
New Conservative	Jan-Marie Quinn	608	1.41	—	681	1.54	+1.27
Advance NZ	Antoinette James	531	1.23	—	476	1.08	—
ONE	Gary Coffin	415	0.96	—	184	0.42	—
NZ First					1,227	2.78	−6.24
Opportunities					592	1.34	−0.94
ONE					184	0.42	–
Legalise Cannabis					165	0.37	+0.07
Māori Party					195	0.43	−0.28
Outdoors					123	0.28	+0.11
Sustainable NZ					23	0.05	—
Vision NZ					23	0.05	—
Social Credit					14	0.03	±0.00
TEA					9	0.02	—
Heartland					3	0.01	—
Informal votes		928			275		
Total valid votes		44,078			44,406		
Turnout		45,510	84.07				
National hold	Majority	5,119	11.61				

=== 2017 election ===
2017 general election: Taupo
Notes:	Blue background denotes the winner of the electorate vote. Pink background denotes a candidate elected from their party list. Yellow background denotes an electorate win by a list member, or other incumbent. A ✓ or ✗ denotes status of any incumbent, win or lose respectively.						
Party	Candidate	Votes	%	±%	Party votes	%	±%
National	✓ Louise Upston	24,611	61.84	−0.75	21,744	53.7	−3.24
Labour	Ala Al-Bustanji	10,276	25.82	+5.18	11,683	28.9	+10.33
Green	Julie Sandilands	3,118	7.83	+2.44	1,388	3.43	−2.69
Outdoors	Alan Frank Simmons	814	2.05	—	68	0.17	—
Conservative	Denis Shuker	321	0.81	−1.67	111	0.27	−4.48
NZ First					3,634	8.98	−1.28
Opportunities					918	2.27	—
Māori Party					262	0.65	−0.17
ACT					194	0.48	0.23
Legalise Cannabis					120	0.3	−0.11
Ban 1080					108	0.27	−0.34
People's Party					33	0.08	—
Mana					15	0.04	−0.48 (Note: 2017 Mana Party swing is relative to the votes for Internet-Mana in 2014; it shared a party list with the Internet Party in the 2014 election)
Democrats					13	0.03	−0.05
United Future					12	0.03	−0.23
Internet					6	0.01	−0.51 (Note: 2017 Internet Party swing is relative to the votes for Internet-Mana in 2014; it shared a party list with Mana Party in the 2014 election)
Informal votes		658			151		
Total valid votes		39,798			40,460		
National hold	Majority	14,335	36.02	−2.35			

=== 2014 election ===
2014 general election: Taupō
Notes:	Blue background denotes the winner of the electorate vote. Pink background denotes a candidate elected from their party list. Yellow background denotes an electorate win by a list member, or other incumbent. A ✓ or ✗ denotes status of any incumbent, win or lose respectively.						
Party	Candidate	Votes	%	±%	Party votes	%	±%
National	✓ Louise Upston	22,428	62.59	−1.06	20,703	56.94	+0.63
Labour	Jamie Strange	7,402	20.64	−0.09	6,752	18.57	−1.71
NZ First	Edwin Perry	2,310	6.44	+1.85	3,730	10.26	+1.87
Green	Dave Robinson	1,934	5.39	−0.86	2,224	6.12	−1.43
Conservative	Lance Gedge	891	2.48	−0.26	1,236	4.75	+1.09
Māori Party	Claire Winitana	366	1.02	+1.02	298	0.82	+0.15
United Future	Alan Simmons	143	0.40	−0.26	94	0.26	−0.66
Democrats	John Pemberton	71	0.20	+0.20	29	0.08	+0.02
Ban 1080					223	0.61	+0.61
Internet Mana					190	0.52	+0.11
Legalise Cannabis					148	0.41	−0.06
ACT					91	0.25	−0.91
Civilian					13	0.03	+0.03
Independent Coalition					10	0.03	+0.03
Focus					7	0.02	+0.02
Informal votes		299			121		
Total valid votes		35,384			36,362		
National hold	Majority	13,951	38.37	−4.55			

=== 2011 election ===
2011 general election: Taupō
Notes:	Blue background denotes the winner of the electorate vote. Pink background denotes a candidate elected from their party list. Yellow background denotes an electorate win by a list member, or other incumbent. A ✓ or ✗ denotes status of any incumbent, win or lose respectively.						
Party	Candidate	Votes	%	±%	Party votes	%	±%
National	✓ Louise Upston	20,934	63.65	+5.74	19,003	56.31	+2.74
Labour	Frances Campbell	6,819	20.73	−18.71	6,844	20.28	−8.92
Green	Zane McCarthy	2,056	6.25	+6.25	2,549	7.55	+3.05
NZ First	Edwin Perry	1,508	4.59	+4.59	2,833	8.39	+3.25
Conservative	Mark Breetvelt	900	2.74	+2.74	1,236	3.66	+3.66
Mana	Keriana Reedy	266	0.81	+0.81	140	0.41	+0.41
United Future	Alan Simmons	216	0.66	−0.42	311	0.92	+0.12
ACT	Rosanne Jollands	190	0.58	+0.58	394	1.17	−2.34
Māori Party					226	0.67	−0.25
Legalise Cannabis					157	0.47	+0.13
Libertarianz					22	0.07	+0.03
Democrats					20	0.06	−0.01
Alliance					12	0.04	−0.02
Informal votes		721			239		
Total valid votes		32,889			33,747		
National hold	Majority	14,115	42.92	+24.45			

Electorate (as at 26 November 2011): 45,800

=== 2008 election ===
2008 general election: Taupō
Notes:	Blue background denotes the winner of the electorate vote. Pink background denotes a candidate elected from their party list. Yellow background denotes an electorate win by a list member, or other incumbent. A ✓ or ✗ denotes status of any incumbent, win or lose respectively.						
Party	Candidate	Votes	%	±%	Party votes	%	±%
National	Louise Upston	20,211	57.91	+16.84	19,001	53.57	+9.32
Labour	✗ Mark Burton	13,766	39.44	−6.06	10,359	29.20	−8.10
United Future	Max Edwards	377	1.08	−0.98	284	0.80	−1.81
Independent	Robbie Mac	313	0.90				
Independent	Martin Bloxham	236	0.68				
NZ First					1,824	5.14	−2.61
Green					1,599	4.51	+0.80
ACT					1,245	3.51	+2.29
Māori Party					325	0.92	−0.23
Progressive					236	0.67	−0.30
Bill and Ben					199	0.56	
Kiwi					133	0.37	
Legalise Cannabis					119	0.34	+0.06
Family Party					61	0.17	
Democrats					23	0.06	+0.01
Pacific					22	0.06	
Alliance					20	0.06	+0.01
Libertarianz					13	0.04	
Workers Party					6	0.02	
RONZ					3	0.01	
RAM					0	0.00	
Informal votes		424			201		
Total valid votes		34,903			35,472		
Turnout		35,937	80.15	−0.09			
National gain from Labour	Majority	6,445	18.47	+22.90			

=== 2005 election ===
2005 general election: Taupo
Notes:	Blue background denotes the winner of the electorate vote. Pink background denotes a candidate elected from their party list. Yellow background denotes an electorate win by a list member, or other incumbent. A ✓ or ✗ denotes status of any incumbent, win or lose respectively.						
Party	Candidate	Votes	%	±%	Party votes	%	±%
Labour	✓ Mark Burton	13,211	45.50	−10.12	10,977	37.30	−2.30
National	Weston Kirton	11,926	41.07	+12.15	13,020	44.25	+22.34
NZ First	Kristin Campbell Smith	1,337	4.60		2,281	7.75	−5.59
Green	John Davis	751	2.59	−2.50	1,093	3.71	−1.68
United Future	Paul Check	598	2.06	−1.20	769	2.61	−2.99
Māori Party	Billy Maea	501	1.73		338	1.15	
ACT	Andrew Jollands	275	0.75	−3.23	358	1.22	−5.03
Destiny	Charles Te Kowhai	260	0.90		142	0.48	
Progressive	David Reeks	167	0.58	−0.40	285	0.97	−0.58
RONZ	Debra Potroz	11	0.04		2	0.01	
Legalise Cannabis					82	0.28	−0.22
Christian Heritage					24	0.08	
Alliance					15	0.05	−5.49
Democrats					15	0.05	
Libertarianz					12	0.04	
Family Rights					5	0.02	
Direct Democracy					4	0.01	
99 MP					2	0.01	
One NZ					2	0.01	−0.04
Informal votes		207			95		
Total valid votes		29,037			29,426		
Turnout		29,722	80.24	+4.48			
Labour hold	Majority	1,285	4.43	−22.27			

=== 2002 election ===
2002 general election: Taupo
Notes:	Blue background denotes the winner of the electorate vote. Pink background denotes a candidate elected from their party list. Yellow background denotes an electorate win by a list member, or other incumbent. A ✓ or ✗ denotes status of any incumbent, win or lose respectively.						
Party	Candidate	Votes	%	±%	Party votes	%	±%
Labour	✓ Mark Burton	14,851	55.62	+6.20	10,775	39.60	+0.74
National	Weston Kirton	7,723	28.92	−7.61	5,961	21.91	−11.67
Green	Nicholas Fisher	1,359	5.09	+1.50	1,467	5.39	+0.37
ACT	Diane Mulcock	1,062	3.98	+0.82	1,700	6.25	−0.81
United Future	Denis Gilmore	871	3.26		1,523	5.60	+3.99^{a}
Christian Heritage	Donald Wishart	360	1.35	−0.74	292	1.07	−0.80
Progressive	Victor Bradley	261	0.98		426	1.55	
Alliance	John Harré	214	0.80	−1.52	193	0.73	−4.81
NZ First					3,629	13.34	+8.81
ORNZ					1,072	3.94	
Legalise Cannabis					137	0.50	−0.45
Mana Māori					19	0.07	+0.01
One NZ					13	0.05	−0.01
NMP					1	0.00	−0.03
Informal votes		371			85		
Total valid votes		26,701			27,210		
Turnout		27,538	75.76				
Labour hold	Majority	7,128	26.70	+13.81			

^{a} United Future swing is compared to the 1999 results of United NZ and Future NZ, who merged in 2000.

=== 1999 election ===
1999 general election: Taupo
Notes:	Blue background denotes the winner of the electorate vote. Pink background denotes a candidate elected from their party list. Yellow background denotes an electorate win by a list member, or other incumbent. A ✓ or ✗ denotes status of any incumbent, win or lose respectively.						
Party	Candidate	Votes	%	±%	Party votes	%	±%
Labour	✓ Mark Burton	13,721	49.42		10,876	38.86	
National	David Steele	10,143	36.53		9,399	33.58	
Green	Nick Fisher	997	3.59		1,405	5.02	
ACT	Richard Steele	877	3.16		1,976	7.06	
NZ First	Ross Honeyfield	718	2.59		1,269	4.53	
Alliance	Wayne Morris	644	2.32		1,550	5.54	
Christian Heritage	John van der Zee	580	2.09		524	1.87	
Mauri Pacific	Rovina Anderson	51	0.18		20	0.71	
Mana Wahine	Makere Rangitoheriri	34	0.12				
Future NZ					341	1.22	
Legalise Cannabis					265	0.95	
Libertarianz					111	0.40	
United NZ					110	0.39	
McGillicuddy Serious					41	0.15	
Animals First					36	0.13	
One NZ					17	0.06	
Mana Māori					16	0.06	
Natural Law					8	0.03	
NMP					8	0.03	
Freedom Movement					6	0.02	
People's Choice					5	0.02	
Republican					3	0.01	
South Island					0	0.00	
Informal votes		514			293		
Total valid votes		27,765			27,986		
Labour hold	Majority	3,578	12.89				

=== 1981 election ===
1981 general election: Taupo
Party	Candidate	Votes	%	±%
National	Roger McClay	6,883	38.44	
Labour	Jack Ridley	6,847	38.24	−3.87
Social Credit	Jim Elder	4,175	23.31	+6.76
Majority		36	0.20	
Turnout		17,905	86.32	+19.62
Registered electors		20,742		

- Result as declared by the High Court after an electoral petition.

=== 1978 election ===
1978 general election: Taupo
Party	Candidate	Votes	%	±%
Labour	Jack Ridley	7,119	42.11	+2.22
National	Lesley A. Miller	6,510	38.51	
Social Credit	Jim Elder	2,798	16.55	
Values	Warwick Keys	477	2.82	
Majority		609	3.60	
Turnout		16,904	66.70	−13.86
Registered electors		25,341		

=== 1975 election ===
1975 general election: Taupo
Party	Candidate	Votes	%	±%
National	Ray La Varis	8,821	48.82	
Labour	Jack Ridley	7,207	39.89	−9.72
Social Credit	Dorothy Gould	1,177	6.51	
Values	John Grant	862	4.77	
Majority		1,614	8.93	
Turnout		18,067	80.56	−7.52
Registered electors		22,425		

=== 1972 election ===
1972 general election: Taupo
Party	Candidate	Votes	%	±%
Labour	Jack Ridley	7,484	49.61	
National	Jim Higgins	6,701	44.42	
Social Credit	Robert Smith	711	4.71	
New Democratic	Nola Fairweather	111	0.73	
Liberal Reform	Patrick Martin Fenton	76	0.50	
Majority		783	5.19	
Turnout		15,083	88.08	+0.39
Registered electors		17,123		

=== 1969 election ===
1969 general election: Taupo
Party	Candidate	Votes	%	±%
National	Rona Stevenson	7,148	46.16	+1.14
Labour	Jack Ingram	7,041	45.46	
Social Credit	Heather New	1,296	8.36	
Majority		107	0.69	−1.06
Turnout		15,485	87.69	+0.42
Registered electors		17,658		

=== 1966 election ===
1966 general election: Taupo
Party	Candidate	Votes	%	±%
National	Rona Stevenson	6,608	45.02	+3.16
Labour	Barry Gustafson	6,350	43.26	
Social Credit	Jack Dunn	1,719	11.71	
Majority		258	1.75	−0.17
Turnout		14,677	87.27	−2.17
Registered electors		16,817		

In 1966 National, afraid the seat would go to Labour, poured thousands of dollars into the local campaign. A hundred women from all over Waikato canvassed every house in Tokoroa and Putāruru over two days, using the street lists and blue dot system. The seat was held by 258 votes.

=== 1963 election ===
1963 general election: Taupo
Party	Candidate	Votes	%	±%
National	Rona Stevenson	5,995	41.86	
Labour	Jack Ingram	5,720	39.94	
Social Credit	Claude Watson	1,093	7.63	
Majority		275	1.92	
Turnout		12,808	89.44	
Registered electors		14,319		
