= Ray La Varis =

Ramon John (Ray) La Varis (also known as Del La Varis; 19 February 1932 – 14 December 1986) was an importer in Auckland, New Zealand, and a politician of the National Party.

== Early years ==
La Varis was born in Auckland in 1932. He received his education at King's School and King's College. In 1975, he married Christine Brewer (later known as Christine McElwee) who would serve five terms on the Taupō District Council from 1995 to 2010.

== Political career ==
New Zealand Parliament
Years	Term	Electorate	Party
1975–1978	38th	Taupo	National

In 1971 La Varis stood unsuccessfully for the Auckland City Council. He contested the Waitemata electorate in 1972 election, finishing second to Michael Bassett.

He represented the Taupo electorate from the 1975 election, when he defeated Labour's Jack Ridley. Due to ill health he did not stand for re-election in the 1978 election and Ridley recaptured the electorate.
