= Qiulae Wong =

New Zealand politician (born 1988)

Qiulae Wong MP
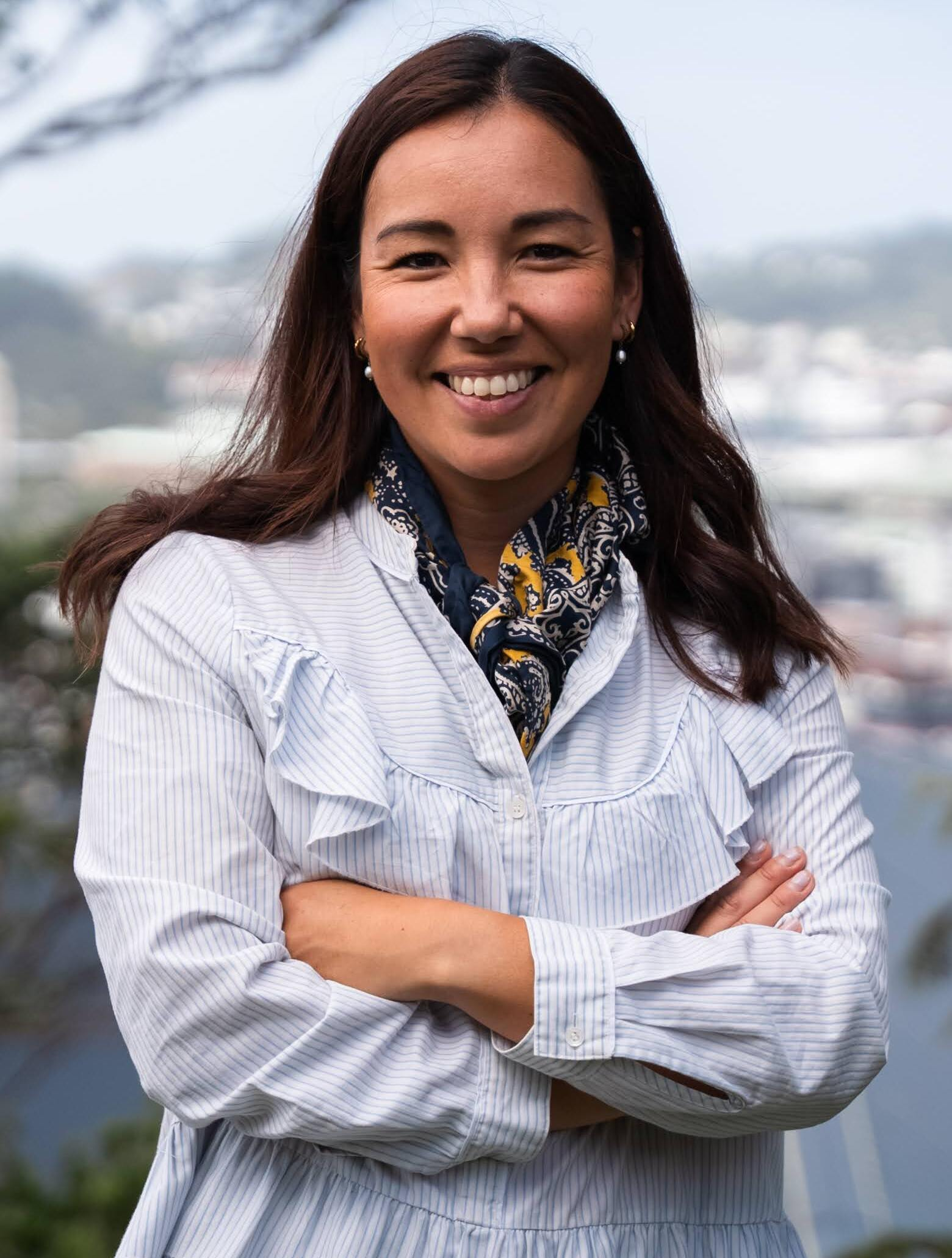
- Wong in 2026

4th Leader of the Opportunity Party
- Incumbent
- Assumed office 16 November 2025
- Deputy: Daniel Eb
- Preceded by: Raf Manji

Member of the New Zealand Parliament for Opportunity Party List
- Incumbent
- Assumed office 7 November 2026

Personal details
- Born: May 1988 (age 38) Fiji
- Citizenship: New Zealand
- Party: Opportunity Party
- Education: University of Auckland
- Occupation: Politician, businesswoman
- Website: www.opportunity.org.nz

Chinese name
- Chinese: 黄秋蕾
Transcriptions
Standard Mandarin
- Hanyu Pinyin: Huáng Qiūlěi
Yue: Cantonese
- Jyutping: Wong4 Cau1Leoi5

Qiulae Wong (/ˈkjuː.leɪ/; born 1988), also known by her initial Q, is a New Zealand businesswoman and politician who has been the leader of the Opportunity Party since November 2025. Provisionally elected in the 2026 New Zealand general election, Wong is a list MP based in the Mt Albert electorate.

She was previously a sustainable business consultant at KPMG.

== Early life and education ==
Qiulae Wong was born in Fiji in May 1988. She is of Chinese and European descent. Her mother, Margaret Malcolm, was a senior advisor to Judith Collins, and chief executive of the Law Association. Her father is a native speaker of Cantonese. Wong grew up in the Auckland suburb of One Tree Hill.

She attended Diocesan School for Girls and graduated from the University of Auckland with a double degree in law and politics.

== Early career ==
Wong worked with the Ethical Fashion Group, specifically Common Objective, which supported businesses such as Vivienne Westwood and Stella McCartney in their transition toward more sustainable business models. She went on to work as a sustainable business consultant at KPMG.

== Political career ==
=== Leader of the Opportunity Party (2025–present) ===
New Zealand Parliament
| Years | Term | Electorate | List | Party |
|---|---|---|---|---|
| 2026–present | 55th | List | 1 | Opportunity |

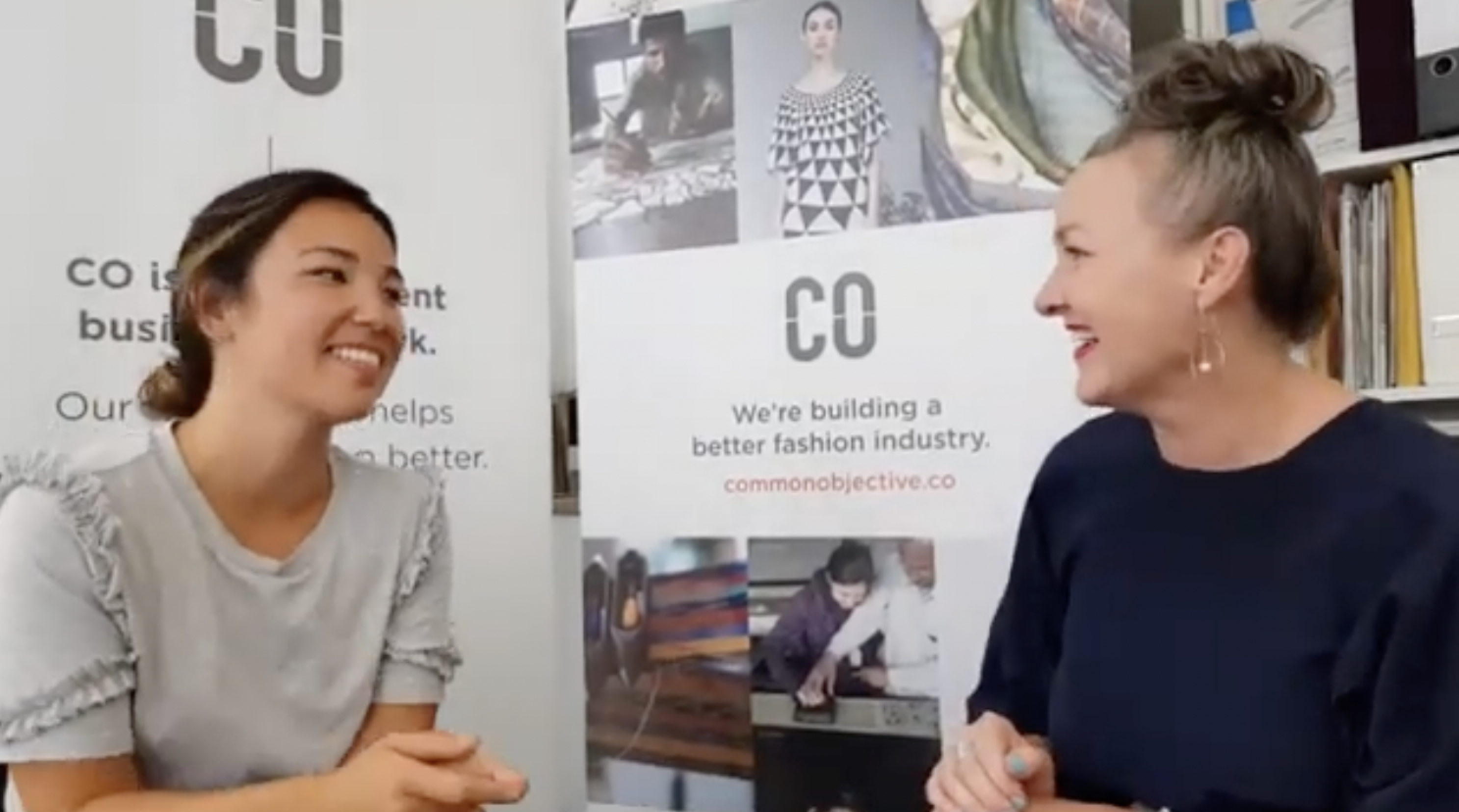
Wong in 2018 from an interview with The Formary while working at Common Objective

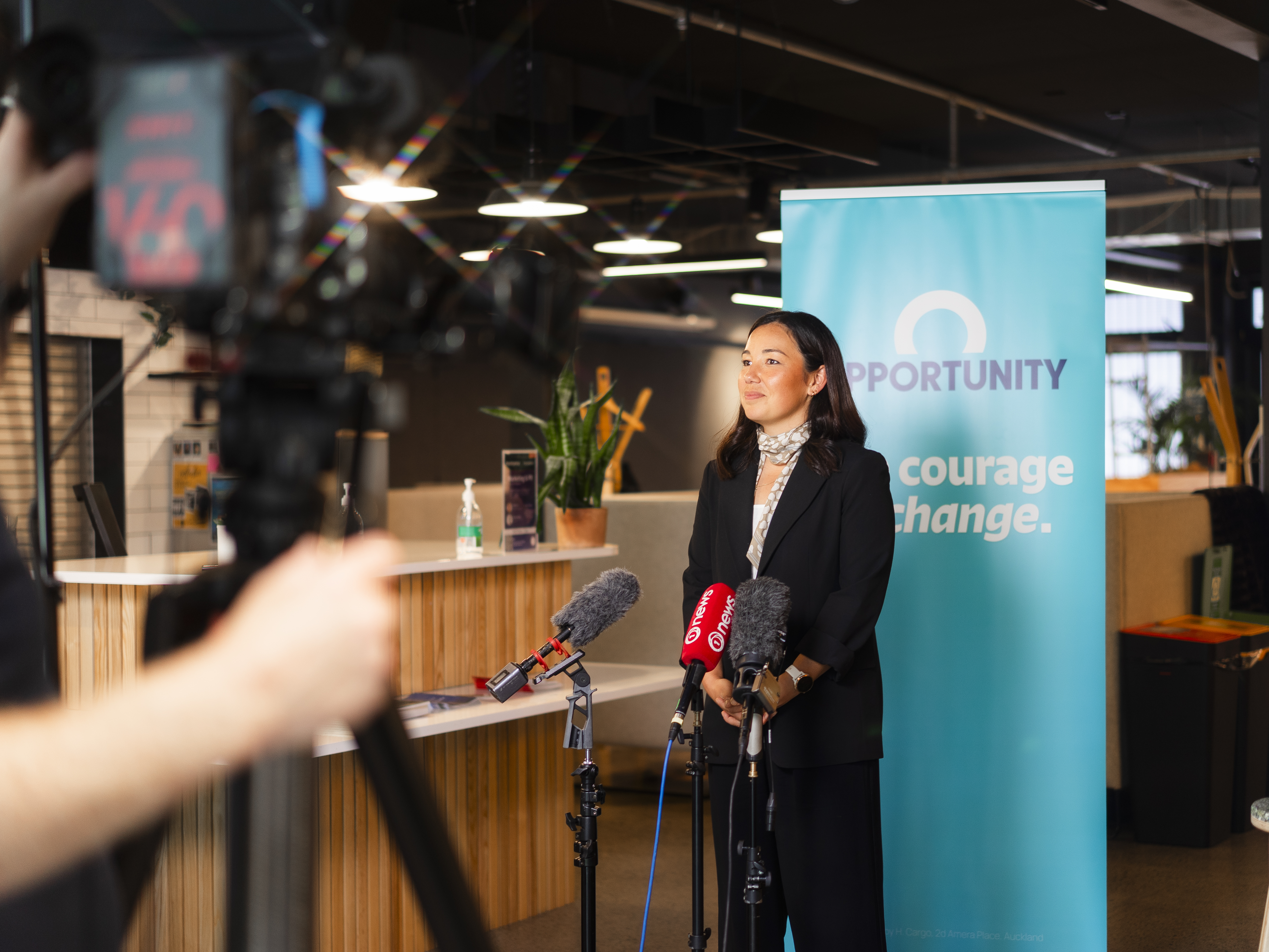
Wong addressing media in 2025

Opportunity, a political party founded by Gareth Morgan in 2016, lacked a permanent leader from 2023 to 2025 following the resignation of Raf Manji. Wong was chosen from several applicants to lead the party as its fifth leader in the 2026 election. She was chosen despite not having wide name recognition or experience in parliament, which is atypical in New Zealand politics. The party's board shortened the party's name to "Opportunity" to coincide with her becoming leader.

Wong announced that the party would contest the November 2026 general election with a more centrist platform, including reducing house prices through a land value tax, and introducing a "Citizen's Voice," consisting of citizens' assemblies for certain major issues. Wong fronted many community and television appearances before the election.

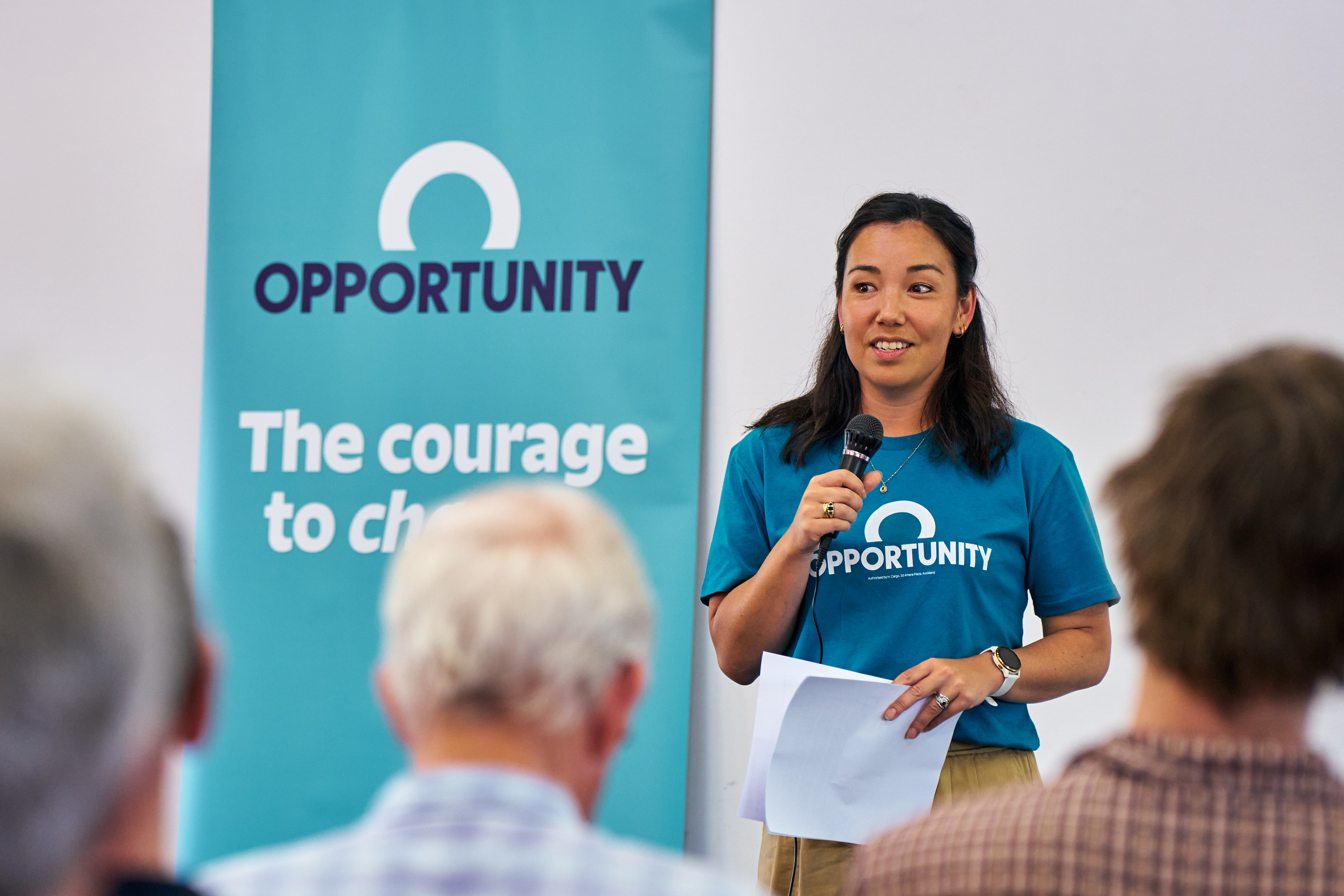
Wong speaking at an event in 2025

Wong has emphasised the need for the party to broaden its appeal to ordinary voters, acknowledging past criticism that the party focused heavily on detailed policy at the expense of connecting with the electorate. As part of this repositioning, Wong has described three broad areas of policy focus: combatting "divisive politics", including through the use of citizens' assemblies on complex issues; building New Zealand's "next economy"; and prioritising environmental restoration as a foundation for long-term economic activity.

Under her leadership, Opportunity's platform focuses on economic growth and includes a major tax proposal. She supports implementing a ratepayer assistance scheme to provide low-interest loans for electric upgrades, arguing that transitioning away from gas is an "equity issue" for lower-income New Zealanders. She has advocated for policies such as a land value tax, a citizens' income for most adults, and a flat income tax to address housing affordability and wealth inequality. These proposals are part of Wong's broader pitch that New Zealand needs fundamental changes to its tax system to support families and small businesses.

On 13 February 2026, Wong announced that the party would campaign to replace all forms of welfare assistance, including superannuation, with a means-tested income support for citizens. Unlike universal basic income, people earning more than NZ$350,000 a year would not be eligible for it. The citizen's income policy would be funded by a land value tax, and savings from the benefits that would be replaced. On 16 February, Wong confirmed she would contest the Mount Albert electorate. During the party's State of the Nation address in Auckland on 21 February, Wong said that Opportunity would campaign on promoting national unity, banning bottom trawling and investing in renewal energy.

In early July 2026, Wong announced Opportunity's economic policies, which included investing in technology and commerce, strengthening the Commerce Commission's powers and forgiving student loan interest in order to draw back emigrant New Zealanders. While Opportunity has expressed an openness to forming a coalition with either Labour or National, Wong subsequently qualified her party's position by stating that it would not support a government that had Winston Peters as foreign minister.

In mid-August 2026, Wong said that Opportunity would campaign on introducing several policies to regulate lobbying and political donations including capping political donations and establishing an independent anti-corruption entity to coordinate anti-corruption activities. On 18 September 2026, Wong released Opportunity's climate change policies, which included introducing a methane emissions trading scheme and investing $5 billion in climate adaptation. On 30 September, Wong announced the party's five "non-negotiable" policies including a ten-year health plan, lobbying reform, banning bottom trawling, attacking monopolies and duopolies and bolstering the country's climate change commitments.

On 9 October 2026, Wong said that Opportunity would consider not progressing its tax reform policies in the next term in return for securing concessions during potential coalition negotiations with the centre-right National Party. In mid October 2026, Wong said they would first negotiate with whichever party received the most seats, after earlier saying it would be the party with the most votes.

During the 2026 general election held on 7 November, Wong came third place in the Mt Albert electorate, gaining 3,960 votes based on preliminary results. The electorate was retained by the incumbent Labour MP Helen White. Opportunity gained 5.96% of the popular vote and won seven list seats based on preliminary results, meeting the five percent party vote threshold needed to enter Parliament. This marked the first time in 30 years since the introduction of the Mixed Member Proportional system that a new party had entered the New Zealand Parliament without a sitting member of parliament leaving an existing party. Following the 2026 election, Wong indicated that Opportunity could enter a formal coalition, or may provide confidence and supply, or sit on the crossbenches.

== Political views ==
Wong has been widely characterised as both a centrist and as socially liberal. She has cited former Green Party co-leader James Shaw and former National Party Prime Minister John Key as her political heroes, due to her admiration for politicians working across the political aisle. Wong has advocated a more pragmatic approach to environmentalism in New Zealand politics, and has emphasised the importance of working across parties for meaningful policy outcomes.

== Personal life ==
During nine years she spent in London, she met her husband Grant, who is originally from Palmerston North in New Zealand. The couple married and had their first daughter in 2020 while living overseas during the COVID-19 pandemic. The birth of her first daughter prompted a desire to reconnect with family, and after returning to New Zealand in 2022, Wong gave birth to their second daughter.
