= Natalia Albert =

New Zealand former political candidate

5th Deputy Leader of The Opportunities Party
- In office 4 August 2023 – 2024
- Leader: Raf Manji
- Preceded by: Shai Navot and Jessica Hammond
- Succeeded by: Daniel Eb

Personal details
- Born: 1982 (age 43–44) Mexico City, Mexico
- Party: The Opportunities Party (TOP) (Former)
- Education: Victoria University of Wellington (master's degree)

Natalia Llorente Albert (born 1982) is a Mexican-born New Zealand former public servant and businesswoman who served as the Deputy Leader of The Opportunities Party (TOP) in 2023.

== Early life ==
Albert was born in Mexico City as an only child to her mother who was a Mexican diplomat. She spent most of her life travelling around the world to various countries including Canada and the United States. Albert grew up speaking English and Spanish fluently. Albert moved to New Zealand in 2011, to join her parents in Wellington, where they had resided.

Albert had also been the director and founder of TedXWellingtonWomen which was founded by her in 2013 to promote diversity and women's rights. She had also been the producer of an entertainment firm and served as the Chief Operating Officer of the Inspiring Stories Trust.

== Political career ==
Although Albert had worked within government agencies and sectors as a public servant, she first entered the political sphere in 2023, running for The Opportunities Party in Wellington Central.

As Wellington Central candidate, Albert swiftly made a name for herself and quickly climbed up the ranks of The Opportunities Party, quickly reaching number 2 on the list and being appointed as the deputy leader of The Opportunities Party in a candidate list announcement on 4 August 2023, by party leader Raf Manji.

Albert had stated that her party's role in the 2023 general election was that of advocacy and holding some of the more mainstream New Zealand political parties to account, when it came to their engagement within ethnic as well as migrant communities.

Albert also accounted some of the troubles and fears associated with being a woman and seeking political office in New Zealand. She stated that it was highly likely she would not door knock past 5pm and would travel with a group.

Albert stated during the Aro Valley debate, that she was primarily seeking the party vote, rather than the electorate vote. She made clear emphasis and spent her speaking time explaining some of the merits of "cross-party solidarity."

During the 2023 election held on 14 October, Albert came fourth place in Wellington Central with 1,554 votes. TOP received 2.22% of the party vote, below the five percent threshold needed to enter Parliament.

== Personal life ==
Albert had completed her Masters of Political Science at Victoria University of Wellington on 18 August 2023. Her thesis was Diversifying Leadership Within the Public Service Sphere of New Zealand. She is working towards her doctoral degree in political science, and did so while actively campaigning for Wellington Central and The Opportunities Party in 2023.

Prior to arriving in New Zealand, Albert had held a degree in business and had managerial experience in the hotel sector.
