= Raf Manji =

New Zealand investment banker and politician

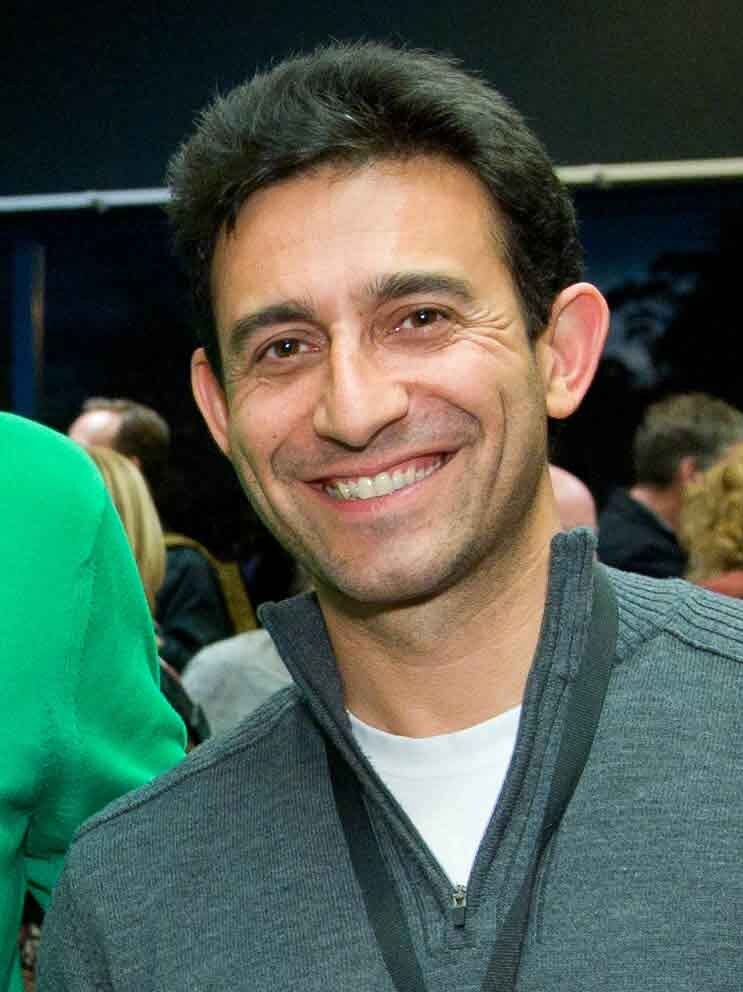
- Manji in 2012

3rd Leader of The Opportunities Party
- In office 27 January 2022 – 3 December 2023
- Deputy: Natalia Albert
- Preceded by: Shai Navot (as interim leader)
- Succeeded by: Qiulae Wong

Member of the Christchurch City Council
- In office 24 October 2013 – 12 October 2019
- Preceded by: Sally Buck
- Succeeded by: Sam MacDonald
- Constituency: Fendalton-Waimairi (2013–2016); Waimairi (2016–2019)

Personal details
- Born: 1966 (age 59–60) London, United Kingdom
- Party: TOP (until 2025)

Raf Alfred Manji (born 1966) is a former New Zealand politician, with a background in governance, finance and social enterprise. He was the leader of the Opportunities Party (TOP) from 27 January 2022 to 3 December 2023.

== Early life ==
Manji was born in London to an Indian Muslim father who worked as a banker and an Irish Catholic mother. He was educated at the University of Manchester, graduating with a degree in economics and social studies. He went travelling in Asia and met a New Zealand woman, whom he later married. He worked as an investment banker, before migrating to New Zealand with his family in 2002. He earned a Graduate Diploma in Politics and a Masters in International Law and Politics from the University of Canterbury. He worked for non-profits and volunteering before becoming involved in the Volunteer Army Foundation.

== Political career ==
Manji was elected to the Christchurch City Council for the Fendalton-Waimairi ward in 2013 after being encouraged to run by mayor Lianne Dalziel. He quickly became Dalziel's right-hand man on finance issues with the support of Deputy Mayor Andrew Turner, serving as deputy chair on financial committees and helping to manage the post-earthquake rebuild. He was re-elected in the Waimairi Ward in 2016.

Manji contested the electorate of Ilam, which had been a safe seat for the National Party, as an independent at the 2017 New Zealand general election. He campaigned on a platform of being a voice for Christchurch during its recovery from the 2011 Christchurch earthquake, including promoting the idea of an investment fund for local housing, and Christchurch bidding to host the 2026 Commonwealth Games. Manji polled well, coming second behind incumbent National Party MP Gerry Brownlee, and ahead of the Labour Party candidate.

He retired from the Christchurch City Council at the 2019 New Zealand local elections.

Following the 2019 Christchurch mosque shootings, Manji suggested that inequality resulting from financial deregulation had helped radicalise alt-right terrorism. He was subsequently appointed to chair an advisory group to decide how to use money raised to support the victims. Following the approach used after the Grenfell Tower fire he established a "listening project" and spent months meeting with victims and hearing their stories. In November 2020, he advocated for a $34.8 million government compensation package to victims and their families.

On 27 January 2022, he was announced as the new leader of the Opportunities Party. He contested the Ilam seat at the 2023 New Zealand general election. Manji came second place behind National Party candidate Hamish Campbell in the Ilam electorate, winning 10,863 votes. TOP only received 2.22% of the party vote, which was below the five percent threshold needed to enter Parliament.

On 3 December 2023, he announced that he was stepping down from his role as leader of the Opportunities Party following the party's failure to be elected to parliament in the general election.

Manji unsuccessfully ran to be a Christchurch city councillor, this time for the Central ward, as an independent candidate in the 2025 local elections. As of 2025, he is no longer affiliated with the Opportunities Party.
