= Mark Burton (politician) =

New Zealand politician

The Honourable Mark Burton
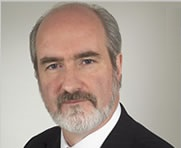

34th Minister of Defence
- In office 10 December 1999 – 12 October 2005
- Prime Minister: Helen Clark
- Preceded by: Max Bradford
- Succeeded by: Phil Goff

44th Minister of Justice
- In office 19 October 2005 – 31 October 2007
- Prime Minister: Helen Clark
- Preceded by: Phil Goff
- Succeeded by: Annette King

Member of the New Zealand Parliament for Taupō
- In office 6 November 1993 – 8 November 2008
- Preceded by: New constituency
- Succeeded by: Louise Upston
- Majority: 1,285

Personal details
- Born: 16 January 1956 (age 70) Northampton, Northamptonshire, England
- Party: Labour

Richard Mark Burton (born 16 January 1956) is a New Zealand politician. He is a member of the Labour Party, having served as Minister of Defence, Minister of Justice, Minister of Local Government, Minister in Charge of Treaty of Waitangi Negotiations, Deputy Leader of the House, and the Minister Responsible for the Law Commission in the Fifth Labour Government of New Zealand.

== Early life ==
Burton was born in Northampton, England, but was brought to New Zealand by his family when ten years old. He attended high school in Wanganui, attending Wanganui Boys College and was in the year group ahead of future National MP Michael Laws. He has been involved in a wide range of social and community organisations, including the Red Cross, the Department of Social Welfare, the Central Plateau Rural Education Activities Programme, the Council of Social Services, the Taupō Employment Support Trust, and the Taupō Sexual Abuse Counselling Service. He received the New Zealand 1990 Commemoration Medal for his work.

== Member of Parliament ==
New Zealand Parliament
Years	Term	Electorate	List	Party
1993–1996	44th	Tongariro		Labour
1996–1999	45th	Taupo	10	Labour
1999–2002	46th	Taupo	18	Labour
2002–2005	47th	Taupo	16	Labour
2005–2008	48th	Taupo	16	Labour

In the 1993 election, Burton stood as the Labour Party's candidate for Tongariro, an electorate in the central North Island, defeating Ian Peters. This later became the seat of Taupō, which Burton retained.

From 1996 to 1999, he served as his party's Senior Whip.

=== Cabinet minister ===
When the Labour Party won power in the 1999 election, Burton became part of the new Cabinet, assuming the roles of Minister of Internal Affairs, Minister of Defence, Minister for State-Owned Enterprises, Minister of Tourism, and Minister of Veterans' Affairs. In 2002, Internal Affairs and Veterans' Affairs were transferred to George Hawkins. In February 2005 he became the Minister of Treaty of Waitangi Negotiations, and dropped the State-Owned Enterprises portfolio.

In late 2004, with Jonathan Hunt set to retire from politics, Burton was regarded by many as the Labour Party's preferred choice to replace him as Speaker of the House of Representatives. In the end, however, Labour decided to nominate Margaret Wilson for the position.

Burton sponsored the introduction of the Electoral Finance Act, which made election funding more transparent and open by making anonymous donations illegal if they exceed the sum of $12,000. The Act capped the highest donation to the sum of $120,000 and increased public funding in elections to allow for more funding to go to a wider range of parties. The Act extended the regulated period classifying an election year to 1 January of the election year.

In November 2007 Burton resigned from his Cabinet positions during Prime Minister Helen Clark's portfolio renewal. When Labour's party list was written prior to the 2008 general election, he was given a low placing of 39. He then lost his seat in a nationwide swing to the National Party, and due to his place on the list, was not returned to parliament.

Burton stood unsuccessfully for Taupō District Mayor in the 2010 local body elections. After Darren Hughes resigned his list seat in 2011, and the next person on the Labour Party list, Judith Tizard, declined to take it up, Burton was entitled to reenter Parliament for the remainder of the term. However, he also declined the offer.

New Zealand Parliament
Preceded by Ian Peters	Member of Parliament for Tongariro; 1993–1996	Constituency abolished
New constituency	Member of Parliament for Taupō; 1996–2008	Succeeded by Louise Upston
Political offices
Preceded by Max Bradford	Minister of Defence; 1999–2005	Succeeded by Phil Goff
Preceded by Phil Goff	Minister of Justice; 2005–2007	Succeeded by Annette King
Party political offices
Preceded by Jonathan Hunt	Senior Whip of the Labour Party; 1996-1999	Succeeded by Rick Barker
