= Christine McElwee =

New Zealand politician and historian (1946–2022)

- Born: Christina Clare Brewer; 22 July 1946; Whanganui, New Zealand
- Died: 25 June 2022 (aged 75); Taupō, New Zealand
- Other names: Christine La Varis
- Occupations: Politician; historian; author; teacher
- Spouses: Ray La Varis (m. 1975; died 1986) Clayton McElwee (m. 1991; died 2022)
- Children: 1
- Relatives: Cameron Brewer (nephew)

Christine Clare McElwee (formerly La Varis, née Brewer; 22 July 1946 – 25 June 2022) was a New Zealand local politician, historian, author and teacher. She served as a member of the Taupō District Council from 1995 to 2010, including six years as deputy mayor.

== Early life and family ==
McElwee was born on 22 July 1946 in Whanganui. She attended Whanganui Girls' College, where she was head girl. She studied geography at Victoria University of Wellington, where she completed a teaching diploma, and subsequently worked as a high school teacher in Wellington and London. In the 1980s and 1990s, she worked as a tourism marketing consultant.

In 1975, she married Ray La Varis, a politician, who died in 1986. In 1991, she married Clayton McElwee, who predeceased her by two months. She had one daughter.

== Later life ==
McElwee served as a councillor on the Taupō District Council from 1995 to 2010, including six years as deputy mayor. As a councillor she advocated for the environment, the arts, rural communities, and greater accountability and transparency. Her nephew, Cameron Brewer, said that she was a mentor to him in his role as an Auckland city councillor.

McElwee made contributions to Taupō local history. She lived in Acacia Bay for nearly 50 years and was a member of the Acacia Bay Residents Association. She coordinated the Acacia Bay History Project, initiated in 2011. In 2013, she wrote Tribute to Western Bay, Lake Taupō (illustrated by John Parsons). The book described the Western Bay of Lake Taupō, including the development of the Kinloch settlement by former prime minister Keith Holyoake. McElwee had a lifelong interest in horse racing, and in 2015 she was commissioned by the Taupō Racing Club to write Winning Against the Odds, a history of the club from its foundation in 1965 to 2015.

McElwee also had an interest in art; in 1992 she co-authored Ngā Marae o Ngāti Tūwharetoa with local artist Val Raymond, featuring Raymond's drawings of marae around Taupō. After Raymond's death in 2021, in early 2022 McElwee curated Transformation, an exhibition of Raymond's work, at the Taupō Museum. She also helped finish Raymond's book Heritage Painting: Taupō-nui-a-Tia New Zealand, which was published in the same year. In 2018, she helped ensure that an 1889 painting of Lake Taupō by Charles Decimus Barraud, up for auction in Auckland, was purchased by the Taupō Museum.

McElwee died at her home in Taupō on 25 June 2022.

== Selected works ==
- Ngā Marae o Ngāti Tūwharetoa (1992, with Val Raymond)
- Tribute to Western Bay, Lake Taupō (2013, with John Parsons)
- Winning Against the Odds: the Taupō Racing Club's first fifty years, 1965-2015 (2015)
