= Shai Navot =

New Zealand lawyer and politician

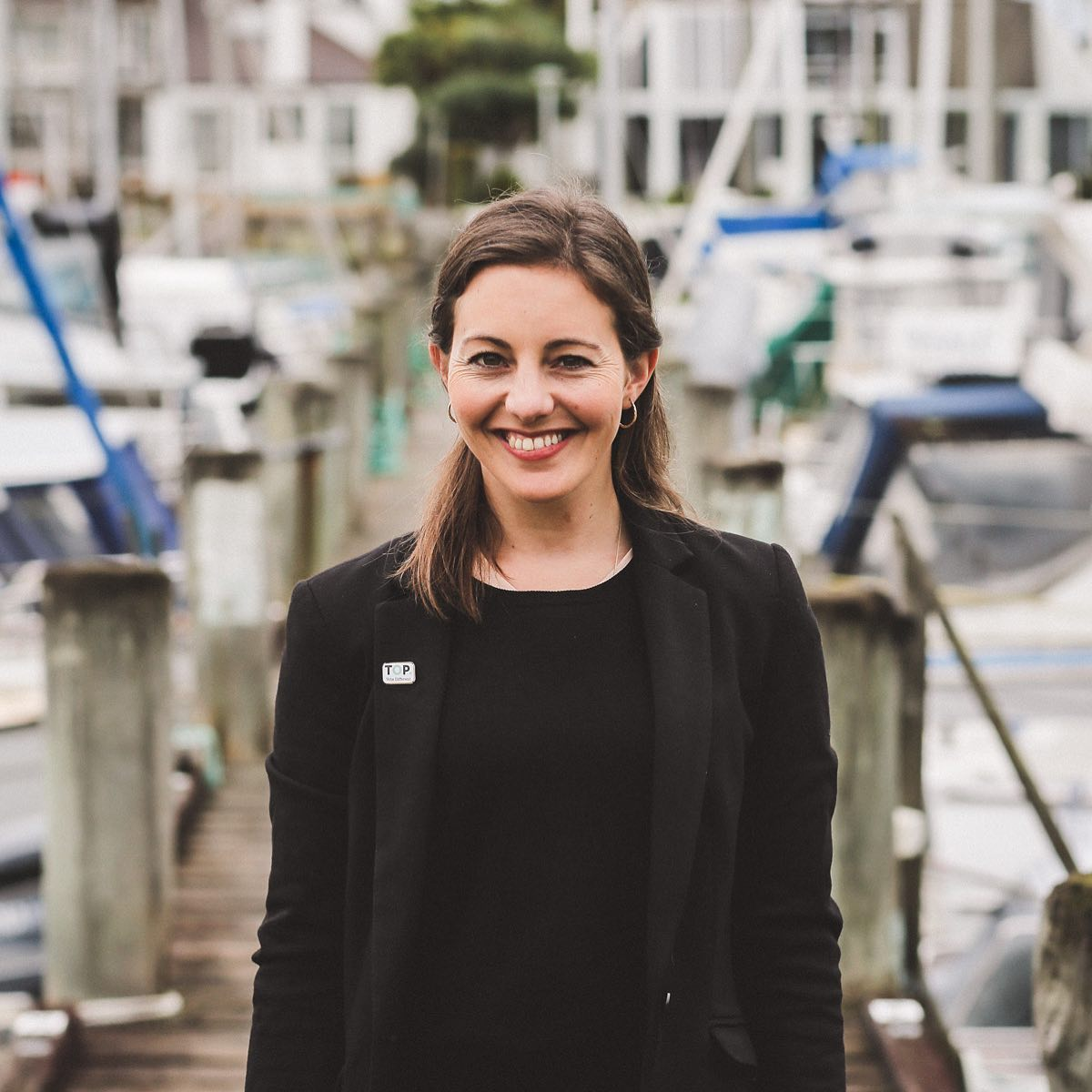
- Navot in 2020

Leader of The Opportunities Party
- Interim
- In office 3 November 2020 – 27 January 2022
- Preceded by: Geoff Simmons
- Succeeded by: Raf Manji

3rd Co-Deputy Leader of The Opportunities Party
- In office 3 March 2023 – 4 August 2023
- Leader: Raf Manji
- Succeeded by: Natalia Albert
- In office 30 April 2020 – 3 November 2020
- Leader: Geoff Simmons
- Preceded by: Teresa Moore

Personal details
- Born: 1985 or 1986 (age 39–40)
- Party: The Opportunities Party
- Education: University of Auckland

Shai Navot (born 1985/1986) is a New Zealand lawyer, former crown prosecutor, and interim leader of the Opportunities Party (TOP) between 2020 and 2022. She previously served as deputy leader of the Opportunities Party during the 2020 election.

== Political history ==
=== 2020 election ===
In April 2020, the Opportunities Party announced Navot as their deputy leader. Navot ran for the Opportunities Party (TOP) in North Shore. This was the first time Navot had run for TOP.

During the campaign, Navot called for tax reform to create more wealth and stop the 'poverty trap'. Navot said TOP's plan for affordable dental care for low-income earners would also improve long-term health outcomes. She also called setting up fruit and veggie box schemes around the country a "no-brainer" and said that community-based responses to food waste (food rescue, food banks, community gardens and compost) were successful models. She supported legalisation of cannabis through the 2020 New Zealand cannabis referendum, saying the current system is not working with cannabis widely available and controlled by criminals, and asking, "Why would you continue with policy that is clearly not working?". Navot led a group of Opportunities Party candidates to gather at an open home to protest the lack of affordable housing. Navot also spoke about possible solutions to child poverty.

In August 2020, Navot criticised National's calls to push back the election date, following Auckland going into a level 3 lockdown. Navot said her party believed the election should proceed on 19 September as planned. Navot said, "They [the National Party] want to delay in the hope they can boost their performance or undermine the outcome, that's the truth of the matter. It's the same tactics Donald Trump is using and it's dangerous, dirty and unwelcome."

Navot did not win the North Shore electorate, coming fifth with 1,493 votes (4% of votes). TOP won no electorates and received 1.5% of the party vote, meaning that neither Navot nor any other TOP candidates won seats in Parliament.

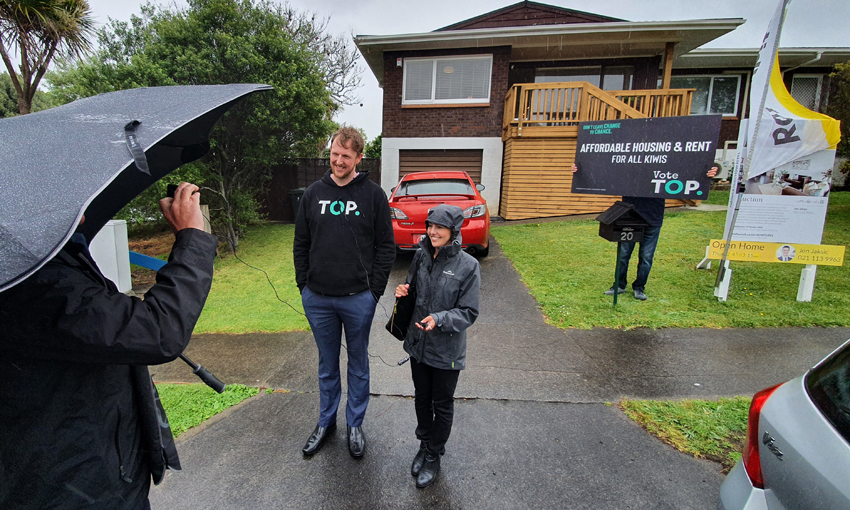
Navot and TOP candidate Hayden Cargo protesting outside an open home, 15 October 2020

=== After the 2020 election ===
In November 2020, at TOP's first AGM after the election, Geoff Simmons resigned as leader of the Opportunities Party and Navot became interim party leader. TOP announced that they intended to contest the 2023 New Zealand general election.

In December 2020, Navot launched a petition with the Opportunities Party to declare a housing emergency, saying, "The Labour Party has just achieved its best-ever election result in 50 years, and they are the first party to govern alone since MMP was brought in. Despite this huge mandate they are showing political weakness over one of the most pressing issues of our time and one that affects all New Zealanders. It's not good enough."

=== 2023 election ===
During the 2023 New Zealand general election, Navot stood as the Opportunities Party's candidate in Upper Harbour. She ranked fifth on the party list. Navot came sixth place, with 1,109 votes. TOP received 2.22% of the party vote, below the five percent threshold needed to enter Parliament.

== Personal life ==
Navot attended Carmel College. Navot began studying towards a Master of Public Policy at University of Auckland in 2017, and will continue this study in 2020.

Navot worked for seven years as a lawyer in both civil litigation and criminal prosecution. Navot initially specialised in pursuing weathertightness claims in the High Court on behalf of the Ministry of Education, and subsequently became a Crown prosecutor in June 2013, where she remained until September 2019. As part of the Crown Specialist team in Auckland, Navot advised on and conducted prosecutions on behalf of various government departments and acted as Crown counsel in criminal prosecutions, including conducting jury trials as lead counsel for the Crown.
