= Tongariro (electorate) =

Tongariro is a former New Zealand parliamentary electorate, from 1984 to 1996. During the four parliamentary terms of its existence, it was represented by three members of parliament.

== Population centres ==
The 1981 census had shown that the North Island had experienced further population growth, and three additional general seats were created through the 1983 electoral redistribution, bringing the total number of electorates to 95. The South Island had, for the first time, experienced a population loss, but its number of general electorates was fixed at 25 since the 1967 electoral redistribution. More of the South Island population was moving to Christchurch, and two electorates were abolished, while two electorates were recreated. In the North Island, six electorates were newly created (including Tongariro), three electorates were recreated, and six electorates were abolished. These changes came into effect with the 1984 election.

In 1996, the first mixed-member proportional (MMP) representation election, most of the Tongariro electorate's area was included in the Taupo electorate.

== History ==
Noel Scott of the Labour Party was the Tongariro electorate's first representative; Scott had in 1981 unsuccessfully contested the adjacent Tarawera electorate. Scott was defeated in Tongariro in the 1990 election by National's Ian Peters, who held the electorate for one parliamentary term before himself being defeated by Labour's Mark Burton in 1993. Burton transferred to the Taupo electorate in 1996.

=== Members of Parliament ===
Key

Labour National

Election	Winner
1984 election	Noel Scott
1987 election	Noel Scott
1990 election	Ian Peters
1993 election	Mark Burton
Electorate abolished in 1996; see Taupo

== Election results ==
=== 1993 election ===
1993 general election: Tongariro
Party	Candidate	Votes	%	±%
Labour	Mark Burton	7,723	47.46	
National	Ian Peters	5,772	35.47	−13.18
Alliance	Jim Elder	2,458	15.10	+13.55
Christian Heritage	Garry Wills	229	1.40	
Natural Law	Andrew Westaway	88	0.54	
Majority		1,951	11.99	
Turnout		16,270	80.10	+16.76
Registered electors		20,311		

=== 1990 election ===
1990 general election: Tongariro
Party	Candidate	Votes	%	±%
National	Ian Peters	6,941	48.65	+7.92
Labour	Noel Scott	6,055	42.44	−13.25
NewLabour	Joan Bloxham	656	4.59	
Independent	Jim Elder	222	1.55	
Social Credit	Isabel Petersen	191	1.33	
Democrats	Wayne Morris	121	0.84	
Independent	Thomas Lennon	79	0.55	
Majority		886	6.21	
Turnout		14,265	63.34	−11.09
Registered electors		22,521		

=== 1987 election ===
1987 general election: Tongariro
Party	Candidate	Votes	%	±%
Labour	Noel Scott	8,826	55.69	+6.38
National	Ian Peters	6,456	40.73	
Democrats	R T Tibble	565	3.56	
Majority		2,370	14.95	−7.53
Turnout		15,847	74.53	−16.68
Registered electors		21,261		

=== 1984 election ===
1984 general election: Tongariro
Party	Candidate	Votes	%	±%
Labour	Noel Scott	8,490	49.31	
National	Nelson Rangi	4,620	26.83	
Social Credit	Jim Elder	2,680	15.56	
NZ Party	Harry Low	923	5.36	
Independent	Jack Ridley	502	2.91	
Majority		3,870	22.48	
Turnout		17,215	91.21	
Registered electors		18,874		
