= Roger McClay =

New Zealand politician (1945–2025)

The Honourable Roger McClay QSO

3rd Commissioner for Children
- In office 1998–2003
- Preceded by: Laurie O'Reilly
- Succeeded by: Cindy Kiro

3rd Minister of Youth Affairs
- In office 2 November 1990 – 8 November 1996
- Prime Minister: Jim Bolger
- Preceded by: Annette King
- Succeeded by: Katherine O'Regan

Member of the New Zealand Parliament for Waikaremoana
- In office 1984–1996
- Preceded by: new electorate
- Succeeded by: electorate abolished

Member of the New Zealand Parliament for Taupo
- In office 1981–1984
- Preceded by: Jack Ridley
- Succeeded by: electorate abolished

Personal details
- Born: Roger Neville McClay; 6 February 1945 Pukekohe, New Zealand
- Died: 7 November 2025 (aged 80) Taupō, New Zealand
- Party: National
- Relations: Todd McClay (son)

Roger Neville McClay QSO (6 February 1945 – 7 November 2025) was a New Zealand politician. He became Minister of Youth Affairs and Associate Minister of Education and Social Welfare during the Fourth National Government. He later held the role of Commissioner for Children from 1998 to 2003.

== Early life and family ==
McClay was born at Pukekohe on 6 February 1945. He was educated at Wesley College and Waiuku College, and went on to study at Ardmore Teachers' College from 1963 to 1964, earning a Trained Teacher's Certificate.

In 1966, McClay married Dawn Ferguson, and the couple went on to have three children.

McClay worked as a primary school teacher and school principal. He was also active in Jaycees, serving as national vice-president in 1980 and as an international senator to World Jaycees.

== Member of Parliament ==
New Zealand Parliament
Years	Term	Electorate	Party
1981–1984	40th	Taupo	National
1984–1987	41st	Waikaremoana	National
1987–1990	42nd	Waikaremoana	National
1990–1993	43rd	Waikaremoana	National
1993–1996	44th	Waikaremoana	National

McClay was an MP from 1981 to 1996, representing the National Party. He was first elected to Parliament in the 1981 election as MP for Taupo, defeating the incumbent Labour MP, Jack Ridley.

In the 1984 election, he contested and won the new seat of Waikaremoana, which he held until he retired at the 1996 election. He became Minister of Youth Affairs and Associate Minister of Education and Social Welfare during the Fourth National Government. He later held the role of Commissioner for Children from 1998 to 2003.

In 1990, McClay was awarded the New Zealand 1990 Commemoration Medal.

His son, Todd McClay, was elected as the National Party Member of Parliament for Rotorua at the 2008 general election.

== Post-parliament career ==
In the 2005 New Year Honours, McClay was made a Companion of the Queen's Service Order (QSO).

McClay was the chairman for Keep New Zealand Beautiful until July 2009. He has been involved in a number of other charities, including the New Zealand Spinal Trust, World Vision, Heart Children New Zealand, Variety, the Children's Charity and For the Sake of Children.

In March 2010, he was charged with misuse of taxpayer-subsidised flights. In August the same year, he pleaded guilty. He repaid the two charities that he had defrauded, Keep New Zealand Beautiful and World Vision. He was convicted and given a sentence of 300 hours of community work. In addition, he was stripped of his travel benefits by the Parliamentary Services Commission.

McClay died on 7 November 2025, at the age of 80, after having cancer for five years.
