= Noel Scott =

New Zealand politician (1929–2018)

The Honourable Noel Scott QSO

5th Minister for Sport and Recreation
- In office 10 July 1990 – 2 November 1990
- Prime Minister: Geoffrey Palmer; Mike Moore
- Preceded by: Peter Tapsell
- Succeeded by: John Banks

Member of the New Zealand Parliament for Tongariro
- In office 1984–1990
- Preceded by: Electorate established
- Succeeded by: Ian Peters

Personal details
- Born: 15 December 1929 Auckland
- Died: 25 February 2018 (aged 88)
- Party: Labour Party

Noel Scott QSO (15 December 1929 – 25 February 2018) was a New Zealand politician of the Labour Party.

== Biography ==
New Zealand Parliament
Years	Term	Electorate	Party
1984–1987	41st	Tongariro	Labour
1987–1990	42nd	Tongariro	Labour

Before entering politics, Scott was the foundation principal of Makoura College in Masterton. Scott unsuccessfully contested the Tarawera electorate in 1981. He represented the electorate of Tongariro in Parliament from 1984 to 1990, when he was defeated by Ian Peters, one of a number of losses contributing to the fall of the Fourth Labour Government.

Scott served as a Minister at the close of the Fourth Labour Government in a number of roles including as Minister for Sport and Recreation and Associate Minister of Education.

In the 2002 Queen's Birthday and Golden Jubilee Honours, Scott was appointed a Companion of the Queen's Service Order for public services.

Scott died on 25 February 2018 at the age of 88.

Political offices
Preceded by Peter Tapsell	Minister for Sport and Recreation; 1990	Succeeded by John Banks
New Zealand Parliament
New constituency	Member of Parliament for Tongariro; 1984–1990	Succeeded by Ian Peters
