= Rona Stevenson =

New Zealand politician (1911–1988)

New Zealand Parliament
Years	Term	Electorate	Party
1963–1966	34th	Taupo	National
1966–1969	35th	Taupo	National
1969–1972	36th	Taupo	National

Rona Miriel Stevenson MBE JP (13 February 1911 – 4 September 1988) was a New Zealand politician of the National Party.

Born in Wellington in 1911, she served on the executives of the Women's Division of Federated Farmers, the YWCA and the Presbyterian Church.

She represented the Taupo electorate from 1963 to 1972, when she retired. In the 1966 election, she narrowly beat (by 258 votes) Labour's Barry Gustafson. The Taupo seat was a marginal one and the women's section of the National Party raised a large sum of money to ensure her re-election. Also, in 1966 she also called for the names of women in 'so-called rape cases' to have their names published on the grounds that they may have been provocative, a move that may not have gained her support from women voters.

Stevenson was appointed a Member of the Order of the British Empire, for services to the community, in the 1976 Queen's Birthday Honours. She died on 4 September 1988, and her ashes were buried at Taupo Public Cemetery.
