= Waikaremoana (electorate) =

Waikaremoana is a former New Zealand Parliamentary electorate, from 1984 to 1996. During the four terms of the electorate's existence, it was held by National's Roger McClay.

== Population centres ==
The 1981 census had shown that the North Island had experienced further population growth, and three additional general seats were created through the 1983 electoral redistribution, bringing the total number of electorates to 95. The South Island had, for the first time, experienced a population loss, but its number of general electorates was fixed at 25 since the 1967 electoral redistribution. More of the South Island population was moving to Christchurch, and two electorates were abolished, while two electorates were recreated. In the North Island, six electorates were newly created (including Waikaremoana), three electorates were recreated, and six electorates were abolished. These changes came into effect in the 1984 election.

== History ==
Roger McClay was the Waikaremoana electorate's representative from 1984; McClay had since the 1981 election represented the Taupo electorate. He retired from politics at the 1996 election. The Waikaremoana electorate was abolished in 1996, the first mixed-member proportional (MMP) election.

=== Members of Parliament ===
Key

National

Election	Winner
1984 election	Roger McClay
1987 election	Roger McClay
1990 election	Roger McClay
1993 election	Roger McClay
Electorate abolished in 1996; see Taupo
