= Daniel Eb =

New Zealand politician

Daniel Eb MP

6th Deputy leader of the Opportunity Party
- Incumbent
- Assumed office March 2026
- Preceded by: Natalia Albert

Member of the New Zealand Parliament for Opportunity party list
- Incumbent
- Assumed office 7 November 2026

Personal details
- Born: 1986 or 1987 (age 38–39) South Africa
- Party: Opportunity

Daniel Eb (born 1986 or 1987) is a New Zealand politician and deputy leader of the Opportunity Party. He was elected to the New Zealand House of Representatives at the 2026 New Zealand general election from the Opportunity Party list.

== Early life ==
Eb was born in South Africa, and spent his childhood in Northland. He joined the New Zealand Territorial Force at the age of 20. He is the founder of public relations agency Dirt Road Communications, and of Open Farms. In July 2021, he was awarded a Nuffield scholarship to research domestic food justice and social license.

== Political career ==
New Zealand Parliament
Years	Term	Electorate	List	Party
2026–present	55th	List	2	Opportunity

Eb applied for the role of party leader, but was offered the deputy's position instead.

In March 2026, Eb was announced as the Opportunity Party deputy leader and candidate for Kaipara ki Mahurangi. He was placed second on the party list. During the 2026 New Zealand general election held on 7 November, Eb came sixth place in Kaipara ki Mahurangi with 1,381 votes, based on preliminary results. He was elected to the New Zealand Parliament on the party list.

== Personal life ==
In the lead up to the 2026 General Election, Eb revealed that he would likely vote for the National Party if he couldn't vote for Opportunity, and that he had previously been a National voter, before voting for other parties including the Greens.
