= Opportunity Party (New Zealand) =

Political party in New Zealand

- Abbreviation: Opportunity; TOP; OPP
- Leader: Qiulae Wong
- General Secretary: Hayden Cargo
- Deputy Leader: Daniel Eb
- Founder: Gareth Morgan
- Founded: 4 November 2016; 10 years ago
- Headquarters: 341 New North Road, Kingsland, Auckland
- Youth wing: Young Opportunity
- Ideology: Radical centrism Environmentalism; Social liberalism
- Political position: Centre
- Colours: Teal
- Slogan: The courage to change.
- MPs in the House of Representatives: 0 / 123

Website
- opportunity.org.nz

The Opportunity Party, formerly known as the Opportunities Party (TOP), is a centrist political party in New Zealand. It was founded in 2016 by economist and philanthropist Gareth Morgan. The party is based on the idea of evidence-based policy and being located in the political centre. It has contested three elections, and provisionally won seven seats in the election of 2026.

The party received 2.4% of the party vote in the 2017 general election (after which Morgan resigned from the leadership), then 1.5% in the 2020 general election. It won an elected office for the first time in the 2022 local elections, with one member elected to the Featherston Community Board in the South Wairarapa District. It received 2.2% of the party vote in the 2023 general election, after which party leader Raf Manji stepped down.

In November 2025, businesswoman Qiulae Wong was announced as the party's new leader after a period of searching, and the party was rebranded to the Opportunity Party with a set of updated policy priorities. During the 2026 general election, Opportunity won 5.96% of the party vote based on preliminary results, giving it seven seats.

== History ==
=== Formation ===
The Opportunities Party was founded by economist and philanthropist Gareth Morgan, who launched it on 4 November 2016. On 10 January 2017 the party announced that it had 2,000 members and was applying for registration. It was registered by the Electoral Commission on 6 March 2017.

The party's chief of staff Geoff Simmons contested the Mount Albert by-election on 25 February 2017. The party was criticised by David Seymour during the by-election for offering free bus trips for voters, which he asserted breached the Electoral Act. The Electoral Commission cleared TOP of any wrongdoing. Simmons received 623 votes (4.56% of the total vote), placing him third.

=== 2017 general election ===
Logo circa 2017

In May 2017, Morgan announced the party's first candidates for the 2017 general election, and announced further candidates in the following months, including former Green Party candidate Teresa Moore who joined Geoff Simmons as co-deputy leader. TOP's party list had 26 candidates, of which 21 were also contesting electorates.

TOP took TVNZ to court after being excluded from its televised election debates, but lost the case. Morgan faced controversy during the campaign for referring to Labour leader Jacinda Ardern as "lipstick on a pig", suggesting that the new leader had style but not substance. He also faced backlash when he criticised the public for being sad over the death of Ardern's cat. This backlash included an email from TOP candidate Jenny Condie, who said, "It is not merely Gareth's comments themselves – these are a reflection of the culture that exists within the party. There is a mismatch between our policies and our culture: between what we say we want to accomplish and how we actually behave." In response, Morgan told Condie to resign from the party.

TOP gained 2.4% of the vote, winning no parliamentary seats. Morgan vowed to continue fighting for a "fairer New Zealand" and maintained that TOP was not a failure as it was the fifth most popular party.

==== Post-election events ====
In December 2017, Morgan, Simmons and two candidates resigned from their roles. Morgan said the party would contest the 2020 election but he would not lead it. The following week, candidates Jessica Hammond Doube and Jenny Condie launched a splinter group from TOP with the placeholder name "Next Big Thing". They both attributed their low list rankings to their having raised questions over Morgan's controversial remarks during the election campaign. Condie would become a councillor for Wellington in 2019, while Jessica Hammond would return to TOP for the 2020 election, after a culture shift within the party during its rebuilding phase.

On 9 July 2018, Morgan announced that the party board had decided to cancel the party's registration as it lacked the time and resources to contest the 2020 election. In late July, Morgan and the board announced that he would reconsider the decision after receiving expressions of interest from people sympathetic to the party's goals. Morgan also indicated in a Facebook post that he was willing to fund candidates and leaders sympathetic to the goals of the party.

In August 2018, the party appointed a new board and Simmons was appointed interim leader. The new team embarked on a "Listening Tour" across the country to gauge supporter reaction and interest. In December 2018, an internal leadership election was conducted, with candidates for leader being Simmons, Donna Pokere-Phillips, Amy Stevens, Anthony Singh, and Jessica Hammond-Doube. An election was also held for the member-representative to the board. Simmons was elected leader and Pokere-Phillips the member representative.

=== 2020 general election ===
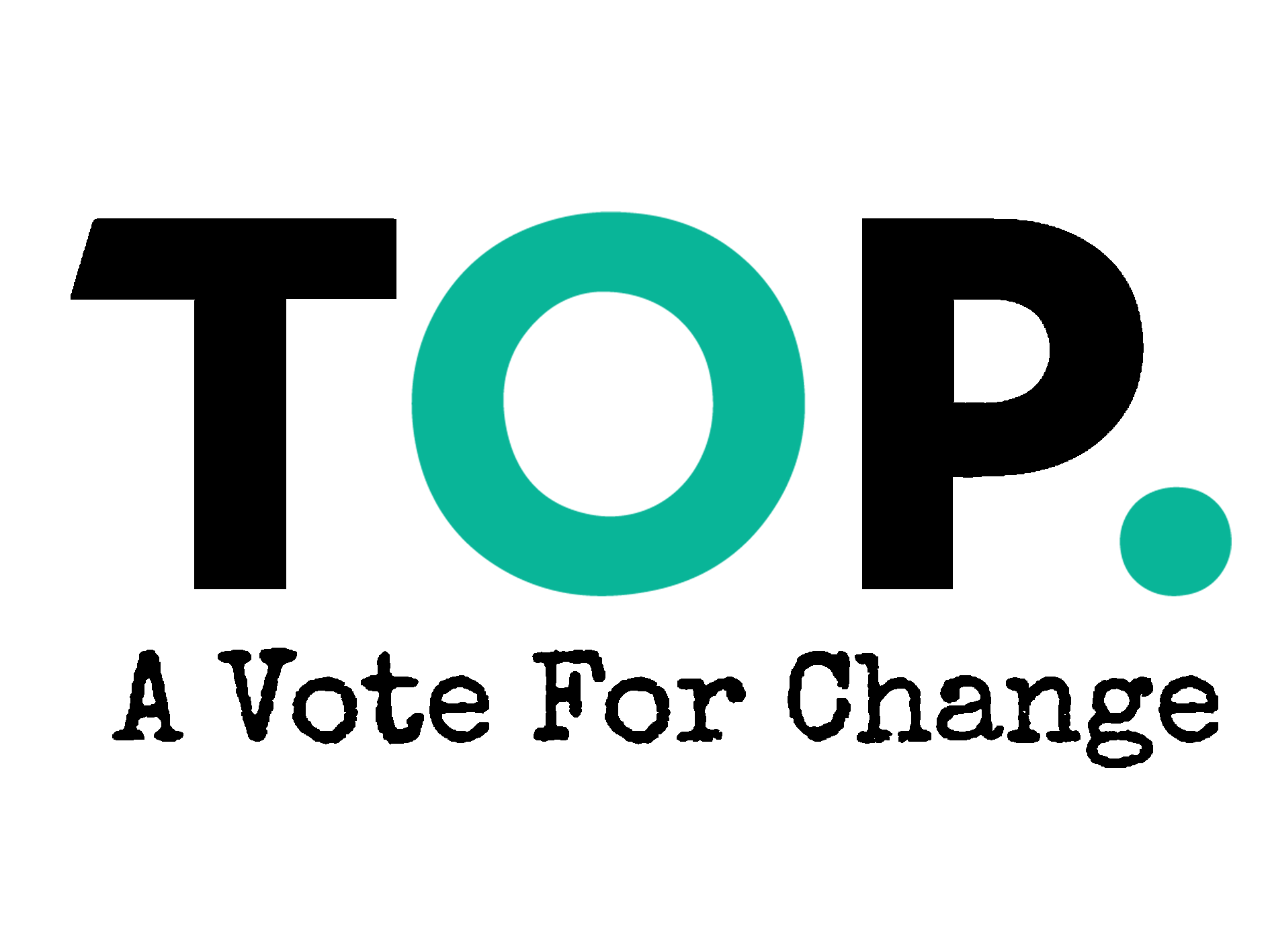
Logo circa 2020

After gathering enough support to restart the party and continuing to register with the Electorate Commission, a rebrand and relaunch was held in October 2019. In the brand launch speech, Simmons called for a universal basic income and advances in environment and housing, and to "break the Labour / National duopoly".

TOP nominated candidates in multiple electorates. The Ōhāriu electorate was a particular focus: their Ōhāriu candidate Jessica Hammond Doube said that TOP intended to pour resources into that campaign, as it was the only seat that the party believed it could win. She polled third with 4,443 votes, 18,494 behind the winner, the incumbent Greg O'Connor. Simmons contested Rongotai and came fourth with 3,387 electorate votes out of 45,649. At the beginning of his campaign he misspelt the electorate name as "Rongatai" in his advertising. In July 2020, TOP's Auckland Central candidate, Auckland café owner Joshua Love, left the party following a dispute over his conduct and campaign activities. A warning letter from party secretary Ray McKeown raised concerns about compliance with Electoral Act requirements for candidate advertising and Love's behaviour towards party members. An unnamed TOP board member alleged that Love had attended a meeting while hungover and behaved aggressively and confrontationally. Love disputed that account, while apologising for making the board member feel unsafe. Shortly after his departure, an unidentified 20-year-old woman told Stuff that Love had asked her to send him naked photographs after she contacted him to offer support. Love subsequently stood in Auckland Central as an independent, and TOP selected former New Zealand First MP Tuariki Delamere as its replacement candidate.

TOP won 43,449 party votes, 1.5% of the total. Simmons resigned as leader after preliminary results were released, and Shai Navot became interim leader. On 27 January 2022, former Christchurch City Councillor and independent candidate for Ilam, Raf Manji, was announced as the new leader.

=== 2022 local elections ===
The party fielded four candidates in the 2022 local elections, the first time they had contested local elections. They had their first elected representative in John Dennison, who won a seat on the Featherston Community Board in the South Wairarapa District.

=== 2023 general election ===
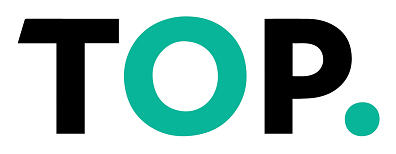
Logo circa 2023

As of May 2023, TOP was averaging around 1–2% in opinion polls. Its leader, Raf Manji, said that realistically it would need to win the Ilam electorate to enter Parliament in the 2023 election. He had contested the electorate as an independent in 2017, coming second. On 4 August 2023, TOP announced their party list where they put forward 13 electorate candidates throughout New Zealand, and announced Natalia Albert as the new deputy leader.

TOP received 2.22% of the party vote. It did not win any electorates or meet the five percent threshold needed to enter Parliament. Manji came second in Ilam, with 10,863 votes, against National candidate Hamish Campbell's 18,693 votes. Manji stepped down as leader in December 2023. In August 2025 the party's general manager, former Labour MP and minister Iain Lees-Galloway, advertised the party leader role on employment website SEEK.

=== 2026 general election ===
In November 2025 the party chose Qiulae 'Q' Wong to be their new leader. Wong used to work at KPMG as an adviser on sustainable business, and is the former director of the New Zealand branch of B-Lab. The party announced it would contest the 2026 general election with a range of policies that include reducing house prices through a land value tax, and introducing a "Citizen's Voice", consisting of citizens' assemblies for certain major issues. On 16 February, general manager Iain Lees-Galloway announced that the party would run candidates in 30 electorates. Wong confirmed she would contest the Mount Albert electorate.

==== Bottom lines ====
On 29 September 2026, Qiulae Wong announced the party's five bottom lines, saying "bottom lines were minimum commitments designed to deliver change beyond a single term". The bottom lines are:

- Increasing the power of the Commerce Commission to tackle excessive supermarket prices
- Regulating lobbying and capping political donations to "clean up politics"
- A 10-year health plan
- Banning of bottom trawling
- Recommitting to emissions obligations under the Paris Agreement

Wong later said that honouring Te Tiriti o Waitangi was also a non-negotiable.

==== Key policies ====
The party proposes three main reforms of the taxation system: introducing a citizen's income, a land value tax (LVT), and compulsory membership in the KiwiSaver savings scheme. The citizen's income (similar to a UBI) would entail almost all adults getting paid $370 a week, although people earning more than NZ$350,000 a year would not be able to access it. The LVT contains exemptions and deferrals for groups such as farmers and retirees.

The citizen's income would replace many state welfare benefits, including the unemployment benefit. The party says this will save millions in bureaucracy and will give people dignity. However, the figure of NZ$370 a week has been criticised as a "poverty-level payment" and as an amount that "will not be enough for most people to survive on". The party estimates that 70% of New Zealanders would be net positive in this scenario, 20% net neutral, and 10% would end up paying more tax. The party believes that this would disincentivize speculation and land banking in the property market, and would redirect wealth to productive parts of the economy.

The party also want to boost renewable energy through long-term cross-party support, increasing it by 30GW before 2050; and would merge energy regulatory agencies and consolidate the distributors down to eight.

During the party's State of the Nation address in Auckland on 21 February 2026, Wong announced that the party would also campaign on promoting national unity, and banning bottom trawling. In early July 2026, the party released its economic policy, which included investing in technology and commerce, strengthening the Commerce Commission's powers and forgiving student loan interest in order to draw back emigrant New Zealanders.

In August 2026, the party announced a policy to "clean up politics". This would involve regulating lobbying with a national database, implementing a year-long cooldown period before ministers and officials can become lobbyists, and setting stricter rules around conduct. The party would also reform political donations by introducing a cap of $30,000 per donor for a party in each electoral cycle and lowering the threshold of disclosing the donor to $1,000. The party claims that the donor cap is the figure recommended by the Independent Electoral Review.

In mid-September 2026, Opportunity released its climate change policy, which included introducing a methane emissions trading scheme and investing $5 billion in climate adaptation.

==== Polling ====
Opinion polls during the campaign showed support for the party rising above 5% – the threshold for entering parliament – for the first time. In August 2026, the party's support reached highs of 8% and peaked at 9.5% in one Roy Morgan poll, but dropped back to 4.5% in September's Taxpayers Union Poll. Between August 2026 and the beginning of advanced voting over 90% of major polls had Opportunity over the 5% threshold.

The party is open to a coalition with either Labour or National. Wong subsequently qualified her party's position by stating that it would not support a government that had Winston Peters as foreign minister. Wong said they would first negotiate with whichever party received the most seats, after earlier saying it would be the party with the most votes. Opportunity may enter a formal coalition, or may provide confidence and supply, or sit on the crossbenches. On 27 July, the National Party ruled out working with Opportunity, with its leader Christopher Luxon saying, "We wouldn't be in business with people who want to increase taxes."

In a poll conducted from 3 July to 13 August 2026, Talbot Mills tracked where the party's supporters came from in terms of how they voted at the 2023 general election, finding that about a third came from the left and about a third from the right, while a quarter had supported the party in that election.

==== Election results ====
During the 2026 general election held on 7 November, Opportunity gained 5.96% of the popular vote and won seven seats based on preliminary results, meeting the five percent party vote threshold needed to enter Parliament. This marked the first time in 30 years since the introduction of the Mixed Member Proportional system that a new party had entered the New Zealand Parliament without a sitting Member of Parliament leaving an existing party. Qiulae Wong said that Opportunity was open to a range of supporting options including coalition, confidence and supply and crossbench agreements.

In the period before the declaration of final results on 27 November, several parties and figures have sought to court Opportunity as coalition partners. On 8 November, Greens co-leader Chlöe Swarbrick urged Opportunity to "choose the side of those who have the greatest policy alignment, and I believe the greatest values alignment" in order to change the government. While the National Party had earlier ruled out forming a coalition with Opportunity due to disagreements on tax policies, Christopher Luxon subsequently expressed interest in building a relationship with Wong and her party in order to find common ground on several issues including artificial intelligence, infrastructure and social media bans. Luxon also said it was unlikely that National would require Opportunity's support to remain in government due to the former's coalition agreements with ACT and New Zealand First. While New Zealand First leader Winston Peters had earlier ruled out working with Opportunity, the party's deputy leader Shane Jones expressed interest in finding common ground on certain issues with Opportunity but stated that his party had not changed its tune towards Opportunity. Wong had earlier ruled out working with any government with Peters as Foreign Minister. ACT leader David Seymour and ACT MP Paul Henry have expressed openness to the National-led coalition government working with Opportunity as a means of keeping Labour out of government.

== Electoral results ==
=== National ===
Election	Leader	Votes	%	Seats	+/–	Position	Status
2017	Gareth Morgan	63,261	2.4%	0 / 120	Steady	▲6th	No seats
2020	Geoff Simmons	43,449	1.5%	0 / 120	Steady	6th	No seats
2023	Raf Manji	63,330	2.2%	0 / 123	Steady	▼7th	No seats
2026	Qiulae Wong	TBD	TBD	7 / 131	▲7	▲6th	TBD

=== Local ===
Election	# of candidates					Winning candidates				
Election	Mayor	Local council	Board	Regional council	Total	Mayor	Local council	Board	Regional council	Total
2022	0	3	1	0	4		0 / 3	1 / 1		1 / 4 25%
2025	no candidates									

== Officeholders ==
=== Leader ===
#	Name	Image	Assumed office	Left office	Notes
1	Gareth Morgan		4 November 2016	14 December 2017	Party founder
2	Geoff Simmons		18 August 2018	3 November 2020	
-	Shai Navot		3 November 2020	27 January 2022	Interim leader
3	Raf Manji		27 January 2022	3 December 2023	Former Christchurch City councillor. Came second as an independent in Ilam in 2017.
4	Qiulae Wong		16 November 2025	present	

=== Deputy leader ===
#	Name	Assumed office	Left office	Notes
1	Geoff Simmons	24 May 2017	14 December 2017	
2	Teresa Moore	28 August 2017	9 July 2018	Appointed co-deputy leader along with Simmons
3	Shai Navot	30 April 2020	3 November 2020	Became leader
3	Shai Navot	3 March 2023	c. 4 August 2023	Co-deputy leaders
4	Jessica Hammond	3 March 2023	c. 4 August 2023	Co-deputy leaders
(3)	Shai Navot	3 March 2023	c. 4 August 2023	Co-deputy leaders
5	Natalia Albert	4 August 2023	3 December 2023	Appointed following 2023 candidate list announcement
6	Daniel Eb	March 2026	present	

== Notable candidates ==
- Tuariki Delamere (born 1951), former Minister of Immigration, Minister of Pacific Island Affairs, Associate Minister of Finance, and Associate Minister of Health. Delamere was a candidate for the 2020 election campaign.
- Abe Gray (born 1982), founder of the Whakamana Cannabis Museum, high-profile cannabis activist and protester for almost two decades. Gray has been a candidate from 2017 to the present.
- Mika Haka (born 1962), Māori singer, performance artist, actor, filmmaker, TV producer and comedian. Haka was a candidate for the 2017 election campaign.
- Jessica Hammond (born 1978/1979), public servant, politician, playwright, and blogger. Hammond has been a candidate from 2017 to the present.
- Joshua Love (1991–2025), hospitality entrepreneur. Selected as a candidate in 2020 but resigned candidacy months before the election.
