= Results of the 2017 New Zealand general election =

The following is a detailed results break down of the 2017 New Zealand general election, which was held on 23 September 2017.

Preliminary results were gradually released after polling booths closed at 19:00 (NZST) on 23 September. The preliminary count only includes advance ordinary and election-day ordinary votes; it does not include any special votes. Special votes include votes from those who enrolled after the deadline of 23 August, those who voted outside their electorate (this includes all overseas votes), hospital votes, and those voters enrolled on the unpublished roll.

All voting papers, counterfoils and electoral rolls are returned to the electorate's returning officer for a mandatory recount; this also includes approving and counting any special votes, and compiling a master roll to ensure no voter has voted more than once. Official results, including all recounted ordinary votes and special votes, are due to be released by 14:00 on Saturday 7 October 2017.

Parties and candidates have three working days after the release of the official results to apply for a judicial recount. These recounts take place under the auspices of a District Court judge (the Chief District Court Judge in case of a nationwide recount), and may delay the return of the election writ by a few days.

Party vote percentage
1. National (44.5%)
2. Labour (36.9%)
3. NZ First (7.20%)
4. Green (6.27%)
5. Opportunities (2.44%)
6. Māori (1.18%)
7. ACT (0.50%)
8. Legalise Cannabis (0.31%)
9. Conservative (0.24%)
10. Other (0.52%)

The House of Representatives after the election, showing the resulting Labour-NZ First coalition supported by the Greens.

== Party vote ==
Summary of the 23 September 2017 election for the House of Representatives
Party	Party vote			Electorate vote			Seats			
Party	Votes	%	Change (pp)	Votes	%	Change (pp)	List	Electorate	Total	+/-
National	1,152,075	44.45	▼2.59	1,114,367	44.05	▼2.0	15	41	56	▼4
Labour	956,184	36.89	▲11.76	958,155	37.88	▲3.75	17	29	46	▲14
NZ First	186,706	7.20	▼1.46	137,816	5.45	▲2.32	9	0	9	▼2
Green	162,443	6.27	▼4.43	174,725	6.91	▼0.15	8	0	8	▼6
ACT	13,075	0.50	▼0.19	25,471	1.01	▼0.17	0	1	1	Steady
Opportunities	63,261	2.44	new	26,034	1.03	new	0	0	0	new
Māori Party	30,580	1.18	▼0.14	53,247	2.11	▲0.32	0	0	0	▼2
Legalise Cannabis	8,075	0.31	▼0.14	4,144	0.16	▼0.05	0	0	0	Steady
Conservative	6,253	0.24	▼3.75	6,115	0.24	▼3.21	0	0	0	Steady
Mana	3,642	0.14	▼1.28 (Note: Contested the 2014 election as part of Internet Mana.)	8,196	0.32	▼1.26	0	0	0	Steady
Ban 1080	3,005	0.12	▼0.10	3,003	0.12	▼0.07	0	0	0	Steady
People's Party	1,890	0.07	new	—	—	—	0	0	0	new
United Future	1,782	0.07	▼0.15	1,285	0.05	▼0.58	0	0	0	▼1
Outdoors	1,620	0.06	new	1,357	0.05	new	0	0	0	new
Democrats	806	0.03	▼0.04	1,794	0.20	▼0.13	0	0	0	Steady
Internet	499	0.02	▼1.40	—	—	▼1.58	0	0	0	Steady
Unregistered Parties	—	—	—	1,073	0.04	Steady	—	0	0	Steady
Independent	—	—	—	12,749	0.50	▲0.34	—	0	0	Steady
Valid votes	2,591,896	98.54	▲0.20	2,529,531	96.17	▲0.20				
Informal votes	10,793	0.41	▼0.03	30,554	1.16	▲0.02				
Disallowed votes	27,484	1.04	▼0.18	70,088	2.66	▼0.23				
Below electoral threshold	121,413	4.62	—	—	—	—				
Total	2,630,173	100		2,630,173	100		49	71	120	▼1
Eligible voters and Turnout	3,298,009	79.75	▲1.85	3,298,009	79.75	▲1.85				

Popular Vote
National	44.45%
Labour	36.89%
NZ First	7.20%
Green	6.27%
Opportunities	2.24%
Māori	1.18%
ACT	0.50%
Others	1.07%

Parliament seats
National	46.67%
Labour	38.33%
NZ First	7.50%
Green	6.67%
ACT	0.83%

=== Comparison of preliminary and official results ===
Party	Preliminary (23 September)			Official (7 October)			Difference	
Party	Votes	%	Seats	Votes	%	Seats	%	Seats
National	998,813	46.03	58	1,152,075	44.45	56	−1.58	−2
Labour	776,556	35.79	45	956,184	36.89	46	+1.10	+1
NZ First	162,988	7.51	9	186,706	7.20	9	−0.31	0
Green	126,995	5.85	7	162,443	6.27	8	+0.42	+1
ACT	10,959	0.51	1	13,075	0.50	1	−0.01	0
Opportunities	47,980	2.21	0	63,261	2.44	0	+0.23	
Māori Party	23,452	1.08	0	30,580	1.18	0	+0.10	0
Legalise Cannabis	5,847	0.27	0					
Conservative	5,316	0.24	0					
Mana	2,775	0.13	0					
Ban 1080	2,439	0.11	0					
People's Party	1,629	0.08	0					
United Future	1,469	0.07	0					
Outdoors	1,332	0.06	0					
Democrats	732	0.03	0					
Internet	463	0.02	0					
total	2,169,802	100.00	120		100.00			

== Electorate results ==
Party affiliation of winning electorate candidates.

At the 2014 general elections, four electorates were won by candidates with a margin of fewer than 1,000 votes: Auckland Central, Hutt South, Ōhāriu and Te Tai Tokerau.

Hamilton West is considered to be New Zealand's bellwether seat. Since the formation of the electorate in 1969, the winning candidate has been from the party that has gone on to form the government, with the exception of 1993 when it elected a Labour MP while the National went on to form the government (albeit with a one-seat majority). Along with Hamilton West, Maungakiekie and Rotorua have been bellwethers in the MMP era, swinging with the government at every election since 1996.

The table below shows the results of the 2017 general election:

Key:

National	Labour	Green	NZ First	Opportunities
ACT	United Future	Māori Party	Mana	Independent

Electorate results of the 2017 New Zealand general election
Electorate	Incumbent	Winner	Majority	Runner up	Third place
Auckland Central	Nikki Kaye		1,581	Helen White	Denise Roche
Bay of Plenty	Todd Muller		13,996	Angie Warren-Clark	Lester Gray
Botany	Jami-Lee Ross		12,839	Tofik Mamedov	Julie Zhu
Christchurch Central	Nicky Wagner	Duncan Webb	2,871	Nicky Wagner	Peter Richardson
Christchurch East	Poto Williams		7,480	Jo Hayes	Cathy Sweet
Clutha-Southland	Todd Barclay	Hamish Walker	14,354	Cherie Chapman	Mark Patterson
Coromandel	Scott Simpson		14,326	Nathaniel Blomfield	Scott Summerfield
Dunedin North	David Clark		11,754	Michael Woodhouse	Niki Bould
Dunedin South	Clare Curran		8,717	Matt Gregory	Shane Gallagher
East Coast	Anne Tolley		4,807	Kiri Allan	Julian Tilley
East Coast Bays	Murray McCully	Erica Stanford	16,290	Naisi Chen	Nicholas Mayne
Epsom	David Seymour		5,519	Paul Goldsmith	David Parker
Hamilton East	David Bennett		5,810	Jamie Strange	Sam Taylor
Hamilton West	Tim Macindoe		7,731	Gaurav Sharma	Jo Wrigley
Helensville	Vacant (Note: Was John Key until his resignation on 14 April 2017.)	Chris Penk	14,608	Kurt Taogaga	Hayley Holt
Hunua	Andrew Bayly		19,443	Baljit Kaur	Jon Reeves
Hutt South	Trevor Mallard (Note: Mallard did not re-contest the electorate this election, instead contesting the party list only.)	Chris Bishop	1,530	Ginny Andersen	Virginia Horrocks
Ilam	Gerry Brownlee		8,256	Raf Manji	Anthony Rimell
Invercargill	Sarah Dowie		5,579	Liz Craig	Ria Bond
Kaikoura	Stuart Smith		10,553	Janette Walker	Jamie Arbuckle
Kelston	Carmel Sepuloni		7,269	Bala Beeram	Nicola Smith
Mana	Kris Faafoi		10,980	Euon Murrell	Jan Logie
Māngere	William Sio		14,597	Agnes Loheni	Elaine Dyett
Manukau East	Jenny Salesa		12,589	Kanwaljit Singh Bakshi	William Flesher
Manurewa	Louisa Wall		8,374	Katrina Bungard	John Hall
Maungakiekie	Sam Lotu-Iiga	Denise Lee	2,157	Priyanca Radhakrishnan	Chlöe Swarbrick
Mount Albert	Jacinda Ardern		15,264	Melissa Lee	Julie Anne Genter
Mount Roskill	Michael Wood		6,898	Parmjeet Parmar	Ricardo Menéndez March
Napier	Stuart Nash		5,220	David Elliott	Damon Rusden
Nelson	Nick Smith		4,283	Rachel Boyack	Matt Lawrey
New Lynn	David Cunliffe	Deborah Russell	2,825	Paulo Garcia	Leilani Tamu
New Plymouth	Jonathan Young		7,733	Corie Haddock	Murray Chong
North Shore	Maggie Barry		12,716	Romy Udanga	Josh Hubbard
Northcote	Jonathan Coleman		6,210	Shanan Halbert	Rebekah Jaung
Northland	Winston Peters	Matt King	1,389	Winston Peters	Willow-Jean Prime
Ōhāriu	Peter Dunne	Greg O'Connor	1,051	Brett Hudson	Jessica Hammond Doube
Ōtaki	Nathan Guy		6,156	Rob McCann	Sam Ferguson
Pakuranga	Maurice Williamson	Simeon Brown	14,886	Barry Kirker	Suzanne Kelly
Palmerston North	Iain Lees-Galloway		6,392	Adrienne Pierce	Darroch Ball
Papakura	Judith Collins		7,486	Jesse Pabla	Toa Greening
Port Hills	Ruth Dyson		7,916	Nuk Korako	Eugenie Sage
Rangitata	Jo Goodhew	Andrew Falloon	6,331	Jo Luxton	Olly Wilson
Rangitīkei	Ian McKelvie		10,290	Heather Warren	Rob Stevenson
Rimutaka	Chris Hipkins		8,609	Carolyn O'Fallon	Stefan Grand-Meyer
Rodney	Mark Mitchell		19,561	Marja Lubeck	Tracey Martin
Rongotai	Annette King	Paul Eagle	10,900	Chris Finlayson	Teall Crossen
Rotorua	Todd McClay		7,901	Ben Sandford	Fletcher Tabuteau
Selwyn	Amy Adams		19,639	Tony Condon	Chrys Horn
Tāmaki	Simon O'Connor		15,402	Sam McDonald	Richard Leckinger
Taranaki-King Country	Barbara Kuriger		15,259	Hilary Humphrey	Robert Moore
Taupō	Louise Upston		14,335	Al'a Al-Bustanji	Julie Sandilands
Tauranga	Simon Bridges		11,252	Jan Tinetti	Clayton Mitchell
Te Atatū	Phil Twyford		3,184	Alfred Ngaro	David Wilson
Tukituki	Craig Foss	Lawrence Yule	2,813	Anna Lorck	Joe Kairau
Upper Harbour	Paula Bennett		9,556	Jin An	James Goodhue
Waikato	Lindsay Tisch	Tim van de Molen	15,452	Brooke Loader	Stu Husband
Waimakariri	Matt Doocey		10,766	Dan Rosewarne	Nikki Berry
Wairarapa	Alastair Scott		2,872	Kieran McAnulty	Ron Mark
Waitaki	Jacqui Dean		12,816	Zélie Allan	Pat Wall
Wellington Central	Grant Robertson		9,963	Nicola Willis	James Shaw
West Coast-Tasman	Damien O'Connor		5,593	Maureen Pugh	Kate Fulton
Whanganui	Chester Borrows	Harete Hipango	1,706	Steph Lewis	Reginald Skipworth
Whangarei	Shane Reti		10,967	Tony Savage	Shane Jones
Wigram	Megan Woods		4,594	David Hiatt	Richard Wesley
Māori electorates
Hauraki-Waikato	Nanaia Mahuta		9,223	Rahui Papa	n/a
Ikaroa-Rāwhiti	Meka Whaitiri		4,210	Marama Fox	Elizabeth Kerekere
Tāmaki Makaurau	Peeni Henare		3,809	Shane Taurima	Marama Davidson
Te Tai Hauāuru	Adrian Rurawhe		1,039	Howie Tamati	Jack McDonald
Te Tai Tokerau	Kelvin Davis		4,807	Hone Harawira	Godfrey Rudolph
Te Tai Tonga	Rino Tirikatene		4,676	Metiria Turei	Mei Reedy-Taare
Waiariki	Te Ururoa Flavell	Tāmati Coffey	1,719	Te Ururoa Flavell	n/a

== Party vote by electorate ==
Highest polling party in each electorate.

The following is a breakdown of the party vote received in each electorate. Only parties which received at least one percent of the nationwide party vote are listed.

Electorate	National	Labour	NZ First	Green	TOP	Māori	Total	Government	Opposition
Auckland Central	39.23	37.79	3.88	13.90	3.15	0.41		55.57	40.29
Bay of Plenty	54.62	25.51	10.77	4.03	3.18	0.50		40.30	55.10
Botany	61.02	29.27	4.59	2.39	0.82	0.56		36.26	61.61
Christchurch Central	39.06	40.70	5.23	9.77	3.49	0.39		55.71	39.50
Christchurch East	35.47	47.26	6.32	6.75	2.32	0.38		60.33	35.81
Clutha-Southland	59.26	24.23	7.84	4.47	2.42	0.26		36.54	59.64
Coromandel	51.23	27.79	12.26	5.31	1.71	0.24		45.37	51.63
Dunedin North	27.83	47.74	5.09	13.70	4.12	0.29		66.54	28.26
Dunedin South	35.62	48.24	6.60	5.94	2.43	0.21		60.78	35.91
East Coast	44.24	36.80	9.94	4.60	2.35	0.75		51.34	44.52
East Coast Bays	62.88	23.23	5.39	4.74	1.92	0.16		33.36	63.87
Epsom	58.63	24.54	3.15	8.36	2.67	0.32		36.05	60.41
Hamilton East	47.62	35.51	5.68	6.09	3.17	0.55		47.28	48.24
Hamilton West	46.49	36.77	7.70	4.31	2.66	0.63		48.78	46.90
Helensville	55.92	25.50	7.12	7.57	2.03	0.27		40.18	56.73
Hunua	62.95	22.27	8.57	2.99	1.48	0.25		33.83	63.67
Hutt South	41.71	40.43	5.54	7.29	3.46	0.41		53.27	42.16
Ilam	52.63	31.19	3.75	7.16	3.50	0.37		42.10	53.24
Invercargill	48.39	35.82	8.72	3.24	2.11	0.22		47.78	48.65
Kaikōura	52.83	29.25	8.99	4.96	2.18	0.23		43.20	53.21
Kelston	32.95	50.37	6.58	6.72	1.56	0.50		63.67	33.30
Mana	36.57	45.58	4.95	7.86	3.35	0.56		58.39	36.88
Māngere	17.34	71.04	5.16	2.71	0.68	2.04		78.90	17.46
Manukau East	22.95	65.68	5.74	2.23	0.70	1.49		73.65	23.21
Manurewa	28.76	58.85	6.63	2.48	0.74	1.11		67.95	29.03
Maungakiekie	40.96	43.65	5.11	5.89	2.20	0.81		54.61	41.60
Mount Albert	33.96	43.36	3.44	14.65	2.96	0.45		61.45	34.55
Mount Roskill	43.01	42.69	4.43	6.22	1.74	0.47		53.34	43.59
Napier	46.20	37.83	7.20	4.99	1.90	0.40		50.03	46.60
Nelson	39.31	41.56	6.51	7.51	3.27	0.22		55.59	39.64
New Lynn	41.79	42.68	6.10	6.19	1.48	0.35		54.96	42.22
New Plymouth	48.77	34.14	7.76	4.49	2.73	0.62		46.40	49.33
North Shore	57.83	26.08	5.27	6.63	2.40	0.26		37.98	58.76
Northcote	48.77	34.23	6.02	6.76	2.29	0.37		47.01	49.33
Northland	46.35	30.13	13.17	6.05	1.98	0.33		49.35	46.82
Ōhariu	45.28	35.45	3.72	9.62	4.16	0.46		48.78	45.88
Ōtaki	46.25	36.19	8.25	5.68	2.19	0.38		50.12	46.64
Pakuranga	61.86	24.78	6.62	3.74	1.22	0.35		35.14	62.62
Palmerston North	40.32	41.37	7.82	6.12	2.67	0.40		55.30	40.71
Papakura	51.27	33.53	8.79	2.83	1.20	0.64		45.15	51.84
Port Hills	40.70	39.40	4.83	10.29	3.42	0.33		54.52	41.06
Rangitata	53.03	33.58	6.02	3.29	2.18	0.19		43.08	53.54
Rangitīkei	51.83	28.93	10.38	4.40	2.27	0.45		43.71	52.29
Rimutaka	39.04	43.46	7.43	5.45	2.77	0.46		56.35	39.41
Rodney	59.65	23.35	8.73	4.60	1.78	0.23		36.68	60.51
Rongotai	28.11	44.41	3.66	17.82	4.64	0.50		65.89	28.45
Rotorua	48.33	32.30	9.90	4.14	2.71	1.26		46.33	48.66
Selwyn	59.11	26.16	5.55	5.32	2.57	0.17		37.02	59.56
Tāmaki	61.66	24.46	3.91	5.65	2.06	0.45		34.02	63.03
Taranaki-King Country	58.06	23.86	9.01	4.44	2.20	0.52		37.32	58.69
Taupō	53.94	28.98	9.02	3.44	2.28	0.65		41.44	54.42
Tauranga	52.86	26.79	11.29	3.90	3.20	0.53		41.98	53.46
Te Atatū	41.43	43.98	6.44	4.90	1.29	0.45		55.32	41.92
Tukituki	49.19	34.14	7.86	5.12	1.95	0.35		47.12	49.54
Upper Harbour	54.20	32.41	5.75	4.08	1.64	0.31		42.24	54.48
Waikato	58.69	24.18	10.10	3.05	1.86	0.43		37.33	59.33
Waimakariri	53.62	32.29	6.65	4.12	1.79	0.21		43.06	53.91
Wairarapa	48.80	32.08	10.33	4.82	2.03	0.52		47.23	49.20
Waitaki	53.97	30.17	6.59	5.30	2.58	0.18		42.06	54.21
Wellington Central	30.53	38.29	2.26	21.34	5.89	0.52		61.89	31.29
West Coast-Tasman	40.09	37.15	9.37	8.26	2.60	0.19		54.79	40.45
Whanganui	44.92	36.60	10.07	4.73	1.70	0.43		51.40	45.37
Whangarei	45.08	31.53	14.09	5.68	1.74	0.25		51.31	45.56
Wigram	41.21	41.39	5.95	6.70	2.87	0.40		54.04	41.65
Hauraki-Waikato	6.99	62.59	8.49	5.23	2.55	11.15		76.30	7.07
Ikaroa-Rāwhiti	4.87	65.53	7.25	4.92	2.01	13.16		77.70	4.99
Tāmaki Makaurau	6.61	59.96	9.63	7.31	2.34	11.08		76.90	6.77
Te Tai Hauāuru	6.62	59.14	7.35	6.61	2.89	15.13		73.11	6.71
Te Tai Tokerau	7.49	58.46	11.23	6.41	2.34	6.54		76.10	7.66
Te Tai Tonga	12.59	56.32	8.05	8.20	3.94	8.48		72.57	12.79
Waiariki	4.75	58.95	7.42	3.86	2.88	19.71		70.22	4.83

== List results ==
=== Successful list MPs ===
National	Labour	NZ First	Green
Bill English (01); David Carter (03); Steven Joyce (04); Chris Finlayson (09); Michael Woodhouse (10); Paul Goldsmith (18); Alfred Ngaro (20); Nicky Wagner (22); Brett Hudson (30); Melissa Lee (31); Kanwaljit Singh Bakshi (32); Jian Yang (33); Parmjeet Parmar (34); Jo Hayes (36); Nuk Korako (42)	Andrew Little (03); David Parker (10); Priyanca Radhakrishnan (12); Raymond Huo (13); Jan Tinetti (15); Willow-Jean Prime (17); Kiri Allan (21); Willie Jackson (22); Ginny Andersen (28); Jo Luxton (29); Liz Craig (31); Marja Lubeck (32); Trevor Mallard (33); Jamie Strange (36); Anahila Kanongata'a-Suisuiki (37); Kieran McAnulty (38); Angie Warren-Clark (39)	Winston Peters (01); Ron Mark (02); Tracey Martin (03); Fletcher Tabuteau (04); Darroch Ball (05); Clayton Mitchell (06); Mark Patterson (07); Shane Jones (08); Jenny Marcroft (09)	James Shaw (01); Marama Davidson (02); Julie Anne Genter (03); Eugenie Sage (04); Gareth Hughes (05); Jan Logie (06); Chlöe Swarbrick (07); Golriz Ghahraman (08)

=== Unsuccessful list candidates ===
National	Maureen Pugh, Nicola Willis, Agnes Loheni, Paulo Garcia, David Hiatt, Matt Gregory, Adrienne Pierce, David Elliott, Katrina Bungard, Bala Beeram, Carolyn O'Fallon, Euon Murrell, Sarah Jo Barley, Lisa Whyte, Linda Cooper, Dan Bidois, Rahul Sirigiri, Hadleigh Reid, Graham Collins
Labour	Helen White, Steph Lewis, Lemauga Lydia Sosene, Janette Walker, Anna Lorck, Romy Udanga, Rachel Boyack, Sarb Johal, Naisi Chen, Shanan Halbert, Dan Rosewarne, Jin An, Jesse Pabla, Hilary Humphrey, Tony Savage, Brooke Loader, Ben Sandford, Kurt Taogaga, Heather Warren, Sam McDonald, Cherie Chapman, Al'a Al-Bustanji, Baljit Kaur, Linsey Higgins, Barry Kirker, Tofik Mamedov, Michelle Lomax, Nathaniel Blomfield, Gaurav Sharma, Anthony Rimell, Tony Condon, Sarah Packer, Andy Begg, Corie Haddock
NZ First	Mahesh Bindra, Pita Paraone, Ria Bond, Denis O'Rourke, David Wilson, Richard Prosser, Jon Reeves, Stu Husband, Andy Foster, Melanie Mark-Shadbolt, Helen Peterson, Rob Stevenson, Lisa Close, Jamie Arbuckle, Joshua Hubbard, Talani Meikle, Peter Chan, Lester Gray, Anne Degia-Pala, Suzanne Kelly, Murray Chong, Jackie Farrelly, Toa Greening, Julian Paul, Shayne Wihongi, Romuald Rudzki, Reg Skipworth, Joe Kairau, Kym Koloni, Geoff Mills, Alexander Familton, Anne-Marie Andrews, Julian Tilley, William Flesher, Tane Apanui, John Hall, Warren Voight, Jane Johnston, Frank Edwards, Ilja Ruppeldt, Mataroa Paroro, Kerry Rushton, Alok Gupta, Andrew Littlejohn, Susan Sara, Ken Mahon, Lindy Palmer
Green	Mojo Mathers, Barry Coates, Jack McDonald, John Hart, Denise Roche, Hayley Holt, Teall Crossen, Teanau Tuiono, Leilani Tamu, Matt Lawrey, Elizabeth Kerekere, Chris Perley, Ricardo Menéndez March, Julie Zhu, Richard Leckinger, Thomas Nash, Sam Taylor, Kate Fulton, Tane Woodley, Jo Wrigley, Ash Holwell, Stefan Grand-Meyer, Robin McCandless, Niki Bould, Shane Gallagher, Scott Summerfield, Rochelle Surendran, Bridget Walsh, Rachael Goldsmith, Patrick Wall, James Goodhue, Richard Wesley, Guy Hunt, Elaine Dyett, Sam Ferguson, Richard Gillies, Emma-Leigh Hodge, Chrys Horn, Rebekah Jaung, David Lee, Nicholas Mayne, Robert Moore, Nicola Patrick, Peter Richardson, Godfrey Rudolph, Damon Rusden, Julie Sandilands, Raj Singh, Nicola Smith, Philippa Stevenson, Cathy Sweet
Opportunities	Gareth Morgan, Geoff Simmons, Teresa Moore, Buddy Mikaere, Olly Wilson, Donna Pokere-Phillips, Doug Hill, Piri-Hira Tukapua, Nicola Glenjarman, Mika Haka, Nicky Snoyink, Richard Warwick, Ted Faleauto Johnston, Abe Gray
Māori Party	Marama Fox, Te Ururoa Flavell, Rahui Papa, Shane Taurima, Mei Reedy-Taare, Howie Tāmati, Hinurewa Te Hau, Tuilagi Saipele Esera, John Kiria, Te Waka McLeod, Carrie Stoddart-Smith, Manase Lua, Wetex Kang, Tasha Hohaia, Esther Tofilau-Tevaga, Tina Porou, George Ngatai, Cinnamon Whitlock, Raewyn Bhana, Ngarangi Chapman, Wendy Biddle, Maryanne Marsters, Karen Williams, Amiria Te Whiu, Mele Pepa, Tae Moala Tu’inukuafe
ACT	Beth Houlbrooke, Brooke van Velden, Bhupinder Singh, Stephen Berry, Stuart Pedersen, Anneka Carlson, Shan Ng, Sam Purchas, Toni Severin, Grae O’Sullivan, Richard Evans, James McDowall, Richard Wells, Michael Warren, Andi Moore, Andy Parkins, Bruce Carley, Tom Corbett, Brian Davidson, Alan Davidson, Dan Doughty, Alex Evans, Paul Gilbert, Roger Greenslade, Stuart Hawkins, Bruce Haycock, Paul Hufflett, Nick Kearney, Tim Kronfeld, Joe Misselbrook, Craig Nelson, Joshua Perry, Sam Singh, Anthony Smith, Chris Sole, Neil Wilson, Stephen Fletcher, Wayne Grattan
Legalise Cannabis	Maki Herbert, Jeff Lye, Paula Lambert, Mike Britnell, Emma-Jane Mihaere Kingi, Vineet Prasad Shiriwastow, Jonee Saxby-Koning, Adrian McDermott, Janine Shufflebotham, Steven Wilkinson, Jeanette Saxby, Tony Brown, Rebecca Robin, Geoff McTague
Conservative	Leighton Baker, Elliot Ikilei, Melanie Taylor, Kevin Stitt, Martin Frauenstein, Lachie Ashton, Kathryn Davie, Bruce Welsh, Paul Davie, Roger Larkins, Jeffrey Johnson, Benjamin Price
Mana	Hone Harawira, Lisa McNab, James Papali'i, Tracey-lee Repia
Ban 1080	Clyde Graf, Bill Wallace, Peter Salter, Brian Adams, Carol Sawyer, James Hilton, Glen Tomlinson, Kenneth Hanson, Mary Molloy
People's Party	Roshan Nauhria, Steven Ching, Anil Sharma, Lily Yao, Joann Wu, Sree Nampally
United Future New Zealand	Damian Light, Ben Rickard, Kelleigh Sheffield-Cranstoun, Bale Nadakuitavuki, Judy Turner, Quentin Todd, John Hubscher, John Foster, Ian Gaskin, JB Woolston
Outdoors	Alan Simmons, David Haynes, Derrick Paull, Wilf Bearman-Riedel
Democrats	Stephnie de Ruyter, Chris Leitch, Jason Jobsis, Scott MacArthur, Hessel Van Wieren, Andrew Leitch, Katherine Ransom, Simon Briggs, Mischele Rhodes, Karl Matthys, Jack Collin, Heather McConachy, John Ring, John Pemberton, Dick Ryan, Carolyn McKenzie, David Wilson, Heather Marion Smith, Tracy Livingston-Pooley, Peter Adcock-White, Barry Pulford, Tricia Cheel, John McCaskey, Gary Gribben, Miriam Mowat, Robert Richards
Internet	Suzie Dawson, Ben Cooney, Daymond Goulder-Horobin, Jo Booth, Blake Bedford-Palmer, Bruce King, Nicholas Smith, Jourdan Turner

== MP changes ==
Party	New MPs	Returning MPs	Defeated MPs	MPs switching seat type
National	Matt King; Simeon Brown; Andrew Falloon; Harete Hipango; Denise Lee; Chris Penk; Erica Stanford; Tim van de Molen; Lawrence Yule; Hamish Walker		Maureen Pugh	Nicky Wagner (to list); Chris Bishop (to electorate)
Labour	Priyanca Radhakrishnan; Jan Tinetti; Willow-Jean Prime; Kiri Allan; Ginny Andersen; Jo Luxton; Deborah Russell; Liz Craig; Marja Lubeck; Paul Eagle; Tāmati Coffey; Jamie Strange; Anahila Kanongata'a-Suisuiki; Kieran McAnulty; Angie Warren-Clark; Greg O'Connor; Duncan Webb	Willie Jackson		Trevor Mallard (to list)
NZ First	Mark Patterson; Jenny Marcroft	Shane Jones	Mahesh Bindra; Pita Paraone; Ria Bond; Denis O'Rourke; Richard Prosser	Winston Peters (to list)
Green	Chlöe Swarbrick; Golriz Ghahraman		Metiria Turei; Mojo Mathers; Barry Coates; Denise Roche	
Māori Party			Marama Fox; Te Ururoa Flavell	

=== Notable MPs ===
- Following the retirement of Peter Dunne, National leader Bill English (list) became the new Father of the House, having served as an MP continuously since 1990.
- 23-year-old Chlöe Swarbrick (Green, list) became the new Baby of the House. She is the youngest MP to be elected to Parliament since 1975.

== Demographics ==
=== Gender representation ===
Of the 120 MPs elected, 46 are women (38%). This is the highest number since women were first allowed to stand for Parliament in 1919. The previous record was in 2008, when 41 female MPs were elected.
