= Electoral history of Jacinda Ardern =

List of elections featuring Jacinda Ardern as a candidate

This is a summary of the electoral history of Jacinda Ardern, Prime Minister of New Zealand (2017–2023), Leader of the Labour Party (2017–2023), a List MP (2008–17) and MP for Mount Albert (2017–2023).

== Parliamentary elections ==
=== 2008 election ===
2008 general election: Waikato
Notes:	Blue background denotes the winner of the electorate vote. Pink background denotes a candidate elected from their party list. Yellow background denotes an electorate win by a list member, or other incumbent. A ✓ or ✗ denotes status of any incumbent, win or lose respectively.						
Party	Candidate	Votes	%	±%	Party votes	%	±%
National	✓ Lindsay Tisch	20,122	63.44		18,532	57.45	
Labour	Jacinda Ardern	7,272	22.93		7,280	22.57	
Green	Wendy Harper	1,484	4.68		1,271	3.94	
NZ First	Barbara Stewart	1,353	4.27		1,708	5.29	
ACT	Mark Davies	1,089	3.43		2,088	6.47	
Kiwi	James Ross	278	0.88		171	0.53	
Democrats	John Pemberton	122	0.38		40	0.12	
United Future					285	0.88	
Māori Party					235	0.73	
Bill and Ben					195	0.60	
Progressive					188	0.58	
Legalise Cannabis					123	0.38	
Family Party					87	0.27	
Alliance					25	0.08	
Libertarianz					15	0.05	
Workers Party					8	0.02	
Pacific					4	0.01	
RAM					3	0.01	
RONZ					1	0.003	
Informal votes		245			107		
Total valid votes		31,720			32,259		
National win new seat	Majority	12,850	40.51				

=== 2011 election ===
2011 general election: Auckland Central
Notes:	Blue background denotes the winner of the electorate vote. Pink background denotes a candidate elected from their party list. Yellow background denotes an electorate win by a list member, or other incumbent. A ✓ or ✗ denotes status of any incumbent, win or lose respectively.						
Party	Candidate	Votes	%	±%	Party votes	%	±%
National	✓ Nikki Kaye	15,038	45.39	+2.48	14,447	42.24	+2.15
Labour	Jacinda Ardern	14,321	43.23	+4.69	8,590	25.11	–9.44
Green	Denise Roche	2,903	8.76	–4.66	7,797	22.79	+7.33
NZ First	Allen Davies	412	1.24	+1.24	1,403	4.10	+1.81
Conservative	Stephen Greenfield	238	0.72	+0.72	280	0.82	+0.82
ACT	David Seymour	149	0.45	–1.25	404	1.18	–2.95
Human Rights	Anthony van den Heuval	68	0.21	+0.01			
Māori Party					562	1.64	+0.71
Mana					237	0.69	+0.69
Democrats					202	0.59	+0.56
Legalise Cannabis					146	0.43	+0.14
United Future					75	0.22	–0.46
Libertarianz					53	0.15	+0.08
Alliance					10	0.03	–0.002
Informal votes		352			164		
Total valid votes		33,129			34,206		
National hold	Majority	717	2.16	–2.21			

=== 2014 election ===
2014 general election: Auckland Central
Notes:	Blue background denotes the winner of the electorate vote. Pink background denotes a candidate elected from their party list. Yellow background denotes an electorate win by a list member, or other incumbent. A ✓ or ✗ denotes status of any incumbent, win or lose respectively.						
Party	Candidate	Votes	%	±%	Party votes	%	±%
National	✓ Nikki Kaye	12,494	45.84	+0.44	12,652	44.93	+2.70
Labour	Jacinda Ardern	11,894	43.63	+0.41	6,101	21.67	–3.44
Green	Denise Roche	2,080	7.63	–1.13	6,242	22.17	–0.63
Internet	Miriam Pierard	270	0.99	+0.99			
Conservative	Regan Monahan	258	0.95	+0.23	486	1.73	+0.91
ACT	Dasha Kovalenko	193	0.71	+0.26	329	1.17	–0.01
Climate	Peter Whitmore	50	0.18	+0.18			
Money Free	Jordan Osmaston	19	0.07	+0.07			
NZ First					1,459	5.18	+1.08
Internet Mana					553	1.96	+1.27 (Note: 2014 Internet Mana swing is relative to the votes for Mana in 2011; it shared a party list with Internet in the 2014 election.)
Māori Party					158	0.56	–1.08
Legalise Cannabis					85	0.30	–0.12
United Future					53	0.19	–0.03
Civilian					17	0.06	+0.06
Ban 1080					10	0.04	+0.04
Independent Coalition					7	0.02	+0.02
Democrats					3	0.01	–0.58
Focus					2	0.01	+0.01
Informal votes		195			99		
Total valid votes		27,453			28,256		
Turnout		28,040	76.76	+1.47			
National hold	Majority	600	2.20	+0.04			

=== 2017 by-election ===
The following table shows the final results:

2017 Mount Albert by-election
Notes: Blue background denotes the winner of the by-election. Pink background denotes a candidate elected from their party list prior to the by-election. Yellow background denotes the winner of the by-election, who was a list MP prior to the by-election. A ✓ or ✗ denotes status of any incumbent, win or lose respectively.
Party	Candidate	Votes	%	±%
Labour	Jacinda Ardern	10,495	76.89	
Green	Julie Anne Genter	1,564	11.45	
Opportunities	Geoff Simmons	623	4.56	
People's Party	Vin Tomar	218	1.59	
Socialist Aotearoa	Joe Carolan	189	1.38	
Independent	Penny Bright	139	1.01	
Legalise Cannabis	Abe Gray	97	0.71	
Independent	Adam Amos	81	0.59	
Independent	Dale Arthur	54	0.39	
Human Rights Party	Anthony Van den Heuvel	34	0.24	
Independent	Peter Wakeman	30	0.21	
Not A Party	Simon Smythe	19	0.13	
Communist League	Patrick Brown	16	0.11	
Informal votes		90	0.65	
Total Valid votes		13,649	30.00	
Labour hold	Majority	8,931	65.43	

=== 2017 election ===
2017 general election: Mount Albert
Notes:	Blue background denotes the winner of the electorate vote. Pink background denotes a candidate elected from their party list. Yellow background denotes an electorate win by a list member, or other incumbent. A ✓ or ✗ denotes status of any incumbent, win or lose respectively.						
Party	Candidate	Votes	%	±%	Party votes	%	±%
Labour	✓ Jacinda Ardern	24,416	63.91	+5.74	16,742	43.19	+13.88
National	Melissa Lee	9,152	23.95	−4.66	13,112	33.82	−5.56
Green	Julie Anne Genter	2,438	6.38	−2.36	5,657	14.59	−7.09
Opportunities	Dan Thurston	924	2.41	-	1,144	2.95	—
NZ First	Andrew Littlejohn	724	1.89	—	1,329	3.42	−0.68
Conservative	Jeff Johnson	117	0.30	−1.16	65	0.16	−1.79
Independent	Bruce Stockman	66	0.17	—			
Human Rights Party	Anthony Van den Heuvel	28	0.07	−0.14			
ACT					229	0.59	−0.47
Māori Party					175	0.45	−0.03
Legalise Cannabis					63	0.16	−0.09
People's Party					31	0.07	—
United Future					22	0.05	−0.10
Outdoors					17	0.04	—
Internet					12	0.04	—
Mana					8	0.02	—
Ban 1080					6	0.01	−0.02
Democrats					2	0.01	−0.01
Informal votes		334			146		
Total valid votes		38,199			38,760		
Turnout		38,760					
Labour hold	Majority	15,264	39.96	+10.40			

=== 2020 election ===
2020 general election: Mount Albert
Notes:	Blue background denotes the winner of the electorate vote. Pink background denotes a candidate elected from their party list. Yellow background denotes an electorate win by a list member, or other incumbent. A ✓ or ✗ denotes status of any incumbent, win or lose respectively.						
Party	Candidate	Votes	%	±%	Party votes	%	±%
Labour	✓ Jacinda Ardern	29,238	70.72	+6.81	20,265	48.60	+5.41
National	Melissa Lee	7,992	19.33	–4.62	7,769	18.63	–15.19
Green	Luke Wijohn	2,299	5.56	−0.82	8,311	19.93	+5.34
Opportunities	Cameron Lord	903	2.18	−0.23	1.048	2.51	–0.44
New Conservative	Daniel Reurich	316	0.76	+0.46	241	0.58	+0.42
Human Rights	Anthony Van den Heuvel	87	0.21	+0.14			
ACT					2,485	5.96	+5.37
NZ First					760	1.82	–1.60
Māori Party					205	0.49	+0.04
Advance NZ					141	0.34	—
Legalise Cannabis					83	0.20	+0.04
TEA					41	0.10	—
ONE					34	0.08	—
Sustainable NZ					22	0.05	—
Outdoors					16	0.04	—
Vision New Zealand					11	0.02	—
Social Credit					4	0.009	–0.001
Heartland					3	0.007	–
Informal votes		507			258		
Total valid votes		41,342			41,697		
Labour hold	Majority	21,246	51.39	+11.43			
