= Electoral history of Grant Robertson =

List of elections featuring Grant Robertson as a candidate

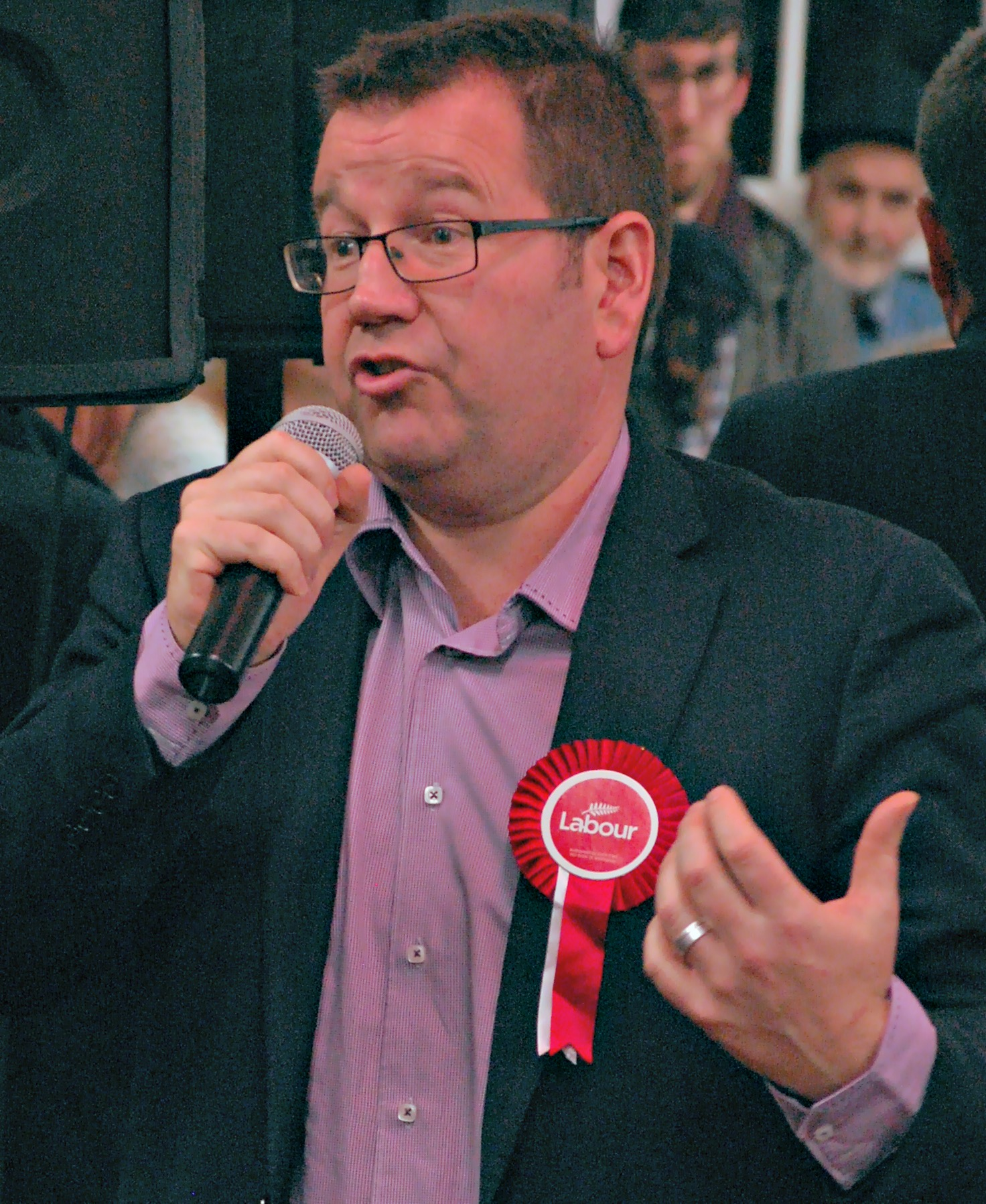
Robertson speaking at the 2014 Aro Valley candidates meeting

Grant Robertson has been Deputy Leader of the New Zealand Labour Party 2011–13, Minister of Finance since 2017, and Member of Parliament for Wellington Central 2008–2023.

== Parliamentary elections ==
=== 2008 election ===
General election 2008: Wellington Central
Notes:	Blue background denotes the winner of the electorate vote. Pink background denotes a candidate elected from their party list. Yellow background denotes an electorate win by a list member, or other incumbent. A ✓ or ✗ denotes status of any incumbent, win or lose respectively.						
Party	Candidate	Votes	%	±%	Party votes	%	±%
Labour	Grant Robertson	17,046	42.18		14,244	34.57	
National	Stephen Franks	15,142	37.47		14,589	35.41	
Green	Sue Kedgley	5,971	14.78		8,494	20.62	
ACT	Heather Roy	922	2.28		1,628	3.95	
Legalise Cannabis	Michael Appleby	407	1.01		108	0.26	
United Future New Zealand	Vaughan Smith	226	0.56		412	1.00	
Workers Party	Don Franks	171	0.42		38	0.09	
Progressive	David Somerset	141	0.35		272	0.66	
Kiwi	Rebekah Clement	106	0.26		84	0.20	
Libertarianz	Bernard Darnton	75	0.19		48	0.12	
RAM	Grant Brookes	61	0.15		13	0.03	
Independent	Al Mansell	58	0.14	-			
RONZ	Justin Harnish	46	0.11		5	0.01	
Alliance	Richard Wallis	39	0.10		20	0.05	
NZ First					629	1.53	
Te Pāti Māori					351	0.85	
Bill and Ben					215	0.52	
Family Party					38	0.09	
Pacific					8	0.02	
Democrats					4	0.01	
Informal votes		229			86		
Total valid votes		40,411			41,200		
Labour hold	Majority	1,904					

=== 2011 election ===
General election 2011: Wellington Central
Notes:	Blue background denotes the winner of the electorate vote. Pink background denotes a candidate elected from their party list. Yellow background denotes an electorate win by a list member, or other incumbent. A ✓ or ✗ denotes status of any incumbent, win or lose respectively.						
Party	Candidate	Votes	%	±%	Party votes	%	±%
Labour	✓ Grant Robertson	18,836	49.15	+6.97	10,459	26.56	−8.01
National	Paul Foster-Bell	12,460	32.51	−4.96	15,128	38.42	+3.01
Green	James Shaw	5,225	13.63	−1.14	10,903	27.69	+7.08
ACT	Stephen Whittington	412	1.07	−1.21	462	1.17	−2.78
Legalise Cannabis	Michael Appleby	404	1.05	+0.05	161	0.41	+0.15
NZ First	Ben Craven	279	0.73	+0.73	1,132	2.88	+1.35
Pirate	Gynn Rickerby	277	0.72	+0.72			
Conservative Party of New Zealand	Paul Stipkovits	236	0.62	+0.62	270	0.69	+0.69
Libertarianz	Reagan Cutting	69	0.18	−0.01	40	0.10	−0.01
Alliance	Kelly Buchanan	52	0.14	+0.14	18	0.05	-0.003
New Economics	Laurence Boomert	44	0.11	+0.11			
Independent	Puhi Karena	32	0.08	+0.08			
Te Pāti Māori					278	0.71	−0.15
United Future New Zealand					256	0.65	−0.35
Mana					250	0.63	+0.63
Democrats					15	0.04	+0.03
Informal votes		411			153		
Total valid votes		38,326			39,372		
Labour hold	Majority	6,376	16.64	+11.92			

Electorate (as at 26 November 2011): 48,316

=== 2014 election ===
General election 2014: Wellington Central
Notes:	Blue background denotes the winner of the electorate vote. Pink background denotes a candidate elected from their party list. Yellow background denotes an electorate win by a list member, or other incumbent. A ✓ or ✗ denotes status of any incumbent, win or lose respectively.						
Party	Candidate	Votes	%	±%	Party votes	%	±%
Labour	✓ Grant Robertson	19,807	51.64	+2.49	9,306	23.78	−2.78
National	Paul Foster-Bell	11,540	30.09	−2.42	14,689	37.54	−0.88
Green	James Shaw	5,077	13.24	−0.39	11,545	29.50	+1.81
NZ First	Hugh Barr	580	1.51	+0.78	1,399	3.58	+0.70
Legalise Cannabis	Alistair Gregory	353	0.92	−0.13	127	0.32	−0.09
Conservative Party of New Zealand	Brian Hooper	307	0.80	+0.18	590	1.51	+0.82
Internet	Callum Valentine	217	0.57	+0.57			
Independent	Peter Robinson	90	0.23	+0.23			
Democrats	James Knuckey	57	0.15	+0.15	26	0.07	+0.03
Independent	Puhi Karena	52	0.14	+0.06			
Internet Mana					578	1.48	+0.85 (Note: 2014 Internet Mana swing is relative to the votes for Mana in 2011; it shared a party list with Internet in the 2014 election.)
Te Pāti Māori					300	0.77	+0.06
ACT					274	0.70	−0.47
United Future New Zealand					117	0.30	−0.35
Civilian					49	0.13	+0.13
Ban 1080					20	0.05	+0.05
Focus					5	0.01	+0.01
Independent Coalition					5	0.01	+0.01
Informal votes		273			101		
Total valid votes		38,353			39,131		
Turnout		39,232	84.14	+2.33			
Labour hold	Majority	8,267	21.56	+4.92			

=== 2017 election ===
2017 general election: Wellington Central
Notes:	Blue background denotes the winner of the electorate vote. Pink background denotes a candidate elected from their party list. Yellow background denotes an electorate win by a list member, or other incumbent. A ✓ or ✗ denotes status of any incumbent, win or lose respectively.						
Party	Candidate	Votes	%	±%	Party votes	%	±%
Labour	✓ Grant Robertson	20,873	49.26	−2.38	16,500	38.29	+14.51
National	Nicola Willis	10,910	25.75	−4.34	13,156	30.53	−7.01
Green	James Shaw	6,520	15.39	+2.15	9,198	21.34	−8.16
Opportunities	Geoff Simmons	2,892	6.82	—	2,538	5.89	—
NZ First	Andy Foster	797	1.88	+0.37	972	2.26	−1.32
Independent	Gayaal Iddamalgoda	161	0.38	—			
ACT	Michael Warren	131	0.31	—	330	0.77	+0.07
Independent	Peter Robinson	71	0.17	−0.11			
Independent	Bob Wessex	19	0.04	—			
Te Pāti Māori					225	0.52	−0.25
Legalise Cannabis					55	0.13	−0.19
Conservative Party of New Zealand					29	0.07	−1.44
United Future New Zealand					28	0.06	−0.24
Mana					14	0.03	−1.45 (Note: 2017 Mana Party swing is relative to the votes for Internet-Mana in 2014; it shared a party list with the Internet Party in the 2014 election)
Ban 1080					13	0.03	−0.02
Outdoors					11	0.03	—
People's Party					10	0.03	—
Internet					9	0.02	−1.46 (Note: 2017 Internet Party swing is relative to the votes for Internet-Mana in 2014; it shared a party list with Mana Party in the 2014 election)
Democrats					6	0.01	−0.06
Informal votes		194			72		
Total valid votes		42,374			43,094		
Turnout		43,166	86.56	+2.42			
Labour hold	Majority	9,963	23.51	+1.95			

=== 2020 election ===
2020 general election: Wellington Central
Notes:	Blue background denotes the winner of the electorate vote. Pink background denotes a candidate elected from their party list. Yellow background denotes an electorate win by a list member, or other incumbent. A ✓ or ✗ denotes status of any incumbent, win or lose respectively.						
Party	Candidate	Votes	%	±%	Party votes	%	±%
Labour	✓ Grant Robertson	27,366	57.26	+8	20,876	43.4	+5.11
National	Nicola Willis	8,488	17.76	−7.99	6,937	14.43	−16.1
Green	James Shaw	8,381	17.54	+2.15	14,587	30.33	+8.99
Opportunities	Abe Gray	1,031	2.16	−4.66	1,790	3.72	−2.17
ACT	Brooke van Velden	865	1.81	+1.5	2,339	4.86	+4.09
Legalise Cannabis	Michael George Appleby	401	0.84	—	132	0.27	+0.7
Independent	Jesse Richardson	385	0.81				
New Conservative	Liam Richfield	401	0.45		204	0.42	+0.35
Advance NZ	Rose Greally	108	0.23		103	0.21	
ONE	Gina Sunderland	84	0.18		56	0.12	
Outdoors	Bruce Robert	76	0.16		27	0.06	+0.03
NZ First					537	1.11	−1.15
Te Pāti Māori					255	0.53	−0.01
Sustainable NZ					32	0.07	
Social Credit					18	0.04	
TEA					12	0.02	
Vision NZ					8	0.01	
Heartland					1	0.00	
Informal votes		47,401			47,914		
Total valid votes		47,787			48,090		
Turnout		48,090	88.97	+2.41			
Labour hold	Majority	18,878	39.5	+15.99			

== Labour party leadership elections ==
=== 2013 leadership election ===
Candidate	Caucus (40%)		Members (40%)		Unions (20%)	Total (%)
Candidate	Votes	%	Votes	%	Unions (20%)	Total (%)
David Cunliffe	11	32.35	3,243	60.14	70.77	51.15
Grant Robertson	16	47.06	1,440	26.71	17.30	32.97
Shane Jones	7	20.59	709	13.15	11.92	15.88
Total	34	100	5,392	100	100	100

=== 2014 leadership election ===
Labour leadership election results
Section (% weighting)	Candidate	Round 1	Round 2	Round 3
Caucus (40%)	Little	15.63%	34.38%	43.75%
Caucus (40%)	Robertson	43.75%	43.75%	56.25%
Caucus (40%)	Parker	21.88%	21.88%	–
Caucus (40%)	Mahuta	18.75%	–	–
Party (40%)	Little	25.71%	34.11%	44.77%
Party (40%)	Robertson	38.25%	40.92%	55.23%
Party (40%)	Parker	22.41%	24.97%	–
Party (40%)	Mahuta	13.62%	–	–
Union affiliates (20%)	Little	64.12%	70.62%	75.66%
Union affiliates (20%)	Robertson	18.91%	20.20%	24.44%
Union affiliates (20%)	Parker	7.28%	9.18%	–
Union affiliates (20%)	Mahuta	9.70%	–	–
Final result	Little	29.36%	42.52%	50.52%
Final result	Robertson	36.58%	37.91%	49.48%
Final result	Parker	19.17%	20.58%	–
Final result	Mahuta	14.89%	–	–
