= Jessica Hammond =

Politician from New Zealand

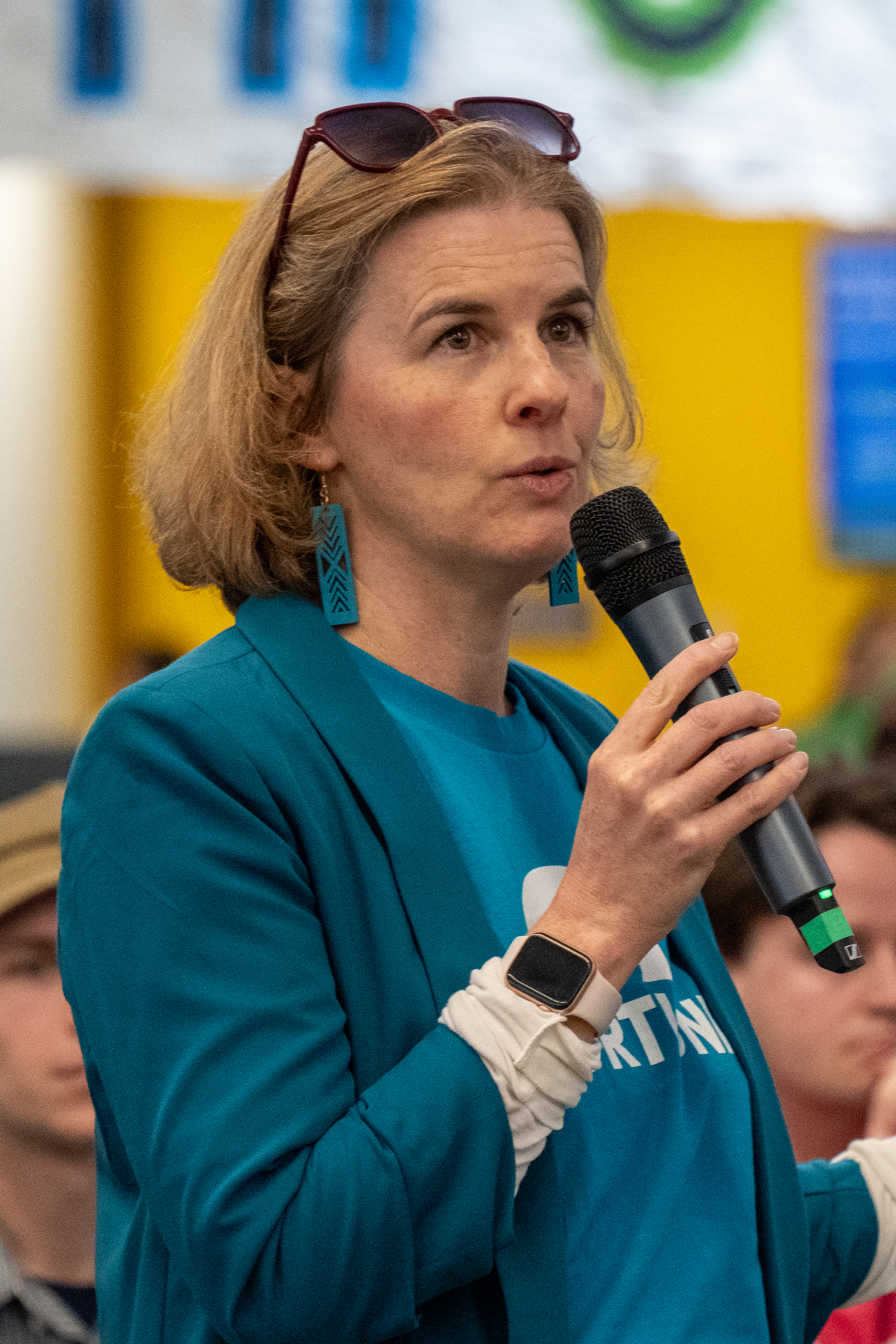
- Hammond at a student rally, May 2026

Member of the New Zealand Parliament for Opportunity party list
- Incumbent
- Assumed office 7 November 2026

Personal details
- Born: 1978 or 1979 (age 46–47) Wellington, New Zealand
- Party: Opportunity
- Education: Victoria University of Wellington
- Occupation: Member of Parliament

Jessica Hammond is a New Zealand politician, public servant, playwright, and blogger. Hammond stood for the Opportunities Party for Ōhāriu in the 2017, 2020, and 2023 general elections, coming third twice and fourth once. After the party rebranded to Opportunity, she stood again for the newly-formed electorate of Wellington North in the 2026 general election. Despite placing fourth, she was elected to Parliament off the Opportunity party list.

== Political history ==
=== 2017 general election ===
In August 2017, Hammond announced that she would contest the Ōhāriu electorate during the 2017 New Zealand general election.

She came third, with 2898 votes, 7.29% of 40,026 valid votes. Hammond's campaign emerged as one of the strongest of the 26 the Opportunities Party (TOP) candidates, beating the candidates from the Green Party, New Zealand First, United Future, and ACT New Zealand in Ōhāriu.

Following the election, Hammond stood in the 2018 Opportunities Party leadership election and came third at 13.25 percent (137 votes).

=== 2020 general election ===
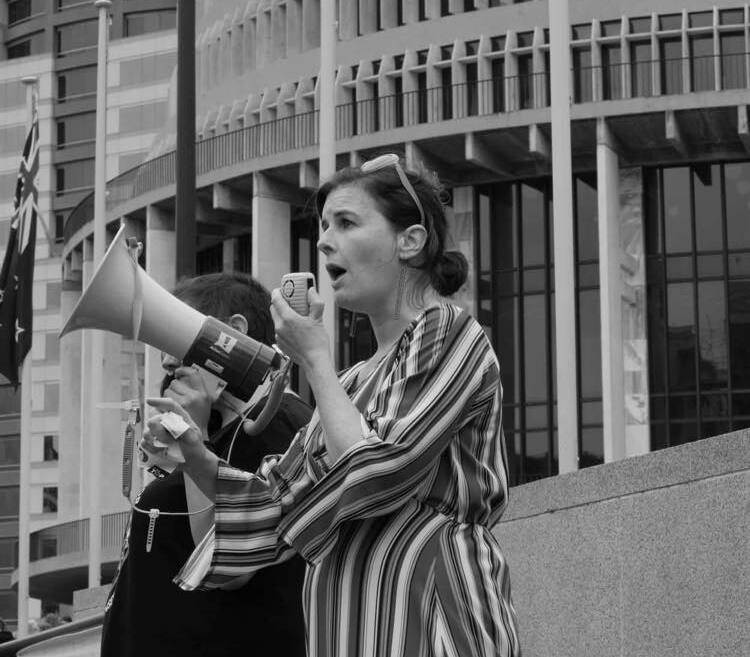
Hammond speaking at a protest, 2020

Geoff Simmons took leadership of TOP and planned on rebuilding the party. Hammond returned to TOP.

In January 2020, Hammond announced that she would contest the Ōhāriu electorate for TOP during the 2020 New Zealand general election.

Hammond and Geoff Simmons announced a policy promising to reserve approximately $2.5b every year from central government's GST tax take for councils to spend on infrastructure. They launched their policy in front of the Mt Victoria Tunnel which is a road link between Wellington's CBD and the airport that both National and Labour have promised to expand.

Hammond contested Equality Network's Scorecard of each party's commitment to addressing inequality, which raised TOP's score from one star to one and a half, bringing it in line with Labour and Māori Party in second equal place.

Hammond said the housing crisis in New Zealand was a "slow-moving crisis" ignored by both parties, because they didn't have the "guts" to fix it.

She campaigned on redeveloping the Johnsonville Mall, which leaks when it rains.

In September 2020, Hammond spoke at the Renters United protest on the Parliament lawn, also attended by Green Party's co-leader James Shaw. They protested the end to the Government's rent freeze, implemented in March under urgent coronavirus legislation, which allowed landlords to resume giving rent increase notices. Hammond called for a mandatory warrant of fitness for rental properties and a greater focus on medium-density housing.

She came third, with 4,443 votes, 10.18% of 43,646 valid votes. Hammond beat the candidates in Ōhāriu from the Green Party, New Zealand First, ACT New Zealand, New Conservatives, ONE Party, and Advance New Zealand.

=== After the 2020 election ===
In December 2020, Hammond spoke at a protest outside Parliament designed to remind MPs of a recent survey by The Salvation Army where one in five Kiwis said they can't afford to celebrate Christmas. The demonstration has been organised by the United Community Action Network (UCAN) after more than 40 welfare and poverty charities signed an open letter to the Government pleading for them to increase welfare in the lead up to Christmas.

=== 2023 election ===
During the 2023 New Zealand general election, Hammond stood as the Opportunities Party's candidate in Ōhāriu. She ranked sixth on the party list. On 18 September, Hammond took part in a Newstalk ZB-sponsored election debate with Labour Member of Parliament Greg O'Connor and National Member of Parliament Nicola Willis, who were also contesting the Ōhāriu electorate.

On 14 October, Hammond came fourth place in Ōhāriu, receiving 2,975 votes. TOP received 2.22% of the party vote, below the five percent threshold needed to enter Parliament.

=== 2026 election ===
New Zealand Parliament
Years	Term	Electorate	List	Party
2026–present	55th	List	3	Opportunity

On 31 July 2026, Hammond was selected as Opportunity's candidate for Wellington North during the 2026 New Zealand general election. She ranked third place on the party list. On 7 November, Hammond came fourth place in Wellington North with 2,278 votes, based on preliminary results. She was elected to the New Zealand Parliament on the party list.

== Personal life ==
Hammond was born in Wellington, New Zealand. Hammond has qualifications in economics, psychology, and philosophy. Hammond graduated with a Masters in philosophy from Victoria University of Wellington and has 2 children.

Hammond's daughters both have allergies and Hammond has written about the precautions taken as a parent to prevent reactions.

In 2016, Hammond wrote the play Kiwiman and Robin, which was performed at Gryphon Theatre. Inspired by The Marvelous Mrs. Maisel, Hammond performed at an open mic stand-up comedy night in 2019.

== Electoral history ==
=== 2017 Ōhāriu general election ===
2017 general election: Ōhāriu
Notes:	Blue background denotes the winner of the electorate vote. Pink background denotes a candidate elected from their party list. Yellow background denotes an electorate win by a list member, or other incumbent. A ✓ or ✗ denotes status of any incumbent, win or lose respectively.						
Party	Candidate	Votes	%	±%	Party votes	%	±%
Labour	Greg O'Connor	17,084	42.97	+8.31	14,306	35.44	+12.03
National	Brett Hudson	16,033	40.33	+23.83	18,277	45.28	−4.95
Opportunities	Jessica Hammond	2,898	7.29	—	1,678	4.16	—
Green	Tane Woodley	2,522	6.34	−1.11	3,881	9.61	−5.39
NZ First	Lisa Close	751	1.89	+0.02	1,502	3.72	−1.05
United Future	Bale Nadakuitavuki	284	0.71	−35.87	78	0.19	−0.54
ACT	Andie Moore	185	0.47	−0.09	239	0.59	−0.18
Māori Party					186	0.46	−0.10
Conservative					71	0.18	−2.81
Legalise Cannabis					68	0.17	−0.22
Outdoors					23	0.06	—
Ban 1080					18	0.04	±0.00
People's Party					13	0.03	—
Democrats					8	0.02	−0.04
Internet					8	0.02	−0.67 (Note: 2017 Internet swing is relative to the votes for Internet Mana in 2014; it shared a party list with Mana in the 2014 election.)
Mana Party					5	0.01	−0.68 (Note: 2017 Mana swing is relative to the votes for Internet Mana in 2014; it shared a party list with Internet in the 2014 election.)
Informal votes		305			84		
Total valid votes		39,757			40,361		
Turnout		40,445					
Labour gain from United Future	Majority	1,051	2.64	+0.73			

=== 2020 Ōhāriu general election ===
2020 general election: Ōhāriu
Notes:	Blue background denotes the winner of the electorate vote. Pink background denotes a candidate elected from their party list. Yellow background denotes an electorate win by a list member, or other incumbent. A ✓ or ✗ denotes status of any incumbent, win or lose respectively.						
Party	Candidate	Votes	%	±%	Party votes	%	±%
Labour	✓ Greg O'Connor	22,937	52.55	+9.58	22,282	50.82	+15.38
National	Brett Hudson	10,976	25.15	−15.18	9,732	22.20	−23.08
Opportunities	Jessica Hammond	4,443	10.18	+2.89	1,221	2.79	−1.37
Green	John Ranta	2,221	5.09	−1.25	5,940	13.55	+3.94
NZ First	Tracey Martin	928	2.13	+0.24	824	1.88	−1.84
ACT	Sean Fitzpatrick	809	1.85	+1.38	2,662	6.07	+5.48
New Conservative	Philip Lynch	357	0.82	—	375	0.86	+0.68
ONE	Allan Cawood	197	0.45	—	143	0.33	—
Advance NZ	Jolene Smith	133	0.30	—	149	0.34	—
Not A Party	Liam Walsh	49	0.11	—			
Māori Party					153	0.35	−0.11
Legalise Cannabis					80	0.18	+0.01
Sustainable NZ					19	0.04	—
Vision New Zealand					17	0.04	—
Outdoors					15	0.03	—
TEA					12	0.03	—
Social Credit					8	0.02	±0.00
Heartland					1	0.002	—
Informal votes		596			209		
Total valid votes		43,646			43,842		
Turnout		43,989	87.73	+1.64			
Labour hold	Majority	11,961	27.40	+24.76			

=== 2023 Ohariu election ===
2023 general election: Ōhāriu
Notes:	Blue background denotes the winner of the electorate vote. Pink background denotes a candidate elected from their party list. Yellow background denotes an electorate win by a list member, or other incumbent. A ✓ or ✗ denotes status of any incumbent, win or lose respectively.						
Party	Candidate	Votes	%	±%	Party votes	%	±%
Labour	✓ Greg O'Connor	17,565	41.15	−11.40	12,457	28.95	−21.87
National	Nicola Willis	16,305	38.20	+13.05	14,841	34.49	+12.29
Green	Stephanie Rodgers	4,412	10.33	+5.24	8,623	20.04	+6.49
Opportunities	Jessica Hammond	2,975	6.97	−3.21	1,882	4.37	+1.58
ACT	Paul Day	759	1.77	−0.08	2,524	5.86	−0.21
Vision New Zealand	Patrick Lim	214	0.50				
Independent	Martin Jenkins	124	0.29				
NZ First					1,442	3.35	+1.47
Te Pāti Māori					519	1.20	+0.85
NewZeal					119	0.27	+0.27
Legalise Cannabis					114	0.26	+0.08
NZ Loyal					112	0.26	+0.26
New Conservative					65	0.15	−0.71
Animal Justice					62	0.14	+0.14
Freedoms NZ					58	0.13	+0.13
Women's Rights					31	0.07	+0.07
DemocracyNZ					25	0.05	+0.05
Leighton Baker Party					12	0.02	+0.02
New Nation					11	0.02	+0.02
Informal votes		324			121		
Total valid votes		42,678			43,018		
Turnout							
Labour hold	Majority	1,260	2.95				

==== 2018 Opportunities Party leadership election ====
Candidate	Votes	%
Geoff Simmons	678	65.57
Amy Stevens	206	19.92
Jessica Hammond-Doube	137	13.25
Donna Pokere-Phillips	11	1.06
Anthony Singh	2	0.19
Majority	472	45.64
Turnout	1,034	—N/a
