= Ōhāriu (electorate) =

Coordinates: 41.21°S 174.81°E

- Single-member general constituency for the New Zealand House of Representatives
- Formation: 1978, 2008
- Region: Wellington
- Character: Urban and suburban
- Term: 3 years

Member for Ōhāriu

Ōhāriu (previously spelled Ohariu and Ōhariu) was a New Zealand parliamentary electorate returning one Member of Parliament to the House of Representatives. It existed from 1978 to 1993, and from 2008 to 2026. The electorate was abolished ahead of the 2026 general election.

The last MP for Ōhāriu was Greg O'Connor of the Labour Party, who held the seat from 2017 to 2026.

== Population centres ==
Ōhāriu is located in the north of Wellington City, providing representation for the suburbs between Crofton Downs and Tawa, including Ngaio, Khandallah, Johnsonville and Newlands. The Lower Hutt suburbs of Korokoro, Maungaraki and Normandale were in the electorate from 2008 until 2014.

== History ==
The 1977 electoral redistribution was the most overtly political since the Representation Commission had been established through an amendment to the Representation Act in 1886, initiated by Muldoon's National Government. As part of the 1976 census, a large number of people failed to fill in an electoral re-registration card, and census staff had not been given the authority to insist on the card being completed. This had little practical effect for people on the general roll, but it transferred Māori to the general roll if the card was not handed in. Together with a northward shift of New Zealand's population, this resulted in five new electorates having to be created in the upper part of the North Island. The electoral redistribution was very disruptive, and 22 electorates were abolished, while 27 electorates were newly created (including Ohariu) or re-established. These changes came into effect for the 1978 election.

Ohariu replaced the Karori electorate, but did not include any of Khandallah or Ngaio. It ceased to exist in 1990, when it was replaced by the recreated Onslow electorate.

Ōhariu (now spelled with a leading macron) was reinstated for the 2008 general election. Its boundaries were very similar to the former Ohariu-Belmont electorate, except the Belmont area (part of Lower Hutt) was lost to Rimutaka in exchange for Ōhariu picking up Crofton Downs from Wellington Central. At its re-creation the electorate stretched from Crofton Downs to southern Tawa, including Ngaio, Khandallah, Johnsonville and Newlands. Korokoro, Maungaraki and Normandale were included in the electorate until 2014.

Peter Dunne was the longserving representative of Ōhāriu (and the electorates that came between its abolition and reinstatement) from 1984 until his retirement in 2017.

The 2025 boundary review required a reduction in North Island electorates by one to reflect nationwide population shifts. The three Wellington City electorates (Rongotai, Wellington Central and Ōhāriu) were all underpopulated. All were abolished. The population of Ōhāriu was redistributed to Wellington North, Kenepuru and Hutt South.

=== Members of Parliament ===
Key

National Labour United Future Green

Election	Winner
1978 election	Hugh Templeton
1981 election	Hugh Templeton
1984 election	Peter Dunne
1987 election	Peter Dunne
1990 election	Peter Dunne
(Electorate abolished 1993–2008; see Onslow and Ohariu-Belmont)
2008 election	Peter Dunne
2011 election	Peter Dunne
2014 election	Peter Dunne
2017 election	Greg O'Connor
2020 election	Greg O'Connor
2023 election	Greg O'Connor
(Electorate abolished in 2026; see Kenepuru and Wellington North)

=== List MPs ===
Members of Parliament elected from party lists in elections where that person also unsuccessfully contested the Ōhāriu electorate. Unless otherwise stated, all MPs terms began and ended at general elections.

Election	Winner
2008 election	Charles Chauvel
2008 election	Katrina Shanks
2010	Gareth Hughes (Note: Hughes entered Parliament on 11 February 2010, following the resignation of Jeanette Fitzsimons.)
2011 election	Charles Chauvel (Note: Chauvel resigned from Parliament on 11 March 2013.)
2011 election	Gareth Hughes
2011 election	Katrina Shanks (Note: Shanks resigned from Parliament on 21 January 2014.)
2014 election	Brett Hudson
2017 election	Brett Hudson
2023 election	Nicola Willis

== Election results ==
=== 2023 election ===
2023 general election: Ōhāriu
Notes:	Blue background denotes the winner of the electorate vote. Pink background denotes a candidate elected from their party list. Yellow background denotes an electorate win by a list member, or other incumbent. A ✓ or ✗ denotes status of any incumbent, win or lose respectively.						
Party	Candidate	Votes	%	±%	Party votes	%	±%
Labour	✓ Greg O'Connor	17,565	41.15	−11.40	12,457	28.95	−21.87
National	Nicola Willis	16,305	38.20	+13.05	14,841	34.49	+12.29
Green	Stephanie Rodgers	4,412	10.33	+5.24	8,623	20.04	+6.49
Opportunities	Jessica Hammond	2,975	6.97	−3.21	1,882	4.37	+1.58
ACT	Paul Day	759	1.77	−0.08	2,524	5.86	−0.21
Vision New Zealand	Patrick Lim	214	0.50				
Independent	Martin Jenkins	124	0.29				
NZ First					1,442	3.35	+1.47
Te Pāti Māori					519	1.20	+0.85
NewZeal					119	0.27	+0.27
Legalise Cannabis					114	0.26	+0.08
NZ Loyal					112	0.26	+0.26
New Conservative					65	0.15	−0.71
Animal Justice					62	0.14	+0.14
Freedoms NZ					58	0.13	+0.13
Women's Rights					31	0.07	+0.07
DemocracyNZ					25	0.05	+0.05
Leighton Baker Party					12	0.02	+0.02
New Nation					11	0.02	+0.02
Informal votes		324			121		
Total valid votes		42,678			43,018		
Turnout							
Labour hold	Majority	1,260	2.95				

=== 2020 election ===
2020 general election: Ōhāriu
Notes:	Blue background denotes the winner of the electorate vote. Pink background denotes a candidate elected from their party list. Yellow background denotes an electorate win by a list member, or other incumbent. A ✓ or ✗ denotes status of any incumbent, win or lose respectively.						
Party	Candidate	Votes	%	±%	Party votes	%	±%
Labour	✓ Greg O'Connor	22,937	52.55	+9.58	22,282	50.82	+15.38
National	Brett Hudson	10,976	25.15	−15.18	9,732	22.20	−23.08
Opportunities	Jessica Hammond	4,443	10.18	+2.89	1,221	2.79	−1.37
Green	John Ranta	2,221	5.09	−1.25	5,940	13.55	+3.94
NZ First	Tracey Martin	928	2.13	+0.24	824	1.88	−1.84
ACT	Sean Fitzpatrick	809	1.85	+1.38	2,662	6.07	+5.48
New Conservative	Philip Lynch	357	0.82	—	375	0.86	+0.68
ONE	Allan Cawood	197	0.45	—	143	0.33	—
Advance NZ	Jolene Smith	133	0.30	—	149	0.34	—
Not A Party	Liam Walsh	49	0.11	—			
Māori Party					153	0.35	−0.11
Legalise Cannabis					80	0.18	+0.01
Sustainable NZ					19	0.04	—
Vision New Zealand					17	0.04	—
Outdoors					15	0.03	—
TEA					12	0.03	—
Social Credit					8	0.02	±0.00
Heartland					1	0.002	—
Informal votes		596			209		
Total valid votes		43,646			43,842		
Turnout		43,989	87.73	+1.64			
Labour hold	Majority	11,961	27.40	+24.76			

=== 2017 election ===
2017 general election: Ōhāriu
Notes:	Blue background denotes the winner of the electorate vote. Pink background denotes a candidate elected from their party list. Yellow background denotes an electorate win by a list member, or other incumbent. A ✓ or ✗ denotes status of any incumbent, win or lose respectively.						
Party	Candidate	Votes	%	±%	Party votes	%	±%
Labour	Greg O'Connor	17,084	42.97	+8.31	14,306	35.44	+12.03
National	Brett Hudson	16,033	40.33	+23.83	18,277	45.28	−4.95
Opportunities	Jessica Hammond Doube	2,898	7.29	—	1,678	4.16	—
Green	Tane Woodley	2,522	6.34	−1.11	3,881	9.61	−5.39
NZ First	Lisa Close	751	1.89	+0.02	1,502	3.72	−1.05
United Future	Bale Nadakuitavuki	284	0.71	−35.87	78	0.19	−0.54
ACT	Andie Moore	185	0.47	−0.09	239	0.59	−0.18
Māori Party					186	0.46	−0.10
Conservative					71	0.18	−2.81
Legalise Cannabis					68	0.17	−0.22
Outdoors					23	0.06	—
Ban 1080					18	0.04	±0.00
People's Party					13	0.03	—
Democrats					8	0.02	−0.04
Internet					8	0.02	−0.67 (Note: 2017 Internet swing is relative to the votes for Internet Mana in 2014; it shared a party list with Mana in the 2014 election.)
Mana Party					5	0.01	−0.68 (Note: 2017 Mana swing is relative to the votes for Internet Mana in 2014; it shared a party list with Internet in the 2014 election.)
Informal votes		305			84		
Total valid votes		39,757			40,361		
Turnout		40,445					
Labour gain from United Future	Majority	1,051	2.64	+0.73			

=== 2014 election ===
2014 general election: Ōhāriu
Notes:	Blue background denotes the winner of the electorate vote. Pink background denotes a candidate elected from their party list. Yellow background denotes an electorate win by a list member, or other incumbent. A ✓ or ✗ denotes status of any incumbent, win or lose respectively.						
Party	Candidate	Votes	%	±%	Party votes	%	±%
United Future	✓ Peter Dunne	13,569	36.58	−2.00	273	0.73	−1.05
Labour	Ginny Andersen	12,859	34.66	−0.18	8,771	23.42	−3.11
National	Brett Hudson	6,120	16.50	−2.06	18,810	50.23	+0.63
Green	Tane Woodley	2,764	7.45	+1.65	5,623	15.01	+0.59
Conservative	Michael Brunner	1,038	2.80	+1.78	1,118	2.99	+1.31
Independent	Sue Hamill	211	0.57	+0.57			
ACT	Sean Fitzpatrick	209	0.56	+0.56	250	0.67	−0.09
Democrats	Alida Steemson	46	0.12	+0.12	22	0.06	+0.03
NZ First					1,781	4.76	+0.85
Internet Mana					258	0.69	+0.50 (Note: 2014 Internet Mana swing is relative to the votes for Mana in 2011; it shared a party list with Internet in the 2014 election.)
Māori Party					215	0.57	+0.04
Legalise Cannabis					146	0.39	−0.03
Civilian					29	0.08	+0.08
Ban 1080					15	0.04	+0.04
Independent Coalition					9	0.02	+0.02
Focus					4	0.01	+0.01
Informal votes		283			126		
Total valid votes		37,099			37,450		
United Future hold	Majority	710	1.91	−1.83			

=== 2011 election ===
2011 general election: Ōhariu
Notes:	Blue background denotes the winner of the electorate vote. Pink background denotes a candidate elected from their party list. Yellow background denotes an electorate win by a list member, or other incumbent. A ✓ or ✗ denotes status of any incumbent, win or lose respectively.						
Party	Candidate	Votes	%	±%	Party votes	%	±%
United Future	✓ Peter Dunne	14,357	38.58	+5.97	672	1.78	−0.43
Labour	Charles Chauvel	12,965	34.84	+4.89	10,036	26.53	−6.80
National	Katrina Shanks	6,907	18.56	−7.97	18,764	49.60	+3.33
Green	Gareth Hughes	2,160	5.80	−1.26	5,453	14.42	+5.28
Conservative	Stephen Woodnutt	378	1.02	+1.02	636	1.68	+1.68
NZ First	Hugh Barr	339	0.91	+0.91	1,478	3.91	+1.82
Libertarianz	Sean Fitzpatrick	109	0.29	+0.29	47	0.12	+0.07
ACT					286	0.76	−2.66
Māori Party					201	0.53	−0.20
Legalise Cannabis					160	0.42	+0.11
Mana					73	0.19	+0.19
Alliance					12	0.03	−0.11
Democrats					10	0.03	+0.003
Informal votes		369			137		
Total valid votes		37,215			37,828		
United Future hold	Majority	1,392	3.74	+1.07			

Electorate (as at 26 November 2011): 46,740

=== 2008 election ===
2008 general election: Ōhariu
Notes:	Blue background denotes the winner of the electorate vote. Pink background denotes a candidate elected from their party list. Yellow background denotes an electorate win by a list member, or other incumbent. A ✓ or ✗ denotes status of any incumbent, win or lose respectively.						
Party	Candidate	Votes	%	±%	Party votes	%	±%
United Future	✓ Peter Dunne	12,303	32.61		843	2.21	
Labour	Charles Chauvel	11,297	29.95		12,728	33.33	
National	Katrina Shanks	10,009	26.53		17,670	46.27	
Green	Gareth Hughes	2,665	7.06		3,488	9.13	
Kiwi	Joel Sison	522	1.38		283	0.74	
ACT	Colin du Plessis	487	1.29		1,304	3.41	
Legalise Cannabis	Danyl Strype	330	0.87		119	0.31	
Alliance	Kelly Buchanan	111	0.29		55	0.14	
NZ First					798	2.09	
Māori Party					278	0.73	
Progressive					273	0.71	
Bill and Ben					208	0.54	
Family Party					65	0.17	
Pacific					22	0.06	
Libertarianz					20	0.05	
Workers Party					11	0.03	
Democrats					9	0.02	
RAM					7	0.02	
RONZ					7	0.02	
Informal votes		242			88		
Total valid votes		37,724			38,188		
United Future win new seat	Majority	1,006	2.67				

=== 1990 election ===
1990 general election: Ohariu
Party	Candidate	Votes	%	±%
Labour	Peter Dunne	9,930	45.04	−13.56
National	George Mathew	9,147	41.49	
Green	Gary Reese	1,839	8.34	
NewLabour	Chris Ritchie	682	3.09	
McGillicuddy Serious	G E M Boutel	138	0.62	
Independent	A R Kirk	131	0.59	
Social Credit	A E Smith	91	0.41	
Democrats	Bob Stevenson	85	0.38	
Majority		783	3.55	−16.72
Turnout		22,043	86.25	−4.14
Registered electors		25,557		

=== 1987 election ===
1987 general election: Ohariu
Party	Candidate	Votes	%	±%
Labour	Peter Dunne	12,983	58.60	+20.68
National	David Lloyd	8,491	38.33	
Democrats	Bill Campbell	448	2.02	
McGillicuddy Serious	Darrly Alyward	136	0.61	
NZ Party	Keith Ralph	94	0.42	
Majority		4,492	20.27	+14.00
Turnout		22,152	90.39	−4.78
Registered electors		24,507		

=== 1984 election ===
1984 general election: Ohariu
Party	Candidate	Votes	%	±%
Labour	Peter Dunne	8,282	37.92	
National	Hugh Templeton	6,911	31.64	−13.96
NZ Party	Bob Jones	6,326	28.97	
Social Credit	Kathleen Loncar	275	1.25	
United front	R T Obee	42	0.19	
Majority		1,371	6.27	
Turnout		21,836	95.17	+4.31
Registered electors		22,944		

=== 1981 election ===
1981 general election: Ohariu
Party	Candidate	Votes	%	±%
National	Hugh Templeton	9,261	45.60	−1.05
Labour	Norman Ely	7,694	37.88	
Social Credit	Eric Elliot	3,102	15.27	+4.60
LIFE Party	N L Mander	250	1.23	
Majority		1,567	7.71	−2.66
Turnout		20,307	90.86	+21.68
Registered electors		22,349		

=== 1978 election ===
1978 general election: Ohariu
Party	Candidate	Votes	%	±%
National	Hugh Templeton	8,809	46.65	
Labour	Helene Ritchie	6,851	36.28	
Social Credit	Eric Elliott	2,015	10.67	
Values	Cathy Wilson	735	3.89	
Right to Life	Don Gee	471	2.49	
Majority		1,958	10.37	
Turnout		18,881	69.18	
Registered electors		27,290		
