= 2018 Opportunities Party leadership election =

- 1 to 8 December 2018
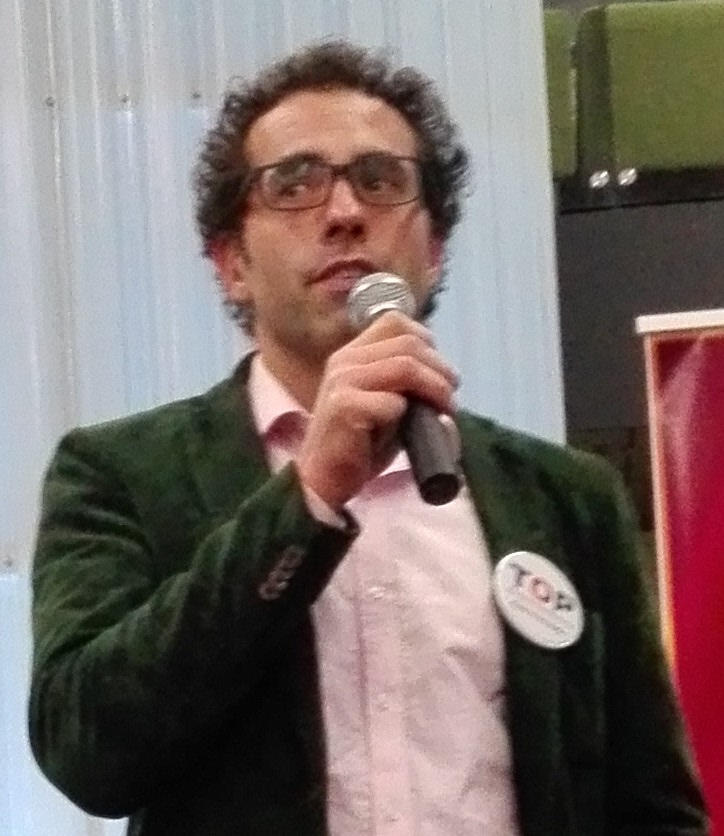

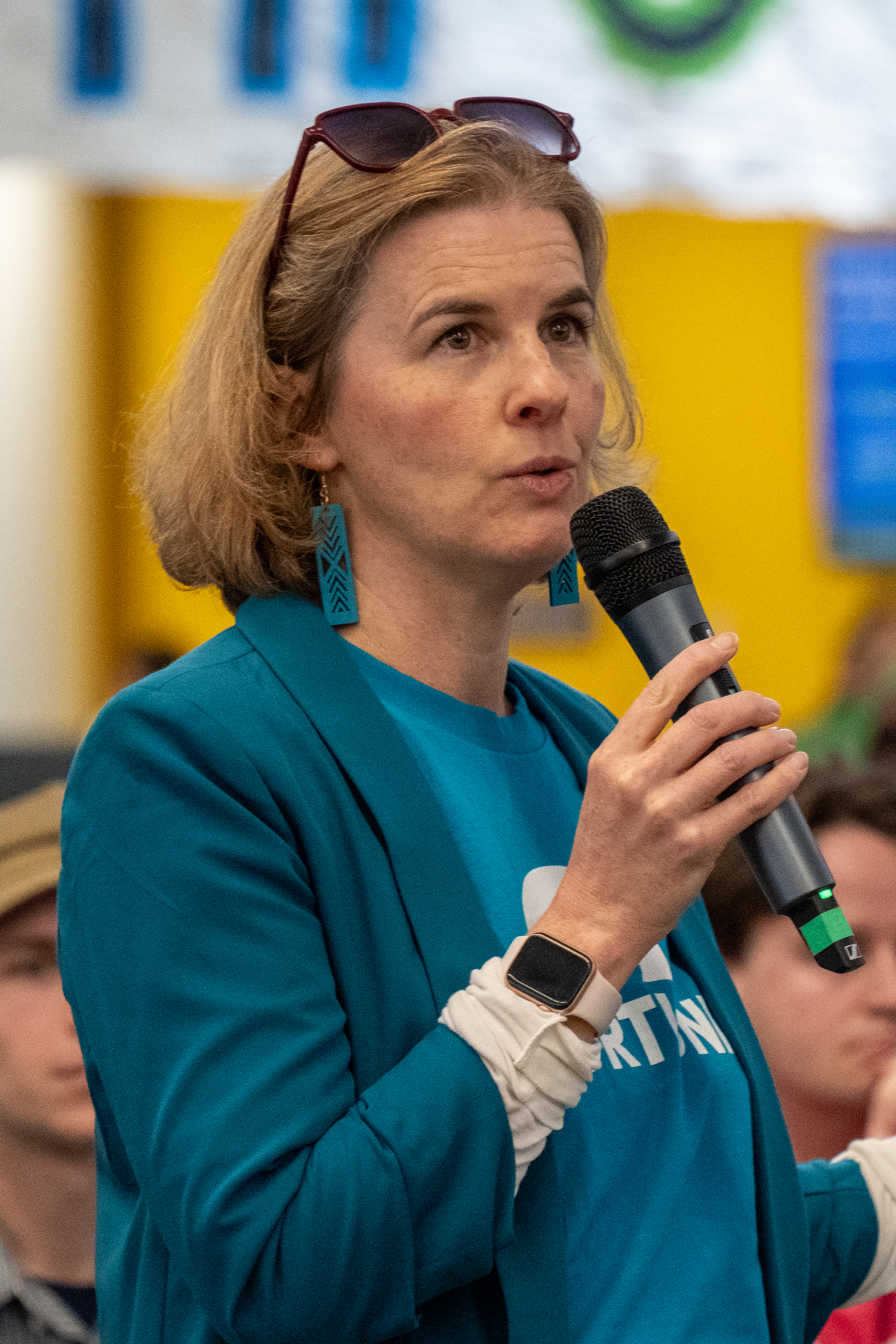

Candidate	Geoff Simmons	Amy Stevens	Jessica Hammond-Doube
Popular vote	678	206	137
Percentage	65.57%	19.92%	13.25%
Candidate	Donna Pokere-Phillips	Anthony Singh
Popular vote	11	2
Percentage	1.06%	0.19%
Leader before election
Gareth Morgan
Geoff Simmons (interim)
Leader after election
Geoff Simmons

The 2018 Opportunities Party leadership election was held in New Zealand in December 2018 to determine the future leadership of The Opportunities Party (TOP) political party. The election was won by previous deputy leader Geoff Simmons.

== Background ==
TOP was founded in November 2016 by wealthy economist Gareth Morgan to advocate for "a prosperous, fair and equitable society". TOP contested the 2017 general election gaining 2.44% of the vote, but won no seats in the New Zealand House of Representatives. Three months after the election, Morgan resigned as leader of the party but said TOP would contest the 2020 election though he would not lead it.

In August 2018, The Opportunities Party appointed a new board and former deputy leader Geoff Simmons was appointed as an interim leader. The new board embarked on a "listening tour" across the country to gauge supporters reactions and future interest. Additionally, a ballot of party members was conducted by digital voting company Horizon State to determine a new party leader.

== Candidates ==
The following party members contested the leadership:

- Jessica Hammond-Doube, TOP candidate for Ohariu in 2017
- Donna Pokere-Phillips, TOP candidate for Hamilton West in 2017
- Geoff Simmons, former deputy leader. Candidate for both Wellington Central in 2017 and Mount Albert in a 2017 by-election.
- Anthony Singh, party member
- Amy Stevens, Auckland lawyer (endorsed by Morgan)

== Result ==
The following table gives the members ballot results:

Candidate	Votes	%
Geoff Simmons	678	65.57
Amy Stevens	206	19.92
Jessica Hammond-Doube	137	13.25
Donna Pokere-Phillips	11	1.06
Anthony Singh	2	0.19
Majority	472	45.64
Turnout	1,034	—N/a

== Aftermath ==
In addition to Simmons being elected leader, fellow leadership contestant Donna Pokere-Phillips was elected in a concurrent election to serve as TOP's membership representative on the party board. In March 2019 Morgan announced his resignation from TOP altogether, Simmons thanked Morgan for creating the party and his subsequent contributions.
