= 2022 Hamilton mayoral election =

2022 Hamilton mayoral election may refer to:

- 2022 Hamilton, New Zealand, mayoral election, an election held to elect the mayor of Hamilton, New Zealand.
- 2022 Hamilton, Ontario, municipal election, an election held to elect members of the municipal government of Hamilton, Ontario, including the mayor.
