= Geoff Simmons =

Former New Zealand politician (born 1974)

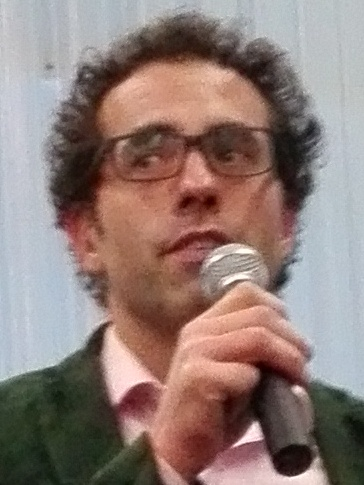

2nd Leader of The Opportunities Party
- In office August 2018 – 3 November 2020
- Preceded by: Gareth Morgan
- Succeeded by: Shai Navot (as interim leader)

1st Deputy Leader of The Opportunities Party
- In office 24 May 2017 – 14 December 2017
- Leader: Gareth Morgan
- Succeeded by: Teresa Moore

Personal details
- Born: 27 December 1974 (age 51) New Zealand
- Party: TOP
- Education: University of Auckland

Geoffrey Leonard Simmons (born 27 December 1974) is an economist and former leader of The Opportunities Party (TOP), a political party in New Zealand. He stood for TOP in the February 2017 Mount Albert by-election, in the Wellington Central electorate in the 2017 general election, and in the Rongotai electorate in the 2020 general election.

== Early life ==
Simmons grew up in Ōkaihau (Far North) and West Auckland, the son of two teachers. He graduated in economics from the University of Auckland. He worked as an economic analyst for the New Zealand Treasury from 1999 to 2003. He worked as an economic advisor for the UK Home Office in 2003–05 and then for the East Midlands Development Agency in 2005–08. He was the general manager and an economist for the Morgan Foundation (founded by Gareth Morgan) in Wellington from 2009 to 2016. He has co-authored four books with Morgan, on health (Health Cheque: The Truth We Should All Know about New Zealand's Public Health System), fishing (Hook, Line and Blinkers: Everything Kiwis Never Wanted to Know about Fishing), Antarctica (Ice, Mice and Men: the Issues Facing our Far South) and food (Appetite for Destruction: Food – the Good, the Bad and the Fatal). He is a Lancet Commission on Obesity Fellow.

Simmons has done acting, including improvisational theatre, since he was at secondary school. He has performed with the Improv Bandits, a professional troupe in Auckland, Best on Tap in Wellington, and Stagecraft at the Gryphon Theatre in Wellington. He teaches with the Wellington Improv Troupe.

== Political career ==
=== 2017 general election ===
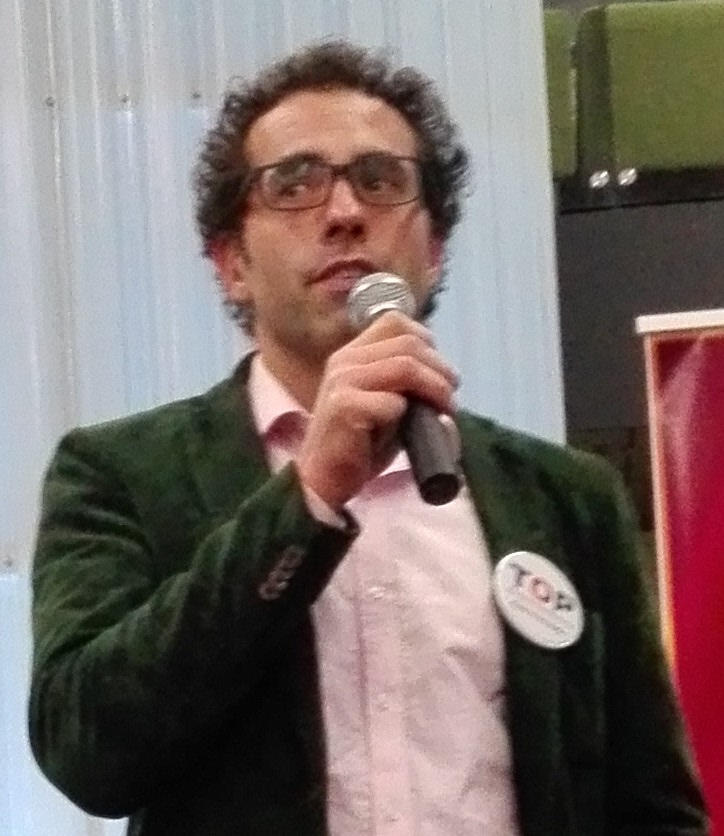
Simmons speaking at the 2017 Wellington Central candidates debate

In the February 2017 Mount Albert by-election, Simmons stood as a candidate for the Opportunities Party (TOP), founded by Gareth Morgan. He came third, with 623 votes, 4.56% of 13,649 valid votes.

On 24 May 2017, Gareth Morgan announced that Simmons as the deputy leader of TOP and their candidate in the Wellington Central electorate in the 2017 New Zealand general election. During the 2017 election for Wellington Central held on 23 September, Simmons came fourth place with 2,892 votes.

=== TOP revamp and leadership ===
In December 2017, three months after the election, Morgan resigned as leader and Simmons and two candidates also stepped down from their roles. In August 2018, TOP appointed Simmons as interim leader until an election of party members could be held to determine a replacement to Morgan. In the ensuing internal leadership election, Simmons contested the position with four other candidates. On 8 December 2018, the party board announced Simmons had been successful.

During the TOP's party relaunch held in October 2019, Simmons delivered a speech advocating a universal basic income and "breaking the Labour / National duopoly".

=== 2020 election ===
In July 2020, Simmons announced that he would contest the Rongotai electorate during the 2020 New Zealand general election. At the beginning of his campaign for the seat Simmons spelled the name of the electorate incorrectly in his advertising as "Rongatai".

During the 2020 election held on 17 October, Simmons came fourth place in Rongotai with 2,794 votes. Based on full results published on 6 November, the TOP party won 43,449 party votes (1.5% of the popular vote). Following the election results, Simmons and deputy leader Shai Navot emailed members, supporters, and donors, thanking them for their support.

During the party's first annual general meeting held on 3 November, Simmons resigned as leader of TOP.

== Electoral history ==
=== 2017 Mount Albert by-election ===
The following table shows the final results:

2017 Mount Albert by-election
Notes: Blue background denotes the winner of the by-election. Pink background denotes a candidate elected from their party list prior to the by-election. Yellow background denotes the winner of the by-election, who was a list MP prior to the by-election. A ✓ or ✗ denotes status of any incumbent, win or lose respectively.
Party	Candidate	Votes	%	±%
Labour	Jacinda Ardern	10,495	76.89	
Green	Julie Anne Genter	1,564	11.45	
Opportunities	Geoff Simmons	623	4.56	
People's Party	Vin Tomar	218	1.59	
Socialist Aotearoa	Joe Carolan	189	1.38	
Independent	Penny Bright	139	1.01	
Legalise Cannabis	Abe Gray	97	0.71	
Independent	Adam Amos	81	0.59	
Independent	Dale Arthur	54	0.39	
Human Rights Party	Anthony Van den Heuvel	34	0.24	
Independent	Peter Wakeman	30	0.21	
Not A Party	Simon Smythe	19	0.13	
Communist League	Patrick Brown	16	0.11	
Informal votes		90	0.65	
Total Valid votes		13,649	30.00	
Labour hold	Majority	8,931	65.43	

=== 2017 Wellington Central general election ===
2017 general election: Wellington Central
Notes:	Blue background denotes the winner of the electorate vote. Pink background denotes a candidate elected from their party list. Yellow background denotes an electorate win by a list member, or other incumbent. A ✓ or ✗ denotes status of any incumbent, win or lose respectively.						
Party	Candidate	Votes	%	±%	Party votes	%	±%
Labour	✓ Grant Robertson	20,873	49.26	−2.38	16,500	38.29	+14.51
National	Nicola Willis	10,910	25.75	−4.34	13,156	30.53	−7.01
Green	James Shaw	6,520	15.39	+2.15	9,198	21.34	−8.16
Opportunities	Geoff Simmons	2,892	6.82	—	2,538	5.89	—
NZ First	Andy Foster	797	1.88	+0.37	972	2.26	−1.32
Independent	Gayaal Iddamalgoda	161	0.38	—			
ACT	Michael Warren	131	0.31	—	330	0.77	+0.07
Independent	Peter Robinson	71	0.17	−0.11			
Independent	Bob Wessex	19	0.04	—			
Māori Party					225	0.52	−0.25
Legalise Cannabis					55	0.13	−0.19
Conservative					29	0.07	−1.44
United Future New Zealand					28	0.06	−0.24
Mana					14	0.03	−1.45 (Note: 2017 Mana Party swing is relative to the votes for Internet-Mana in 2014; it shared a party list with the Internet Party in the 2014 election)
Ban 1080					13	0.03	−0.02
Outdoors					11	0.03	—
People's Party					10	0.03	—
Internet					9	0.02	−1.46 (Note: 2017 Internet Party swing is relative to the votes for Internet-Mana in 2014; it shared a party list with Mana Party in the 2014 election)
Democrats					6	0.01	−0.06
Informal votes		194			72		
Total valid votes		42,374			43,094		
Turnout		43,166	86.56	+2.42			
Labour hold	Majority	9,963	23.51	+1.95			

=== 2020 Rongotai general election ===
2020 general election: Rongotai
Notes:	Blue background denotes the winner of the electorate vote. Pink background denotes a candidate elected from their party list. Yellow background denotes an electorate win by a list member, or other incumbent. A ✓ or ✗ denotes status of any incumbent, win or lose respectively.						
Party	Candidate	Votes	%	±%	Party votes	%	±%
Labour	✓ Paul Eagle	25,926	57.11	+5.39	23,878	52.31	+8.05
Green	Teall Crossen	6,719	14.80	−0.15	10,765	23.58	+5.82
National	David Patterson	6,447	14.20	−10.86	6,013	13.17	−14.84
Opportunities	Geoff Simmons	3,387	7.46	+3.37	1,272	2.79	−1.83
ACT	Nicole McKee	965	2.13	+1.86	1,795	3.93	+3.59
NZ First	Taylor Arneil	472	1.04	−1.04	883	1.93	−1.71
New Conservative	Bruce Welsh	431	0.95	+0.40	232	0.51	−0.37
Integrity	Troy Mihaka	162	0.36	—			
Independent	Don Newt McDonald	110	0.24	—			
Māori Party					201	0.44	−0.06
Advance NZ					184	0.40	—
Legalise Cannabis					70	0.15	−0.01
ONE					45	0.1	—
Sustainable NZ					27	0.06	—
Outdoors					21	0.04	+0.01
Vision NZ					21	0.04	—
Social Credit					10	0.02	+0.01
TEA					7	0.015	—
Heartland					7	0.015	—
Informal votes		779			259		
Total valid votes		45,398			45,649		
Turnout		45,649	?	?			
Labour hold	Majority	19,207	42.31	+15.65			

==== Leadership elections ====
===== 2018 Opportunities Party leadership election =====
Candidate	Votes	%
Geoff Simmons	678	65.57
Amy Stevens	206	19.92
Jessica Hammond-Doube	137	13.25
Donna Pokere-Phillips	11	1.06
Anthony Singh	2	0.19
Majority	472	45.64
Turnout	1,034	—N/a
