= 2022 Hamilton, New Zealand, mayoral election =

Local election in New Zealand

2022 Hamilton mayoral election
- 8 October 2022
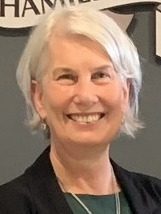

Candidate	Paula Southgate	Geoff Taylor
Party	Independent	Independent
Popular vote	15,880	14,043
Percentage	53.07%	46.93%
Mayor before election
Paula Southgate
Elected mayor
Paula Southgate

The 2022 Hamilton mayoral election was a local election held from 16 September to 8 October in Hamilton, New Zealand, as part of that year's city council election and nation-wide local elections. Voters elected the mayor of Hamilton for the 2022–2025 term of the Hamilton City Council. Postal voting and the single transferable vote and postal voting was used (the latter for the first time).

Incumbent mayor Paula Southgate was re-elected.

== List of candidates ==
=== Declared candidates ===
Candidate	Photo	Affiliation	Notes
Lee Bloor		Independent	
Lachlan Coleman		Independent	
Jack Gielen		The People's Voice	Former deputy leader of The Republic of New Zealand Party and serial election candidate
Horiana Henderson		Independent	
Riki Manarangi		None	
Donna Pokere-Phillips		Outdoors	Co-leader of the NZ Outdoors & Freedom Party
Paula Southgate		Independent	Incumbent mayor
Geoff Taylor		None	Deputy mayor

=== Declined to be candidates ===
- Louise Hutt, 2019 mayoral candidate
- Angela O'Leary, city councillor
- Ewan Wilson, city councillor

== Results ==
2022 Hamilton mayoral election
Party	Candidate	FPv%	Count						
Party	Candidate	FPv%	1	2	3	4	5	6	7
Independent	Paula Southgate		?	?	?	?	?	?	15,880
Independent	Geoff Taylor		?	?	?	?	?	?	14,043
Independent	Horiana Henderson		?	?	?	?	?	1,789	
Outdoors	Donna Pokere-Phillips		?	?	?	?	1,248		
Independent	Lachlan Coleman		?	?	?	1,109			
Independent	Riki Manarangi		?	?	969				
The Peoples Voice	Jack Gielen		?	517					
Independent	Lee Bloor		416						
Quota: 14,962

== Aftermath ==
On 14 October 2022, Southgate named Angela O'Leary as deputy mayor.
