= 2017 Mount Albert by-election =

New Zealand by-election

- 25 February 2017

The Mount Albert electorate seat in the House of Representatives
- Turnout: 13,649 (30.0%)
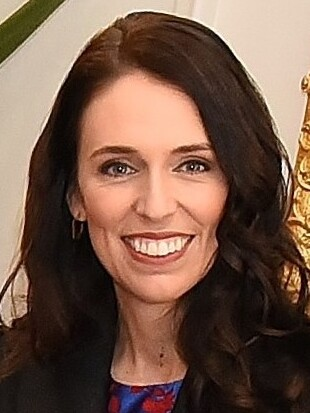

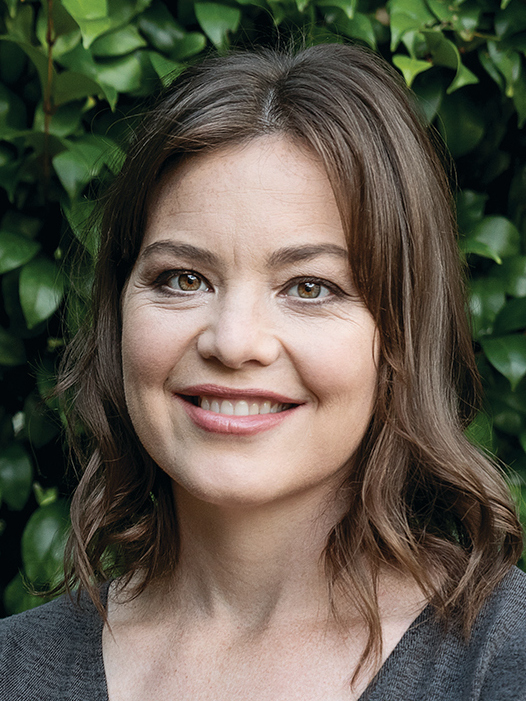
Candidate	Jacinda Ardern	Julie Anne Genter
Party	Labour	Green
Popular vote	10,495	1,564
Percentage	76.89%	11.45%
- Ardern: 70–80% 80–90% No polling places
MP before election
David Shearer
Labour
Elected MP
Jacinda Ardern
Labour

The 2017 Mount Albert by-election was a New Zealand by-election held in the Mount Albert electorate on 25 February 2017 during the 51st New Zealand Parliament. The seat was vacated following the resignation of David Shearer, a former Leader of the New Zealand Labour Party.

The by-election was avoided by all right and centre-right parties, and turnout was low. The electorate was won by Labour Party list MP Jacinda Ardern by a large margin. Another Labour member, Raymond Huo, filled Ardern's list seat.

== Background ==
The Mount Albert electorate includes the communities of Point Chevalier, Owairaka, Mount Albert, part of Sandringham, Kingsland, and is home to Eden Park. As a result of boundary changes in 2014, the electorate gained the suburbs of Grey Lynn and Westmere, but lost Waterview and the areas alongside Rosebank Road to the Kelston electorate. Mount Albert (known as Owairaka from 1996 to 1999) was held between 1981 and 2009 by Helen Clark, ending with her retirement from parliament.

Although just 23.0% of the Mount Albert electorate is over 50 (the fifth-lowest proportion among general electorates), the share of those aged 30–49 (34.1%) is the highest in New Zealand. The largest sector of those working is in the professions, science and technical industries (16.7%); a further 5.4% work in the media and communications sectors, the largest share of any general electorate. Compared to the rest of New Zealand in 2013, Mount Albert had low levels of those who were married (33.5%, 5th lowest), owned their own home (36.4%, 7th lowest), and who declared a Christian religious affiliation (38.5%, 3rd lowest).

The winning candidate in the 2014 election, David Shearer (Labour), captured a majority (58.7%) of the 35,716 valid electorate votes cast for candidates in the Mount Albert electorate. The National Party captured a plurality (39.1%) of the party votes in Mount Albert, up 2.4 percentage points on its party vote share in 2011. The Labour Party captured 29.4% of the party votes, while the Green Party was third with 21.8% of the party votes. No other party gained more than 5% of the party votes. Turnout (total votes cast as a proportion of enrolled electors) in 2014 was 80.4%.

=== Resignation of David Shearer ===
On 8 December 2016, David Shearer, a former leader of Labour, announced that he was going to head the United Nations Mission in South Sudan. He officially resigned from the House of Representatives on 31 December 2016.

== Candidates ==
Party	Name	Notes
Independent	Adam Amos	41-year old carer and former candidate for the Waitematā Local Board.
Labour	Jacinda Ardern	36-year old two-time Auckland Central candidate and high-profile List MP, Jacinda Ardern was the only nomination for Labour. Her campaign launch as Labour's candidate was held on 22 January.
Independent	Dale Arthur	A self-employed 36-year old local resident and great-nephew of former Labour cabinet minister Norman King.
Independent	Penny Bright	An activist and a perennial candidate, Bright finished sixth in the 2016 Auckland mayoral election with 7,022 votes.
Communist League	Patrick Brown	Activist, former candidate for various positions in local and national elections, and 62-year old supermarket worker, Brown received 1,826 votes in the 2016 Auckland mayoral election and lives in Māngere Bridge.
Socialist Aotearoa	Joe Carolan	46-year old former Mana Movement candidate and resident of Owairaka Joe Carolan stood as the candidate for Socialist Aotearoa, a small revolutionary anti-capitalist organisation of which he is a co-founder. Socialist Aotearoa stood on the ballot as "Socialist – People Before Profit."
Green	Julie Anne Genter	Second-term Green list member of parliament and resident of Mount Eden Julie Anne Genter.
Legalise Cannabis	Abe Gray	34-year old university tutor, resident of Dunedin North, former candidate for the Dunedin mayoralty, and director of New Zealand's only cannabis museum.
Opportunities	Geoff Simmons	42-year old Morgan Foundation economist Geoff Simmons was the candidate of the newly-formed Opportunities Party.
Not A Party	Simon Smythe	47-year old Miramar resident Simon Smythe stood as a candidate and campaigned on the basis of encouraging the boycott of the by-election and the upcoming general election.
People's Party	Vin Tomar	42-year old early childhood teacher and real estate agent for the newly formed People's Party.
Human Rights Party	Anthony van den Heuvel	60-year old Kingsland resident Anthony van den Heuvel, a mathematician and perennial candidate who contested the Mount Albert seat four times before between 1993 and 2014.
Independent	Peter Wakeman	Former ACT, National, Democratic, Social Credit, Green Party, Internet, and Labour Party member, Wakeman stood in both the 1993 Tauranga by-election and 2004 Te Tai Hauauru by-election as an independent candidate.

Nominations for the by-election closed on 1 February 2017 with thirteen candidates nominated. The New Zealand National Party announced it would not stand a candidate in the by-election. The Prime Minister, Bill English, cited that approach for multiple reasons; Mount Albert was a safe seat for Labour and that Jacinda Ardern, who is highly likely to get Labour's nomination, would be "pretty difficult to beat". Other than The Opportunities Party, no right or centrist parties stood, with ACT New Zealand, United Future, and New Zealand First all avoiding the by-election.

== Voting ==
Voting from overseas started on 8 February. Advance voting started on 13 February 2017.

Overall voter turnout in the by-election was low. After the counting of special votes, the Electoral Commission recorded a turnout of only 30% of enrolled voters in Mount Albert. This compares to a much higher turnout of 79.4% in the electorate at the 2014 general election.

== Results ==
The following table shows the final results:

2017 Mount Albert by-election
Notes: Blue background denotes the winner of the by-election. Pink background denotes a candidate elected from their party list prior to the by-election. Yellow background denotes the winner of the by-election, who was a list MP prior to the by-election. A ✓ or ✗ denotes status of any incumbent, win or lose respectively.
Party	Candidate	Votes	%	±%
Labour	Jacinda Ardern	10,495	76.89	
Green	Julie Anne Genter	1,564	11.45	
Opportunities	Geoff Simmons	623	4.56	
People's Party	Vin Tomar	218	1.59	
Socialist Aotearoa	Joe Carolan	189	1.38	
Independent	Penny Bright	139	1.01	
Legalise Cannabis	Abe Gray	97	0.71	
Independent	Adam Amos	81	0.59	
Independent	Dale Arthur	54	0.39	
Human Rights Party	Anthony Van den Heuvel	34	0.24	
Independent	Peter Wakeman	30	0.21	
Not A Party	Simon Smythe	19	0.13	
Communist League	Patrick Brown	16	0.11	
Informal votes		90	0.65	
Total Valid votes		13,649	30.00	
Labour hold	Majority	8,931	65.43	

Labour list MP Jacinda Ardern won the electorate and kept the seat for the Labour Party. As Ardern moved from a list seat to an electorate seat, the Labour Party replaced her list seat with another person from their party list. Labour party leader, Andrew Little, announced this would be Raymond Huo. Huo was the third-highest unelected person on Labour's party list, but both Maryan Street and Moana Mackey announced they would decline the chance to return to Parliament.

== See also ==
- 2016 Mount Roskill by-election, on 3 December 2016
