= Greg O'Connor (politician) =

New Zealand politician

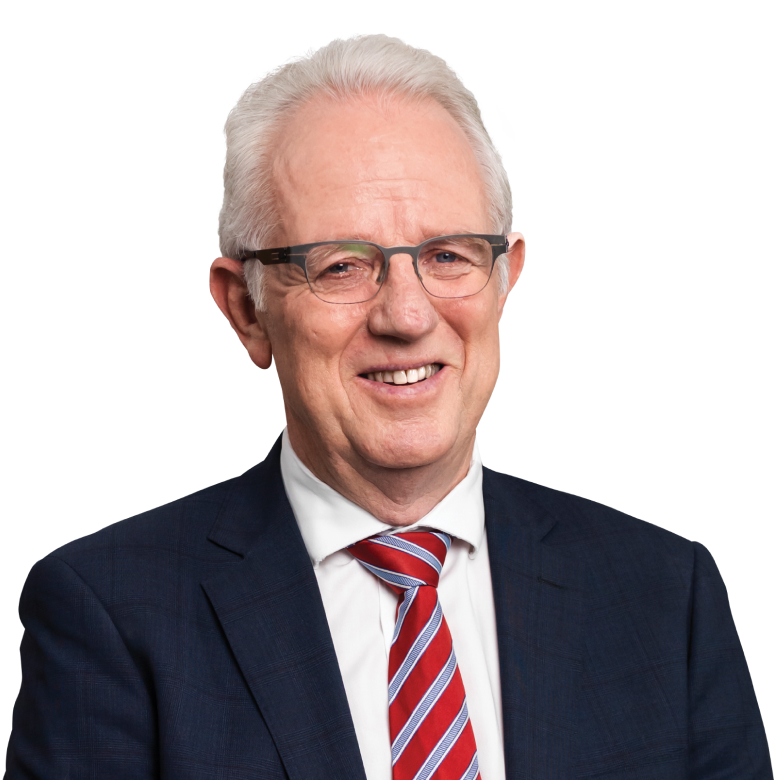
- O'Connor in 2023

Wellington City Councillor for the Takapū/Northern general ward
- Incumbent
- Assumed office 22 October 2026
- Preceded by: Tony Randle

Second Assistant Speaker of the House of Representatives
- In office 6 December 2023 – 7 November 2026
- Preceded by: Jacqui Dean

11th Deputy Speaker of the New Zealand House of Representatives
- In office 25 August 2022 – 6 December 2023
- Speaker: Adrian Rurawhe
- Preceded by: Adrian Rurawhe
- Succeeded by: Barbara Kuriger

Member of the New Zealand Parliament for Ōhāriu
- In office 23 September 2017 – 7 November 2026
- Preceded by: Peter Dunne
- Succeeded by: Electorate disestablished
- Majority: 1,260

Personal details
- Born: 12 May 1958 (age 68) Buller, New Zealand
- Party: Labour
- Spouse: Desley
- Relations: Damien O'Connor (cousin)
- Children: 3

Gregory Eamon O’Connor (born 12 May 1958) is a New Zealand Labour Party politician and former police officer. He is currently the Wellington City Councillor for the Takapū/Northern general ward. He was the member of Parliament for Ōhāriu from 2017 to 2026, during which he served as the deputy speaker and second assistant speaker of the House of Representatives.

== Early life ==
O'Connor was born in the Buller District on the West Coast where he attended Buller High School before moving to Wellington. His parents were Eamon O'Connor and Kathleen Moriarty. His father was a trained priest and dairy farmer in Waimangaroa and at the 1978 and 1981 general elections was the Social Credit Party candidate for the West Coast electorate. His family are Irish Catholic with New Zealand roots in Westport, and O'Connor stated that "growing up there's a fairly healthy disrespect for the law" where he grew up.

== Police career ==
O'Connor served in the New Zealand Police for almost four decades ending his career with the rank of Senior Sergeant. In his maiden speech as an MP, he reflected on undercover operations he'd taken part in "armed with a new identity—a black leather jacket, a beard, long hair, and earrings."

He was later elected president of the New Zealand Police Association in 1995. The Police Association is the union that represents constabulary officers and Police employees. O'Connor's time as president was highly politicised; O'Connor would contribute to political debates on policing issues, particularly in regards to arming officers with firearms. O'Connor called for arming the police in New Zealand and also proposed routine arming of frontline response police officers. He retired as president in October 2016, serving a record 21 years as the Police Association's head and regarded raising the Police Association's credibility as his main achievement during his tenure.

He also spent time serving as the chair of the International Council of Police Representatives Association (ICPRA).

== Political career ==
New Zealand Parliament
Years	Term	Electorate	List	Party
2017–2020	52nd	Ōhāriu	41	Labour
2020–2023	53rd	Ōhāriu	none	Labour
2023–present	54th	Ōhāriu	none	Labour

=== 2017 general election ===
Upon his retirement from the Police Association in 2016, O'Connor was asked whether he was considering a career in politics, but he said he had no plans to do so at that time. However, on 1 February 2017 O'Connor confirmed he was seeking the Labour Party nomination for the seat of Ōhāriu in the 2017 election to challenge long-serving incumbent Peter Dunne of United Future.

O'Connor was confirmed as Labour's Ōhāriu candidate on 12 February. His candidacy and selection surprised some (it was reported he had been granted a waiver of the requirement to be a Labour member for 12 months before seeking a nomination) and was criticised on the left-wing blog The Standard. O'Connor replied that Labour was the "natural choice" for him. Dunne withdrew from the election shortly before the election and O'Connor defeated National list MP Brett Hudson to win the seat by a margin of 1,051 votes.

=== In government, 2017–2023 ===
In his first term of Parliament, O'Connor was a member of the Justice (2017–2020), Social Services and Community (2017–2018) and Finance and Expenditure (2019–2020) select committees. In July 2020 O'Connor was criticised for complaining about the reduction in MPs' salaries that was made in solidarity with other pay cuts and job losses in the early days of the COVID-19 pandemic.

During the 2020 New Zealand general election, O'Connor retained Ohāriu by a final margin of 11,961 votes. After the election he was appointed chairperson of the Transport and Infrastructure Committee (2020–2022) and as a member of the Finance and Expenditure Committee (2020–2022). With National MP Melissa Lee he is co-chair of the New Zealand/South and South East Asia Parliamentary Friendship Group. O'Connor's member's bill, the Child Protection (Child Sex Offender Government Agency Registration) (Overseas Travel Reporting) Amendment Bill which extends sex-offender travel reporting rules to overseas trips, passed its first reading on 3 August 2022.

In early August 2022, he briefly held office as a temporary Assistant Speaker of the House of Representatives to cover absences. On 25 August 2022, he was elected Deputy Speaker of the House of Representatives, succeeding Adrian Rurawhe who was elected Speaker the day prior.

=== In opposition, 2023–2026 ===
During the 2023 New Zealand general election, O'Connor retained Ohāriu by a margin of 1,260 votes, beating National list MP Nicola Willis. O'Connor became Assistant Speaker, and spokesperson for courts and veterans in the Shadow Cabinet of Chris Hipkins.

On 21 January 2026, O'Connor announced his intention to run as a list-only MP in the 2026 New Zealand general election after the Ohāriu electorate was disestablished, and after unsuccessfully campaigning for candidacy in Wellington North, with the intention of becoming Speaker of the House. The Labour party did not select him for their 2026 list.

=== Local government ===
Following the death of Wellington City Councillor Tony Randle, a by-election was set to be held in Wellington's Takapū/Northern general ward on 11 December 2026 to elect a new councillor to serve the remainder of Randle's 2025–2028 term. O'Connor confirmed that he would run in the by-election as an independent candidate, receiving support from Mayor Andrew Little. At the close of candidate nominations on 1 October 2026, O'Connor was the only candidate and as such was elected to the council unopposed.

== Political views ==
As Police Association president, O'Connor advocated for arming frontline police officers, although as he left the role he acknowledged that most police would be happy not needing to be armed. Like most MPs, he voted in favour of stricter gun control laws after the Christchurch mosque shootings. He supported the End of Life Choice Bill and first reading of the Abortion Legislation Bill in 2019, but changed his vote to oppose the Abortion Legislation Bill at the second and third readings in 2020.

== Personal life ==
O'Connor lives in Wellington with his wife Desley, and they have three children. His cousin is Labour list MP Damien O'Connor, who was formerly MP for West Coast-Tasman.

New Zealand Parliament
Preceded by Peter Dunne	Member of Parliament for Ōhāriu; 2017–present	Incumbent
