= Donna Pokere-Phillips =

New Zealand politician (born 1969/1970)

Co-Leader of the NZ Outdoors & Freedom Party
- In office 2022–2025 Serving with Sue Grey
- Preceded by: Alan Simmons

Personal details
- Born: 1969 or 1970 (age 55–56) Taranaki
- Party: NZ Outdoors & Freedom Party
- Children: 5

Donna Marie Pokere-Phillips is a New Zealand political figure and perennial candidate known for her conspiracy-driven views. She was co-leader of the NZ Outdoors & Freedom Party from 2022 to 2025.

Pokere-Phillips has been an unsuccessful candidate in general elections for the Alliance (1999), The Opportunities Party (2017), the Māori Party (2020), and "umbrella" party Freedoms NZ (2023). She was a candidate for the NZ Outdoors & Freedom Party in the 2026 election. In local politics, she has made four unsuccessful bids for seats on the Hamilton City Council, including the 2022 Hamilton mayoral election, and one for the Waikato District Council.

== Early life and education ==
Pokere-Phillips (Tainui, Ngāti Tūwharetoa, Taranaki) was born in Taranaki.

She has a Master of Laws postgraduate degree from the University of Waikato, awarded in 2004.

== Career ==
=== Alliance (1999) ===
In the 1999 election, Pokere-Phillips stood for the Alliance in the seat of Port Waikato and as number 40 on the party list. As the party only won 10 seats, and she failed to win her electorate, Pokere-Phillips was not elected.

=== The Opportunities Party (2017–2019) ===
In the 2017 election, she stood for The Opportunities Party as their candidate in the seat of Hamilton West and as number 6 on the party list. The party won no seats.

In 2018, she ran for leader of The Opportunities Party, gaining 11 of over 1000 votes cast. In a separate vote, she became the membership representative on the TOP party board.

In May 2019 she accused party leader Geoff Simmons of misleading the party about payments he was receiving, claiming in a leaked 1700-word email that the party was financially unstable. Simmons' response was that "Our Party Secretary is an accountant and he assured her that wasn’t the case. But apparently she didn’t listen." Pokere-Phillips left the party board on 12 August.

=== Te Pāti Māori (2020–2021) ===
Pokere-Phillips next joined the Māori Party (now known as Te Pāti Māori) and was selected as the party's candidate in Hauraki-Waikato for the 2020 election. When addressing the COVID-19 pandemic in New Zealand, she accused the government of "ethnic cleansing", saying that there should have been more engagement with Māori leadership during the pandemic, that rights protected under Te Tiriti o Waitangi had been denied, and that rushed legislation had eroded civil liberties. During the campaign she was arrested for trespassing, having taken part in a protest against a new roading development.

In 2021 she was quoted in the media as a legal advisor to Brian Te Huia. Te Huia, who had 396 criminal convictions at the age of 54, alleged years of abuse while he'd been a child under state care. Pokere-Phillips' motivations at the time including giving a voice to a boy who has suffered under state care, and a "sense of justice" to the man he had grown into.

She stood unsuccessfully in a by-election for the Hamilton City Council East Ward in 2021, gaining 247 of the 12,178 votes cast.

=== NZ Outdoors & Freedom Party and Freedoms NZ (2022–present) ===
In 2022, Pokere-Phillips became co-leader of the NZ Outdoors & Freedom Party alongside Sue Grey. Later that year she placed fourth in the 2022 Hamilton mayoral election and also failed to become one of the first two councillors for the city's new Maaori Ward. That December she ran for Parliament again, coming sixth in the 2022 Hamilton West by-election.

Before the 2023 general election the Outdoors & Freedom Party joined the Freedoms New Zealand umbrella party. Freedoms NZ's constituent parties ran a single candidate in each Māori seat, including Pokere-Phillips in Hauraki-Waikato. She finished third behind incumbent Nanaia Mahuta (Labour) and the successful Te Pāti Māori candidate, 21-year-old Hana-Rawhiti Maipi-Clarke, with 1,120 votes.

Pokere-Phillips was placed fourth on Freedoms NZ's joint list. They won 0.33% of the party vote, below the five percent threshold needed to enter Parliament.

In 2024 Pokere-Phillips contested a Hamilton City Council by-election for the party after one of two Kirikiriroa Maaori Ward seats was vacated by Melaina Huaki. She finished 5th of 8 candidates, with 194 votes. Maria Te Aukaha Huata was elected.

After the Outdoors and Freedom Party's 2025 AGM, it was announced that "Sue Grey continues as Leader", with no mention of Pokere-Phillips. The party listed her tenure as co-leader as ending in 2025.

In the 2025 local elections Pokere-Phillips stood in Tai Raro Takiwaa, one of two Waikato District Council (WDC) Māori Wards. Final results placed her second with 450 votes, 41 votes behind Endine Dixon-Harris. The result of the simultaneous referendum on Māori wards will see them removed from the WDC.

Pokere-Phillips stood as the Outdoors & Freedom Party's candidate in Hamilton West at the 2026 general election. She was ranked sixth on the party list. On 7 November, Pokere-Phillips came sixth place in the Hamilton West race, gaining 115 votes based on preliminary results.

=== Elections contested by Donna Pokere-Phillips ===
Election	Seat/position	Party	Result
1999 New Zealand general election	Port Waikato	Alliance	Unsuccessful
1999 New Zealand general election	List (#40)	Alliance	Unsuccessful
2017 New Zealand general election	Hamilton West	The Opportunities Party	Unsuccessful
2017 New Zealand general election	List (#6)	The Opportunities Party	Unsuccessful
2018 Opportunities Party leadership election	N/A	The Opportunities Party	Unsuccessful
2020 New Zealand general election	Hauraki-Waikato	Māori Party	Unsuccessful
2020 New Zealand general election	List (#5)	Māori Party	Unsuccessful
2021 Hamilton City Council by-election	East Ward	missing info	Unsuccessful
2022 Hamilton, New Zealand, mayoral election	N/A	NZ Outdoors & Freedom Party	Unsuccessful
2022 Hamilton City Council election	Kirikiriroa Maaori Ward	NZ Outdoors & Freedom Party	Unsuccessful
2022 Hamilton West by-election	Hamilton West	NZ Outdoors & Freedom Party	Unsuccessful
2023 New Zealand general election	Hauraki-Waikato	NZ Outdoors & Freedom Party (under Freedoms New Zealand)	Unsuccessful
2023 New Zealand general election	List (#4)	NZ Outdoors & Freedom Party (under Freedoms New Zealand)	Unsuccessful
2024 Hamilton City Council by-election	Kirikiriroa Maaori Ward	NZ Outdoors & Freedom Party	Unsuccessful
2025 Waikato District Council election	Tai Raro Takiwaa Maaori ward	missing info	Unsuccessful
2026 New Zealand general election	Hamilton West	NZ Outdoors & Freedom Party	Unsuccessful
2026 New Zealand general election	List (#6)	NZ Outdoors & Freedom Party	Unsuccessful

== Covid-19 conspiracy theories ==
During the COVID-19 pandemic, Pokere-Phillips regularly shared misinformation about vaccinations on social media, for example falsely claiming on Facebook that up to 3,000 deaths should have been attributed to the vaccination but weren't. She has also appeared on Counterspin Media, described by Radio New Zealand as a "far-right conspiracy theorist website that promotes anti-vax messages". On Counterspin she said believes that COVID-19 vaccines are "a bio-weapon that kills people" and that hospitals are "death camps". She said that she was running for mayor of Hamilton in 2022 as an act of "political utu and I want this government gone". The Waikato Times noted that she didn't share this motivation in other public forums like election debates.

In the lead-up to the 2022 New Zealand local elections, Voices for Freedom (VFF) urged members and followers to run for council positions in order to make New Zealand "ungovernable". The group advised that candidates should not declare any affiliation with VFF. When asked, Pokere-Phillips denied any affiliation with VFF.

== Personal life ==
Pokere-Phillips has lived in Hamilton with her partner and five children for over 20 years.
