= New Zealand TEA Party =

- Leader: John Hong and Susanna Kruger
- Founded: June 2020
- Dissolved: 14 September 2022
- Ideology: Anti-racism; Fiscal conservatism
- Political position: Centre
- Colours: Purple
- MPs in the House of Representatives: 0 / 120

The New Zealand TEA Party (Taxpayers and Entrepreneurs Alliance) was a registered political party in New Zealand. The party was led by John Hong. The party contested the 2020 general election, but did not win any seats.

== Policies ==
The party defined itself as anti-racist, socially democratic, and fiscally conservative. It supported reform of the Family Court of New Zealand. Party policies included support for business, opposition to capital gains taxes, embracing migration and multiculturalism, and opposition to legalisation of recreational cannabis consumption.

It had no connection to the American Tea Party movement.

== History ==
=== Foundation ===
The party was founded by two former Auckland mayoral candidates, John Hong and Susanna Kruger, and it included a third; John Palino, who ran his electorate campaign from Florida, where he was living during the COVID-19 pandemic. At its creation, the party was co-led by Hong and Kruger. The party's website described Roger Douglas as its patron.

=== 2020 general election ===
The party did not apply for a broadcasting allocation for the 2020 general election. In July 2020, the TEA Party applied to the Electoral Commission to be a registered party and it was registered on 6 August 2020. In September 2020, the TEA Party announced their candidate list for the 2020 election. Youth wing president, Dominic Hoffman Dervan was also a TEA Party list candidate and stood for the Auckland Central electorate contesting in the 2020 general election.

The party received 2,415 of the party vote, or 0.1%, in the 2020 election, and won no electorate seats, so did not enter Parliament.

=== Present status ===
The party's registration was cancelled at its request on 14 September 2022. It did not field candidates in the 2023 general election.
