= NZ Outdoors & Freedom Party =

- Secretary: Tracy Livingston
- Leader: Sue Grey
- Founded: September 2015
- Ideology: Anti-1080; Environmentalism; Anti-5G technology Anti-vaccination; Anti-lockdown
- National affiliation: Freedoms New Zealand (2023–2025)
- Colours: Green
- MPs in the House of Representatives: 0 / 120

Website
- https://freedom.kiwi/

The New Zealand Outdoors & Freedom Party, formerly known as the New Zealand Outdoors Party, is a registered political party in New Zealand. The party is led by Sue Grey.

The party's policies combine environmentalism with anti-government conspiracy theories. A minor party, it has never had a member of Parliament.

== Principles and policies ==
The Freedom Party's policy platform includes opposition to fluoridation of water, 1080 poison, vaccines, COVID-19 restrictions, and 5G technology. They support medicinal cannabis.

These newer policy positions have been added to the party's original platform, which aims to protect the environment and New Zealand's "outdoors heritage". At its launch the party advocated for clean, full and unmodified rivers, greater protection from development for the conservation estate, large game animals to be managed by all hunters for recreation and conservation benefit, removal of ecologically destructive trawling practices within the inshore fishery and a Futures Commission to determine environmental limits to the growth of population, tourism, economy and infrastructure.

== History ==
=== Creation and 2017 election ===
The New Zealand Outdoors Party was launched in September 2015 by co-leaders Alan Simmons, formerly of the United Future party, and David Haynes, president of the Association of Freshwater Anglers. The new party aimed to protect New Zealand's environment and outdoor heritage. After building up its membership over the next two years, the party was granted registration by the Electoral Commission on 11 August 2017.

In the 2017 general election the party stood candidates in Nelson, Taupō, Maungakiekie and Hutt South. The same four were also on the party list. With 0.1% of the party vote the Outdoors Party failed to win any seats in the New Zealand House of Representatives.

=== 2020: Pandemic response, protests, and election ===
==== Relationships with other minor parties ====
Following the de-registration of the Ban 1080 Party in 2017, many Ban 1080 supporters moved to the Outdoors Party. In January 2020 it was announced that the party elected anti-1080 activist Sue Grey as its co-leader. Co-founder David Haynes left the party around the same time.

In March 2020 the party formed an alliance with the Real NZ Party, resulting in the founder and leader of Real NZ, David Moffett, being appointed to the Outdoor Party's board as an executive director. Jennie Brown, an early childhood educator from Gisborne, was made a new board member at the same time. By the time of the election, Brown was standing as a candidate for the Billy Te Kahika's New Zealand Public Party (NZPP).

In April 2020 the NZPP, known for its belief in a "plandemic" conspiracy, had approached the Outdoors Party about working together but a personality clash between Te Kahika and Sue Grey prevented this. Within four months the relationship reached a point where Grey alleged that the Outdoors Party had been the target of a harassment campaign by NZPP supporters (which was now in allied with Advance New Zealand). Te Kahika called the behaviour "absolutely reprehensible" and asked his supporters not to abuse Grey, but also said that “the worst and the filthiest behaviour has actually come from Outdoors Party supporters towards the Public Party".

==== Protests, split, and election ====
In April 2020 the party criticised a nationwide lockdown (a response to the COVID-19 pandemic) as "cruel and unreasonable" as it banned hunting and other outdoor activities. They also compared the New Zealand Government to the Nazi Party.

In June 2020, at a rally in Auckland, Outdoors Party supporters claimed that the September 11 attacks were a false flag operation, promoted flat Earth theories, and denounced "mind control" and 5G technology. They also harassed and threatened a young Asian woman who wiped out chalk slogans saying "it's okay to be white" and "all lives matter". One supporter screamed at the woman to “go back to her own country”, while another said "she wasn't born here, she came here to create shit". Party co-leader Alan Simmons reprimanded the woman, saying "you shouldn't be using language like that, a little girl like you". Party member Tracy Livingston tried to ease tension, saying that the young woman was "not the enemy" and that everybody was "naturally racist". Party co-leader Sue Grey later told media that the people in the video were not members of the party, that the party did not condone their actions, and that two of the people in the incident had since apologised to her. Simmons also spoke to media afterwards, saying he had "protected the girl" from harm.

Around September 2020, at least six nominated candidates pulled out of the party. Some switched allegiance to the New Zealand Public Party or the Social Credit Party while others founded a new party called the Attica Project.

The New Zealand Outdoors Party received a broadcasting allocation of $51,821 for the 2020 election. It received 3,256 party votes, or 0.1% of the total.

=== 2022: NZ Outdoors & Freedom Party, Freedoms NZ, and by-elections ===
In April 2022 the party officially changed its name to the NZ Outdoors & Freedom Party. The next month Donna Pokere-Phillips became co-leader in place of Simmons, a position she held until 2025. Pokere-Phillips had previously stood in elections for the Māori Party (Te Pāti Māori, 2020), The Opportunities Party (TOP, 2017), and the Alliance (1999).

Sue Grey stood as the party's candidate in the 2022 Tauranga by-election, held on 18 June. She received 1,030 votes, the fourth-highest total out of 20,784 cast. (Winning candidate Sam Uffindell received 11,613.)

On 23 August 2022 The Freedoms & Rights Coalition, led by Brian Tamaki, held a protest outside Parliament. Tamaki announced that a new umbrella party, Freedoms NZ, would be formed through a union of the Outdoors & Freedom Party, Vision NZ (led by his wife Hannah), and the nascent New Nation Party. He also invited other minor parties to join. The Outdoors & Freedom Party responded that Tamaki's announcement was premature, and that they had not decided whether to join Freedoms NZ.

The first parliamentary election held after the formation of Freedoms NZ was the 2022 Hamilton West by-election. Vision NZ and Outdoors & Freedom entered separate candidates (Freedoms NZ was not a registered party at the time). Donna Pokere-Phillips, the Outdoors & Freedom co-leader, received 125 votes, less than 1% of the total.

==== 2022 local elections ====
A number of candidates in the 2022 New Zealand local elections were affiliated with the Outdoors & Freedom Party:

- Co-leader Donna Pokere-Phillips placed fourth in Hamilton's mayoral election and third in the city council's new Maaori Ward, which elected only two members.
- Party board member Aly Cook also placed fourth in her bid to be mayor of the Tasman District Council. While campaigning she said she shared values with anti-vaccination group Voices for Freedom. She also falsely claimed that the Government report, He Puapua, has come from the United Nations and that COVID-19 vaccines contained nanotechnology.
- Hine Afeaki finished fourth in Auckland's Manukau Ward, which elected two councillors. She was also an unsuccessful tenth in the Māngere-Ōtāhuhu Local Board election.

=== 2023–25: General election and Freedoms NZ ===
Changing its earlier position, the Outdoors & Freedom Party joined Freedoms NZ in May 2023. Sue Grey and Brian Tamaki were announced as co-leaders of the umbrella movement.

Parties that gained less than 1% of 2020's party vote are eligible for $66,332 in broadcast funding from the Electoral Commission. Before Outdoors & Freedom joined Freedoms NZ, the commission had signalled that this amount would be allocated to the party. Once the party joined Freedoms NZ the Commission said it was likely that Freedoms NZ would be treated as a single "group of parties" eligible for only one allocation of $66,332. Constituent parties, including Outdoors & Freedom, would not receive individual allocations. Sue Grey and Brian Tamaki began challenging the Electoral Commission in the High Court on May 31, arguing that there was no formal relationship between Freedoms NZ and Outdoors & Freedom. The New Zealand High Court dismissed the plaintiffs' claims.

A few days later, Sue Grey said that her party would "review" claims made by Counterspin, a far-right media platform with strong links to the broader "freedom" movement and a history of airing conspiracy theories, in a video that attacked Brian and Hannah Tamaki for profiting as the landlords of a Covid testing site. Amidst other simultaneous signals of disunity between anti-mandate groups, Grey also suggested that there would be room under the Freedoms NZ umbrella for more parties.

Final results from the 2023 New Zealand general election indicate that Freedoms New Zealand received 0.33% (9,586 votes) of the party vote and did not win any electorate seats, meaning it did not enter parliament. Sue Grey came seventh of nine in the West Coast-Tasman electorate.

In May 2025, Freedoms NZ was deregistered as a party and disbanded as an umbrella movement. The Outdoors and Freedom Party continues as its own entity. After its 2025 AGM, the party announced that "Sue Grey continues as Leader", with no mention of Pokere-Phillips. The party listed her tenure as co-leader as ending in 2025.

=== 2026–present: General election and attempted name change ===
In July 2026, the party applied to change their name to "Freedom" and amend their party logo. Vision NZ opposed the change due to fears that the name would confuse voters who may have thought the party was a new organisation, a successor to Freedoms NZ, or affiliated with any of the former component parties. In August, the Electoral Commission declined the application due to possible confusion with Freedoms NZ. The Outdoors and Freedom Party attempted to protest this change at the High Court, however, this failed.

During the 2026 general election, the Outdoors and Freedom Party ran 17 candidates including party leader Sue Grey. On 7 November, the party won 2,685 votes or 0.11% of the party vote based on preliminary results; below the five percent threshold needed to enter Parliament.

== List of leaders ==
No.	Name	Portrait	Term of office		No.	Name	Portrait	Term of office	
1	David Haynes		September 2015	c. October 2019 (Note: Haynes was noted as a co-leader on the party's website in September 2019, however, by October, he was no longer listed as a co-leader.)	1	Alan Simmons		September 2015	7 May 2022
2	Sue Grey		December 2019	incumbent	1	Alan Simmons		September 2015	7 May 2022
2	Sue Grey		December 2019	incumbent	2	Donna Pokere-Phillips		7 May 2022	c. August 2025

== Electoral results ==
Election	Candidates nominated		Seats won	Votes	Vote share %	Government
Election	Electorate	List	Seats won	Votes	Vote share %	Government
2017	4	4	0 / 120	1,620	0.1%	Not In Parliament
2020	26	28	0 / 120	3,256	0.1%	Not In Parliament
2023	3	N/A (Note: Contested party vote under Freedoms New Zealand.)	0 / 120	N/A	N/A	Not In Parliament
2026	11	17	0 / 120	TBD	TBD	Not In Parliament

== See also ==
- Outdoor Recreation New Zealand
