= New Zealand People's Party =

- Leader: Anil Sharma
- Founded: 2015
- Ideology: Minority rights Cultural rights
- House of Representatives: 0 / 120

Website
- Facebook

The New Zealand People's Party was a political party in New Zealand. The party was established in 2015 and had a particular focus on the rights of immigrants. It operated as an independent party for a 2016 by-election and the 2017 general election, and as a component party of Advance New Zealand for the 2020 election. The party's leader, as of September 2020, was Anil Sharma.

== History ==
=== Standalone party ===
The New Zealand People's Party was established in 2015. It was initially led by Roshan Nauhria, who was a co-founder.

Nauhria stood as a candidate in the 2016 Mount Roskill by-election, winning 709 votes or 4.2% and coming third. The People's Party also contested the 2017 Mount Albert by-election, with Vin Tomar, an early childhood teacher and real estate agent, as their candidate. Tomar received 191 votes, or 1.5% of the votes cast, coming fourth.

In 2016, New Zealand First leader Winston Peters called the party a 'National Party front'.

On 20 May 2017 the party applied for registration with the Electoral Commission and was registered by the Electoral Commission on 20 June 2017. It ran six list candidates. At the 2017 general election, the party gained only 0.1% of the party vote (1,890 votes) and won no seats in the New Zealand House of Representatives.

The party was deregistered by the Electoral Commission, at the party's request, on 30 April 2019.

=== Component party of Advance New Zealand ===
The leader of the Advance New Zealand party, Jami-Lee Ross, appeared in a Facebook video of 29 July 2020 and stated that the New Zealand People's Party would be joining with Advance. The Electoral Commission confirmed that the People's Party was a component party of Advance on 18 August. Advance New Zealand received only 1.0% of the party vote in the 2020 general election, not enough to enter Parliament, so no candidates from the People's Party were elected.

=== Current status ===
By December 2020, the People's Party was no longer recorded as a component party of Advance.

People's Party founder, Roshan Nauhria, said he would financially back Gaurav Sharma in the 2022 Hamilton West by-election, saying, "I will support him financially, 100 percent. Wholeheartedly… [it] doesn't matter the money, whatever he needs". Gaurav Sharma lost that election, coming fourth.

The People's Party did not field any candidates for the 2023 general election.

== Electoral results ==
Election	Candidates nominated		Seats won	Votes	Vote share %	Government
Election	Electorate	List	Seats won	Votes	Vote share %	Government
2017	0	6	0 / 120	1,890	0.1%	Not in Parliament
