= Ban 1080 Party =

- Leader: Bill Wallace and Mike Downard
- Founder: Bill Wallace
- Dissolved: 2018; 8 years ago
- Ideology: Opposes the use of 1080 poison

The Ban 1080 Party was a political party in New Zealand that opposed the use of sodium fluoroacetate (1080) poison, which is widely used in New Zealand for controlling mammalian pests such as possums and rats. The party was founded in 2014 by Bill Wallace and its co-leaders were Bill Wallace and Mike Downard. The party was registered by the Electoral Commission in 2014 and deregistered in February 2018.

== Policies ==
The Ban 1080 Party's stated policy was "to develop a pathway to a solution that includes the following elements:

1. To immediately stop the Department of Conservation's controlled aerial 1080 poison programme.
2. To develop a science-based, measurable programme that includes
  - Species specific protection plans,
  - Targeted pest control, using people not poison,
  - Community conservation involvement.
3. To protect all waterways by ensuring no future aerial poison drops."

The party considered that the Department of Conservation "has an important task in working to protect and preserve our natural environment", but believes that aerial 1080 drops harm native species and are ineffective at controlling rat and stoat populations.

== History ==
=== 2014 general election ===
Wallace founded the party in 2014. It applied for registration with the Electoral Commission in mid-2014 and was approved on 8 August. On 19 August 2014, the party announced a party list of nine candidates for the 2014 general election, of which five were also electorate candidates.

The party received 0.21% of the party vote (4,368), below the 5% threshold, and did not win any electorates, so did not win any seats in Parliament. Of the electoral candidates, the most successful was Pete Salter, who stood in the West Coast-Tasman electorate. He received 2,318 electoral votes, which was 6.5% of electoral votes cast and placed him fourth.

Party officials were visited by police in 2015 during their investigation into threats to contaminate baby formula with 1080. The threats were ultimately found to be unrelated to the party.

=== 2017 general election ===
The party nominated nine list candidates, including three electorate candidates, for the 2017 general election. Salter ran for the West Coast-Tasman seat again. The party gained only 0.12% of the party vote (3,005) and failed to win any seats in the New Zealand House of Representatives, causing the party to consider its future.

=== Deregistration ===
The party was deregistered by the Electoral Commission at its own request on 28 February 2018.

== Electoral results ==
| Election | Candidates nominated | | Seats won | Votes | Vote share % | Government |
| Election | Electorate | List | Seats won | Votes | Vote share % | Government |
|---|---|---|---|---|---|---|
| 2014 | 5 | 9 | 0 / 121 | 4,368 | 0.21% | Not in Parliament |
| 2017 | 3 | 9 | 0 / 120 | 3,005 | 0.12% | Not in Parliament |

== See also ==
- 1080 usage in New Zealand
- List of political parties in New Zealand
