= Candidates in the 2020 New Zealand general election by electorate =

New Zealand political candidates in the MMP era
Year	Party list	Candidates
1996	party lists	by electorate
1999	party lists	by electorate
2002	party lists	by electorate
2005	party lists	by electorate
2008	party lists	by electorate
2011	party lists	by electorate
2014	party lists	by electorate
2017	party lists	by electorate
2020	party lists	by electorate
2023	party lists	by electorate
2026	party lists	by electorate

This page lists candidates contesting electorates in the 2020 New Zealand general election.

== General electorates ==
=== Auckland Central ===
2020 general election: Auckland Central
Notes:	Blue background denotes an incumbent. Pink background denotes a current list MP. Yellow background denotes a retiring MP.			
Party	Candidate	Notes	List #	Source
Opportunities	Tuariki Delamere	NZ First/Te Tawharau MP for Te Tai Rawhiti, 1996–1999	6	
TEA	Dominic Hoffman Dervan		6	
Independent	Joshua Love	Originally selected as the Opportunities Party candidate		
NZ First	Jenny Marcroft	Contested Tāmaki in 2017	17	
National	Emma Mellow		66	
ACT	Felix Poole		50	
Independent	Chris Sadler			
New Conservative	Kevin Stitt	Contested Māngere in 2017		
Green	Chlöe Swarbrick	Contested Maungakiekie in 2017	3	
Sustainable NZ	Vernon Tava	Contested Northcote for Greens in 2011; unsuccessfully sought National nomination to contest Northcote in 2018 by-election	1	
Labour	Helen White	Contested electorate in 2017; is next on the Labour list should a vacancy occur	48	
Retiring incumbents and withdrawn candidates
ACT	Kartini Clarke			
National	Nikki Kaye	Was re-selected, but later chose to retire		

=== Banks Peninsula ===
2020 general election: Banks Peninsula
Notes:	Blue background denotes an incumbent. Pink background denotes a current list MP. Yellow background denotes a retiring MP.			
Party	Candidate	Notes	List #	Source
Opportunities	Ben Atkinson		7	
National	Catherine Chu		46	
ACT	David Fox	Contested Port Hills in 2017	30	
New Conservative	Caleb Honiss			
Labour	Tracey McLellan		53	
NZ First	Denis O'Rourke	List MP, 2011–2017; contested Port Hills in 2017	10	
Green	Eugenie Sage	Contested Port Hills in 2017	6	
Advance NZ	Tiamara Williams		5	
Retiring incumbents and withdrawn candidates
Libertarian Party NZ	Jessica Bailey	Announced, but not on final list of candidates		
Labour	Ruth Dyson			

=== Bay of Plenty ===
2020 general election: Bay of Plenty
Notes:	Blue background denotes an incumbent. Pink background denotes a current list MP. Yellow background denotes a retiring MP.			
Party	Candidate	Notes	List #	Source
ACT	Bruce Carley	Contested electorate in 2017	14	
Legalise Cannabis	Christopher Coker		11	
New Conservative	Margaret Colmore		22	
ONE	Sharon Devery		22	
Green	Pete Huggins			
Opportunities	Chris Jenkins		15	
NZ First	Tricia Lawrence		18	
Advance NZ	Angela Moncur		52	
National	Todd Muller		8	
Labour	Angie Warren-Clark	Contested electorate in 2017	35	

=== Botany ===
2020 general election: Botany
Notes:	Blue background denotes an incumbent. Pink background denotes a current list MP. Yellow background denotes a retiring MP.			
Party	Candidate	Notes	List #	Source
Labour	Naisi Chen	Contested East Coast Bays in 2017	38	
New Conservative	Dieuwe de Boer		9	
Sustainable NZ	Peter Fleming		6	
National	Christopher Luxon		61	
ACT	Damien Smith		10	
Retiring incumbents and withdrawn candidates
New Conservative	Elliot Ikilei	Contesting Takanini instead.		
Advance NZ	Jami-Lee Ross	National MP from 2011 by-election until leaving the party in 2018; initially sought to retain seat but now contesting list only		

=== Christchurch Central ===
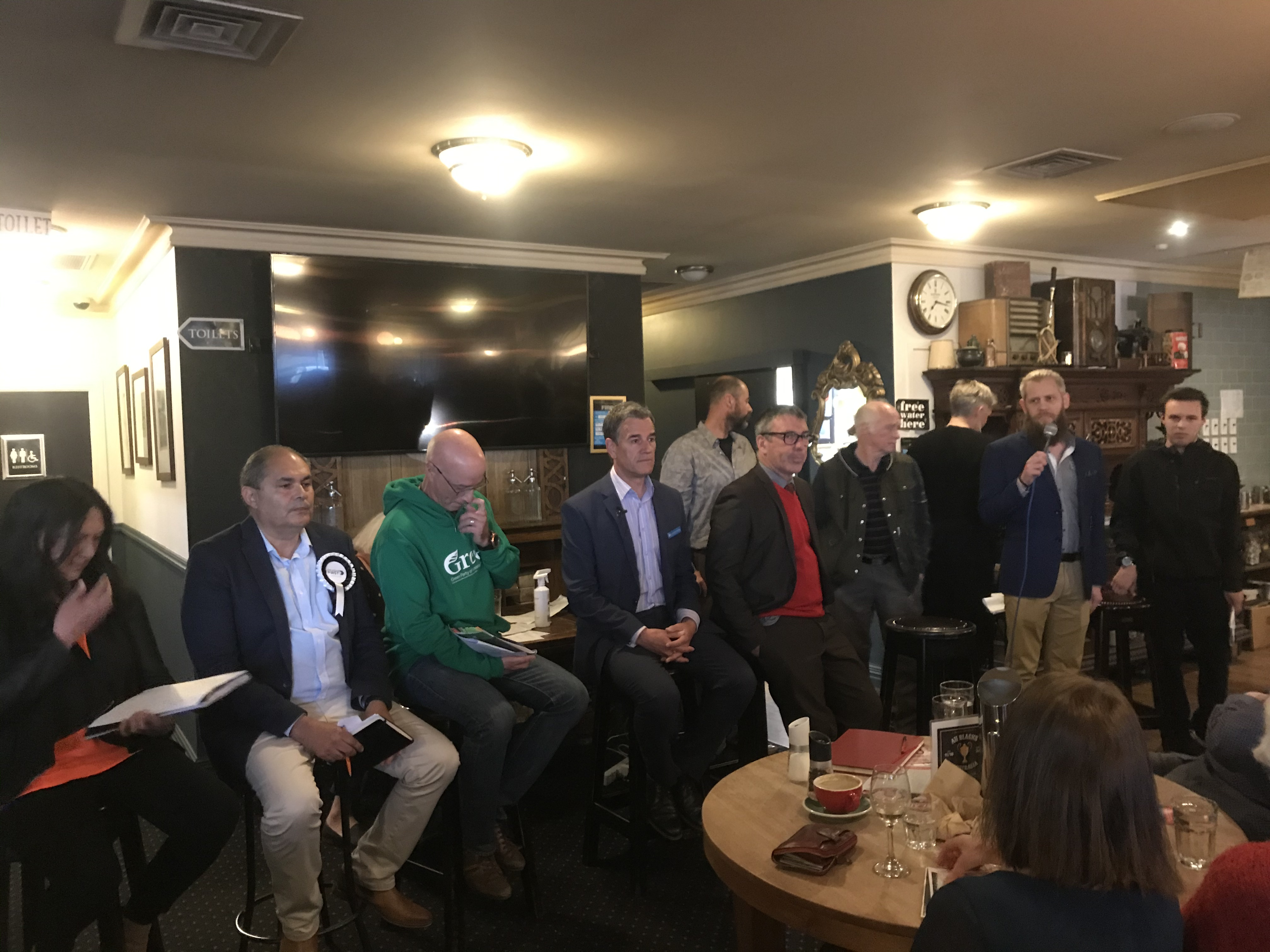
Christchurch Central candidates' meeting (from left): Carole Church (Advance NZ), Mark Arneil (NZ First), David Bennett (Green Party; candidate in the Ilam electorate who stood in for Chrys Horn), Dale Stephens (National), Duncan Webb (Labour), Michael Britnell (Legalise Cannabis), Benjamin Price (New Conservative), and Hayden Laurie (Independent)

2020 general election: Christchurch Central
Notes:	Blue background denotes an incumbent. Pink background denotes a current list MP. Yellow background denotes a retiring MP.			
Party	Candidate	Notes	List #	Source
NZ First	Mark Arneil		14	
Legalise Cannabis	Michael Britnell	Contested Christchurch East in 2011	3	
Advance NZ	Carole Church		50	
Green	Chrys Horn	Contested Selwyn in 2017	33	
ACT	Abigail Johnson		38	
Independent	Hayden Laurie			
New Conservative	Benjamin Price	Contested Waimakariri in 2017	21	
National	Dale Stephens	Contested Ohariu-Belmont in 2002	29	
Labour	Duncan Webb		43	
ONE	Ken Webb			
Retiring incumbents and withdrawn candidates
ONE	Paula Eason	Contesting Christchurch East instead		

=== Christchurch East ===
2020 general election: Christchurch East
Notes:	Blue background denotes an incumbent. Pink background denotes a current list MP. Yellow background denotes a retiring MP.			
Party	Candidate	Notes	List #	Source
Green	Nikki Berry	Contested Waimakariri in 2017	26	
ONE	Paula Eason		23	
New Conservative	Helen Houghton		6	
Legalise Cannabis	Paula Lambert	Contested electorate in 2017	4	
Advance NZ	Glen McConnell		17	
National	Lincoln Platt		53	
ACT	Toni Severin	Contested electorate in 2017	9	
Outdoors	Charlotte Staples		18	
Labour	Poto Williams		21	

=== Coromandel ===
2020 general election: Coromandel
Notes:	Blue background denotes an incumbent. Pink background denotes a current list MP. Yellow background denotes a retiring MP.			
Party	Candidate	Notes	List #	Source
Labour	Nathaniel Blomfield	Contested electorate in 2017	76	
Advance NZ	Tony Brljevich		15	
New Conservative	Michael Egleton			
Green	Pamela Grealey		32	
Outdoors	Steve Hart		19	
Opportunities	Rob Hunter		13	
ACT	David Olsen		47	
National	Scott Simpson		10	
Not A Party	Bob Wessex	Contested Wellington Central in 2017		

=== Dunedin ===
2020 general election: Dunedin
Notes:	Blue background denotes an incumbent. Pink background denotes a current list MP. Yellow background denotes a retiring MP.			
Party	Candidate	Notes	List #	Source
Social Credit	Zariah Anjaiya-Winder		15	
Green	Jack Brazil		20	
Labour	David Clark		16	
NZ First	Robert Griffith		20	
New Conservative	Solomon King			
Opportunities	Benjamin Peters		5	
ACT	Callum Steele-Macintosh		52	
National	Michael Woodhouse	Contested Dunedin North in 2017	12	
Retiring incumbents and withdrawn candidates
ONE	Stan Smith	Contesting Taieri instead		

=== East Coast ===
2020 general election: East Coast
Notes:	Blue background denotes an incumbent. Pink background denotes a current list MP. Yellow background denotes a retiring MP.			
Party	Candidate	Notes	List #	Source
Green	Meredith Akuhata-Brown			
Labour	Kiri Allan	Contested electorate in 2017	25	
Advance NZ	Jennie Brown	Initially selected as Outdoors Party candidate	16	
ONE	Veronica King		17	
New Conservative	Helena Nickerson		14	
National	Tania Tapsell		64	
ACT	Blake Webb		53	
Retiring incumbents and withdrawn candidates
National	Anne Tolley	Was planning on contesting list only, later retired completely		

=== East Coast Bays ===
2020 general election: East Coast Bays
Notes:	Blue background denotes an incumbent. Pink background denotes a current list MP. Yellow background denotes a retiring MP.			
Party	Candidate	Notes	List #	Source
Labour	Monina Hernandez		73	
Green	Daniel Jones		34	
Outdoors	Marius Koekemoer		11	
TEA	Susanna Kruger	Contested Epsom as an independent in 2014	2	
ACT	Michael McCook		44	
National	Erica Stanford		39	
New Conservative	Matthew Webster	Contested Northcote in 2014		
Retiring incumbents and withdrawn candidates
New Conservative	Dennis Knox	Initially announced but later withdrew		

=== Epsom ===
2020 general election: Epsom
Notes:	Blue background denotes an incumbent. Pink background denotes a current list MP. Yellow background denotes a retiring MP.			
Party	Candidate	Notes	List #	Source
Advance NZ	Faith-Joy Aaron		55	
Labour	Camilla Belich		30	
Opportunities	Adriana Christie		9	
National	Paul Goldsmith	Contested electorate in 2017	3	
Not A Party	Finn Harris			
TEA	Noel Jiang		5	
Green	Kyle MacDonald		14	
Outdoors	Maia Prochazka		28	
ACT	David Seymour		1	
New Conservative	Norman Sutton			
Sustainable NZ	Shannon Withers		5	

=== Hamilton East ===
2020 general election: Hamilton East
Notes:	Blue background denotes an incumbent. Pink background denotes a current list MP. Yellow background denotes a retiring MP.			
Party	Candidate	Notes	List #	Source
National	David Bennett		11	
Green	Rimu Bhooi		27	
Independent	Matt Coleman			
ACT	Myah Deedman		17	
RONZ	Jack Gielen	Contested electorate in 2017		
Advance NZ	Siggi Henry		27	
NZ First	Stu Husband	Contested Waikato in 2017	16	
New Conservative	Julie Manders			
Vision NZ	Destry Murphy		2	
Opportunities	Naomi Pocock		8	
Labour	Jamie Strange	Contested electorate in 2017	40	
Retiring incumbents and withdrawn candidates
Social Credit	Mischele Rhodes	Announced, but not on final list of candidates; also intended to contest electorate in 2017		

=== Hamilton West ===
2020 general election: Hamilton West
Notes:	Blue background denotes an incumbent. Pink background denotes a current list MP. Yellow background denotes a retiring MP.			
Party	Candidate	Notes	List #	Source
Opportunities	Hayden Cargo		20	
New Conservative	Rudi Du Plooy			
ONE	Te Rongopai Heta		34	
National	Tim Macindoe		23	
Outdoors	Chloe Mansfield		21	
Advance NZ	Cherie Ormsby-Kingi		25	
Labour	Gaurav Sharma	Contested electorate in 2017	63	
ACT	Roger Weldon		54	

=== Hutt South ===
2020 general election: Hutt South
Notes:	Blue background denotes an incumbent. Pink background denotes a current list MP. Yellow background denotes a retiring MP.			
Party	Candidate	Notes	List #	Source
Labour	Ginny Andersen	Contested electorate in 2017	45	
Outdoors	Wilf Bearman-Riedel	Contested electorate in 2017	5	
NZ First	Mahesh Bindra	List MP, 2014–2017; contested Mount Roskill in 2017	12	
National	Chris Bishop		7	
Advance NZ	Mishaela Daken	Initially selected as Outdoors Party candidate for Wellington Central	23	
New Conservative	Roger Earp		10	
Green	Richard McIntosh		23	
ACT	Andy Parkins	Contested electorate in 2017	20	
ONE	Edward Shanly		2	
Vision NZ	Paris Winiata		5	
Opportunities	Ben Wylie-van Eerd		14	

=== Ilam ===
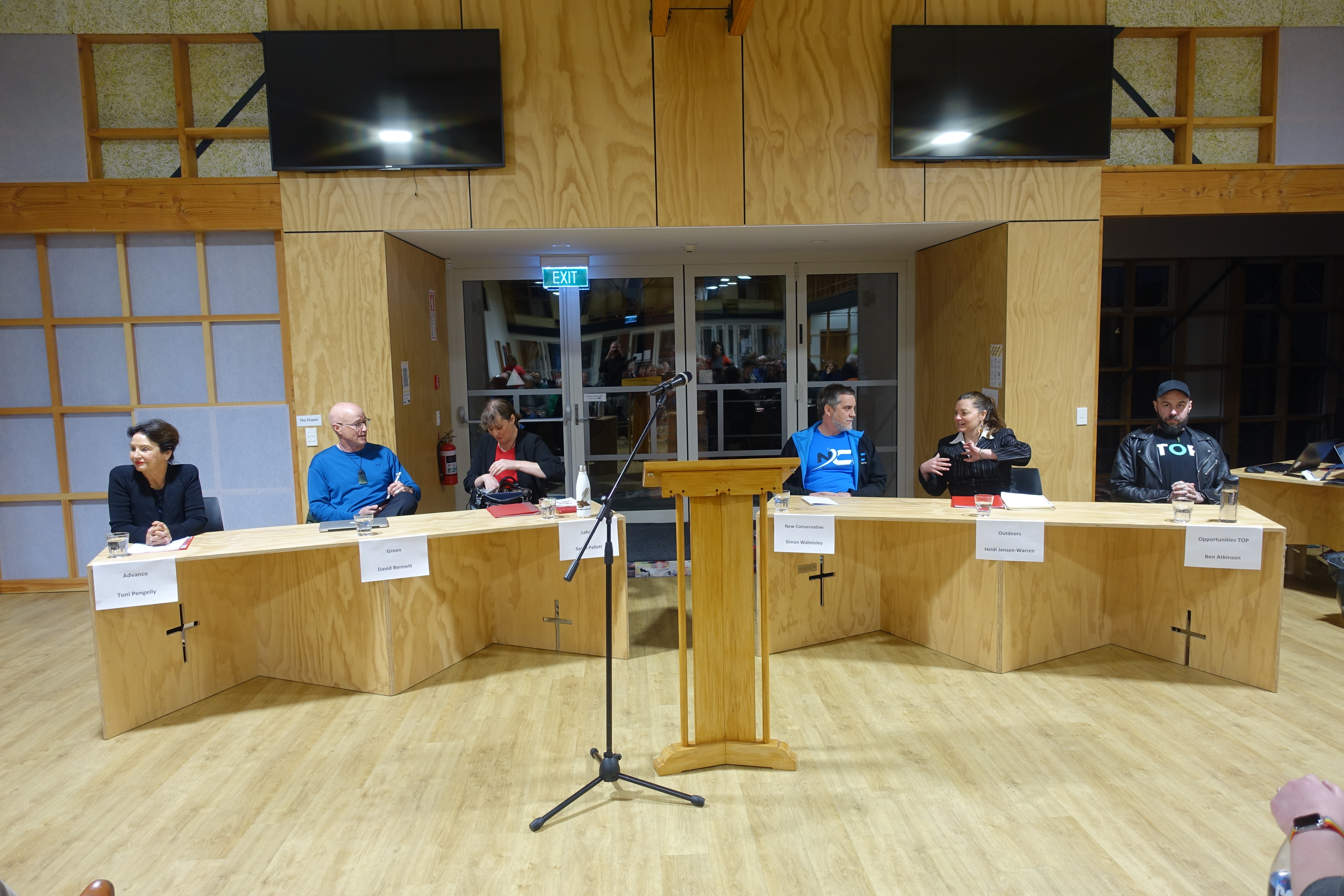
Ilam candidates' meeting (from left): Toni Pengelly (Advance NZ), David Bennett (Green), Sarah Pallett (Labour), Simon Walmisley (New Conservative), Heidi Jensen-Warren (Outdoors), and Ben Atkinson (Opportunities; standing in for the party as their Ilam candidate has withdrawn)

2020 general election: Ilam
Notes:	Blue background denotes an incumbent. Pink background denotes a current list MP. Yellow background denotes a retiring MP.			
Party	Candidate	Notes	List #	Source
Green	David Bennett			
National	Gerry Brownlee		2	
ACT	Paul Gilbert	Contested electorate in 2017	33	
Outdoors	Heidi Jensen-Warren		6	
Labour	Sarah Pallett		62	
Advance NZ	Toni Pengelly		18	
New Conservative	Simon Walmisley			
Retiring incumbents and withdrawn candidates
Legalise Cannabis	Blair Anderson	Announced, but not on final list of candidates		
Opportunities	Doug Hill	Announced, but not on final list of candidates; contested Christchurch Central in 2017		

=== Invercargill ===
2020 general election: Invercargill
Notes:	Blue background denotes an incumbent. Pink background denotes a current list MP. Yellow background denotes a retiring MP.			
Party	Candidate	Notes	List #	Source
Social Credit	Winsome Aroha		8	
Labour	Liz Craig	Contested electorate in 2017	41	
Green	Rochelle Francis	Contested electorate in 2017		
NZ First	Joshua Gunn		15	
Independent	Zy Hayden			
New Conservative	Josh Honiss			
Advance NZ	Kurt Rohloff		54	
National	Penny Simmonds		63	
Independent	Basil Walker	Initially selected as ACT candidate for Southland		
ONE	Jackie West		14	
Retiring incumbents and withdrawn candidates
National	Sarah Dowie	Was re-selected, but later chose to retire		

=== Kaikōura ===
2020 general election: Kaikōura
Notes:	Blue background denotes an incumbent. Pink background denotes a current list MP. Yellow background denotes a retiring MP.			
Party	Candidate	Notes	List #	Source
NZ First	Jamie Arbuckle	Contested electorate in 2017	13	
Money Free Party	Prince Bhavik			
ACT	Richard Evans	Contested electorate in 2017	27	
Labour	Matt Flight		78	
New Conservative	David Greenslade	Contested electorate in 2017		
Independent	Ted Howard	Contested electorate for Money Free in 2014		
Social Credit	John McCaskey	Contested electorate in 2017	22	
Green	Richard McCubbin	Contested electorate in 2017	35	
ONE	Don Moore	Contested electorate for Christian Heritage in 2002	7	
Outdoors	Darlene Morgan		4	
Advance NZ	Lisa Romana		57	
National	Stuart Smith		32	

=== Kaipara ki Mahurangi ===
2020 general election: Kaipara ki Mahurangi
Notes:	Blue background denotes an incumbent. Pink background denotes a current list MP. Yellow background denotes a retiring MP.			
Party	Candidate	Notes	List #	Source
New Conservative	Pauline Berry			
Green	Zephyr Brown		28	
Independent	David Ford			
ACT	Beth Houlbrooke	Contested Rodney in 2014	12	
Labour	Marja Lubeck	Contested Rodney in 2017	34	
Social Credit	Callan Neylon		11	
National	Chris Penk		41	
ONE	Richard Reeves		35	
NZ First	Brenda Steele		26	

=== Kelston ===
2020 general election: Kelston
Notes:	Blue background denotes an incumbent. Pink background denotes a current list MP. Yellow background denotes a retiring MP.			
Party	Candidate	Notes	List #	Source
National	Bala Beeram	Contested electorate in 2017	52	
Trump New Zealand Party	Kevin Brett			
NZ First	Anne Degia-Pala	Contested electorate in 2017	24	
Green	Jessamine Fraser			
Social Credit	Jason Jobsis	Contested Tauranga in 2017	6	
Advance NZ	Maureen Kumeroa		43	
ONE	Faye Lavaka Tangipa		13	
Legalise Cannabis	Jeff Lye	Contested electorate in 2017	9	
ACT	Matthew Percival		48	
Labour	Carmel Sepuloni		8	
New Conservative	Leao Tildsley			

=== Mana ===
2020 general election: Mana
Notes:	Blue background denotes an incumbent. Pink background denotes a current list MP. Yellow background denotes a retiring MP.			
Party	Candidate	Notes	List #	Source
New Conservative	Roy Barry	Contested electorate in 2014		
Integrity	Helen Cartwright			
Labour	Barbara Edmonds		49	
Not A Party	Richard Goode	Contested electorate in 2017		
ONE	Stephanie Harawira		1	
National	Jo Hayes	Contested Christchurch East in 2017	44	
Attica	Mike Iles			
Green	Jan Logie	Contested electorate in 2017	5	
Independent	Gordon Marshall	Contested electorate in 2017		
Advance NZ	Edward Ponder		61	
Progressive Aotearoa	Michael Walker			
Retiring incumbents and withdrawn candidates
Labour	Kris Faafoi	Contesting list only		

=== Māngere ===
2020 general election: Māngere
Notes:	Blue background denotes an incumbent. Pink background denotes a current list MP. Yellow background denotes a retiring MP.			
Party	Candidate	Notes	List #	Source
New Conservative	Fuiavailili Ala'ilima		18	
Social Credit	Grant Crowther		20	
Climate First	Leslie Jones	Contested Auckland Central in 2017		
National	Agnes Loheni	Contested electorate in 2017	28	
Independent	Wayne Tetou Nooroa			
Labour	Aupito William Sio		20	
Green	Peter Sykes			
Retiring incumbents and withdrawn candidates
Advance NZ	Juricz Blackman	Announced, but not on final list of candidates		

=== Manurewa ===
2020 general election: Manurewa
Notes:	Blue background denotes an incumbent. Pink background denotes a current list MP. Yellow background denotes a retiring MP.			
Party	Candidate	Notes	List #	Source
TEA	Wella Bernardo		9	
NZ First	John Hall	Contested electorate in 2017	25	
Advance NZ	Linda Jackson		53	
Independent	Luella Linaker			
New Conservative	Mote Pahulu			
National	Nuwanthie Samarakone	Following selection, unsuccessfully sought to be selected in Auckland Central instead	55	
ONE	Rattan Singh		20	
Green	Lourdes Vano		15	
Communist League	Annalucia Vermunt	Contested Manukau East in 2014		
Vision NZ	Sonny Wilcox		3	
Labour	Arena Williams	Contested Hunua in 2014	58	
Retiring incumbents and withdrawn candidates
ONE	Stephanie Harawira	Contesting Mana instead		
ACT	Dave King	Contesting Port Waikato instead	19	
Labour	Louisa Wall	Contesting list only after withdrawing from selection process		

=== Maungakiekie ===
2020 general election: Maungakiekie
Notes:	Blue background denotes an incumbent. Pink background denotes a current list MP. Yellow background denotes a retiring MP.			
Party	Candidate	Notes	List #	Source
ACT	Tommy Fergusson	Contested Mount Albert in 2014	28	
New Conservative	Philip Holder			
National	Denise Lee		34	
Green	Ricardo Menéndez March	Contested Mount Roskill in 2017	10	
Labour	Priyanca Radhakrishnan	Contested electorate in 2017	31	

=== Mount Albert ===
2020 general election: Mount Albert
Notes:	Blue background denotes an incumbent. Pink background denotes a current list MP. Yellow background denotes a retiring MP.			
Party	Candidate	Notes	List #	Source
Labour	Jacinda Ardern		1	
National	Melissa Lee	Contested electorate in 2017	16	
Opportunities	Cameron Lord		12	
New Conservative	Daniel Reurich			
Human Rights Party	Anthony van den Heuvel	Contested electorate in 2017		
Green	Luke Wijohn		18	
Retiring incumbents and withdrawn candidates
Public	Jeanette Wilson			

=== Mount Roskill ===
2020 general election: Mount Roskill
Notes:	Blue background denotes an incumbent. Pink background denotes a current list MP. Yellow background denotes a retiring MP.			
Party	Candidate	Notes	List #	Source
TEA	Vishal Choksi		8	
Voice of the People	Warwick Frederikson			
Green	Golriz Ghahraman	Contested Te Atatū in 2017	7	
Social Credit	Cliff Hall		3	
New Conservative	Alister Hood			
ACT	Chris Johnston		39	
National	Parmjeet Parmar	Contested electorate in 2017	27	
ONE	Charlene Pehi		28	
Advance NZ	Anil Sharma		7	
Labour	Michael Wood		23	

=== Napier ===
2020 general election: Napier
Notes:	Blue background denotes an incumbent. Pink background denotes a current list MP. Yellow background denotes a retiring MP.			
Party	Candidate	Notes	List #	Source
New Conservative	Deborah Burnside	Sought National nomination in 2017	11	
Green	James Crow		21	
Independent	Ian Gaskin	Contested Christchurch Central for United Future in 2017		
ACT	Judy Kendall		41	
Labour	Stuart Nash		12	
National	Katie Nimon		45	
Independent	John Smith			

=== Nelson ===
2020 general election: Nelson
Notes:	Blue background denotes an incumbent. Pink background denotes a current list MP. Yellow background denotes a retiring MP.			
Party	Candidate	Notes	List #	Source
ACT	Chris Baillie		4	
Labour	Rachel Boyack	Contested electorate in 2017	57	
ONE	Deon Claassens		3	
Progressive Aotearoa	Bruce Dyer			
Outdoors	Sue Grey		1	
New Conservative	Simon Gutschlag	Contested electorate in 2017		
Advance NZ	Ben Harris		9	
Opportunities	Mathew Pottinger		4	
National	Nick Smith		18	
Green	Aaron Stallard		41	

=== New Lynn ===
2020 general election: New Lynn
Notes:	Blue background denotes an incumbent. Pink background denotes a current list MP. Yellow background denotes a retiring MP.			
Party	Candidate	Notes	List #	Source
Green	Steve Abel	Contested Māngere in 2002	11	
ACT	Shawn Blanchfield		24	
Voice of the People	Paul Davie	Contested electorate for Conservatives in 2017		
Social Credit	Lisa Er	Contested Mount Roskill for Greens in 2008	13	
NZ First	Robert Gore		19	
ONE	Khurram Malik		29	
New Conservative	Victoria O'Brien		3	
Advance NZ	Steve Oliver		49	
TEA	Smitaben Patel		11	
Labour	Deborah Russell		33	
National	Lisa Whyte		49	
Retiring incumbents and withdrawn candidates
ONE	Carolyn Shanly			

=== New Plymouth ===
2020 general election: New Plymouth
Notes:	Blue background denotes an incumbent. Pink background denotes a current list MP. Yellow background denotes a retiring MP.			
Party	Candidate	Notes	List #	Source
Labour	Glen Bennett		72	
New Conservative	Murray Chong	Contested electorate for NZ First in 2017	13	
Independent	Rusty Kane	Contested Tauranga in 2017		
Social Credit	Kath Lauderdale		5	
Opportunities	Dan Thurston-Crow	Contested Mount Albert in 2017	19	
Advance NZ	Rowena Wood		42	
ACT	Ada Xiao		57	
National	Jonathan Young		22	

=== North Shore ===
2020 general election: North Shore
Notes:	Blue background denotes an incumbent. Pink background denotes a current list MP. Yellow background denotes a retiring MP.			
Party	Candidate	Notes	List #	Source
New Conservative	Mike Brewer		12	
Outdoors	Sue Dick		23	
Sustainable NZ	Mari Huusko		2	
Opportunities	Shai Navot		2	
Advance NZ	Megan Osborn		41	
Green	Liz Rawlings		38	
Labour	Romy Udanga	Contested electorate in 2017	70	
National	Simon Watts		65	
Retiring incumbents and withdrawn candidates
National	Maggie Barry			
ONE	Edward Shanly	Contesting Hutt South instead		

=== Northcote ===
2020 general election: Northcote
Notes:	Blue background denotes an incumbent. Pink background denotes a current list MP. Yellow background denotes a retiring MP.			
Party	Candidate	Notes	List #	Source
National	Dan Bidois		43	
New Conservative	Bill Dyet			
Green	Natasha Fairley			
Labour	Shanan Halbert	Contested electorate in 2017 and 2018 by-election	51	
ACT	Tim Kronfeld	Contested electorate in 2017	43	
Sustainable NZ	Bevan Read		11	
Outdoors	Lynn Usmani		27	

=== Northland ===
2020 general election: Northland
Notes:	Blue background denotes an incumbent. Pink background denotes a current list MP. Yellow background denotes a retiring MP.			
Party	Candidate	Notes	List #	Source
New Conservative	Trevor Barfoote			
ACT	Mark Cameron		8	
Social Credit	Brad Flutey	Initially selected as Outdoors Party candidate	18	
Opportunities	Helen Jeremiah		21	
NZ First	Shane Jones	Contested Whangārei in 2017	4	
National	Matt King		40	
Outdoors	Michele Mitcalfe		17	
Advance NZ	Nathan Mitchell		14	
Labour	Willow-Jean Prime	Contested electorate in 2017	36	
Independent	Mike Shaw			
Green	Darleen Tana		42	
Harmony Network NZ	Sophia Xiao-Colley			
Retiring incumbents and withdrawn candidates
New Conservative	Melanie Taylor	Announced, but not on final list of candidates		

=== Ōhāriu ===
2020 general election: Ōhāriu
Notes:	Blue background denotes an incumbent. Pink background denotes a current list MP. Yellow background denotes a retiring MP.			
Party	Candidate	Notes	List #	Source
ONE	Allan Cawood		6	
ACT	Sean Fitzpatrick	Contested electorate in 2014	29	
Opportunities	Jessica Hammond	Contested electorate in 2017	3	
National	Brett Hudson	Contested electorate in 2017	36	
New Conservative	Philip Lynch	Contested Rimutaka in 2017		
NZ First	Tracey Martin	Contested Rodney in 2017	3	
Labour	Greg O'Connor		none	
Green	John Ranta		16	
Advance NZ	Jolene Smith		32	
Not A Party	Liam Walsh	Contested Northcote in 2018 by-election		

=== Ōtaki ===
2020 general election: Ōtaki
Notes:	Blue background denotes an incumbent. Pink background denotes a current list MP. Yellow background denotes a retiring MP.			
Party	Candidate	Notes	List #	Source
National	Tim Costley		59	
New Conservative	Martin Frauenstein	Contested Ilam in 2017	20	
ACT	Wayne Grattan	Contested electorate in 2017	35	
Attica	Michael Kay	Initially selected as Outdoors Party candidate		
Green	Bernard Long			
Labour	Terisa Ngobi		65	
ONE	Pisa Seala		33	
Social Credit	Amanda Vickers	Contested electorate as an independent in 2014	2	
Retiring incumbents and withdrawn candidates
Public	Michael Feyen			
National	Nathan Guy			

=== Pakuranga ===
2020 general election: Pakuranga
Notes:	Blue background denotes an incumbent. Pink background denotes a current list MP. Yellow background denotes a retiring MP.			
Party	Candidate	Notes	List #	Source
National	Simeon Brown		37	
Labour	Nerissa Henry		77	
ACT	Mo Yee Poon		51	
New Conservative	Ian Sampson			
Sustainable NZ	Rachel Wood		4	
Green	Lawrence Xu-Nan		17	
Retiring incumbents and withdrawn candidates
ACT	Stephen Berry	Contested East Coast Bays in 2017; withdrew for health reasons	9	

=== Palmerston North ===
2020 general election: Palmerston North
Notes:	Blue background denotes an incumbent. Pink background denotes a current list MP. Yellow background denotes a retiring MP.			
Party	Candidate	Notes	List #	Source
NZ First	Darroch Ball	Contested electorate in 2017	6	
Advance NZ	Sharon Lyon		10	
ACT	Jack Phillips		49	
New Conservative	David Poppelwell			
Green	Teanau Tuiono	Contested Manurewa in 2017	8	
Labour	Tangi Utikere	Unsuccessfully sought Labour nomination for electorate in 2008	none	
National	William Wood		54	
Retiring incumbents and withdrawn candidates
Labour	Iain Lees-Galloway	Initially re-selected but later chose to retire after losing his ministerial status		

=== Panmure-Ōtāhuhu ===
2020 general election: Panmure-Ōtāhuhu
Notes:	Blue background denotes an incumbent. Pink background denotes a current list MP. Yellow background denotes a retiring MP.			
Party	Candidate	Notes	List #	Source
National	Kanwaljit Singh Bakshi	Contested Manukau East in 2017	24	
Outdoors	Phil Bridge		15	
Communist League	Patrick Brown	Contested Mount Roskill in 2011		
New Conservative	Ted Johnston	Contested Manukau East in 2017 for The Opportunities Party		
Advance NZ	Bryn Jones		38	
Labour	Jenny Salesa		13	
Green	Mark Simiona		40	

=== Papakura ===
2020 general election: Papakura
Notes:	Blue background denotes an incumbent. Pink background denotes a current list MP. Yellow background denotes a retiring MP.			
Party	Candidate	Notes	List #	Source
New Conservative	David Arvidson			
National	Judith Collins		1	
Green	Sue Cowie			
Labour	Anahila Kanongata'a-Suisuiki		44	
NZ First	Robert Monds		27	
Advance NZ	Vikki-Lee Pomare		29	
Outdoors	Teena Smith		25	
ACT	Bruce Whitehead	Contested Hunua for Libertarianz in 2008	55	
Retiring incumbents and withdrawn candidates
Outdoors	Mark Ford			
ONE	Lawrence Sami	Announced, but not on final list of candidates		

=== Port Waikato ===
2020 general election: Port Waikato
Notes:	Blue background denotes an incumbent. Pink background denotes a current list MP. Yellow background denotes a retiring MP.			
Party	Candidate	Notes	List #	Source
Heartland	Mark Ball	Former Franklin District mayor	1	
National	Andrew Bayly		17	
Independent	Ian Cummings	Contested Hunua in 2017		
ONE	Ian Johnson		4	
Labour	Baljit Kaur	Contested Hunua in 2017	none	
ACT	Dave King		19	
Advance NZ	Jamie Macgregor		36	
Independent	Nick Pak			
Outdoors	Lucille Rutherfurd		14	
New Conservative	Steven Senn			
Green	Bill Wilson			
Retiring incumbents and withdrawn candidates
Outdoors	Steve Hart	Contesting Auckland Central instead.		
ACT	Niko Kloeten	Announced, but not on final list of candidates		

=== Rangitata ===
2020 general election: Rangitata
Notes:	Blue background denotes an incumbent. Pink background denotes a current list MP. Yellow background denotes a retiring MP.			
Party	Candidate	Notes	List #	Source
New Conservative	Lachie Ashton		4	
Social Credit	Brannon Favel		9	
National	Megan Hands		67	
ACT	Hamish Hutton		37	
Outdoors	Grant Kelynack		12	
Green	Gerrie Ligtenberg	Contested electorate in 2011	24	
Labour	Jo Luxton	Contested electorate in 2017	39	
Advance NZ	Aroha Maru		51	
Not A Party	James Rae			
Retiring incumbents and withdrawn candidates
National	Andrew Falloon	Was re-selected, but later resigned from Parliament		
Libertarian Party NZ	Leonard Wright	Announced, but not on final list of candidates		

=== Rangitīkei ===
2020 general election: Rangitīkei
Notes:	Blue background denotes an incumbent. Pink background denotes a current list MP. Yellow background denotes a retiring MP.			
Party	Candidate	Notes	List #	Source
Advance NZ	Ricky Cribb		26	
New Conservative	Reuben Leung Wai			
National	Ian McKelvie		38	
Labour	Soraya Peke-Mason	Contested Te Tai Hauāuru in 2011	60	
Green	Ali Hale Tilley		43	
ACT	Neil Wilson	Contested electorate in 2017	56	
NZ First	Antony Woollams		28	
Retiring incumbents and withdrawn candidates
New Conservative	Cedric Backhouse	Initially announced, but later withdrew		
Green	Joe Boon	Withdrew candidacy due to illness		

=== Remutaka ===
2020 general election: Remutaka
Notes:	Blue background denotes an incumbent. Pink background denotes a current list MP. Yellow background denotes a retiring MP.			
Party	Candidate	Notes	List #	Source
National	Mark Crofskey		56	
ONE	Frank Eijgenraam		8	
Labour	Chris Hipkins		6	
NZ First	Talani Meikle	Contested electorate in 2017	8	
Green	Chris Norton		36	
ACT	Grae O'Sullivan	Contested electorate in 2017	16	
New Conservative	Hank Optland			
Advance NZ	Michael Stace		4	

=== Rongotai ===
2020 general election: Rongotai
Notes:	Blue background denotes an incumbent. Pink background denotes a current list MP. Yellow background denotes a retiring MP.			
Party	Candidate	Notes	List #	Source
NZ First	Taylor Arneil		23	
Green	Teall Crossen	Contested electorate in 2017	12	
Labour	Paul Eagle		47	
Independent	Don McDonald			
ACT	Nicole McKee		3	
Integrity	Troy Mihaka			
National	David Patterson		48	
Opportunities	Geoff Simmons	Contested Wellington Central in 2017	1	
New Conservative	Bruce Welsh	Contested electorate in 2017	17	

=== Rotorua ===
2020 general election: Rotorua
Notes:	Blue background denotes an incumbent. Pink background denotes a current list MP. Yellow background denotes a retiring MP.			
Party	Candidate	Notes	List #	Source
ACT	Pete Kirkwood		42	
Labour	Claire Mahon		74	
National	Todd McClay		6	
New Conservative	Alan Tāne Solomon		8	
Green	Kaya Sparke		19	
NZ First	Fletcher Tabuteau	Contested electorate in 2017	2	
ONE	Karri-Ann Vercoe		5	
Advance NZ	Kiri Ward		13	

=== Selwyn ===
2020 general election: Selwyn
Notes:	Blue background denotes an incumbent. Pink background denotes a current list MP. Yellow background denotes a retiring MP.			
Party	Candidate	Notes	List #	Source
ACT	Stu Armstrong		22	
Labour	Reuben Davidson		67	
National	Nicola Grigg		60	
Advance NZ	Jerry Larason		30	
New Conservative	Bronnie Lyell		19	
Green	Abe O'Donnell		37	
Independent	Calvin Payne			
Retiring incumbents and withdrawn candidates
National	Amy Adams	Cancelled planned retirement from Parliament to seek place on party list; later returned to original plan		
Libertarian Party NZ	Chris Perry	Announced, but not on final list of candidates		

=== Southland ===
2020 general election: Southland
Notes:	Blue background denotes an incumbent. Pink background denotes a current list MP. Yellow background denotes a retiring MP.			
Party	Candidate	Notes	List #	Source
Social Credit	Elisabeth Dacker		12	
Green	David Kennedy	Contested Invercargill in 2014		
New Conservative	Fiona Meyer			
Labour	Jon Mitchell		75	
National	Joseph Mooney		62	
Opportunities	Joel Rowlands		17	
ONE	Judith Terrill		15	
Advance NZ	Robert Wilson		45	
Retiring incumbents and withdrawn candidates
ACT	Basil Walker	Contesting Invercargill as an independent instead		
National	Hamish Walker	Was re-selected, but later resigned		

=== Taieri ===
2020 general election: Taieri
Notes:	Blue background denotes an incumbent. Pink background denotes a current list MP. Yellow background denotes a retiring MP.			
Party	Candidate	Notes	List #	Source
ACT	Robert Andrews		21	
New Conservative	Ally Kelleher			
National	Liam Kernaghan		51	
Labour	Ingrid Leary		59	
Independent	Olivier Lequeux			
NZ First	Mark Patterson	Contested Clutha-Southland in 2017	7	
Advance NZ	Fred Roberts		60	
ONE	Stan Smith		9	
Social Credit	Warren Voight	Contested Dunedin North for NZ First in 2017	7	
Independent	David Webber			
Green	Scott Willis		13	
Retiring incumbents and withdrawn candidates
Labour	Clare Curran			
ONE	Alex McLaughlin			

=== Takanini ===
2020 general election: Takanini
Notes:	Blue background denotes an incumbent. Pink background denotes a current list MP. Yellow background denotes a retiring MP.			
Party	Candidate	Notes	List #	Source
TEA	John Hong		1	
New Conservative	Elliot Ikilei	Contested Manurewa in 2017	2	
Advance NZ	Mitesh Kagathra		44	
Labour	Neru Leavasa		52	
ACT	Mike McCormick		45	
National	Rima Nakhle		50	
Vision NZ	George Ngatai	Contested Tāmaki Makaurau for National in 2002	4	
Retiring incumbents and withdrawn candidates
ONE	Edward Shanly	Contesting Hutt South instead		

=== Tāmaki ===
2020 general election: Tāmaki
Notes:	Blue background denotes an incumbent. Pink background denotes a current list MP. Yellow background denotes a retiring MP.			
Party	Candidate	Notes	List #	Source
Green	Sylvia Boys			
Labour	Shirin Brown		79	
ACT	Carmel Claridge		13	
National	Simon O'Connor		35	
New Conservative	Paul Sommer			
Advance NZ	Sarai TePou		58	

=== Taranaki-King Country ===
2020 general election: Taranaki-King Country
Notes:	Blue background denotes an incumbent. Pink background denotes a current list MP. Yellow background denotes a retiring MP.			
Party	Candidate	Notes	List #	Source
Outdoors	Chris Grey		24	
National	Barbara Kuriger		20	
ACT	Brent Miles		46	
Labour	Angela Roberts		50	
New Conservative	Lee Smith		16	

=== Taupō ===
2020 general election: Taupō
Notes:	Blue background denotes an incumbent. Pink background denotes a current list MP. Yellow background denotes a retiring MP.			
Party	Candidate	Notes	List #	Source
Labour	Ala' Al-Bustanji	Contested electorate in 2017	71	
ONE	Gary Coffin		18	
Outdoors	Micheal Downard	Contested Coromandel for Ban 1080 in 2014	8	
ACT	David Freeman		31	
Green	Danna Glendining	Contested Wellington Central for Alliance in 1996	31	
Advance NZ	Antoinette James		46	
New Conservative	Jan-Marie Quinn			
National	Louise Upston		9	
Retiring incumbents and withdrawn candidates
Outdoors	Alan Simmons	Contested electorate in 2017		

=== Tauranga ===
2020 general election: Tauranga
Notes:	Blue background denotes an incumbent. Pink background denotes a current list MP. Yellow background denotes a retiring MP.			
Party	Candidate	Notes	List #	Source
National	Simon Bridges		4	
Opportunities	Andrew Caie		16	
Independent	James Capamagian			
Green	Josh Cole		30	
Advance NZ	Daniel Crosa		59	
NZ First	Erika Harvey		11	
New Conservative	Paul Hignett		15	
Independent	Yvette Lamare	Contested electorate in 2017		
Outdoors	Tracy Livingston	Intended to contest Bay of Plenty for Democrats in 2017	3	
ACT	Cameron Luxton		15	
Labour	Jan Tinetti	Contested electorate in 2017	32	

=== Te Atatū ===
2020 general election: Te Atatū
Notes:	Blue background denotes an incumbent. Pink background denotes a current list MP. Yellow background denotes a retiring MP.			
Party	Candidate	Notes	List #	Source
TEA	Frank Amoah		10	
ACT	Simon Court		5	
Green	Scott Hindman			
Opportunities	Brendon Monk		10	
National	Alfred Ngaro	Contested electorate in 2017	30	
New Conservative	Okusitino Paseka			
Labour	Phil Twyford		4	

=== Tukituki ===
2020 general election: Tukituki
Notes:	Blue background denotes an incumbent. Pink background denotes a current list MP. Yellow background denotes a retiring MP.			
Party	Candidate	Notes	List #	Source
ACT	Jan Daffern		25	
Labour	Anna Lorck	Contested electorate in 2017	none	
Legalise Cannabis	Romana Manning		8	
New Conservative	Nick McMinn-Collard			
Green	Chris Perley	Contested electorate in 2017		
Advance NZ	Carl Peterson	Contested Rotorua for ACT in 2005	37	
ONE	Melanie Petrowski		25	
Future Youth	Allister Tosh	Contested electorate in 2017		
National	Lawrence Yule		33	

=== Upper Harbour ===
2020 general election: Upper Harbour
Notes:	Blue background denotes an incumbent. Pink background denotes a current list MP. Yellow background denotes a retiring MP.			
Party	Candidate	Notes	List #	Source
National	Jake Bezzant		57	
ACT	Karen Chhour		7	
Outdoors	Catherine Giorza		7	
Green	Ryan Nicholls			
New Conservative	Bernadette Soares		7	
TEA	Winson Tan		3	
Sustainable NZ	Dion Thomas		10	
Advance NZ	Peter Vaughn		35	
Labour	Vanushi Walters		22	
Retiring incumbents and withdrawn candidates
National	Paula Bennett	Was planning on contesting list only, later retired completely		

=== Waikato ===
2020 general election: Waikato
Notes:	Blue background denotes an incumbent. Pink background denotes a current list MP. Yellow background denotes a retiring MP.			
Party	Candidate	Notes	List #	Source
New Conservative	Caleb Ansell			
Labour	Kerrin Leoni		66	
ACT	James McDowall	Contested Hamilton East in 2017	6	
National	Tim van de Molen		42	
Retiring incumbents and withdrawn candidates
Advance NZ	Craig Taylor	Announced, but not on final list of candidates	22	

=== Waimakariri ===
2020 general election: Waimakariri
Notes:	Blue background denotes an incumbent. Pink background denotes a current list MP. Yellow background denotes a retiring MP.			
Party	Candidate	Notes	List #	Source
New Conservative	Leighton Baker	Contested Epsom in 2017	1	
ACT	James Davies		26	
National	Matt Doocey		31	
Sustainable NZ	John Hyndman		3	
Social Credit	Lawrence McIsaac		10	
Advance NZ	Shelley Richardson		47	
Labour	Dan Rosewarne	Contested electorate in 2017	56	
Independent	Bjorn Sadler			
Retiring incumbents and withdrawn candidates
ONE	Nikita McCausland	Announced, but not on final list of candidates		

=== Wairarapa ===
2020 general election: Wairarapa
Notes:	Blue background denotes an incumbent. Pink background denotes a current list MP. Yellow background denotes a retiring MP.			
Party	Candidate	Notes	List #	Source
National	Mike Butterick		58	
New Conservative	Warren Butterworth		24	
Advance NZ	Nigel Gray		28	
ACT	Roger Greenslade	Contested electorate in 2017	36	
Independent	Aileen Haeata			
NZ First	Ron Mark	Contested electorate in 2017	5	
Labour	Kieran McAnulty	Contested electorate in 2017	26	
Green	Celia Wade-Brown	Former Wellington mayor; contested Rongotai in 2002		
Retiring incumbents and withdrawn candidates
National	Alastair Scott			

=== Waitaki ===
2020 general election: Waitaki
Notes:	Blue background denotes an incumbent. Pink background denotes a current list MP. Yellow background denotes a retiring MP.			
Party	Candidate	Notes	List #	Source
New Conservative	Troy Allan			
ACT	Sean Beamish		23	
National	Jacqui Dean		14	
Green	Sampsa Kiuru			
Sustainable NZ	Brian Mowat-Gainsford		7	
NZ First	Anthony Odering		22	
Advance NZ	Heather Meri Pennycook		21	
Independent	Daniel Shand			
Labour	Liam Wairepo		80	
Retiring incumbents and withdrawn candidates
New Conservative	Sue Baker	Initially announced, but later withdrew		

=== Wellington Central ===
2020 general election: Wellington Central
Notes:	Blue background denotes an incumbent. Pink background denotes a current list MP. Yellow background denotes a retiring MP.			
Party	Candidate	Notes	List #	Source
Legalise Cannabis	Michael Appleby	Contested electorate in 2011	1	
Outdoors	Robert Bruce		26	
Opportunities	Abe Gray	Contested Dunedin North in 2017	11	
Advance NZ	Rose Greally		48	
Independent	Jesse Richardson			
New Conservative	Liam Richfield			
Labour	Grant Robertson		3	
Green	James Shaw	Contested electorate in 2017	2	
ONE	Gina Sunderland		10	
ACT	Brooke van Velden	Contested Auckland Central in 2017	2	
National	Nicola Willis	Contested electorate in 2017	13	

=== West Coast-Tasman ===
2020 general election: West Coast-Tasman
Notes:	Blue background denotes an incumbent. Pink background denotes a current list MP. Yellow background denotes a retiring MP.			
Party	Candidate	Notes	List #	Source
Independent	Cory Aitken			
New Conservative	Karl Barkley			
Social Credit	Jack Collin		4	
Independent	Peter Ewen			
NZ First	Jackie Farrelly	Contested electorate in 2017	21	
Advance NZ	Anne Fitzsimon	Contested Nelson for Māori Party in 2005	62	
ACT	William Gardner		32	
Outdoors	Luke King		9	
Labour	Damien O'Connor		14	
Money Free Party	Richard Osmaston	Contested Nelson in 2017		
National	Maureen Pugh	Contested electorate in 2017	19	
Green	Steve Richards		39	

=== Whanganui ===
2020 general election: Whanganui
Notes:	Blue background denotes an incumbent. Pink background denotes a current list MP. Yellow background denotes a retiring MP.			
Party	Candidate	Notes	List #	Source
Green	Alan Clay		29	
National	Harete Hipango		21	
Independent	Hillary Kieft	Initially selected as Advance NZ candidate for Taranaki-King Country		
Labour	Steph Lewis	Contested electorate in 2017	55	
New Conservative	Jonathan Marshall		23	
Social Credit	Heather Smith	Contested electorate in 2014	17	
Advance NZ	Charlotte Weber		33	

=== Whangaparāoa ===
2020 general election: Whangaparāoa
Notes:	Blue background denotes an incumbent. Pink background denotes a current list MP. Yellow background denotes a retiring MP.			
Party	Candidate	Notes	List #	Source
Outdoors	Tricia Cheel	Contested Northcote for Democrats in 2017	10	
Sustainable NZ	John Davies		9	
Labour	Lorayne Ferguson			
Advance NZ	Kathryn Flay		40	
ACT	Paul Grace		34	
New Conservative	Fiona Mackenzie		5	
National	Mark Mitchell		15	

=== Whangārei ===
2020 general election: Whangārei
Notes:	Blue background denotes an incumbent. Pink background denotes a current list MP. Yellow background denotes a retiring MP.			
Party	Candidate	Notes	List #	Source
Green	Moea Armstrong	Contested electorate in 2005	25	
New Conservative	Kerry Campbell			
Legalise Cannabis	Jennifer de Jonge		10	
Labour	Emily Henderson		64	
Social Credit	Chris Leitch	Contested electorate in 2017	1	
National	Shane Reti		5	
ACT	David Seymour	Not the ACT leader	18	
Opportunities	Ciara Swords		18	
ONE	Daniel Watts		27	
Advance NZ	Chris Wetere		24	
NZ First	David Wilson	Contested Te Atatū in 2017	9	
Retiring incumbents and withdrawn candidates
New Conservative	Jim Taylor	Initially announced, but later withdrew		

=== Wigram ===
2020 general election: Wigram
Notes:	Blue background denotes an incumbent. Pink background denotes a current list MP. Yellow background denotes a retiring MP.			
Party	Candidate	Notes	List #	Source
Advance NZ	Doug Allington		11	
National	Hamish Campbell		47	
NZ Economic Euthenics Party	Tubby Hansen	Perennial candidate; contested electorate in 2017		
Social Credit	Deane Landreth		16	
ACT	Miles McConway		11	
ONE	Linda McLaughlin		24	
Independent	Geoff McTague	Contested electorate for ALCP in 2011		
New Conservative	Averil Nuttall			
Green	Richard Wesley	Contested electorate in 2017	44	
Labour	Megan Woods		5	

== Māori electorates ==
=== Hauraki-Waikato ===
2020 general election: Hauraki-Waikato
Notes:	Blue background denotes an incumbent. Pink background denotes a current list MP. Yellow background denotes a retiring MP.			
Party	Candidate	Notes	List #	Source
New Conservative	Richard Hill			
Advance NZ	Phillip Lambert		19	
Labour	Nanaia Mahuta		10	
Māori Party	Donna Pokere-Phillips	Contested Hamilton West for TOP in 2017	5	
Retiring incumbents and withdrawn candidates
ONE	Te Rongopai Heta	Contesting Hamilton West instead		

=== Ikaroa-Rāwhiti ===
2020 general election: Ikaroa-Rāwhiti
Notes:	Blue background denotes an incumbent. Pink background denotes a current list MP. Yellow background denotes a retiring MP.			
Party	Candidate	Notes	List #	Source
New Conservative	Melissa Hill			
Green	Elizabeth Kerekere	Contested electorate in 2017	9	
Advance NZ	Waitangi Kupenga		34	
Māori Party	Heather Te Au-Skipworth		3	
Outdoors	Kelly Thurston		20	
Labour	Meka Whaitiri		28	

=== Tāmaki Makaurau ===
2020 general election: Tāmaki Makaurau
Notes:	Blue background denotes an incumbent. Pink background denotes a current list MP. Yellow background denotes a retiring MP.			
Party	Candidate	Notes	List #	Source
New Conservative	Erina Anderson			
Green	Marama Davidson	Contested electorate in 2017	1	
Labour	Peeni Henare		18	
Māori Party	John Tamihere	Represented electorate as Labour MP, 2002–2005	7	

=== Te Tai Hauāuru ===
2020 general election: Te Tai Hauāuru
Notes:	Blue background denotes an incumbent. Pink background denotes a current list MP. Yellow background denotes a retiring MP.			
Party	Candidate	Notes	List #	Source
Advance NZ	Noeline Apiata		56	
ONE	Korrallie Bailey-Taurua		19	
Outdoors	Kiri McKee		16	
New Conservative	Josh Morgan			
Māori Party	Debbie Ngarewa-Packer		1	
Labour	Adrian Rurawhe		24	

=== Te Tai Tokerau ===
2020 general election: Te Tai Tokerau
Notes:	Blue background denotes an incumbent. Pink background denotes a current list MP. Yellow background denotes a retiring MP.			
Party	Candidate	Notes	List #	Source
ONE	Janice Arahanga-Epiha		12	
Labour	Kelvin Davis		2	
Independent	Clinton Dearlove			
Legalise Cannabis	Maki Herbert	Contested electorate in 2017	2	
Māori Party	Mariameno Kapa-Kingi		6	
Independent	Moemoea Mohoawhenua			
New Conservative	Daniel Shortland			
Public	Billy Te Kahika		1	
Retiring incumbents and withdrawn candidates
ONE	Stephanie Harawira	Contesting Mana instead		

=== Te Tai Tonga ===
2020 general election: Te Tai Tonga
Notes:	Blue background denotes an incumbent. Pink background denotes a current list MP. Yellow background denotes a retiring MP.			
Party	Candidate	Notes	List #	Source
Maori Party	Tākuta Ferris		4	
Legalise Cannabis	Anituhia McDonald		7	
Green	Ariana Paretutanganui-Tamati	Contested Rongotai for Mana Movement in 2014		
Advance NZ	Matiu Thoms		31	
Labour	Rino Tirikatene		29	
New Conservative	Raymond Tuhaka			

=== Waiariki ===
2020 general election: Waiariki
Notes:	Blue background denotes an incumbent. Pink background denotes a current list MP. Yellow background denotes a retiring MP.			
Party	Candidate	Notes	List #	Source
New Conservative	Riki Broughton			
Labour	Tāmati Coffey		37	
Vision NZ	Hannah Tamaki		1	
Outdoors	Rawiri Tekowhai		13	
Māori Party	Rawiri Waititi	Contested electorate for Labour in 2014	2	
Advance NZ	Ema Williams		6	

== See also ==
- Party lists in the 2020 New Zealand general election
