= Party lists in the 2020 New Zealand general election =

New Zealand political candidates in the MMP era
Year	Party list	Candidates
1996	party lists	by electorate
1999	party lists	by electorate
2002	party lists	by electorate
2005	party lists	by electorate
2008	party lists	by electorate
2011	party lists	by electorate
2014	party lists	by electorate
2017	party lists	by electorate
2020	party lists	by electorate
2023	party lists	by electorate
2026	party lists	by electorate

The 2020 New Zealand general election held on Saturday, 17 October 2020 determined the membership of the 53rd New Zealand Parliament. It was previously scheduled for 19 September, before being delayed due to the COVID-19 pandemic. Parliament has 120 seats, and 72 will be filled by electorate MPs, with the remaining 48 from ranked party lists. Parties were required to submit their party lists to the Electoral Commission by 17 September and the lists were publicly released on 19 September, though some parties published their lists earlier than that. This page lists candidates by party, including their ranking on a list.

== Successful parties ==
=== ACT Party ===
ACT New Zealand released the first 20 places on its list on 28 June 2020. On 6 July, Stephen Berry, contesting Pakuranga and ranked ninth on the list, withdrew his candidacy for health reasons. The remainder of the list, with candidates ranked in alphabetical order, was released by the Electoral Commission on 19 September 2020.

Rank	Name	Incumbency	Contesting electorate	Previous rank	Change	Initial results	Later changes
1	David Seymour	Electorate	Epsom	1	0	✓ Won Epsom	
2	Brooke van Velden		Wellington Central	3	+1	✓ Elected from list	
3	Nicole McKee		Rongotai	—	—	✓ Elected from list	
4	Chris Baillie		Nelson	—	—	✓ Elected from list	
5	Simon Court		Te Atatū	—	—	✓ Elected from list	
6	James McDowall		Waikato	13	+7	✓ Elected from list	
7	Karen Chhour		Upper Harbour	—	—	✓ Elected from list	
8	Mark Cameron		Northland	—	—	✓ Elected from list	
9	Toni Severin		Christchurch East	10	+1	✓ Elected from list	
10	Damien Smith		Botany	—	—	✓ Elected from list	
11	Miles McConway		Wigram	—	—		
12	Beth Houlbrooke		Kaipara ki Mahurangi	2	−10		
13	Carmel Claridge		Tamaki	—	—		
14	Bruce Carley		Bay of Plenty	18	+4		
15	Cameron Luxton		Tauranga	—	—		
16	Grae O'Sullivan		Remutaka	11	−5		
17	Myah Deedman		Hamilton East	—	—		
18	David Seymour		Whangārei	—	—		
19	David King		Port Waikato	—	—		
20	Andy Parkins		Hutt South	17	−3		
21	Robert Andrews		Taieri	—	—		
22	Stu Armstrong		Selwyn	—	—		
23	Sean Beamish		Waitaki	—	—		
24	Shawn Blanchfield		New Lynn	—	—		
25	Jan Daffern		Tukituki	—	—		
26	James Davies		Waimakariri	—	—		
27	Richard Evans		Kaikōura	12	−15		
28	Tommy Fergusson		Maungakiekie	—	—		
29	Sean Fitzpatrick		Ōhāriu	—	—		
30	David Fox		Banks Peninsula	—	—		
31	David Freeman		Taupō	—	—		
32	William Gardner		West Coast-Tasman	—	—		
33	Paul Gilbert		Ilam	24	−9		
34	Paul Grace		Whangaparāoa	—	—		
35	Wayne Grattan		Ōtaki	39	+4		
36	Roger Greenslade		Wairarapa	25	−11		
37	Hamish Hutton		Rangitata	—	—		
38	Abby Johnson		Christchurch Central	—	—		
39	Chris Johnston		Mount Roskill	—	—		
40	Nick Kearney			29	−11		
41	Judith Kendall		Napier	—	—		
42	Pete Kirkwood		Rotorua	—	—		
43	Tim Kronfeld		Northcote	30	−13		
44	Michael McCook		East Coast Bays	—	—		
45	Mike McCormick		Takanini	—	—		
46	Brent Miles		Taranaki-King Country	—	—		
47	David Olsen		Coromandel	—	—		
48	Matthew Percival		Kelston	—	—		
49	Jack Phillips		Palmerston North	—	—		
50	Felix Poole		Auckland Central	—	—		
51	Mo Yee Poon		Pakuranga	—	—		
52	Callum Steele-Macintosh		Dunedin	—	—		
53	Blake Webb		East Coast	—	—		
54	Roger Weldon		Hamilton West	—	—		
55	Bruce Whitehead		Papakura	—	—		
56	Neil Wilson		Rangitīkei	37	−19		
57	Ada Xiao		New Plymouth	—	—		

=== Green Party ===
The Green Party has a two-stage process to determine its party list, a process that they claim is "the most democratic list selection process in the country". The initial list is determined by attendees of the annual Green Party conference, which was held during February 2020. In a departure from previous practice, the initial list was not publicly released, but media company Stuff published a partial list on 9 April 2020.

Rank	Name	Incumbency	Contesting electorate	Previous rank	Change	Initial results	Later changes
1	Marama Davidson	List	Tāmaki Makaurau	2	+1		
2	James Shaw	List	Wellington Central	1	−1		
3	Jan Logie	List		6	+3		
4	Eugenie Sage	List		4	0		
5	Teanau Tuiono		Palmerston North	16	+11		
6	Julie Anne Genter	List		3	−3		
7	Chlöe Swarbrick	List	Auckland Central	7	0		
8	Golriz Ghahraman	List		8	0		
9	Elizabeth Kerekere			19	+10		
10	Ricardo Menéndez March		Maungakiekie	21	+11		
12	Lourdes Vano		Manurewa	—	—		
19	Luke Wijohn		Mount Albert	—	—		

The initial list was finalised through voting by all party members and was to be expected in early June. The first 24 positions of the final list were reported by The New Zealand Herald on 24 May.

Rank	Name	Incumbency	Contesting electorate	Previous rank	Change	Initial results	Later changes
1	Marama Davidson	List	Tāmaki Makaurau	2	+1	✓ Elected from list	
2	James Shaw	List	Wellington Central	1	−1	✓ Elected from list	
3	Chlöe Swarbrick	List	Auckland Central	7	+4	✓ Won Auckland Central	
4	Julie Anne Genter	List		3	−1	✓ Elected from list	
5	Jan Logie	List	Mana	6	+1	✓ Elected from list	
6	Eugenie Sage	List	Banks Peninsula	4	−2	✓ Elected from list	
7	Golriz Ghahraman	List	Mount Roskill	8	+1	✓ Elected from list	
8	Teanau Tuiono		Palmerston North	16	+8	✓ Elected from list	
9	Elizabeth Kerekere		Ikaroa Rawhiti	19	+10	✓ Elected from list	✗ Left party in 2023
10	Ricardo Menéndez March		Maungakiekie	21	+11	✓ Elected from list	
11	Steve Abel		New Lynn	—	—		
12	Teall Crossen		Rongotai	15	+3		
13	Scott Willis		Taieri	—	—		
14	Kyle MacDonald		Epsom	—	—		
15	Lourdes Vano		Manurewa	—	—		
16	John Ranta		Ōhāriu	—	—		
17	Lawrence Xu-Nan		Pakuranga	—	—		
18	Luke Wijohn		Mount Albert	—	—		
19	Kaya Sparke		Rotorua	—	—		
20	Jack Brazil		Dunedin	—	—		
21	James Crow		Napier	—	—		
22	Elliot Blyth			—	—		
23	Richard McIntosh		Hutt South	—	—		
24	Gerrie Ligtenberg		Rangitata	—	—		
25	Moea Armstrong		Whangārei	—	—		
26	Nikki Berry		Christchurch East	—	—		
27	Rimu Bhooi		Hamilton East	—	—		
28	Zephyr Brown		Kaipara ki Mahurangi	—	—		
29	Alan Clay		Whanganui	—	—		
30	Josh Cole		Tauranga	—	—		
31	Danna Glendining		Taupō	—	—		
32	Pamela Grealey		Coromandel	—	—		
33	Chrys Horn		Christchurch Central	46	+13		
34	Daniel Jones		East Coast Bays	—	—		
35	Richard McCubbin		Kaikōura	—	—		
36	Chris Norton		Remutaka	—	—		
37	Abe O'Donnell		Selwyn	—	—		
38	Elizabeth Rawlings		North Shore	—	—		
39	Steve Richards		West Coast-Tasman	—	—		
40	Mark Simiona		Panmure-Ōtāhuhu	—	—		
41	Aaron Stallard		Nelson	—	—		
42	Darleen Tana Hoff-Nielsen		Northland	—	—		
43	Ali Hale Tilley		Rangitīkei	—	—		
44	Richard Wesley		Wigram	40	−4		

=== Labour Party ===
The Labour Party released its list on 15 June 2020. On 4 July, Kurt Taogaga was removed from his position at 68th on the list after past tweets were resurfaced in which he praised an Islamophobic column written by NZ First MP Richard Prosser. On 21 July, incumbent list MP Raymond Huo, who had been placed at 26th on the list, announced that he would not contest the election. On 22 July, Iain Lees-Galloway, 13th on the list, announced he would retire after being removed from his ministerial roles for inappropriate workplace relations.

Rank	Name	Portrait	Incumbency	Contesting electorate	Previous rank	Change	Initial results	Later changes
1	Jacinda Ardern		Electorate	Mount Albert	1	0	✓ Won Mount Albert	✗ Left parliament in 2023
2	Kelvin Davis		Electorate	Te Tai Tokerau	2	0	✓ Won Te Tai Tokerau	
3	Grant Robertson		Electorate	Wellington Central	4	+1	✓ Won Wellington Central	
4	Phil Twyford		Electorate	Te Atatū	5	+1	✓ Won Te Atatū	
5	Megan Woods		Electorate	Wigram	6	+1	✓ Won Wigram	
6	Chris Hipkins		Electorate	Remutaka	7	+1	✓ Won Remutaka	
7	Andrew Little		List		3	−4	✓ Elected from list	
8	Carmel Sepuloni		Electorate	Kelston	8	0	✓ Won Kelston	
9	David Parker		List		10	+1	✓ Elected from list	
10	Nanaia Mahuta		Electorate	Hauraki-Waikato	—	—	✓ Won Hauraki-Waikato	
11	Trevor Mallard		List		33	+22	✓ Elected from list	✗ Left parliament in 2022
12	Stuart Nash		Electorate	Napier	11	−1	✓ Won Napier	
13	Jenny Salesa		Electorate	Panmure-Ōtāhuhu	19	+6	✓ Won Panmure-Ōtāhuhu	
14	Damien O'Connor		Electorate	West Coast-Tasman	18	+4	✓ Won West Coast-Tasman	
15	Kris Faafoi		Electorate		20	+5	✓ Elected from list	✗ Left parliament in 2022
16	David Clark		Electorate	Dunedin	9	−7	✓ Won Dunedin	
17	Ayesha Verrall				—	—	✓ Elected from list	
18	Peeni Henare		Electorate	Tāmaki Makaurau	—	—	✓ Won Tāmaki Makaurau	
19	Willie Jackson		List		22	+3	✓ Elected from list	
20	William Sio		Electorate	Māngere	16	−4	✓ Won Māngere	
21	Poto Williams		Electorate	Christchurch East	25	+4	✓ Won Christchurch East	
22	Vanushi Walters			Upper Harbour	—	—	✓ Won Upper Harbour	
23	Michael Wood		Electorate	Mount Roskill	27	+4	✓ Won Mount Roskill	
24	Adrian Rurawhe		Electorate	Te Tai Hauāuru	—	—	✓ Won Te Tai Hauāuru	
25	Kiri Allan		List	East Coast	21	−4	✓ Won East Coast	
26	Kieran McAnulty		List	Wairarapa	38	+12	✓ Won Wairarapa	
27	Louisa Wall		Electorate		26	−1	✓ Elected from list	✗ Left parliament in 2022
28	Meka Whaitiri		Electorate	Ikaroa-Rāwhiti	—	—	✓ Won Ikaroa-Rāwhiti	✗ Left party in 2023
29	Rino Tirikatene		Electorate	Te Tai Tonga	—	—	✓ Won Te Tai Tonga	
30	Camilla Belich			Epsom	—	—	✓ Elected from list	
31	Priyanca Radhakrishnan		List	Maungakiekie	12	−19	✓ Won Maungakiekie	
32	Jan Tinetti		List	Tauranga	15	−17	✓ Elected from list	
33	Deborah Russell		Electorate	New Lynn	30	−3	✓ Won New Lynn	
34	Marja Lubeck		List	Kaipara ki Mahurangi	32	−2	✓ Elected from list	
35	Angie Warren-Clark		List	Bay of Plenty	39	+4	✓ Elected from list	
36	Willow-Jean Prime		List	Northland	17	−19	✓ Won Northland	
37	Tāmati Coffey		Electorate	Waiariki	35	−2	✓ Elected from list	
38	Naisi Chen			Botany	50	+12	✓ Elected from list	
39	Jo Luxton		List	Rangitata	29	−10	✓ Won Rangitata	
40	Jamie Strange		List	Hamilton East	36	−4	✓ Won Hamilton East	
41	Liz Craig		List	Invercargill	31	−10	✓ Elected from list	
42	Ibrahim Omer				—	—	✓ Elected from list	
43	Duncan Webb		Electorate	Christchurch Central	43	0	✓ Won Christchurch Central	
44	Anahila Kanongata'a-Suisuiki		List	Papakura	37	−7	✓ Elected from list	
45	Ginny Andersen		List	Hutt South	28	−17	✓ Won Hutt South	
46	Rachel Brooking				—	—	✓ Elected from list	
47	Paul Eagle		Electorate	Rongotai	34	−13	✓ Won Rongotai	
48	Helen White			Auckland Central	40	−8	✓ Elected from list	
49	Barbara Edmonds			Mana	—	—	✓ Won Mana	
50	Angela Roberts			Taranaki-King Country	—	—	✓ Elected from list	
51	Shanan Halbert			Northcote	51	0	✓ Won Northcote	
52	Neru Leavasa			Takanini	—	—	✓ Won Takanini	
53	Tracey McLellan			Banks Peninsula	—	—	✓ Won Banks Peninsula	
54	Lemauga Lydia Sosene				44	−10		✓ Replaced Louisa Wall in 2022
55	Steph Lewis			Whanganui	42	−13	✓ Won Whanganui	
56	Dan Rosewarne			Waimakariri	52	−4		✓ Replaced Kris Faafoi in 2022
57	Rachel Boyack			Nelson	48	−9	✓ Won Nelson	
58	Arena Williams			Manurewa	—	—	✓ Won Manurewa	
59	Ingrid Leary			Taieri	—	—	✓ Won Taieri	
60	Soraya Peke-Mason			Rangitīkei	—	—		✓ Replaced Trevor Mallard in 2022
61	Lotu Fuli				—	—		
62	Sarah Pallett			Ilam	—	—	✓ Won Ilam	
63	Gaurav Sharma			Hamilton West	70	+7	✓ Won Hamilton West	✗ Left parliament in 2022
64	Emily Henderson			Whangārei	—	—	✓ Won Whangārei	
65	Terisa Ngobi			Ōtaki	—	—	✓ Won Ōtaki	
66	Kerrin Leoni			Waikato	—	—		
67	Reuben Davidson			Selwyn	—	—		
68	Zahra Hussaini				—	—		
69	Janet Holborow				—	—		
70	Romy Udanga			North Shore	47	−23		
71	Ala' Al-Bustanji			Taupō	63	−8		
72	Glen Bennett			New Plymouth	—	—	✓ Won New Plymouth	
73	Monina Hernandez			East Coast Bays	—	—		
74	Claire Mahon			Rotorua	—	—		
75	Jon Mitchell			Southland	—	—		
76	Nathaniel Blomfield			Coromandel	69	−7		
77	Nerissa Henry			Pakuranga	—	—		
78	Matt Flight			Kaikōura	—	—		
79	Shirin Brown			Tāmaki	—	—		
80	Liam Wairepo			Waitaki	—	—		
81	Georgie Dansey				—	—		
—	Greg O'Connor		Electorate	Ōhāriu	—	—	✓ Won Ōhāriu	
—	Tangi Utikere			Palmerston North	—	—	✓ Won Palmerston North	
—	Anna Lorck			Tukituki	—	—	✓ Won Tukituki	

=== National Party ===
The National Party released its list on 8 August 2020.

Rank	Name	Incumbency	Contesting electorate	Previous rank	Change	Initial results	Later changes
1	Judith Collins	Electorate	Papakura	16	+15	✓ Won Papakura	
2	Gerry Brownlee	Electorate	Ilam	5	+3	✓ Elected from list	
3	Paul Goldsmith	List	Epsom	18	+15	✓ Elected from list	
4	Simon Bridges	Electorate	Tauranga	6	+2	✓ Won Tauranga	✗ Left parliament in 2022
5	Shane Reti	Electorate	Whangārei	45	+40	✓ Elected from list	
6	Todd McClay	Electorate	Rotorua	14	+8	✓ Won Rotorua	
7	Chris Bishop	Electorate	Hutt South	40	+33	✓ Elected from list	
8	Todd Muller	Electorate	Bay of Plenty	43	+35	✓ Won Bay of Plenty	
9	Louise Upston	Electorate	Taupō	19	+10	✓ Won Taupō	
10	Scott Simpson	Electorate	Coromandel	26	+16	✓ Won Coromandel	
11	David Bennett	Electorate	Hamilton East	24	+13	✓ Elected from list	
12	Michael Woodhouse	List	Dunedin	10	−2	✓ Elected from list	
13	Nicola Willis	List	Wellington Central	48	+35	✓ Elected from list	
14	Jacqui Dean	Electorate	Waitaki	23	+9	✓ Won Waitaki	
15	Mark Mitchell	Electorate	Whangaparāoa	21	+6	✓ Won Whangaparāoa	
16	Melissa Lee	List	Mount Albert	31	+15	✓ Elected from list	
17	Andrew Bayly	Electorate	Port Waikato	39	+22	✓ Won Port Waikato	
18	Nick Smith	Electorate	Nelson	15	−3	✓ Elected from list	✗ Left parliament in 2021
19	Maureen Pugh	List	West Coast-Tasman	44	+25	✓ Elected from list	
20	Barbara Kuriger	Electorate	Taranaki-King Country	28	+8	✓ Won Taranaki-King Country	
21	Harete Hipango	Electorate	Whanganui	62	+41	✗ Lost seat	✓ Replaced Nick Smith in 2021
22	Jonathan Young	Electorate	New Plymouth	35	+13	✗ Lost seat	
23	Tim Macindoe	Electorate	Hamilton West	25	+2	✗ Lost seat	
24	Kanwaljit Singh Bakshi	List	Panmure-Ōtāhuhu	32	+8	✗ Lost seat	
25	Paulo Garcia	List		50	+25	✗ Lost seat	
26	Nancy Lu			—	—		
27	Parmjeet Parmar	List	Mount Roskill	34	+7	✗ Lost seat	
28	Agnes Loheni	List	Māngere	49	+21	✗ Lost seat	
29	Dale Stephens		Christchurch Central	—	—		
30	Alfred Ngaro	List	Te Atatū	20	−10	✗ Lost seat	
31	Matt Doocey	Electorate	Waimakariri	29	−2	✓ Won Waimakariri	
32	Stuart Smith	Electorate	Kaikōura	47	+15	✓ Won Kaikōura	
33	Lawrence Yule	Electorate	Tukituki	67	+34	✗ Lost seat	
34	Denise Lee	Electorate	Maungakiekie	63	+29	✗ Lost seat	
35	Simon O'Connor	Electorate	Tāmaki	38	+3	✓ Won Tāmaki	
36	Brett Hudson	List	Ōhāriu	30	−6	✗ Lost seat	
37	Simeon Brown	Electorate	Pakuranga	60	+23	✓ Won Pakuranga	
38	Ian McKelvie	Electorate	Rangitīkei	37	−1	✓ Won Rangitīkei	
39	Erica Stanford	Electorate	East Coast Bays	65	+26	✓ Won East Coast Bays	
40	Matt King	Electorate	Northland	51	+11	✗ Lost seat	
41	Chris Penk	Electorate	Kaipara ki Mahurangi	64	+23	✓ Won Kaipara ki Mahurangi	
42	Tim van de Molen	Electorate	Waikato	66	+24	✓ Won Waikato	
43	Dan Bidois	Electorate	Northcote	72	+29	✗ Lost seat	
44	Jo Hayes	List	Mana	36	−8	✗ Lost seat	
45	Katie Nimon		Napier	—	—		
46	Catherine Chu		Banks Peninsula	—	—		
47	Hamish Campbell		Wigram	—	—		
48	David Patterson		Rongotai	—	—		
49	Lisa Whyte		New Lynn	70	+21		
50	Rima Nakhle		Takanini	—	—		
51	Liam Kernaghan		Taieri	—	—		
52	Bala Beeram		Kelston	57	+5		
53	Lincoln Platt		Christchurch East	—	—		
54	William Wood		Palmerston North	—	—		
55	Nuwi Samarakone		Manurewa	—	—		
56	Mark Crofskey		Remutaka	—	—		
57	Jake Bezzant		Upper Harbour	—	—		
58	Mike Butterick		Wairarapa	—	—		
59	Tim Costley		Otaki	—	—		
60	Nicola Grigg		Selwyn	—	—	✓ Won Selwyn	
61	Christopher Luxon		Botany	—	—	✓ Won Botany	
62	Joseph Mooney		Southland	—	—	✓ Won Southland	
63	Penny Simmonds		Invercargill	—	—	✓ Won Invercargill	
64	Tania Tapsell		East Coast	—	—		
65	Simon Watts		North Shore	—	—	✓ Won North Shore	
66	Emma Mellow		Auckland Central	—	—		
67	Megan Hands		Rangitata	—	—		
68	Adrienne Pierce			54	−14		
69	Senthuran Arulanantham			—	—		
70	Sang Cho			—	—		
71	Rachel Afeaki-Taumoepeau			—	—		
72	Trish Collett			—	—		
73	Ava Neal			—	—		
74	Ryl Jensen			—	—		
75	Shelley Pilkington			—	—		

=== Māori Party ===
The Māori Party released its list on 28 August 2020.

Rank	Name	Incumbency	Contesting electorate	Previous rank	Change	Initial results	Later changes
1	Debbie Ngarewa-Packer		Te Tai Hauāuru	—	—	✓ Elected from list	
2	Rawiri Waititi		Waiariki	—	—	✓ Won Waiariki	
3	Heather Te Au-Skipworth		Ikaroa-Rāwhiti	—	—		
4	Tākuta Ferris		Te Tai Tonga	—	—		
5	Donna Pokere-Phillips		Hauraki-Waikato	(TOP: 6)	+1		
6	Mariameno Kapa-Kingi		Te Tai Tokerau	—	—		
7	John Tamihere	(Former MP)	Tāmaki Makaurau	—	—		
8	Hana Tapiata			—	—		
9	Merepeka Raukawa-Tait			—	—		
10	Eru Kapa-Kingi			—	—		
11	Tureiti Moxon			—	—		
12	Elijah Pue			—	—		
13	Naida Glavish			—	—		
14	Tumanako Silveira			—	—		
15	Taiaha Hawke			—	—		
16	Kate Cherrington			—	—		
17	Tina Porou			16	−1		
18	Wendy Biddle			21	+3		
19	Te Ropu Poa			—	—		
20	Fallyn Flavell			—	—		
21	Rangi McLean			—	—		

== Unsuccessful parties ==
=== Advance NZ ===
Advance NZ shares a joint party list between its four component parties, the New Zealand Public Party, the New Zealand People's Party, Direct Democracy New Zealand and Reset NZ. The full list was published on 18 September 2020.

Rank	Name	Component Party	Incumbency	Contesting electorate	Previous rank	Change	Initial results	Later changes
1	Billy Te Kahika	Public		Te Tai Tokerau	—	—		
2	Jami-Lee Ross (Note: Ross defected from the National Party in 2018 and held his seat as an independent for the remainder of the 52nd Parliament, but stood as a list candidate for Advance NZ in 2020.)	Advance	Electorate		(National: 27)	+25	✗ Lost seat	
3	Claire Deeks	Advance			—	—		
4	Micheal Stace	Advance		Remutaka	—	—		
5	Tiamara Williams	Advance		Banks Peninsula	—	—		
6	Ema Williams	Advance		Waiariki	—	—		
7	Anil Sharma	Advance		Mount Roskill	(People's: 3)	−4		
8	Winston Jacob	Advance			—	—		
9	Ben Harris	Advance		Nelson	—	—		
10	Sharon Lyon	Advance		Palmerston North	—	—		
11	Douglas Allington	Advance		Wigram	—	—		
12	Flow In	Advance			—	—		
13	Kiri Ward	Advance		Rotorua	—	—		
14	Nathan Mitchell	Advance		Northland	—	—		
15	Tony Brljevich	Advance		Coromandel	—	—		
16	Jennie Brown	Advance		East Coast	—	—		
17	Glen McConnell	Advance		Christchurch East	—	—		
18	Toni Pengelly	Advance		Ilam	—	—		
19	Philip Lambert	Advance		Hauraki-Waikato	—	—		
20	Chris Newman	Advance			—	—		
21	Heather Meri Pennycook	Advance		Waitaki	—	—		
22	Craig Taylor	Advance			—	—		
23	Mischaela Daken	Advance		Hutt South	—	—		
24	Chris Wetere	Advance		Whangarei	—	—		
25	Cherie Ormsby-Kingi	Advance		Hamilton West	—	—		
26	Ricky Cribb	Advance		Rangitikei	—	—		
27	Siggi Henry	Advance		Hamilton East	—	—		
28	Nigel Gray	Advance		Wairarapa	—	—		
29	Vikki-Lee Pomare	Advance		Papakura	—	—		
30	Jerry Larason	Advance		Selwyn	—	—		
31	Matiu Thoms	Advance		Te Tai Tonga	—	—		
32	Jolene Smith	Advance		Ōhāriu	—	—		
33	Charlotte Weber	Advance		Whanganui	—	—		
34	Waitangi Kupenga	Advance		Ikaroa-Rawhiti	—	—		
35	Peter Vaughan	Advance		Upper Harbour	—	—		
36	Jamie Macgregor	Advance		Port Waikato	—	—		
37	Carl Peterson	Advance		Tukituki	—	—		
38	Bryn Jones	Advance		Panmure-Otahuhu	—	—		
39	Daymond Goulder-Horobin	Advance			(Internet: 3)	−36		
40	Kathryn Flay	Advance		Whangaparoa	—	—		
41	Megan Osborn	Advance		North Shore	—	—		
42	Rowena Wood	Advance		New Plymouth	—	—		
43	Maureen Kumeroa	Advance		Kelston	—	—		
44	Mitesh Kagathra	Advance		Takanini	—	—		
45	Robert Wilson	Advance		Southland	—	—		
46	Antoinette James	Advance		Taupo	—	—		
47	Shelley Richardson	Advance		Waimakariri	—	—		
48	Rose Greally	Advance		Wellington Central	—	—		
49	Steve Oliver	Advance		New Lynn	—	—		
50	Carole Church	Advance		Christchurch Central	—	—		
51	Aroha Maru	Advance		Rangitata	—	—		
52	Angela Moncur	Advance		Bay of Plenty	—	—		
53	Linda Jackson	Advance		Manurewa	—	—		
54	Kurt Rohloff	Advance		Invercargill	—	—		
55	Faith-Joy Aaron	Advance		Epsom	—	—		
56	Noeline Apiata	Advance		Te Tai Hauauru	—	—		
57	Lisa Romana	Advance		Kaikōura	—	—		
58	Sarai TePou	Advance		Tamaki	—	—		
59	Daniel Crosa	Advance		Tauranga	—	—		
60	Fred Roberts	Advance		Taieri	—	—		
61	Edward Ponder	Advance		Mana	—	—		
62	Anne Fitzsimon	Advance		West-Coast Tasman	—	—		

=== Heartland NZ ===
Rank	Name	Incumbency	Contesting electorate	Previous rank	Change	Initial results	Later changes
1	Mark Ball		Port Waikato	—	—		
2	Andrew Loader			—	—		
3	Gillian Paton			—	—		
4	Keith Holmes			—	—		
5	Peter Buckley			—	—		

=== Legalise Cannabis Party ===
Rank	Name	Incumbency	Contesting electorate	Previous rank	Change	Initial results	Later changes
1	Michael Appleby		Wellington Central	—	—		
2	Maki Herbert		Te Tai Tokerau	1	−1		
3	Mike Britnell		Christchurch Central	4	+1		
4	Paula Lambert		Christchurch East	3	−1		
5	Irinka Britnell			—	—		
6	Kevin O'Connell			—	—		
7	Anituhia McDonald		Te Tai Tonga	—	—		
8	Romana Manning		Tukituki	—	—		
9	Jeff Lye		Kelston	2	−7		
10	Jennifer de Jonge		Whangārei	—	—		
11	Christopher Coker		Bay of Plenty	—	—		
12	Antony Brown			12	0		

=== New Conservative Party ===
The New Conservative Party released their full list on 18 September 2020.

Rank	Name	Incumbency	Contesting electorate	Previous rank	Change	Initial results	Later changes
1	Leighton Baker		Waimakariri	1	0		
2	Elliot Ikilei		Takanini	2	0		
3	Victoria O'Brien		New Lynn	—	—		
4	Lachie Ashton		Rangitata	6	+2		
5	Fiona Mackenzie		Whangaparāoa	—	—		
6	Helen Houghton		Christchurch East	—	—		
7	Bernadette Soares		Upper Harbour	—	—		
8	Alan Tāne Solomon		Rotorua	—	—		
9	Dieuwe de Boer		Botany	—	—		
10	Roger Earp		Hutt South	—	—		
11	Deborah Burnside		Napier	—	—		
12	Mike Brewer		North Shore	—	—		
13	Murray Chong		New Plymouth	(NZ First: 30)	+17		
14	Helena Nickerson		East Coast	—	—		
15	Paul Hignett		Tauranga	—	—		
16	Lee Smith		Taranaki-King Country	—	—		
17	Bruce Welsh		Rongotai	8	−9		
18	Fuiavailili Ala'ilima		Māngere	—	—		
19	Bronnie Lyell		Selwyn	—	—		
20	Martin Frauenstein		Ōtaki	5	−15		
21	Benjamin Price		Christchurch Central	12	−9		
22	Margaret Colmore		Bay of Plenty	—	—		
23	Jonathan Marshall		Whanganui	—	—		
24	Warren Butterworth		Wairarapa	—	—		

=== New Zealand First ===
New Zealand First released its list on 17 September 2020.

Rank	Name	Incumbency	Contesting electorate	Previous rank	Change	Initial results	Later changes
1	Winston Peters	List		1	0	✗ Lost seat	
2	Fletcher Tabuteau	List	Rotorua	4	+2	✗ Lost seat	
3	Tracey Martin	List	Ōhāriu	3	0	✗ Lost seat	
4	Shane Jones	List	Northland	8	+4	✗ Lost seat	
5	Ron Mark	List	Wairarapa	2	−3	✗ Lost seat	
6	Darroch Ball	List	Palmerston North	5	−1	✗ Lost seat	
7	Mark Patterson	List	Taieri	7	0	✗ Lost seat	
8	Talani Meikle		Remutaka	25	+17		
9	David Wilson		Whangārei	14	+5		
10	Denis O'Rourke	(Former MP)	Banks Peninsula	13	+3		
11	Erika Harvey		Tauranga	—	—		
12	Mahesh Bindra	(Former MP)	Hutt South	10	−2		
13	Jamie Arbuckle		Kaikōura	23	+10		
14	Mark Arneil		Christchurch Central	—	—		
15	Joshua Gunn		Invercargill	—	—		
16	Stu Husband		Hamilton East	17	+1		
17	Jenny Marcroft	List	Auckland Central	9	−8	✗ Lost seat	
18	Tricia Lawrence		Bay of Plenty	—	—		
19	Robert Gore		New Lynn	—	—		
20	Robert Griffith		Dunedin	—	—		
21	Jackie Farrelly		West Coast-Tasman	31	+10		
22	Anthony Odering		Waitaki	—	—		
23	Taylor Arneil		Rongotai	—	—		
24	Anne Degia-Pala		Kelston	28	+4		
25	John Hall		Manurewa	45	+20		
26	Brenda Steele		Kaipara ki Mahurangi	—	—		
27	Robert Monds		Papakura	—	—		
28	Antony Woollams		Rangitīkei	—	—		

=== ONE Party ===
Rank	Name	Incumbency	Contesting electorate	Previous rank	Change	Initial results	Later changes
1	Stephanie Harawira		Mana	—	—		
2	Edward Shanly		Hutt South	—	—		
3	Deon Claassens		Nelson	—	—		
4	Ian Johnson		Port Waikato	—	—		
5	Karri-Ann Vercoe		Rotorua	—	—		
6	Allan Cawood		Ōhāriu	—	—		
7	John Donald Moore		Kaikōura	—	—		
8	Frank Eijgenraam		Remutaka	—	—		
9	Stan Smith		Taieri	—	—		
10	Gina Sunderland		Wellington Central	—	—		
11	Leighton Packer			—	—		
12	Janice Arahanga-Epiha		Te Tai Tokerau	—	—		
13	Faye Lavaka Tangipa		Kelston	—	—		
14	Jackie West		Invercargill	—	—		
15	Judith Terrill		Southland	—	—		
16	Ernest Murray Packer			—	—		
17	Veronica King		East Coast	—	—		
18	Gary Michael Coffin		Taupō	—	—		
19	Korrallie Bailey-Taurua		Te Tai Hauāuru	—	—		
20	Rattan Singh		Manurewa	—	—		
21	Dollarina O'Sullivan			—	—		
22	Sharon Devery		Bay of Plenty	—	—		
23	Paula Maree Eason		Christchurch East	—	—		
24	Linda McLaughlin		Wigram	—	—		
25	Melanie Lorraine Petrowski		Tukituki	—	—		
26	Yifat Goddard			—	—		
27	Daniel Watts		Whangārei	—	—		
28	Charlene Roxanne Pehi		Mount Roskill	—	—		
29	Khurram Shahid Malik		New Lynn	—	—		
30	Jan Roberts			—	—		
31	Carolyn Shanly			—	—		
32	Dawn Rupapera			—	—		
33	Pisa Seala		Ōtaki	—	—		
34	Te Rongopai Heta		Hamilton West	—	—		
35	Richard John Reeves		Kaipara ki Mahurangi	—	—		
36	Dawn Rice			—	—		
37	Richard Noall			—	—		
38	Anna Noall			—	—		
39	Alexander Charles McLaughlin			—	—		

=== The Opportunities Party ===
Rank	Name	Incumbency	Contesting electorate	Previous rank	Change	Initial results	Later changes
1	Geoff Simmons		Rongotai	2	+1		
2	Shai Navot		North Shore	—	—		
3	Jessica Hammond		Ōhāriu	24	+21		
4	Mathew Pottinger		Nelson	—	—		
5	Benjamin Peters		Dunedin	—	—		
6	Tuariki Delamere	(Former MP)	Auckland Central	—	—		
7	Ben Atkinson		Banks Peninsula	—	—		
8	Naomi Pocock		Hamilton East	—	—		
9	Adriana Christie		Epsom	—	—		
10	Brendon Monk		Te Atatū	—	—		
11	Abe Gray		Wellington Central	14	+3		
12	Cameron Lord		Mount Albert	—	—		
13	Rob Hunter		Coromandel	—	—		
14	Ben Wylie-van Eerd		Hutt South	—	—		
15	Chris Jenkins		Bay of Plenty	—	—		
16	Andrew Caie		Tauranga	—	—		
17	Joel Rowlands		Southland	—	—		
18	Ciara Swords		Whangārei	—	—		
19	Dan Thurston Crow		New Plymouth	16	−3		
20	Hayden Cargo		Hamilton West	—	—		
21	Helen Jeremiah		Northland	—	—		

=== Outdoors Party ===
Rank	Name	Incumbency	Contesting electorate	Previous rank	Change	Initial results	Later changes
1	Sue Grey		Nelson	—	—		
2	Alan Simmons			1	−1		
3	Tracy Livingston		Tauranga	(Democrats: 19)	+16		
4	Darlene Morgan		Kaikōura	—	—		
5	Wilf Bearman-Riedel		Hutt South	4	−1		
6	Heidi Jensen-Warren		Ilam	—	—		
7	Catherine Giorza		Upper Harbour	—	—		
8	Michael Downard		Taupō	—	—		
9	Luke King		West Coast-Tasman	—	—		
10	Tricia Cheel		Whangaparāoa	(Democrats: 22)	+12		
11	Marius Koekemoer		East Coast Bays	—	—		
12	Grant William Kelynack		Rangitata	—	—		
13	Rawiri te Kowhai		Waiariki	—	—		
14	Lucille Rutherfurd		Port Waikato	—	—		
15	Phillip Bridge		Panmure-Ōtāhuhu	—	—		
16	Kiri McKee		Te Tai Hauāuru	—	—		
17	Michele Mitcalfe		Northland	—	—		
18	Charlotte Staples		Christchurch East	—	—		
19	Steven Hart		Coromandel	—	—		
20	Kelly Thurston		Ikaroa-Rāwhiti	—	—		
21	Chloe Mansfield		Hamilton West	—	—		
22	Jim Hilton			—	—		
23	Sue Dick		North Shore	—	—		
24	Christopher Grey		Taranaki-King Country	—	—		
25	Teena Smith		Papakura	—	—		
26	Robert Bruce		Wellington Central	—	—		
27	Lynn Usmani		Northcote	—	—		
28	Maia Prochazka		Epsom	—	—		

=== Social Credit Party ===
The Social Credit Party had 23 list candidates.

Rank	Name	Incumbency	Contesting electorate	Previous rank	Change	Initial results	Later changes
1	Chris Leitch		Whangārei	2	+1		
2	Amanda Vickers		Ōtaki	—	—		
3	Cliff Hall		Mount Roskill	—	—		
4	Jack Collin		West Coast-Tasman	11	+7		
5	Kath Lauderdale		New Plymouth	—	—		
6	Jason Jobsis		Kelston	3	−3		
7	Warren Voight		Taieri	(NZ First: 46)	+39		
8	Winsome Aroha		Invercargill	—	—		
9	Brannon Favel		Rangitata	—	—		
10	Lawrence McIsaac		Waimakariri	—	—		
11	Callan Neylon		Kaipara ki Mahurangi	—	—		
12	Elisabeth Dacker		Southland	—	—		
13	Lisa Er		New Lynn	—	—		
14	Andrew Leitch			6	−8		
15	Zariah Anjaiya-Winder		Dunedin	—	—		
16	Deane Landreth		Wigram	—	—		
17	Heather Marion Smith		Whanganui	18	+1		
18	Brad Flutey		Northland	—	—		
19	Mischele Rhodes		Hamilton East	9	−10		
20	Grant Crowther		Māngere	—	—		
21	Barry Pulford			21	0		
22	John McCaskey		Kaikōura	23	+1		
23	Bill Rossiter			—	—		

=== Sustainable New Zealand Party ===
Rank	Name	Incumbency	Contesting electorate	Previous rank	Change	Initial results	Later changes
1	Vernon Tava		Auckland Central	—	—		
2	Mari Huusko		North Shore	—	—		
3	John Hyndman		Waimakariri	—	—		
4	Rachel Wood		Pakuranga	—	—		
5	Shannon Withers		Epsom	—	—		
6	Peter Fleming		Botany	—	—		
7	Brian Mowat-Gainsford		Waitaki	—	—		
8	Dean Riddell			—	—		
9	John Davies		Whangaparāoa	—	—		
10	Dion Thomas		Upper Harbour	—	—		
11	Bevan Read		Northcote	—	—		

=== TEA Party ===
Rank	Name	Incumbency	Contesting electorate	Previous rank	Change	Initial results	Later changes
1	John Hong		Takanini	—	—		
2	Susanna Kruger		East Coast Bays	—	—		
3	Winson Tan		Upper Harbour	—	—		
4	John Palino			—	—		
5	Noel Jiang		Epsom	—	—		
6	Dominic Hoffman Dervan		Auckland Central	—	—		
7	Gavin Liu			—	—		
8	Vishal Choksi		Mt Roskill	—	—		
9	Wella Bernardo		Manurewa	—	—		
10	Frank Amoah		Te Atatu	—	—		
11	Smitaben Patel		New Lynn	—	—		
12	Rogelio Guedea			—	—		

=== Vision NZ ===
Rank	Name	Incumbency	Contesting electorate	Previous rank	Change	Initial results	Later changes
1	Hannah Tamaki		Waiariki	—	—		
2	Destry Murphy		Hamilton East	—	—		
3	Sonny Wilcox		Manurewa	—	—		
4	George Ngatai		Takanini	(Māori: 17)	+13		
5	Paris Winiata		Hutt South	—	—		

== See also ==
- Candidates in the 2020 New Zealand general election by electorate
