= Heartland New Zealand Party =

New Zealand political party

Heartland New Zealand
- Leader: Mark Ball
- Founded: c. 2019
- Dissolved: c. 2023
- Headquarters: Pukekohe
- Political position: Centre-right
- House of Representatives: 0 / 120

Heartland New Zealand was a New Zealand political party. The party was rural-based, and opposed the New Zealand Emissions Trading Scheme, the Paris Agreement, and attempts to limit the environmental impacts of agriculture.

== History ==
=== Founding and 2020 election ===
Policy.nz states that the party was founded in 2020, prior to the 2020 election. For that election, the party was led by former Franklin District mayor Mark Ball. However, in 2023, the party stated, via Scoop, that it was founded in 2019.

At the time of its founding, it was backed by Hamilton entrepreneur Harry Mowbray, father of Nick Mowbray, a billionaire who, with his siblings, was on the 2019 NBR Rich List.

Heartland did not apply for a broadcasting allocation, which was allocated in May 2020. The party applied for registration with the Electoral Commission in July, and was registered on 6 August 2020. It had a party list of five people for the 2020 election — tied for the shortest party list with Vision NZ — and Mark Ball was its only electorate candidate, standing in the Port Waikato electorate.

The party won 914 party votes (0.003% of the total) in the 2020 election, the fewest party votes of the registered parties. Ball came third in Port Waikato, with 8,462 electorate votes (21%).

=== 2023 election and beyond ===
In June 2023 the party's registration was cancelled at its own request. It initially said that it intended to run for electorate seats in the 2023 election, in the hopes of creating an overhang. However, it did not field any candidates. The party announced that it had decided not to contest the 2023 election at all, saying it intended to build towards the 2026 election. Heartland NZ did not stand any candidates in the 2026 election.

== Ideology ==
Heartland NZ sought to form a coalition with other right-wing parties. The party was critical of climate change policies and water restrictions and opposed New Zealand's ban on oil and gas exploration. In 2023, it campaigned against the Labour government's Clean Car Standard, and against "wokeism" and political correctness.

== Election results ==
=== House of Representatives ===
| Election | Candidates nominated | | Seats won | Votes | Vote share % | Position | MPs in parliament |
| Election | Electorate | List | Seats won | Votes | Vote share % | Position | MPs in parliament |
|---|---|---|---|---|---|---|---|
| 2020 | 1 | 5 | 0 | 987 | 0.1 | 17th | 0 / 120 |
