= Policy.nz =

New Zealand election information website

Policy.nz is an interactive, online voting advice application run during election campaigns. It simplifies and categorises the election policies of political parties and candidates and allows users to compare policies within topics. Using interactive features, users can save policies or view policies with party or candidate names hidden.

Policy.nz and PolicyLocal.nz have been used by hundreds of thousands of voters around the world.

== Background ==
Policy.nz was developed by Ollie Neas, Asher Emanuel, Chris McIntyre, and Racheal Reeves. According to Neas, it was created because “there was no single place to view all the parties’ policies” and “there has been a dearth of coverage that provides policy information in a clean way”. Since 2019, Policy.nz has received funding from Google News Initiative.

== Methodology ==
Policy.nz captures party policies from parties’ official websites, policy documents, press releases and social media posts, or by surveying candidates directly.

For party policies, an editorial process is applied to create simplified policy statements and descriptions that use consistent language. This allows users to compare policies from different parties and candidates by topic (such as Housing) and sub-topic (such as Housing Affordability). Citations to parties’ original source material are provided for all policy statements.

Policy.nz contrasts to other voting advice applications by not using a quiz-based format or algorithms to recommend who a user should vote for.

== Uses ==
=== New Zealand general elections ===
Policy.nz was published at the 2017 general election, 2020 general election, and the 2023 general election in partnership with The Spinoff. Around one in six New Zealand voters – 500,000 users – used the 2020 general election tool, which covered 2,000 policies and 500 candidates.

Since its launch in 2017 the Policy.nz website has received acclaim from media commentators and was called “the stand-out success of the 2017 election” in The New Zealand Herald’s round-up of voting advice tools.

In 2020, Policy.nz ran a civics education programme and a policy idea competition for school students alongside its election coverage. The policy idea competition was judged by basketballer Steven Adams, journalist Mihingarangi Forbes, science educator Michelle Dickinson, academic Marilyn Waring and entrepreneur Tim Brown.

=== New Zealand local elections ===
PolicyLocal.nz was published at the 2019 local elections and 2022 local elections in partnership with The Spinoff and the Local Government New Zealand Vote2019 campaign. The website profiled 3,500 candidates across 574 elections. Around one in 20 voters used PolicyLocal.nz.

=== International uses ===
Versions of Policy.nz have been launched to cover the Belgian general election, in partnership with Le Vif and Knack in Belgium, and global Covid-19 policies.

Covid-19 Policy Watch captured the Covid-19 policies of 31 countries, in partnership with Newslaundry (India), Knack (Belgium), Taiwan News, Vietnam National University, and The Spinoff (New Zealand).
