= Integrity Party of Aotearoa New Zealand =

Integrity Party Of Aotearoa New Zealand
- Leader: Helen Cartwright
- Deputy Leader: Troy Mihaka
- Founded: May 2020
- Split from: Sustainable NZ
- Ideology: Green liberalism Progressivism
- Political position: Centre
- Colours: Green, Red and Blue
- MPs in the House of Representatives: 0 / 120

Website
- https://www.tipanz.org/

The Integrity Party of Aotearoa New Zealand (TIPANZ) was an unregistered political party in New Zealand. It was a progressive-centrist party, with an ideology of Hauora (well-being), equality, and integrity. It was led by Helen Cartwright with Troy Mihaka as deputy.

== Foundation ==
The party was founded by former Sustainable New Zealand Party secretary Helen Cartwright and former Wellington local body candidate Troy Mihaka. Mihaka stood for election to Wellington City Council in 2019 for the centre-right Wellington Party.

== 2020 general election ==
The party intended to run both list and electorate candidates in New Zealand's 2020 election, but did not register so was unable to receive party votes. It ran two electoral candidates: Cartwright in Mana and Mihaka in Rongotai. In July 2020 Mihaka's candidate signs were painted with racist abuse, apparently due to the authorisation statement being written in the Māori language. Cartwright said in September 2020 that "If 100 people vote for me, I will be rapt; if 1000 people vote for me, I will do somersaults."

Neither candidate was successful; Cartwright received 360 votes, coming 7th, and Mihaka received 162, coming 8th.

The party did not run any candidates in the 2023 general election.
