= Mark Ball =

New Zealand politician

Mark Ball QSM JP
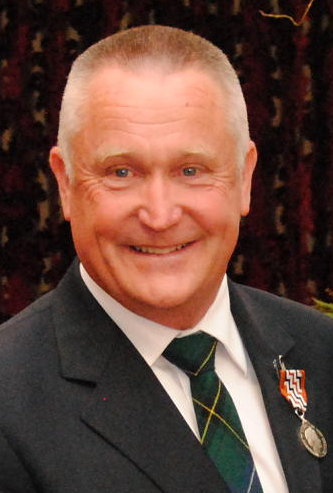
- Ball in 2013

Leader of Heartland NZ
- In office c. 2019–c. 2023

6th Mayor of Franklin District
- In office 9 October 2004 – 1 November 2010
- Preceded by: Heather Maloney
- Succeeded by: Len Brown (as Mayor of Auckland Council)

Personal details
- Occupation: Politician

Mark Robert Ball is a New Zealand politician and former police officer. He was mayor of the Franklin District, in the Auckland region, for six years until the position was disestablished in 2010. He served as leader of the Heartland New Zealand Party.

== Early life ==
Ball was a police officer for 17 years, policing the South Auckland area. He later owned a business, which he sold when elected as a mayor.

== Political career ==
=== Mayor of Franklin District ===
At the 2004 New Zealand local elections, Ball stood and won for the position of Mayor of Franklin. He was reelected at the 2007 local elections. In 2010, the Franklin District Council (along with the position of Mayor of Franklin) was abolished along with all other councils in the Auckland region when they were merged to form the single Auckland Council. Unlike several of the other Auckland Mayors, Ball did not run in the 2010 Auckland mayoral election for the position of Mayor of Auckland.

The Franklin District Council had applied to remain a standalone council instead of being amalgamated into the larger Auckland council, although this request was denied by then Minister of Local Government Rodney Hide. Ball stated he was "disappointed" with this decision. In a 2020 interview, a decade after the merger, Ball said that while there was no point going back to the multi-council structure, he believed a review of the supercity was needed, and that vital infrastructure in his region had been passed up in favour of upgrades in Auckland's CBD.

=== Heartland New Zealand ===
Mark Ball led the Heartland New Zealand Party, which was registered with the Electoral Commission in August 2020. Heartland was a rural-based party that opposes the New Zealand Emissions Trading Scheme, the Paris Agreement, and attempted to limit the environmental impacts of agriculture.

Ball contested the 2020 New Zealand general election for Heartland and was ranked first on its party list of five. He was also the party's only electorate candidate, contesting the electorate of Port Waikato, which contains the Franklin area. Ball received 8,462 electorate votes (21% of the vote) and came third with the seat won by National Party's Andrew Bayly winning the electorate with 15,635 votes (38%).

Since Ball, Heartland's only electorate candidate, did not win his electorate, and the party did not receive the required 5% of the party vote to enter Parliament, Heartland New Zealand did not gain any seats in the New Zealand House of Representatives.

== Personal life ==
Ball is married to Catherine. They have three adult children and live in Pukekohe. In the 2013 New Year Honours, he was awarded the Queen's Service Medal for services to the community.
