= Taitoa Wihone =

New Zealand environmental activist and political candidate

Taitoa Wihone (né Luke Leon Taitoa Wijohn; born 25 February 2002) is a New Zealand environmental activist and political candidate.

== Personal life ==
Wihone was born on 25 February 2002. He is of Māori descent. His iwi are Ngāpuhi, Ngāi Tūhoe, and Te Rarawa. He attended Māori immersion class at Richmond Road School and later attended Western Springs College, where he was captain of the hockey team. His mother Elisa Lavelle Wijohn was a breast cancer advocate until her death in 2022.

== Activism and politics ==
In 2017, Wihone volunteered on Julie Anne Genter's election campaign. In 2019, he helped lead the School Strike for Climate in Auckland, with a turnout of 80,000. He accepted the Ambassador of Conscience Award on behalf of the movement.

Wihone was selected by Chlöe Swarbrick for the 2019 New Zealand Youth Parliament. During general debate, he moved for the Youth Parliament to declare a climate emergency. The motion was passed in two minutes. Wihone and 78 other Youth MPs signed an open letter to their adult counterparts urging them to also declare a climate emergency.

In August 2019, Wihone and 13 other teenagers received a one year ban from parliament grounds by Speaker Trevor Mallard for singing "Tūtira Mai Ngā Iwi" and flying the Tino Rangatiratanga flag in the public gallery in support of the protests at Ihumātao.

Wihone was selected in February 2020 to contest Mount Albert in the 2020 New Zealand general election. Of several teen candidates, he was the youngest, turning 18 less than 8 months from the election. As with most Green Party candidates, he was campaigning primarily for the party vote. He was placed 18th on the party list. In the election he came third with 5.56% of the vote, and his list placement was not high enough to enter parliament.

On 27 August 2021, while under COVID-19 lockdown, Wihone observed the police in Wellington arresting a man and made a video of it. The police threatened to arrest him.

Wihone encouraged Swarbrick to challenge party co-leader James Shaw in the 2022 Green Party of Aotearoa New Zealand co-leadership election, but she declined.

Wihone supports lowering the voting age and improving civics education in schools. He supports a wealth tax and cannabis legalisation.
