= List of acts of the 53rd New Zealand Parliament =

This is a list of acts passed during the 53rd New Zealand Parliament (25 November 2020 onwards), the second parliament of the Sixth Labour Government of New Zealand (2017–2023). For lists of earlier acts, see Lists of acts of the New Zealand Parliament.

The 2020 speech from the throne outlined the government's legislative priorities for the term. These included: responding to the COVID-19 pandemic, housing, trades apprenticeships, and responding to climate change.

== 2020 ==
This is a list of acts passed during the 53rd New Zealand Parliament in 2020. after the commencement of the 53rd Parliament on 25 November 2020. For the earlier statutes of 2020, see List of acts of the 52nd New Zealand Parliament.

Title	Number	Date of Royal assent	Notes
Drug and Substance Checking Legislation Act 2020	2020/63	7 December 2020	
COVID-19 Public Health Response Amendment Act (No 2) 2020	2020/64	7 December 2020	
Taxation (Income Tax Rate and Other Amendments) Act 2020	2020/65	7 December 2020	
Subordinate Legislation Confirmation Act 2020	2020/66	11 December 2020	

== 2021 ==
This is a list of acts passed during the 53rd New Zealand Parliament in the year of 2021.

Title	Number	Date of Royal assent	Notes
Taxation (COVID-19 Resurgence Support Payments and Other Matters) Act 2021	2021/1	18 February 2021	
Food (Continuation of Dietary Supplements Regulations) Amendment Act 2021	2021/2	22 February 2021	
Local Electoral (Māori Wards and Māori Constituencies) Amendment Act 2021	2021/3	1 March 2021	
Climate Change Response (Auction Price) Amendment Act 2021	2021/4	12 March 2021	
Child Protection (Child Sex Offender Government Agency Registration) Amendment Act 2021	2021/5	22 March 2021	
Child Support Amendment Act 2021	2021/6	24 March 2021	
Secondary Legislation Act 2021	2021/7	24 March 2021	Corrections made under the Legislation Act 2012.
Secondary Legislation Act 2021	2021/7	24 March 2021	
Taxation (Annual Rates for 2020–21, Feasibility Expenditure, and Remedial Matters) Act 2021	2021/8	30 March 2021	Corrections made under the Legislation Act 2012.
Taxation (Annual Rates for 2020–21, Feasibility Expenditure, and Remedial Matters) Act 2021	2021/8	30 March 2021	
Regulatory Systems (Transport) Amendment Act 2021	2021/9	30 March 2021	
Holidays (Bereavement Leave for Miscarriage) Amendment Act 2021	2021/10	30 March 2021	
Ngāti Hinerangi Claims Settlement Act 2021	2021/11	12 April 2021	
Local Government (Rating of Whenua Māori) Amendment Act 2021	2021/12	12 April 2021	
Financial Market Infrastructures Act 2021	2021/13	10 May 2021	
Immigration (COVID-19 Response) Amendment Act 2021	2021/14	10 May 2021	
Appropriation (2019/20 Confirmation and Validation) Act 2021	2021/15	14 May 2021	
Medicines Amendment Act 2021	2021/16	24 May 2021	
Overseas Investment Amendment Act 2021	2021/17	24 May 2021	
Holidays (Increasing Sick Leave) Amendment Act 2021	2021/18	24 May 2021	
Taxation (Budget 2021 and Remedial Measures) Act 2021	2021/19	24 May 2021	
COVID-19 Public Health Response (Validation of Managed Isolation and Quarantine Charges) Amendment Act 2021	2021/20	24 May 2021	
Building (Building Products and Methods, Modular Components, and Other Matters) Amendment Act 2021	2021/21	7 June 2021	
Appropriation (2020/21 Supplementary Estimates) Act 2021	2021/22	24 June 2021	
Imprest Supply (First for 2021/22) Act 2021	2021/23	24 June 2021	
Intelligence and Security (Review) Amendment Act 2021	2021/24	28 June 2021	
Social Security (Financial Assistance for Caregivers) Amendment Act 2021	2021/25	28 June 2021	
Health (National Cervical Screening Programme) Amendment Act 2021	2021/26	28 June 2021	
District Court (Protection of Judgment Debtors with Disabilities) Amendment Act 2021	2021/27	5 July 2021	
Education and Training (Grants—Budget Measures) Amendment Act 2021	2021/28	12 July 2021	
Annual Reporting and Audit Time Frames Extensions Legislation Act 2021	2021/29	12 July 2021	
Gas (Information Disclosure and Penalties) Amendment Act 2021	2021/30	12 July 2021	
Reserve Bank of New Zealand Act 2021	2021/31	16 August 2021	
Fair Trading Amendment Act 2021	2021/32	16 August 2021	
Family Court (Supporting Children in Court) Legislation Act 2021	2021/33	16 August 2021	
Appropriation (2021/22 Estimates) Act 2021	2021/34	13 September 2021	
Imprest Supply (Second for 2021/22) Act 2021	2021/35	13 September 2021	
Water Services Act 2021	2021/36	4 October 2021	
Counter-Terrorism Legislation Act 2021	2021/37	4 October 2021	
Social Security (Subsequent Child Policy Removal) Amendment Act 2021	2021/38	4 October 2021	
Financial Sector (Climate-related Disclosures and Other Matters) Amendment Act 2021	2021/39	27 October 2021	
Regional Comprehensive Economic Partnership (RCEP) Legislation Act 2021	2021/40	27 October 2021	
Mental Health (Compulsory Assessment and Treatment) Amendment Act 2021	2021/41	29 October 2021	
COVID-19 Response (Management Measures) Legislation Act 2021	2021/42	2 November 2021	
Films, Videos, and Publications Classification (Urgent Interim Classification of Publications and Prevention of Online Harm) Amendment Act 2021	2021/43	2 November 2021	
Health (Fluoridation of Drinking Water) Amendment Act 2021	2021/44	15 November 2021	
Maritime Transport (MARPOL Annex VI) Amendment Act 2021	2021/45	15 November 2021	
New Zealand Superannuation and Retirement Income (Fair Residency) Amendment Act 2021	2021/46	15 November 2021	
Education and Training (Teaching Council Fees, Levies, and Costs) Amendment Act 2021	2021/47	19 November 2021	
COVID-19 Public Health Response Amendment Act 2021	2021/48	19 November 2021	
Moriori Claims Settlement Act 221	2021/49	25 November 2021	
Drug and Substance Checking Legislation Act 2021	2021/50	25 November 2021	
COVID-19 Response (Vaccinations) Legislation Act 2021	2021/51	25 November 2021	
Taxation (COVID-19 Support Payments and Working for Families Tax Credits) Act 2021	2021/52	25 November 2021	
Crown Minerals (Decommissioning and Other Matters) Amendment Act 2021	2021/53	1 December 2021	
Ahuriri Hapū Claims Settlement Act 2021	2021/54	13 December 2021	
Rights for Victims of Insane Offenders Act 2021	2021/55	13 December 2021	Member's bill
Subordinate Legislation Confirmation Act 2021	2021/56	13 December 2021	
Births, Deaths, Marriages, and Relationships Registration Act 2021	2021/57	15 December 2021	
Education and Training Amendment Act 2021	2021/58	15 December 2021	
Resource Management (Enabling Housing Supply and Other Matters) Amendment Act 2021	2021/59	20 December 2021	Editorial changes made under the Legislation Act 2019.
Resource Management (Enabling Housing Supply and Other Matters) Amendment Act 2021	2021/59	20 December 2021	
Sexual Violence Legislation Act 2021	2021/60	20 December 2021	
Sexual Violence Legislation Act 2021	2021/60	20 December 2021	Editorial changes made under the Legislation Act 2019.
Gambling (Reinstating COVID-19 Modification) Amendment Act 2021	2021/61	20 December 2021	

== 2022 ==
This is a list of acts passed during the 53rd New Zealand Parliament in the year of 2022.

Title	Number	Date of Royal assent	Notes
Conversion Practices Prohibition Legislation Act 2022	2022/1	18 February 2022	
Land Transport (Clean Vehicles) Amendment Act 2022	2022/2	22 February 2022	
Harmful Digital Communications (Unauthorised Posting of Intimate Visual Recording) Amendment Act 2022	2022/3	8 March 2022	
Sunscreen (Product Safety Standard) Act 2022	2022/4	8 March 2022	Member's bill
Land Transport (Drug Driving) Amendment Act 2022	2022/5	11 March 2022	
Land Transport (Drug Driving) Amendment Act 2022	2022/5	11 March 2022	Editorial changes made under the Legislation Act 2019.
Russia Sanctions Act 2022	2022/6	11 March 2022	
Ngāti Rangitihi Claims Settlement Act 2022	2022/7	18 March 2022	
Contraception, Sterilisation, and Abortion (Safe Areas) Amendment Act 2022	2022/8	18 March 2022	Member's bill
Ngāti Maru (Taranaki) Claims Settlement Act 2022	2022/9	30 March 2022	
Taxation (Annual Rates for 2021–22, GST, and Remedial Matters) Act 2022	2022/10	30 March 2022	
Commerce Amendment Act 2022	2022/11	5 April 2022	Editorial changes made under the Legislation Act 2019.
Commerce Amendment Act 2022	2022/11	5 April 2022	
Incorporated Societies Act 2022	2022/12	5 April 2022	
Road User Charges (Temporary RUC Reduction Scheme) Amendment Act 2022	2022/13	11 April 2022	
Te Kāhui o Matariki Public Holiday Act 2022; Te Ture mō te Hararei Tūmatanui o te Kāhui o Matariki 2022	2022/14	11 April 2022	
Maori Commercial Aquaculture Claims Settlement Amendment Act 2022	2022/15	11 April 2022	
COVID-19 Response (Courts Safety) Legislation Act 2022	2022/16	20 April 2022	
Appropriation (2020/21 Confirmation and Validation) Act 2022	2022/17	9 May 2022	
Human Rights (Disability Assist Dogs Non-Discrimination) Amendment Act 2022	2022/18	9 May 2022	
Unit Titles (Strengthening Body Corporate Governance and Other Matters) Amendment Act 2022	2022/19	9 May 2022	
Protected Disclosures (Protection of Whistleblowers) Act 2022	2022/20	13 May 2022	
Retail Payment System Act 2022	2022/21	13 May 2022	
Crown Pastoral Land Reform Act 2022	2022/22	17 May 2022	
Maritime Powers Act 2022	2022/23	20 May 2022	
Local Government (Pecuniary Interests Register) Amendment Act 2022	2022/24	20 May 2022	
Taxation (Cost of Living Payments) Act 2022	2022/25	24 May 2022	
Income Insurance Scheme (Enabling Development) Act 2022	2022/26	24 May 2022	
Companies Office Registers Funding Validation Act 2022	2022/27	24 May 2022	
Customs and Excise (Tobacco Products) Amendment Act 2022	2022/28	24 May 2022	
Coroners (Coronial Cap) Amendment Act 2022	2022/29	24 May 2022	
Pae Ora (Healthy Futures) Act 2022	2022/30	14 June 2022	Editorial changes made under the Legislation Act 2019.
Pae Ora (Healthy Futures) Act 2022	2022/30	14 June 2022	
Medicines Amendment Act 2022	2022/31	22 June 2022	
Support Workers (Pay Equity) Settlements Amendment Act 2022	2022/32	28 June 2022	
Appropriation (2021/22 Supplementary Estimates) Act 2022	2022/33	29 June 2022	
Imprest Supply (First for 2022/23) Act 2022	2022/34	29 June 2022	
Commerce (Grocery Sector Covenants) Amendment Act 2022	2022/35	29 June 2022	
Financial Markets (Conduct of Institutions) Amendment Act 2022	2022/36	29 June 2022	
Local Electoral (Advertising) Amendment Act 2022	2022/37	29 June 2022	
Education and Training Amendment Act 2022	2022/38	29 July 2022	
Education and Training Amendment Act 2022	2022/38	29 July 2022	Editorial changes made under the Legislation Act 2019.
Data and Statistics Act 2022	2022/39	8 August 2022	
Data and Statistics Act 2022	2022/39	8 August 2022	Editorial changes made under the Legislation Act 2019.
Canterbury Regional Council (Ngāi Tahu Representation) Act 2022	Local Act 2022/1	8 August 2022	Local Act
Three Strikes Legislation Repeal Act 2022	2022/40	15 August 2022	
Three Strikes Legislation Repeal Act 2022	2022/40	15 August 2022	Editorial change made under the Legislation Act 2019.
Firearms Prohibition Orders Legislation Act 2022	2022/41	15 August 2022	New section and editorial change made under the Legislation Act 2019.
Firearms Prohibition Orders Legislation Act 2022	2022/41	15 August 2022	
Overseas Investment (Forestry) Amendment Act 2022	2022/42	15 August 2022	
Oversight of Oranga Tamariki System Act 2022	2022/43	29 August 2022	
Children's Commissioner Act 2022	2022/44	29 August 2022	Editorial change made under the Legislation Act 2019.
Children's Commissioner Act 2022	2022/44	29 August 2022	
New Zealand Bill of Rights (Declarations of Inconsistency) Amendment Act 2022	2022/45	29 August 2022	
Electricity Industry Amendment Act 2022	2022/46	31 August 2022	
Electricity Industry Amendment Act 2022	2022/46	31 August 2022	Editorial changes made under the Legislation Act 2019.
Palmerston North Reserves Empowering Amendment Act 2022	Local Act 2022/2	5 September 2022	Local Act
Appropriation (2022/23 Estimates) Act 2022	2022/47	21 September 2022	
Imprest Supply (Second for 2022/23) Act 2022	2022/48	21 September 2022	
Queen Elizabeth II Memorial Day Act 2022	2022/49	21 September 2022	
Maniapoto Claims Settlement Act 2022	2022/50	27 September 2022	
Accident Compensation (Maternal Birth Injury and Other Matters) Amendment Act 2022	2022/51	30 September 2022	
Screen Industry Workers Act 2022	2022/52	30 September 2022	
Animal Welfare Amendment Act 2022	2022/53	30 September 2022	
Plain Language Act 2022	2022/54	21 October 2022	
Biosecurity (Information for Incoming Passengers) Amendment Act 2022	2022/55	21 October 2022	
Fisheries Amendment Act 2022	2022/56	31 October 2022	
Hazardous Substances and New Organisms (Hazardous Substances Assessments) Amendment Act 2022	2022/57	31 October 2022	
Fair Pay Agreements Act 2022	2022/58	1 November 2022	
Fair Pay Agreements Act 2022	2022/58	1 November 2022	Editorial changes made under the Legislation Act 2019.
United Kingdom Free Trade Agreement Legislation Act 2022	2022/59	15 November 2022	
Apple Transitional Export Quota Act 2022	2022/60	15 November 2022	
Plant Variety Rights Act 2022	2022/61	18 November 2022	
Electoral (Māori Electoral Option) Legislation Act 2022	2022/62	18 November 2022	
Residential Tenancies (Healthy Homes Standards) Amendment Act 2022	2022/63	25 November 2022	
Land Transport (Clean Vehicles) Amendment Act (No 2) 2022	2022/64	25 November 2022	
Social Security (Accommodation Supplement) Amendment Act 2022	2022/65	25 November 2022	
COVID-19 Public Health Response (Extension of Act and Reduction of Powers) Amendment Act 2022	2022/66	25 November 2022	
Dairy Industry Restructuring (Fonterra Capital Restructuring) Amendment Act 2022	2022/67	28 November 2022	
Climate Change Response (Extension of Penalty Transition for Forestry Activities with Low Volume Emissions Liabilities) Amendment Act 2022	2022/68	28 November 2022	
Arms (Licence Holders' Applications for New Licences) Amendment Act 2022	2022/69	28 November 2022	
Companies (Levies) Amendment Act 2022	2022/70	28 November 2022	
Security Information in Proceedings Act 2022	2022/71	28 November 2022	
Security Information in Proceedings Act 2022	2022/71	28 November 2022	Editorial changes made under the Legislation Act 2019.
Security Information in Proceedings (Repeals and Amendments) Act 2022	2022/72	28 November 2022	
Security Information in Proceedings (Repeals and Amendments) Act 2022	2022/72	28 November 2022	New section and editorial changes made under the Legislation Act 2019.
Māori Purposes Act 2022	2022/73	28 November 2022	
Remuneration Authority Legislation Act 2022	2022/74	28 November 2022	
Statutes Amendment Act 2022	2022/75	29 November 2022	
Te Rohe o Rongokako Joint Redress Act 2022	2022/76	12 December 2022	
Water Services Entities Act 2022	2022/77	14 December 2022	
Water Services Entities Act 2022	2022/77	14 December 2022	Editorial changes made under the Legislation Act 2019.
Ngāti Kahungunu ki Wairarapa Tāmaki nui-a-Rua Claims Settlement Act 2022	2022/78	16 December 2022	
Smokefree Environments and Regulated Products (Smoked Tobacco) Amendment Act 2022	2022/79	16 December 2022	
Electoral Amendment Act 2022	2022/80	16 December 2022	
Oranga Tamariki Amendment Act 2022	2022/81	16 December 2022	
Secondary Legislation Confirmation Act 2022	2022/82	16 December 2022	

== 2023 ==
This is an incomplete list of acts passed during the 53rd New Zealand Parliament in the year of 2023.

Title	Number	Date of Royal assent	Notes
Natural Hazards Insurance Act 2023	2023/1	27 February 2023	
Road User Charges (Temporary RUC Reduction Scheme) Amendment Act 2023	2023/2	27 February 2023	
Returning Offenders (Management and Information) Amendment Act 2023	2023/3	27 February 2023	Editorial changes made under Legislation Act 2019.
Returning Offenders (Management and Information) Amendment Act 2023	2023/3	27 February 2023	
Severe Weather Emergency Legislation Act 2023	2023/4	20 March 2023	
Taxation (Annual Rates for 2022–23, Platform Economy, and Remedial Matters) Act 2023	2023/5	31 March 2023	
Taxation (Annual Rates for 2022–23, Platform Economy, and Remedial Matters) Act 2023	2023/5	31 March 2023	Editorial changes made under Legislation Act 2019.
Criminal Proceeds (Recovery) Amendment Act 2023	2023/6	31 March 2023	
Criminal Activity Intervention Legislation Act 2023	2023/7	4 April 2023	
Coroners Amendment Act 2023	2023/8	4 April 2023	
Foreign Affairs (Consular Loans) Amendment Act 2023	2023/9	4 April 2023	
Civil Aviation Act 2023	2023/10	5 April 2023	
Civil Aviation Amendment Act 2023	2023/11	5 April 2023	
Construction Contracts (Retention Money) Amendment Act 2023	2023/12	5 April 2023	
Digital Identity Services Trust Framework Act 2023	2023/13	5 April 2023	
Organic Products and Production Act 2023	2023/14	5 April 2023	
Fire and Emergency New Zealand (Levy) Amendment Act 2023	2023/15	5 April 2023	
Crimes (Child Exploitation Offences) Amendment Act 2023	2023/16	12 April 2023	
Severe Weather Emergency Recovery Legislation Act 2023	2023/17	12 April 2023	
Counter-Terrorism Acts (Designations and Control Orders) Amendment Act 2023	2023/18	9 May 2023	
Appropriation (2021/22 Confirmation and Validation) Act 2023	2023/19	17 May 2023	
Forests (Legal Harvest Assurance) Amendment Act 2023	2023/20	19 May 2023	
Customs and Excise (Arrival Information) Amendment Act 2023	2023/21	19 May 2023	
Energy Resources Levy Amendment Act 2023	2023/22	19 May 2023	
Energy (Fuels, Levies, and References) Amendment Act 2023	2023/23	19 May 2023	
Self-contained Motor Vehicles Legislation Act 2023	2023/24	6 June 2023	
Family Court (Family Court Associates) Legislation Act 2023	2023/25	6 June 2023	
Accident Compensation (Access Reporting and Other Matters) Amendment Act 2023	2023/26	6 June 2023	
Child Support (Pass On) Acts Amendment Act 2023	2023/27	12 June 2023	
Employment Relations (Extended Time for Personal Grievance for Sexual Harassment) Amendment Act 2023	2023/28	12 June 2023	
Sale and Supply of Alcohol (Exemption for Race Meetings) Amendment Act 2023	2023/29	12 June 2023	
Health and Safety at Work (Health and Safety Representatives and Committees) Amendment Act 2023	2023/30	12 June 2023	
Grocery Industry Competition Act 2023	2023/31	26 June 2023	
Appropriation (2022/23 Supplementary Estimates) Act 2023	2023/32	29 June 2023	
Imprest Supply (First for 2023/24) Act 2023	2023/33	29 June 2023	
Charities Amendment Act 2023	2023/34	5 July 2023	
Deposit Takers Act 2023	2023/35	6 July 2023	
Worker Protection (Migrant and Other Employees) Act 2023	2023/36	6 July 2023	
Therapeutic Products Act 2023	2023/37	26 July 2023	
Fuel Industry Amendment Act 2023	2023/38	26 July 2023	
Sale and Supply of Alcohol (Rugby World Cup 2023 Extended Trading Hours) Amendment Act 2023	2023/39	26 July 2023	
Business Payment Practices Act 2023	2023/40	26 July 2023	
Local Government Official Information and Meetings Amendment Act 2023	2023/41	26 July 2023	
Inspector-General of Defence Act 2023	2023/42	26 July 2023	
Companies (Directors' Duties) Amendment Act 2023	2023/43	3 August 2023	
Water Services Entities Amendment Act 2023	2023/44	22 August 2023	
Education and Training Amendment Act 2023	2023/45	22 August 2023	
Natural and Built Environment Act 2023	2023/46	23 August 2023	
Spatial Planning Act 2023	2023/47	23 August 2023	
Integrity Sport and Recreation Act 2023	2023/48	23 August 2023	
Climate Change Response (Late Payment Penalties and Industrial Allocation) Amendment Act 2023	2023/49	24 August 2023	
Appropriation (2023/24 Estimates) Act 2023	2023/50	24 August 2023	
Imprest Supply (Second for 2023/24) Act 2023	2023/51	24 August 2023	
Water Services Legislation Act 2023	2023/52	30 August 2023	
Crown Minerals Amendment Act 2023	2023/53	30 August 2023	
Water Services Economic Efficiency and Consumer Protection Act 2023	2023/54	30 August 2023	
Taxation Principles Reporting Act 2023	2023/55	30 August 2023	
Land Transport Management (Regulation of Public Transport) Amendment Act 2023	2023/56	30 August 2023	
Local Government Electoral Legislation Act 2023	2023/57	30 August 2023	
Fuel Industry (Improving Fuel Resilience) Amendment Act 2023	2023/58	30 August 2023	
Resale Right for Visual Artists Act 2023	2023/59	30 August 2023	
Sale and Supply of Alcohol (Community Participation) Amendment Act 2023	2023/60	30 August 2023	
Legal Services Amendment Act 2023	2023/61	30 August 2023	
Land Transport (Road Safety) Amendment Act 2023	2023/62	31 August 2023	
Parole Amendment Act 2023	2023/63	31 August 2023	
