= Second term of the Sixth Labour Government of New Zealand =

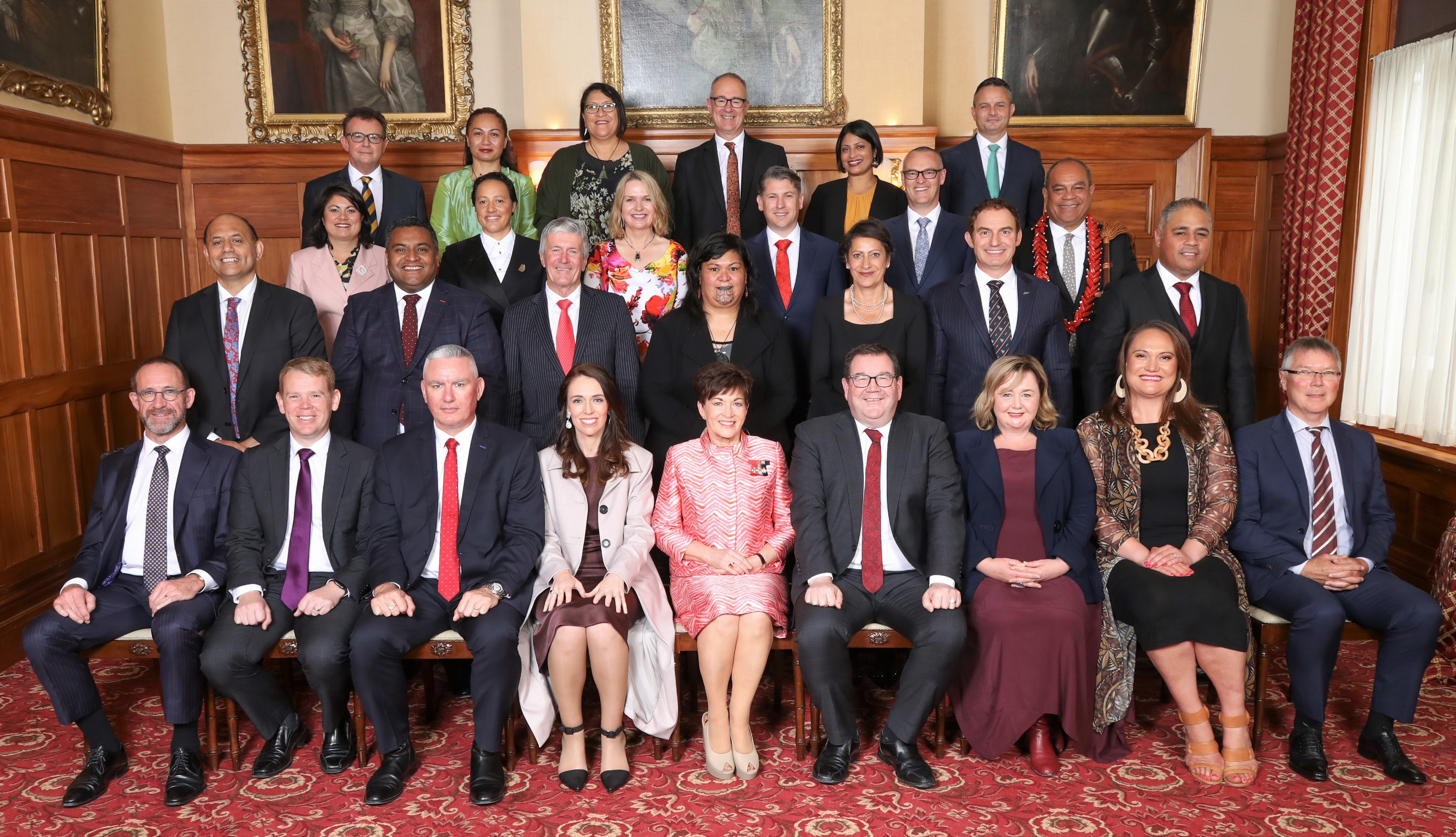
Ministers pictured after their swearing-in, in November 2020.

The second term of the Sixth Labour Government of New Zealand lasted between 2020 and 2023. It was formed following the Labour Party's landslide victory in the 2020 New Zealand general election. In mid-January 2023, Prime Minister Jacinda Ardern resigned and was succeeded by Chris Hipkins. During the 2023 New Zealand general election held on 14 October, Labour lost its majority to the opposition National Party. The Government remained in a caretaker capacity until the new National–led coalition government was sworn in on 27 November 2023.

== 2020 ==
On 17 October, Labour won the 2020 general election in a landslide, winning 50% of the vote and 65 seats in the House, the first time under the current MMP system that any party won enough seats to govern without a coalition or a confidence and supply agreement.

On 20 October, Newshub reported that Ardern was not intending to forge a formal coalition with the Green Party but was exploring the possibility of a lower-level support arrangement due to Labour's large parliamentary majority. During the 2020 election campaign on 14 October, Ardern had ruled out the Green's wealth tax policy.

Following prolonged negotiations, the Green Party agreed to enter into a cooperation agreement with the Labour Party on 31 October. Under this governing arrangement, co-leader James Shaw would remain Minister for Climate Change and become Associate Environment Minister while fellow co-leader Marama Davidson would become Minister for the Prevention of Family and Sexual Violence and Associate Minister of Housing. During a Zoom call, 85% of the 150 Green Party delegates voted to accept this cooperation agreement with Labour.

On 18 November, the Tourism Minister Stuart Nash announced that the Government would introduce legislation to ban tourists from hiring vans that are not self-contained in order to reduce the waster problems associated with freedom camping. He also announced that Tourism New Zealand would be redirecting marketing to focus on "super wealthy" tourists from Europe, North America, and parts of Asia. That same day, Ardern and Education Minister Chris Hipkins announced a marketing campaign to encourage young people particularly women to enter vocational education and the trades.

On 18 November, Foreign Minister Mahuta joined her Australian, Canadian, British and United States counterparts in condemning the disqualification of pro-democracy Hong Kong legislators as a breach of Hong Kong's autonomy and rights under the Sino-British Joint Declaration. In response, the Chinese Foreign Ministry's spokesperson Zhao Lijian warned the Five Eyes countries, stating that "No matter if they have five eyes or 10 eyes, if they dare to harm China's sovereignty, security and development interests, they should beware of their eyes being poked and blinded." In response, Mahuta defended New Zealand's commitment to free speech, free media, and democracy.

On 26 November, the Government confirmed during its Speech from the Throne that the COVID-19 vaccine would be made free as part of its goal of keeping New Zealanders safe from COVID-19. Other key issues and promises addressed within the speech included building 18,000 public homes, raising the minimum wage, replacing the Resource Management Act 1991 and promoting economic recovery from COVID-19 through infrastructure investment and training incentives.

On 2 December 2020, Ardern declared a climate change emergency in New Zealand and pledged that the Government would be carbon neutral by 2025 through a parliamentary motion. As part of this commitment towards carbon neutrality under the framework of the Climate Change Response (Zero Carbon) Amendment Act, the public sector will be required to buy only electric or hybrid vehicles, government buildings will have to meet new building standards, and all 200 coal-fired boilers in public service buildings will be phased out. This motion was supported by the Labour, Green, and Māori parties but was opposed by the opposition National and ACT parties, which described the motion as "virtue signaling."

In mid-December, Ardern announced that New Zealand would be establishing travel bubbles with the Cook Islands and Australia the following year, facilitating two-way quarantine travel between these countries. On 17 December, Ardern also announced that the Government had purchased two more vaccines from the pharmaceutical companies AstraZeneca and Novavax for New Zealand, Tokelau, the Cook Islands, Niue and its Pacific partners Samoa, Tonga, and Tuvalu.

On 21 December, Immigration Minister Kris Faafoi announced a six-month extension for employer-assisted work and working holiday visa holders along with their partners and children in order to address New Zealand's labour shortage. In addition, a 12-month stand-down period for low-paid Essential Skills visa holders working in New Zealand for three years was also suspended until January 2022.

== 2021 ==
On 3 January 2021, COVID-19 Response Minister Chris Hipkins announced that travelers entering New Zealand from the United Kingdom and United States would be required to take pre-departure tests from 15 January 2021. From 26 January, the pre-departure test requirement was extended to all international travelers with the exception of those coming from Australia, Antarctica, and most Pacific Island states including Fiji, Samoa, Tokelau, Tuvalu, and Vanuatu. On 15 January, Ardern announced the establishment of a one-way travel bubble for Cook Islanders traveling to New Zealand.

On 1 February 2021, the Minister of Local Government Nanaia Mahuta announced that the Government would pass legislation upholding local council's decisions to establish Māori wards and constituencies. This new law would also abolish an existing law allowing local referendums to veto decisions by councils to establish Māori wards. The Government intends to pass it into law before the scheduled 2022 local body elections.

On 3 February 2021, Ardern approved the Pfizer-BioNTech COVID-19 vaccine for use in New Zealand. The initial batches of the vaccine are scheduled to arrive in late March 2021, with frontline workers and the vulnerable given priority.

On 4 February 2021 Ardern announced that a new public holiday Matariki would be introduced on 24 June 2022. This fulfilled her election pledge in September 2020 to make Matariki a public holiday if Labour was re-elected during the 2020 general election.

On 5 February, Immigration New Zealand confirmed that New Zealand's refugee resettlement programme, which had been suspended in 2020 as a result of the COVID-19 pandemic, would resume. The Government plans to resettled 210 refugees by 30 June 2021. Refugees will undergo a two-week stay in managed isolation.

On 9 February, Foreign Minister Nanaia Mahuta announced the suspension of high-level bilateral military and political relations with Myanmar following the 2021 Myanmar coup d'état. They joined other Western governments in refusing to recognise the new military-led government and calling for the restoration of civilian-led rule. In addition, aid projects were diverted away from the Tatmadaw and a travel ban was imposed on Myanmar's military leaders.

On 11 February, Stuff reported that the Government's New Zealand Work Scheme to address the labour shortage in the fruit-picking sector caused by COVID-19 had only attracted 54 people since its launch in late November 2020. The scheme had offered up to NZ$200 to cover accommodation costs and a NZ$1,000 incentive payment to workers who had completed jobs that lasted for six weeks or longer.

On 13 February 2020, the Government agreed to pay NZ$40 million to 212 kiwifruit orchardists and Te Puke–based post harvest operator Seeka in order to settle a class action lawsuit alleging that the Government was liable for losses caused by the incursion of the kiwifruit vine disease Pseudomonas syringae (PSA), which swept through the Bay of Plenty region in 2010. Kiwifruit orchardists had initially challenged a Court of Appeal ruling that the Government could not be held liable for the damage caused by PSA despite the Ministry of Primary Industries allowing PSA into the country through the import of kiwifruit pollen from China. As a result of the settlement, the appeal was withdrawn.

On 14 February, Ardern announced that Auckland would move into an Alert Level 3 lockdown from 11:59pm that night for a period of three days. The rest of New Zealand will move into an Alert Level 2 lockdown for the same time period. The three-day lockdown is meant for the Government to get more information about a new community outbreak in Papatoetoe, South Auckland. Under Level 3, remote work is encouraged, while schools and day care centers continue to serve the children of essential workers. Limits have also been placed on public gatherings and travel around Auckland. Under Level 2, gatherings are restricted to 100 people and travel to Auckland is restricted.

On 15 February, the Government tabled its response to the report of the Social Services and Community Committee on Matters related to Forced Adoptions. At the same time, Minister of Justice Kris Faafoi announced that the Government would pursue reform of adoption laws during the 53rd Parliament. The Government had already referred a review of surrogacy laws to the Law Commission, the adoption inquiry is therefore to be conducted by the Ministry of Justice.

On 24 February, it was reported that the Government's Progressive Home Ownership Scheme, which cost NZ$17 million, had only resettled 12 families in the last seven months. While Housing Minister Megan Woods defended the scheme's achievements, National's housing spokesperson Nicola Willis described the program as a failure.

On 25 February, the Local Government Minister Nanaia Mahuta's Local Electoral (Māori Wards and Māori Constituencies) Amendment Act 2021, which eliminated mechanisms for holding public referendums on the establishment of Māori wards and constituencies on local bodies, passed its third reading. The Bill was supported by the Labour, Green and Māori parties but opposed by the opposition National and ACT parties. National attempted to delay the bill by mounting a twelve-hour filibuster challenging all of the Bill's ten clauses.

On 2 March, Ardern and Health Minister Andrew Little announced that the Government would be appointing a panel of experts to review the drug-purchasing agency Pharmac's timeliness and transparency of decision-making.

On 23 March, Ardern and Housing Minister Megan Woods announced a housing package to address the country's housing shortage, which includes a $3.8 billion housing acceleration fund, increases to First Home Products' income caps, changes to regional price caps, extending "bright-line tests" to ten years, eliminating the interest deductibility loophole on residential property, and extending the Apprenticeship Boost initiative to support the trades and trade training, and borrowing $2 billion to increase land acquisition in order to boost the supply of housing. The NZ Property Investors Federation President Andrew King criticised the Government's decision to eliminate interest rate tax deductions for landlords. The Government's housing package was welcomed by Green finance spokesperson Julie Anne Genter.

On 14 April, the New Zealand Government confirmed that a ban on live cattle exports by sea would be implemented over the two next years. The ban came as a result of a review into livestock exports launched two years ago by Agricultural Minister Damien O'Connor. The Government's ban on live cattle exports was criticised by the Animal Genetics Trade Association which complained that the ban would prevent the export of breeding cows, which would potentially lead to the culling of 150,000 calves. By contrast, the animal welfare NGO SAFE welcomed the ban, stating that it would mean that animals would no longer suffer in countries with lower standards of animal welfare than New Zealand.

On 21 April, Health Minister Andrew Little announced that the existing 20 district health boards will be abolished and replaced by a new public health agency known as Health New Zealand, which will be modeled after the United Kingdom's National Health Service. In addition, a new Māori Health Authority will be established to set up policies for Māori health and to oversee the provision of Māori health services. A Public Health Authority will also be established to centralise public health work.

On 18 May, the Health Minister Andrew Little announced that the Government would seek to amend Section 23 of the Medicines Act 1981 after the High Court Judge Rebecca Ellis ruled in favour of the Ngai Kaitiaki Tuku Ihu Medical Action Society's contention that the Government's decision to approve the Pfizer–BioNTech COVID-19 vaccine exceeded the powers of the Medicines Act. The Medical Action Society had argued that this action would have undermined public trust in the vaccine and wasted vaccine stock already in use in New Zealand.

On 14 June 2021, the Government announced that it would introduce subsidies to make electric vehicles cheaper while raising the price of new petrol and new diesel vehicles, commencing in July. This policy announcement followed a report by the Climate Change Commission on 9 June 2021 advocating the reduction of farm animal numbers, a ban on new household gas connections by 2025, and a shift to electric vehicles in order to reduce greenhouse emissions. In response to the policy announcement, EV City owner David Boot said that it would boost demand for electric cars while expressing concern about the need for educating electric car users. Motor Trade Association chief executive Craig Pomare claimed that the rebate would not be enough to encourage motor users to make the switch to electric cars while Federated Farmers national president Andrew Hoggard expressed concerns about the lack of electric vehicle alternatives for farmers and tradespersons.

In mid–June 2021, Ardern announced that the New Zealand Government would formally apologise for the dawn raids which had disproportionately targeted members of the Pasifika communities during the 1970s and 1980s. This official apology will take place at the Auckland Town Hall on 26 June 2021. The Government's apology announcement was supported by both the Minister for Pacific Peoples William Sio and National Party leader Judith Collins.

On 7 July, the ACT party alleged that the Labour Government had spent $4 million-worth of Parliament's time asking itself questions since the 2020 election, in response to criticism of ACT's use of 15 minutes to ask its leader David Seymour questions about his member's bill, which has been described as "extremely unlikely to ever become law." Ministers being asked questions by their own party's MPs has been a feature of Question Time under successive governments for decades. The Shadow Leader of the House, National MP Chris Bishop, who has been critical of the use of "patsy questions" in the past, said that Seymour was showing "remarkable hutzpah" in complaining about the practice the day after making use of it himself.

On 16 July, the farmers advocacy group Groundswell NZ staged a nationwide protest campaign called "Howl of a Protest" in 57 towns and cities across New Zealand to protest the Government's freshwater, biodiversity, winter grazing, climate change, and Clean Car Package rebate scheme (known as the "Ute tax"). Farmers, tradespersons and agricultural sector professionals claimed that the so-called "Ute tax" discriminated Ute users due to the lack of electrical alternatives. In response, the Agriculture Minister Damien O'Connor stated that farmers had a right to speak their mind but warned that Groundswell's protests would create the perception that farmers were opposed to improving freshwater quality, addressing climate change, managing animal welfare, and ignored the Government's efforts to work with the sector. Meanwhile, Ardern defended the Government's commitment to the environment and brushed off suggestions of a rural-urban divide in New Zealand.

On 30 July 2021, Justice Minister Kris Faafoi introduced the Conversion Practices Prohibition Legislation Bill with the goal of banning conversion therapy. On 6 August 2021, the Bill passed its first reading with the support of all political parties except the opposition National Party, which wanted provisions protecting parents from prosecution.

On 16 August, Ardern and New Zealand Defence Force chief Air Marshal Kevin Short announced that New Zealand would deploy 40 troops to evacuate 53 New Zealanders and 37 Afghans who had worked for the NZ military in response to the 2021 Taliban offensive. The Afghan evacuees include nuclear family members, numbering about 200 individuals. By 23 August, the first batch of Afghan evacuees had arrived in New Zealand via the United Arab Emirates, where arrangements were made for their travel to New Zealand with the assistance of the Australian Defence Force. In addition, New Zealand provided $3 million in funding for the International Committee of the Red Cross and the United Nations High Commissioner for Refugees in Afghanistan. The Taliban's Cultural Commission representative Abdul Qahar Balkhi welcomed New Zealand's humanitarian aid to the Afghan people.

On 17 August, the Government reinstated Alert Level 4 restrictions on New Zealand in response to a community outbreak of the Delta variant in Auckland. In response to the spread of community cases in Auckland and Wellington, the lockdown was extended for the rest of the month on 20 August and 23 August. On 23 August, Parliament was suspended for a week with the exception of online select committee hearings. National Party leader Judith Collins and ACT Party leader David Seymour criticised this suspension as undemocratic and an "overreach of power."

Following the 2021 Taliban offensive which led to a significant exodus of Afghan refugees, the Ministry of Foreign Affairs and Trade suspended the processing of residency applications from Afghan nationals in late August 2021, citing the "rapidly deteriorating situation" caused by the Taliban offensive which complicated international evacuation efforts. The Government's decision to suspend the processing of Afghan residency visa applications was criticised by human rights advocates and Afghan migrants. Former Afghan interpreter Diamond Kazimi stated that 200 Afghan families who had assisted the NZDF were still waiting for their visa applications to be processed. By 26 August, a Royal New Zealand Air Force (RNZAF) C-130 Hercules had made two evacuation flights from Kabul. That same day, the RNZAF suspended its evacuation flights following the 2021 Kabul airport attacks. By that stage, 370 people had been evacuated to the United Arab Emirates, where they were transferred to New Zealand.

On 23 August, the Government temporarily suspended the sitting of the New Zealand Parliament for one week at the advice of Director-General of Health Ashley Bloomfield. Select committees will continue online. The suspension of Parliament was criticised by National Party leader Collins and ACT Party leader Seymour as undemocratic and an "overreach of power." Labour, the Greens and the opposition Māori Party proposed a virtual Zoom Parliament and Question Time but National COVID-19 spokesperson Chris Bishop countered that Parliament should be able to go ahead if the Prime Minister was able to hold press conferences at Level 4. On 31 August, Speaker Trevor Mallard confirmed that Parliament would continue meeting under Alert Level 4 conditions with only ten MPs and a small number of staff attending the debating chamber. While Labour, National, the ACT, and Green parties agreed to send MPs, the Māori Party stated that it would not since it was unsafe.

On 22 September, the Government announced a ten-year plan called Kia Manawanui for improving mental health outcomes including setting up an external oversight group headed by Auckland University of Technology (AUT) professor and Waitematā District Health Board chair Judy McGregor. In response, the National Party's mental health spokesperson Matt Doocey criticised the plan, stating that " what is needed now is action, not more vision statements, working groups and nice words." In mid-September, the Government also announced the members of the interim boards of Health New Zealand and the Māori Health Authority. Health NZ will be chaired by Rob Campbell while the Health Authority will be led by co-chairs Sharon Shea and Tipa Mahuta.

On 30 September, the Counter-Terrorism Legislation Act 2021 passed its third reading, introducing new counter-terrorism laws which criminalise the planning of terror attacks and expand the powers of police to conduct warrantless searches. The counter-terrorism bill was supported by the Labour and National parties but was opposed by the Green, ACT and Māori parties. That same day, the Government introduced the Te Kāhui o Matariki Public Holiday Bill to make the Māori New Year Matariki a public holiday. During its first reading, the bill was supported by the Labour, Green and Māori parties but opposed by National and ACT.

On 30 September, Immigration Minister Kris Faafoi announced that the Government would introduce a one-off simplified residency pathway known as the "2021 Resident Visa" for migrants on work visas residing in New Zealand including their families. Faafoi estimated that 165,000 migrants would be eligible for the 2021 Resident Visa programme, which will be rolled out in two phases in December 2021 and March 2022. According to Faafoi, the scheme was meant to address the impact of closed borders and economic hardship caused by COVID-19 on migrants. The announcement was welcomed by the National Party's immigration spokesperson Erica Stanford and Migrant Workers Association President Anu Kaloti for addressing the needs and concerns of migrants.

On 7 October, Foreign Minister Mahuta confirmed that the Government was sending a special representative to the Middle East to help 825 stranded Afghan visa holders to leave Afghanistan. During the 2021 evacuation from Afghanistan, the Government had granted 1,253 visas to Afghans. However, only 428 had arrived in New Zealand following the Taliban takeover.

On 19 October, the Labour and National parties supported a bipartisan housing bill called the Resource Management (Enabling Housing Supply and Other Matters) Amendment Bill, which aims to build 105,500 new homes over the next eight years. Under the proposed bill, three homes of up to three storeys can be built on most sites without the need for going through the resource consent process. The Government plans to pass the bill by the end of 2021, with local councils to implement it from August 2022. The Bill passed its second reading on 7 December.

On 21 October, the New Zealand and United Kingdom Governments signed a free trade agreement eliminating tariffs on 97% of New Zealand exports to the UK. This free trade agreement is worth NZ$970 million and will eliminate tariffs on all New Zealand exports including honey, wine, kiwifruit, onions, most industrial products. In addition, a range of dairy and beef exports will be tariff free after a period of 15 years.

On 27 October, Local Government Minister Nanaia Mahuta confirmed that the Government would proceed with its "Three Waters reform programme" to take control of the management of storm water, drinking water and wastewater from local councils and territorial bodies. The "Three Waters" reforms would place these water services and assets under the control of four new water entities in order to improve the quality of water utilities and lower the cost of water services. The Government planned to start creating these four new entities in late 2021, which will assume control of water utilities in July 2024. The Government's decision to centralize water utilities and services was criticised by several local councils and mayors including Mayor of Auckland Phil Goff, Mayor of Christchurch Lianne Dalziel, Mayor of Hastings Sandra Hazlehurst, Mayor of the Far North District John Carter, Mayor of Dunedin Aaron Hawkins, and Mayor of Wellington Andy Foster. In addition, the opposition National and ACT parties have vowed to repeal the Three Waters reforms if elected into government. By contrast, Ngāi Tahu's Te Maire Tau, the co-chair of Te Kura Taka Pini (the iwi's freshwater group) welcomed the Three Water reforms, claiming they would improve water services and environmental outcomes.

On 29 October, Ministry for Disability Issues Carmel Sepuloni and Justice Minister Little announced that the Government would establish a new Ministry for Disabled People within the Ministry of Social Development to reform the disability support system and improve outcomes for disabled peoples. In addition, the Government announced a new Accessibility for New Zealanders Bill and the establishment of a new Accessibility Governance Board. The new proposed disability ministry and legislative framework were welcomed Disability Rights Commissioner Paula Tesoriero, Te Ao Mārama chair Tristram Ingham, New Zealand Disability Support Network chief executive Peter Reynolds, and the Green Party's disability spokesperson Jan Logie. Disabled Person Assembly chief executive Prudence Walker welcomed the Government's efforts to prioritise the needs of disabled people but express concerns about funding, disabled leadership, and the limitations of the Accessibility Governance Board.

On 11 November, Justice Minister Kris Faafoi introduced the Three Strikes Legislation Repeal Bill to repeal the Sentencing and Parole Reform Act 2010. While the proposed repeal legislation was supported by the Labour and Green parties, the opposition National and ACT parties defended the "three strikes law." National's justice spokesperson Simon Bridges and ACT's justice spokeswoman Nicole McKee claimed that repealing the "three strikes law" would encourage gangs and violent crime offenders.

On 24 November, Hipkins announced that Indonesia, Fiji, India, Pakistan, and Brazil would be removed from the "Very High-Risk" classification in early December 2021; allowing travellers from these countries to enter New Zealand on the same basis as other international travellers. In addition, Hipkins confirmed that managed isolation and quarantine (MIQ) restrictions would be eased in three stages in 2022. First, all fully vaccinated New Zealanders and other eligible travellers from Australia would be exempt from MIQ from 17 January. Second, all fully vaccinated New Zealanders and other eligible travellers from all other countries would be exempt from MIQ from 14 February. Third, all fully vaccinated travellers would be exempt from MIQ from 30 April.

On 24 November, the Government's COVID-19 Response (Vaccinations) Legislation Act 2021 passed its third reading, allowing businesses to dismiss employees who refuse to be vaccinated against COVID-19. The Bill was opposed by the opposition National, ACT, and Māori parties, which variable criticised the rushed and divisive nature of the legislation and alleged that vulnerable communities would be adversely affected.

On 25 November, the Government announced it would soon release a new Social Security Insurance scheme, labelled the biggest expansion of the welfare state since ACC, which would be funded by a 1–2 percent tax increase.

On 30 November 2021, Minister of Tourism Stuart Nash announced that the Government would be introducing a Self-Contained Vehicles Bill in February 2022 to address the issue of freedom camping. Under the proposed legislation, only self-contained vehicles with fixed toilets will be able to stay on land managed by local councils. Non-self-contained vehicles will be allowed to stay on Department of Conservation–managed land and commercial grounds unless the department has prohibited it. Freedom campers will be allowed to stay in tents overnight where permitted.

On 9 December, Associate Health Minister Ayesha Verrall confirmed that the Government would introduce new legislation under the Smokefree 2025 goal that would ban anyone under the age of 14 from legally purchasing tobacco for the rest of their lives. Older generations will only be permitted to buy tobacco products with very low-levels of nicotine while fewer shops will be allowed to sell tobacco products. The Government's announcement was welcomed by the Green Party and several health leaders including New Zealand Medical Association chair Alistair Humphrey, Health Coalition Aotearoa smokefree expert advisory group chair Sally Liggins, and University of Auckland Associate Dean of Pacific Collin Tukuitonga for addressing the health effects of smoking particularly within the Māori and Pasifika communities. By contrast, ACT health spokesperson Karen Chhour criticised the proposed legislation, stating that prohibition was unworkable and claiming that it would create a black market for tobacco products.

On 15 December, the Resource Management (Enabling Housing Supply and Other Matters) Amendment Act 2021 passed its third and final reading with the bipartisan support of most parties except ACT. This bill intends to make it easier to build houses in major cities in order to address the country's housing shortage.

== 2022 ==
On 16 January 2022 Foreign Minister Mahuta and Ardern announced that New Zealand was making an initial donation of NZ$500,000 to Tonga in response to the 2022 Hunga Tonga–Hunga Ha'apai eruption and tsunami. She also confirmed that the Ministry of Foreign Affairs, New Zealand Defence Force, and other government agencies were working through air and sea options to provide assistance to Tonga. In addition, a Royal New Zealand Air Force (RNZAF) Lockheed P-3 Orion would be sent on a reconnaissance flight as soon as it was safe to do so. On 17 January, the P-63 Orion departed for Tonga following reports of no continued ashfall in the island nation.

On 26 January, Mahuta and Ardern expressed support for Ukrainian sovereignty and urged Russia to deescalate tensions in accordance with international law. Ardern also indicated that New Zealand would consider applying targeted sanctions against Russia in the event of hostilities.

On 26 January, the Government asked suppliers Abbott Laboratories, Roche, and Siemens to give the Government priority in ordering stocks of rapid antigen tests. The Government was criticised by several private companies and representative bodies including the Health Works Group, the Food and Grocery Council, and InScience for allegedly commandeering their orders. In response to criticism, Health Director-General Ashley Bloomfield denied that the Government was requisitioning their orders but was merely asking suppliers to consolidate forward orders of rapid antigen tests. The opposition National and ACT parties accused the Government of requisitioning rapid antigen tests from the private sector to hide its alleged incompetence in obtaining rapid antigent tests.

In late January 2022, Transport Minister Michael Wood announced that the New Zealand Government had approved a NZ$14.6 billion project to establish a partially tunneled light rail network between Auckland Airport and the Auckland CBD. The planned light rail network will integrate with current train and bus hubs as well as the City Rail Link's stations and connections. Transport Minister Michael Wood also added that the Government would decide on plans to establish a second harbour crossing at Waitemata Harbour in 2023. The light rail network was supported by the Green Party but criticised by the ACT party as a waste of taxpayer revenue.

The Government's COVID-19 policies particularly vaccine mandates and lockdowns attracted protests from several anti-vaccination protest groups including Voices for Freedom and Brian Tamaki's The Freedoms and Rights Coalition. This anti-vaccination and anti-lockdown activism culminated in the 2022 Wellington protest between February and early March 2022. Police forcibly removed protesters on 3 March 2022, with the occupation causing significant damage to Parliament's grounds.

On 15 February 2022, the Government's Conversion Practices Prohibition Legislation Act 2022 passed its third and final reading, becoming law with broad cross-party support. The bill's passage was aided by the new National Party leader Christopher Luxon's decision to abandon the Party's bloc vote opposition to the legislation and allow caucus members a conscientious vote.

Following the 2022 Russian invasion of Ukraine, Ardern and Mahuta issued a statement on 24 February condemning Russia's invasion and calling on Russia to withdraw from Ukraine. In addition, New Zealand suspended high-level diplomatic contacts with Russia and introduced travel bans and export controls.

On 1 March, New Zealand and the United Kingdom formally ratified a bilateral free trade agreement announced in October 2021. This agreement eliminates all tariffs on New Zealand exports particularly meat, butter and cheese along with duties on 99.5% of current trade. Ardern described the free trade agreement as a "gold-standard free trade agreement" that would help accelerate the country's economic recovery.

On 7 March, Ardern announced that the Government would be introducing a new Russia Sanctions Act 2022 under urgency to enable autonomous sanctions against in response to its recent invasion of Ukraine. This legislation would allow sanctions to be placed on those responsible for or associated with the Russian invasion of Ukraine including people, services, companies and assets. Key provisions include freezing assets based in New Zealand; preventing people and companies from moving their money and assets to NZ in order to escape foreign sanctions; banning super yachts, ships and aircraft from entering New Zealand waters and airspace, and imposing a travel ban on 100 top Russian officials. Ardern also indicated that this proposed bill would allow sanctions to be imposed on other states complicit with Russian aggression including Belarus. On 9 March, the Russian Sanctions Bill passed with unanimous support from all parties in Parliament.

On 10 March, Broadcasting Minister Kris Faafoi announced plans to merge the two public broadcasters Radio New Zealand (RNZ) and Television New Zealand (TVNZ) into a new public broadcasting service. The new broadcasting entity would have complete editorial independence, operate under a charter, and be funded through a mixture of government funding and commercial revenue. It is expected to launch in July 2023. While the proposed merger was welcomed by RNZ chief executive Paul Thompson and TVNZ chief executive Simon Power, the opposition National Party described it as wasteful and unnecessary.

On 14 March, Ardern announced that the Government would reduce fuel excise taxes and road user charges by 25 cents a litre for the next three months from 11:59 pm that night. In addition, all public transport fares would be halved from 1 April 2022 for the next three months. This announcement was in response to a global energy crisis caused by the Russian invasion of Ukraine. Ardern had initially denied that New Zealand was experiencing a "cost of living crisis" but had since reconsidered her position. Over the past 12 months, the rising cost of living had led New Zealanders to spend an extra NZ$4000 to $5000 on basic commodities such as food, rent and fuel. Customers spent an extra NZ$678 a year on petrol on average.

On 15 March, Ardern announced that the Government would introduce a new two-year work visa programme allowing New Zealand citizens and residents of Ukrainian descent to sponsor Ukrainian family members seeking to shelter in New Zealand. This "Special Ukraine Policy" aims to bring over 4,000 Ukrainians and comes with work and study rights. In addition, the Government contributed another NZ$4 million in humanitarian aid.

On 17 March, the Government launched its "Te Takanga o Te Wā" history curriculum, which emphasizes the teaching of New Zealand history including the contributions of the Māori, Pasifika and Asian communities. The curriculum will be launched in 2023 and will be compulsory in schools up to Year 10.

On 24 March, Immigration Minister Kris Faafoi and Australian Home Affairs Minister Karen Andrews jointly announced that the two governments had reached an agreement for New Zealand to accept 150 refugees a year as part of its annual refugee quota from the Nauru Regional Processing Centre or asylum seekers temporarily in Australia for "processing." Refugees being resettled in New Zealand will have to go through the United Nations High Commissioner for Refugees (UNHCR) process and meet the criteria for NZ's refugee quota requirements. As part of the deal, 450 refugees would be resettled in New Zealand over a three-year period. The Morrison Government had decided to accept a 2012 deal between former New Zealand Prime Minister John Key and Australian Prime Minister Julia Gillard for New Zealand to accept several asylum seekers who had travelled to Australia by sea. Subsequent Australian governments had declined to accept New Zealand's offer due to concerns that it would encourage more asylum seekers to travel by boat to Australia and that former asylum seekers could gain New Zealand citizenship and migrate to Australia.

On 25 March 2022, Ardern and Mahuta joined the Australian Government in expressing concerns about a proposed Solomon Islands security agreement with China, which would allow China to deploy military and security forces in the Solomon Islands and establish a military base there.

On 8 May, Ardern announced that the Government would allocating NZ$23 million from the State Sector Decarbonisation Fund to reduce greenhouse emissions. As part of the investment, NZ$10 million would be spent on replacing coal boilers at 180 New Zealand schools with clean wood burners or electrical heating. In addition, NZ$12.92 million would be spent on other projects including purchasing electrical vehicles, charging infrastructure, and upgrading heating systems at various public facilities including hospitals, police stations, the University of Waikato and Northland Polytechnic.

On 9 May, Police Minister Poto Williams, Corrections Minister Kelvin Davis, and Justice Minister Kris Faafoi announced that the Government would be investing NZ$562 million to combat crime over the next four years. In addition to a package to help businesses deal with ram raids, the Government would allocate NZ$94 million to combating gangs and organised crime; NZ$208 million to new firearms control unit within the New Zealand Police; NZ$164.6 million in operating cash and NZ$20.7 million capital funding to training Police to the standards of the Armed Offenders Squad and recruiting new Police officers; and NZ$$198.3 million to prison rehabilitation programmes and recruiting new Corrections officers.

On 11 May, Ardern announced that New Zealand's border reopening would be accelerated. From 16 May, the border would reopen to Pacific Island visitors. From 4 July, the border would reopen to all work visa holders and a new "green list" would be introduced in order to attract "high-skilled" migrants for "hard to fill positions." In addition, the border would reopen to all visitor and student visa holders as well as cruise ships on 31 July. In addition, streamlined residency pathways would be introduced in September 2022 for migrants in "green list" occupations or who earn twice the median wage. However, new working restrictions would be introduced to international students including limiting working rights to degree-level students with the exception of certain specified occupations, limiting undergraduate working rights to the length of their courses, and preventing students from applying for a second post-study work visa. The Government's decision to exclude nurses, teachers, and dairy farm managers from the visa residency "green list" was also criticised by professional bodies. In early August 2022, the Government acknowledged that it had not consulted professional nursing organisations and the district health boards about its nursing "green list" visa scheme. On 8 August, the Ministry of Business, Innovation and Employment admitted that only nine nurses had applied for the "green list" scheme by late July 2022.

In late May 2022, Ardern led a trade and tourism mission to the United States. During her trip, she urged the Biden administration to join the Comprehensive and Progressive Agreement for Trans-Pacific Partnership (CPTPP) and promoted New Zealand's firearms legislation in response to the Robb Elementary School shooting. On 28 May, Ardern signed a memorandum of understanding with Governor of California Gavin Newsom facilitating bilateral cooperation between New Zealand and California in climate change emissions mitigation and research.

On 2 June, Mahuta introduced the Water Services Entities Bill as the first of several new bills to entrench the Three Waters reform programme into law. The proposed bill would establish the four regional water services entities which would take over management of water infrastructure from the 67 local councils. While councils would retain ownership of their water assets through a "community share" arrangement, the new water service entities would exercise effective control over the water assets. Mahuta also confirmed that further legislation would be introduced to facilitate the transfer of assets and liabilities from local authorities to the Water Services Entities, integrate entities into other regulatory systems, and to ensure economic regulation and consumer protection over the new entities. The opposition National and ACT parties claimed that the proposed bill amounted to the theft of local water assets, bureaucratic centralisation, and would inflame ethnic divisions. Communities 4 Local Democracy leader and Manawatū District Mayor Helen Worboys opposed the bill on the grounds that it would take local community assets without compensation.

On 7 June, the Government's Pae Ora (Healthy Futures) Act 2022 passed its third reading. The bill replaces the country's existing district health boards with a new Crown agency called Health New Zealand and establishes as separate Māori Health Authority. The Health Futures Act also establishes a new Public Health Agency within the Ministry of Health while strengthening the Ministry's stewardship role. It also includes a rural health strategy. While Labour and the Māori Party supported the bill as a means of facilitating health reforms and ensuring Māori co-governance, the opposition National Party questioned the government's proposed reforms while the ACT Party expressed concerns about racial division.

On 13 June, a cabinet reshuffle occurred. Kris Faafoi resigned from Parliament, with his immigration, justice, and broadcasting portfolios being assumed by Michael Wood, Kiri Allan, and Willie Jackson. In addition, Ardern confirmed that Speaker of the House Trevor Mallard would be resigning in mid-August 2022 to assume a diplomatic post in Europe. Adrian Rurawhe was designated as his successor. In addition, Poto Williams stepped down from her Police ministerial portfolio, which was assumed by Chris Hipkins. Priyanca Radhakrishnan was promoted to Cabinet while retaining her community and voluntary sector, ethnic communities, youth, associate social development portfolios and adopting the associate workplace relations portfolios. Former Chief Whip Kieran McAnulty became deputy leader of the House while gaining the associate transport, associate local government, emergency management and racing portfolios. In addition, Ayesha Verrall assumed the COVID-19 response and Research, Science and Innovation ministerial portfolios; Duncan Webb became the new Chief Whip; and Meka Whatiri assumed the food safety portfolio. Labour list MPs Dan Rosewarne and Soraya Peke-Mason replaced the outgoing Faafoi and Mallard.

In mid-June 2022, Broadcasting Minister Willie Jackson introduced draft legislation to formally merge public broadcasters Radio New Zealand and TVNZ into a new non-profit autonomous Crown entity called Aotearoa New Zealand Public Media (ANZPM). The new broadcasting service is expected to come into existence on 1 March 2023. Under the proposed Aotearoa New Zealand Public Media Bill, RNZ and TVNZ would become subsidiaries of the new entity, headed by a single board. ANZPM would be funded through a mixture of commercial and government funding. The new organisation would also operate under a charter outlining goals and responsibilities, with editorial independence being enshrined in its statutory legislation. The Government has also allocated NZ$370m over four years in operating expenditure and $306m in capital funding from the 2022 New Zealand budget for funding the ANZPM.

On 27 June, Ardern confirmed that New Zealand would contribute NZ$4.5 million worth of aid to the NATO Trust Fund including medical kits, fuel, communications equipment, and rations for the Ukrainian Army, bringing the total amount of New Zealand military assistance to Ukraine to $33 million. In addition, the Government dispatched a military officer to support the International Criminal Court's investigation into alleged Russian war crimes. New Zealand also contributed $1 million to the ICC Trust Fund for Victims and the ICC Office of the Prosecutor. In addition, the Government extended the deployment and number of New Zealand military and intelligence personnel assisting NATO forces in the United Kingdom, Belgium, and Germany.

On 30 June, Mahuta and Parker confirmed that New Zealand would support Ukraine's legal challenge at the International Court of Justice (ICJ) contesting Russia's claim that it had invaded Ukraine in response to alleged Ukrainian genocide in the Luhansk and Donetsk regions. This marked the second time that New Zealand had filed a legal challenge at the ICJ in support of another country. In 2012, New Zealand had supported Australia's case against Japanese whaling at the ICJ.

On 11 July, Economic and Regional Development Minister Stuart Nash announced that the Government had loaned NZ$6 million from the Regional Strategic Partnership Fund to help food producer New Zealand Functional Foods build an oat milk factory in Makarewa, Southland. The factory will cost NZ$50 million and is due to be completed in 2023. The oat milk factory is estimated to produce 80 million litres of oat milk and create 50 new jobs. While New Zealand produces oats, the country lacked an oat milk processing facility and was forced to import the product from Australia.

On 13 July, Police Minister Hipkins and Justice Minister Kiri Allan announced that the Government would introduce several new laws to combat criminal gangs including a new criminal offence for firing a gun with intention to intimidate; expanding the range of offences for Police to seize vehicles and financial assets; empowering Police and law enforcement agencies to seize cash over NZ$10,000 found in suspicious circumstances; and expanding Police search and warrant powers to find and confiscate weapons from gang members. Hipkins confirmed that these new offenses would be packaged in a new omnibus amendment bill. In response, the National Party's acting police spokesperson Chris Penk claimed that the Government's measures were insufficient in tackling organised crime and called on the Government to ban gang patches and giving Police the powers to disrupt gangs' communications, ability to organise their activities, and warrantless search powers.

On 19 July, the Government extended the 25-cent fuel tax cut and the half price public transportation subsidy until late January 2023 in a bid to combat rising inflation in New Zealand.

On 27 July, the Government's Smokefree Environments and Regulated Products (Smoked Tobacco) Amendment Bill passed its first reading. The bill proposes reducing the number of retailers allowed to sell tobacco, reducing the amount of nicotine allowed in tobacco products, and banning the sale of tobacco to anyone born on or after 1 January 2009. The bill was supported by most parties with the exception of the libertarian ACT Party. While the National and Green parties supported the legislation, the former voiced concern about the experimental nature of the bill while the latter raised concerns about criminal prohibition pushing the tobacco industry "underground."

On 1 August, the Government launched its "cost of living payment" support programme as part of the 2022 New Zealand Budget. People eligible for these payments include New Zealand tax residents 18 years and above who are earning below NZ$70,000 a year, and who are not entitled to the Winter Energy Payment and are not in prison. Two million people are considered to be eligible for the cost of living payments. The first NZ$116 payment was released on 1 August with the second and third payments following on 1 September and 1 October 2022. The rollout was plagued by reports that overseas-based New Zealanders were receiving payments since the Inland Revenue Department had opted to dispense the payments automatically rather than manually check the eligibility of tax residents. The opposition National Party accused the Government of wasting taxpayer money.

On 1 August, Health Minister Little announced that the Government would be spending NZ$14.4 million to recruit more health workers including doctors, nurses, and radiographers for the country's health workforce. As part of the package, the Government would be providing overseas nurses NZ$10,000 to help cover registration costs. In addition, the Government announced that it would be launching a six-month bridging programme for overseas-trained doctors. Other measures include encouraging retired nurses to return to work, expanding a pilot programme allowing overseas-trained doctors to intern at general practitioners' clinics rather than hospitals, and boosting the number of nurse practitioners and doctors. The Government also confirmed that it would launch a national and international healthcare recruitment campaign in coordination with the TVNZ soap opera series Shortland Street. The new international recruitment service would be housed within the new public health agency Health New Zealand.

On 9 August, the Government's Three Strikes Legislation Repeal Bill passed its third and final reading, repealing the Sentencing and Parole Reform Act 2010. The bill was supported by the Labour, Green, and Māori parties but was opposed by the National and ACT parties. While Justice Minister Kiri Allan and Green MP Elizabeth Kerekere welcomed the repeal of what they described as a punitive law that did little to rehabilitate or reintegrate criminals, the National and ACT parties' justice spokespersons Paul Goldsmith and Nicole McKee claimed the Government was ignoring the crime rate and vowed to reinstate the Sentencing and Parole Reform Act if re-elected in the future.

On 22 August 2022, the New Zealand Government purchased Kiwibank's holdings company Kiwi Group Holdings for an estimated NZ$2.1 billion. As a result, the Government acquired full control of the state-owned bank from the New Zealand Superannuation Fund, ACC, and New Zealand Post.

On 24 August 2022, the Government passed two new laws replacing the Children's Commissioner with the Children and Young People's Commission and splitting oversight of the Oranga Tamariki (Ministry for Children) system between the Independent Children's Monitor and Ombudsman's Office.

On 30 August, Revenue Minister David Parker announced that it would introduce legislation to apply the Goods and Services Tax (GST) to KiwiSaver fees. The Inland Revenue Department estimated that this proposed tax change could generate NZ$226 million in tax revenue from 2026. Following intense public criticism from fund managers and the opposition National Party, the Government abandoned its plans to apply GST taxation on Kiwisaver fees.

Following the death of Queen Elizabeth II, Ardern announced that a one-off public holiday would be held on 26 September to mark the monarch's passing. The holiday would coincide with a state memorial service for Elizabeth at the Wellington Cathedral of St Paul. This holiday is similar to other public holidays held in the United Kingdom on 19 September and Australia on 22 September to mark the Queen's passing. While the Greens and opposition National Party supported the Government's plans for the one-off holiday, the ACT Party and businesses expressed concerns about the adverse economic impact on businesses. On 20 September, Parliament passed urgent legislation creating a once-off public holiday on 26 September. While Labour, National and the Green parties supported the bill, it was opposed by the ACT and Māori parties.

On 12 September, the Government announced that the country's COVID-19 Protection Framework ("traffic light system") would end at 11:59pm that night. As a result, face masks will be eliminated for most public spaces and transportation with the exception of hospitals, clinics, pharmacies, and aged care facilities. In addition, household contacts of COVID-19 positive individuals will not be required to isolate unless they test positive for COVID-19. In addition, vaccine mandates for all travellers entering New Zealand and healthcare workers will end on 13 September and 27 September respectively. COVID-19 antiviral medicines will also be freely provided to COVID-19 positive individuals aged 65 years and above as well as Māori and Pasifika COVID-19 positive individuals aged 50 years and above.

On 28 September, the Government passed the Animal Welfare Amendment Act 2022 which would ban live animal exports from April 2023. The bill was supported by the Labour and Green parties but was opposed by the opposition National and ACT parties. The Government's ban on live animal exports was motivated by the Gulf Livestock 1 disaster in September 2020.

On 11 October, Ardern announced plans to tax the emissions produced by farm animals by 2025. Agricultural emissions by farm animals including burping and urination account for about half of New Zealand's emissions. The Government's proposal was criticised by Federated Farmers national president Andrew Hoggard, who said it would hurt the farming sector by discouraging farmers from making a living. Greenpeace Aotearoa New Zealand's lead climate campaigner Christine Rose claimed the Government's proposed tax on agricultural emissions was insufficient and favoured dairy producers over beef and sheep farmers and Māori landowners.

On 21 October, Transport Minister Michael Wood announced that the Government would launch a NZ$1.3 billion national payment system for all bus, train and ferry fares called the National Ticketing Solution. Waka Kotahi (the New Zealand Transport Agency) and several urban and regional councils had signed contracts with the public transport company Cubic Corporation. The national payment system would be gradually rolled out across the country and would replace existing municipal and regional payment systems including the Bee Card.

On 25 October, the Government's Fair Pay Agreements Act 2022 passed its third reading in Parliament. The bill allows employers and employees to collectively bargain at an industry-wide level. While the bill was supported by the Labour, Green and Māori parties, it was opposed by the National and ACT parties which vowed to repeal it if elected into government at the next general election.

On 4 November 2022, the Government introduced the Arms Act Amendment Bill to stop gun licenses from expiring until Police were able to resolve a backlog of renewing firearms licenses. At the time, there were 12,000 people on the waitlist for a new firearms license. Of this figure, half had been on the waitlist for six months or longer, 1569 had been waiting for at least a year, and 72 have been waiting for two years or more.

In mid November 2022, the Government introduced two new bills, the Natural and Built Environment Act 2023 (NBA) and the Spatial Planning Act 2023 (SPA), as part of its efforts to replace the Resource Management Act 1991 (RMA). The NBA replaces the Government's environmental policy statements with a National Planning Framework (NPF). Under the NPF framework, all 15 regions will be required to develop a Natural and Built Environment Plan (NBE) that will replace the 100 district and regional plans, harmonising consenting and planning rules. An independent national Māori entity will also be established to provide input into the NPF and ensure compliance with the Treaty of Waitangi's provisions. The SSPA will deal with long-term planning. Local committees will be required to develop 30-year regional spatial strategies (RSS) for regional NBEs. In response, the opposition National and ACT parties criticised the Government's proposed overhaul of the RMA legislation on the grounds that it created more centralisation, bureaucracy, and did little to reform the problems associated with the RMA process. The Green Party expressed concerns about what it perceived as the lack of environment protection in the two bills.

On 25 November, the Government and the Māori iwi/tribe Ngāti Mutunga o Wharekauri concluded an "agreement in principle" to settle historical Treaty of Waitangi claims relating to the annexation of the Chatham Islands in 1842. The agreements includes a financial redress of NZ$13 million, the option to transfer culturally significant lands to the iwi as "cultural redress," and shared redress between the iwi and Moriori.

In response to the Murder of Janak Patel, Ardern and Hipkins announced that the Government would be launching a new retail crime package to combat retail crime including a fog cannon subsidy scheme, a NZ$4 million fund to support local councils' crime prevention programmes, and expanding the existing Retail Crime Prevention Fund eligibility to include aggravated robberies.

On 5 December, Ardern and Verrall formally announced that the Government would be holding a royal commission of inquiry into its COVID-19 pandemic response. The inquiry will be chaired by Australian-based epidemiologist Tony Blakely, former National Party cabinet minister Hekia Parata, and former Treasury secretary John Whitehead. The inquiry is expected to be launched on 1 February 2023 and finish in mid-2024. It will examine the overall pandemic response including the health response, border management, community care, isolation, quarantine, and the economic response including monetary policy. However, it will not examine decisions made by the Reserve Bank of New Zealand's Monetary Policy Committee as well as how government policies applied to individual cases. While epidemiologist Michael Baker welcomed the inquiry as a means of preparing for future pandemics, the Green and National parties regarded the inquiry's scope as too narrow and called for a separate review into its economic impact.

On 7 December 2022, the Government's Water Services Entities Act 2022 passed its third and final reading with the sole support of the Labour Party. While National and ACT opposed the Bill on the grounds it promoted co-governance and centralisation, the Greens and Māori parties rejected the Bill due to its lack of anti-privatisation safeguards and alleged "insufficient" co-governance arrangements.

On 12 December 2022, Ardern and Immigration Minister Michael Wood confirmed that the Government would add nurses and midwives to its immigration green list, making them eligible for immediate residency in New Zealand. In addition, the Government established a temporary residence immigration pathway for bus and truck drivers. Teachers and tradespeople including drain layers and motor mechanics were also added to the work to residence immigration pathway. These changes came in response to a national labour shortage across different sectors in the New Zealand economy caused by emigration and low wages. The Government also confirmed plans to add ten jobs to the green list in March 2023 including gas fitters, drain layers, crane operators, civil machine operators, telecommunication technicians, civil construction supervisors, and halal slaughterers.

On 13 December, the Government's Smokefree Environments and Regulated Products (Smoked Tobacco) Amendment Act 2022 passed its third reading by a margin of 76 to 43 votes. While Labour, the Green, and Māori parties voted in favour of the Bill, it was opposed by the National and ACT parties. Associate-Health Minister Verrall argued that the legislation would help reduce tobacco harm among young people and the Māori community while National health spokesperson Reti and ACT Deputy leader Van Velden questioned the effectiveness of the legislation and argued it would cause more harm and crime in the community.

== 2023 ==
On 13 January, the Emergency Management Minister Kieran McAnulty and Rural Communities Minister Damien O'Connor confirmed that the Government had contributed relief assistance to farmers and communities in the Gisborne District/Tairāwhiti affected by flood damage caused by Cyclone Hale. The Government contributed NZ$150,000 to the Mayoral Relief Fund to help communities in the Gisborne District and another NZ$100,000 to help local farmers and horticulturalists affected by Cyclone Hale.

On 19 January, Ardern confirmed that she would be resigning as Prime Minister and leader of the Labour Party prior to the 2023 New Zealand general election, scheduled for 14 October 2023. She also confirmed that she would be stepping down as MP for the Mount Albert electorate. Following Ardern's resignation, Chris Hipkins was elected unopposed as the leader of the Labour Party on 21 January. On 22 January, Carmel Sepuloni succeeded Grant Robertson as Deputy Prime Minister. On 25 January, Hipkins and Sepuloni were formally sworn in as Prime Minister and Deputy Prime Minister respectively.

After assuming office, Hipkins announced that the Labour Government would focus on "cost of living" issues such as rising rent, food prices, and building as the "heart of its work program." Hipkins also stated that the COVID-19 pandemic had created an economic crisis, which his Government would focus on. In late January, Hipkins attended a roundtable event organised by the Auckland Business Chamber where he met with Auckland business leaders to discuss issues affecting the business sector including skills shortages, immigration visa settings, wage rises, and dissatisfaction with the Government's Aotearoa New Zealand Public Media merger, Three Waters reform programme, and the social unemployment insurance scheme.

Following the 2023 Auckland Anniversary Weekend floods which devastated Auckland, Hipkins along with Emergency Management Minister McAnulty and Transport Minister Michael Wood visited Auckland to assess the damage, liaise with local authorities and emergency services, reassure affected constituents, and attended a press conference with Mayor of Auckland Wayne Brown. The Government also pledged NZ$100,000 to aid flood relief efforts in Auckland. On 31 January, the Government committed a further NZ$1 million to the Mayoral Relief Fund to assist affected communities in Auckland.

A cabinet reshuffle occurred on 31 January. Andrew Little was replaced as Health Minister by Ayesha Verrall while Michael Wood was assigned the new Minister of Auckland portfolio in response to the 2023 North Island floods. Kieran McAnulty succeeded Nanaia Mahuta as Minister of Local Government. Mahuta herself retained her Foreign Minister portfolio. Jan Tinetti was also appointed as Education Minister and gained the child poverty reduction. Ginny Andersen and Barbara Edmonds also joined Hipkins' Cabinet. Andersen assumed the "Digital Economy and Communications, Small Business, and Seniors ministerial portfolios as well as the immigration and Treaty of Waitangi Negotiations associate portfolios. Edmonds assumed the Internal Affairs and Pacific Peoples ministerial portfolio as well as health and housing associate portfolios.

On 1 February, Hipkins announced that the Government would spend $718 million in various "cost of living" support measures including extending the 25 cents per litre fuel excise subsidy until 30 June and half-price public transport fares until June 2023. In addition, discounted fares for 1 million Community Service Card holders and tertiary students would be made permanent from 1 July 2023. These subsidies were intended to address the high national cost of living and the effects of the 2023 Auckland Anniversary Weekend floods.

On 7 February, Hipkins undertook his first overseas state visit to Canberra where he met Australian Prime Minister Anthony Albanese. While the two leaders reaffirmed Australian-New Zealand bilateral relations, they also discussed the controversial Section 501 deportation policy. During the visit, Albanese reiterated that his government would revise the deportation policy to take into account individuals' connections to Australia and the length of time they had lived in the country. In response to the 2023 Turkey–Syria earthquake, Foreign Minister Mahuta announced that New Zealand would be contributing NZ$1.5 million to assisting the International Red Cross and Red Crescent Movement (IFRC) responses in Turkey and Syria. Hipkins also confirmed that New Zealand would be providing humanitarian assistance to those affected by the earthquake.

On 8 February, Hipkins announced that several policies including the proposed TVNZ–Radio New Zealand merger and that a biofuel mandate requiring petrol and diesel to source a certain percentage of biofuel from renewable resources would be scrapped. In addition, Hipkins confirmed that other policies including the social income insurance scheme, proposed hate speech legislation, and the controversial Three Waters reform programme would be delayed or revised. Hipkins also confirmed that the minimum wage would be raised from NZ$21.20 to NZ$22.70 an hour from 1 April 2023. In response to the recent North Island floods, Hipkins conformed that the Government would invest NZ$3 million in discretionary flood recovery payments, NZ$1 million in supporting flood-affected businesses, and NZ$1 million in mental health support.

On 13 February, Hipkins announced a NZ$11.5m aid package in response to storm damage caused by Cyclone Gabrielle. The following day, the Minister of Emergency Management McAnulty declared a national state of emergency over the Northland, Auckland, Tairawhiti, Bay of Plenty, Waikato and Hawke's Bay regions; the third time a state of emergency had been declared over the country. This state of emergency allows for a national coordination of the clean-up response, provide additional resources to affected individuals, and empowers the Government to respond to dangerous situations including restricting travel.

On 23 February, the Government ordered a ministerial inquiry into forestry companies' slash practices particularly the stockpiling of discarded branches and "offcuts," which had exacerbated flood damage caused by Cyclone Gabrielle. The inquiry will be led by former National Party cabinet minister Hekia Parata, former Hawke's Bay Regional Council chief executive Bill Bayfield, and forestry engineer Matthew McCloy. Several political and civil society leaders including National Party leader Luxon, the Forest Owners Association President Don Carson, Green Party co-leader Shaw and fellow Green MP Eugenie Sage, and Forestry Minister Stuart Nash supported calls for an inquiry into the forestry industry's practices and accountability from forestry companies.

On 13 March, Hipkins announced that the Government would be scrapping several policies and reform programmes including legislation to lower the voting age to 16 years, the speed reduction programme except for the most dangerous 1% of highways, and the NZ$586 million Clean Car Upgrade programme. In addition, the Government announced that it would delay or scale-back several policies and programmes including proposed alcohol reforms, the container return scheme, public transportation including the Auckland Light Rail, and public consultation on a new test to determine the difference between contractors and employees. The Government would redirect funding to a NZ$2 billion to a welfare package to provide "bread and butter" support to 1.4 million New Zealanders affected by the ongoing "cost of living" crisis. In response, Green Party co-leader and Climate Change Minister James Shaw expressed disappointment with cutbacks of climate action policies such as the Clean Car Upgrade during the so-called "policy bonfire." Meanwhile, Māori Party leader Debbie Ngarewa-Packer expressed concerned with the Government's abandonment of several climate change policies and urged Shaw to resign as Climate Change Minister. The opposition National Party leader Christopher Luxon and deputy leader Nicola Willis welcomed the Government's decision to scrap so-called "wasteful" and "unpopular" policies but urged the Government to reduce spending and taxation. ACT Party leader David Seymour argued that New Zealanders needed a change in government and stated "that Hipkins U-turning on a tiny handful of policies isn't fooling anyone."

In mid March 2023, the Government signed a cooperation agreement with Amazon Web Services to build large data centres in New Zealand. These data service centres will provide cloud storage services for government departments, local councils, schools, tertiary education providers, and other public service bodies. New Zealand currently does not have cloud storage facilities, with Australia providing the infrastructure and services.

On 13 April 2023, the Government announced a major overhaul of its Three Waters reform programme, renaming it the Water Services Reform Programme. The proposed four water services entities were expanded into ten entities but will retain the same split co-governance structure consisting of representatives of local councils and mana whenua representatives.

On 17 April, Hipkins and Education Minister Jan Tinetti announced plans to reduce class sizes for Years 4 to 8 pupils from 29 to 28 by the start of 2025. The Government also confirmed plans to increase the number of teachers by 320. This policy received mixed responses from several principals including Lakeview School principal Tim Nelson, Rangikura School principal Eddie Uluilelata, Konini School deputy principal Khali Olivera, Te Kōmanawa Rowley School principal Graeme Norman, and Alwyn Poole of Innovative Education Consultants, who described it as insufficient and advocated smaller class sizes.

On 4 May, Verrall launched the Government's 2023 Winter Health Plan with the national health service Te Whatu Ora playing a leading role. The Winter Health Plan consisted of 24 initiatives aimed at supporting community care and reducing hospital demand including telehealth services, remote patient monitoring, equipping pharmacies to treat minor ailments, community radiology services, improving access to allied health and community response services, investing in mental health services, bivalent COVID-19 boosters, and influenza vaccination campaigns, and recruiting international nurses and health professionals.

On 14 May, Hipkins, Robertson, Wood, and Verrall announced that the Government would be allocating NZ$941 million from the 2023 New Zealand budget to addressing flood and cyclone damage caused by the 2023 Auckland Anniversary Weekend floods and Cyclone Gabrielle in the North Island. Of this sum, NZ$275 million would be allocated to Waka Kotahi and local councils to repairing damaged roads, NZ$200 million to repairing railways, NZ$117 million to repairing damaged schools, and NZ$35 million to covering various health services including mental health, general practitioners and frontline health workers. The Government's flood and cyclone rescue package was welcomed by local government and health leaders including Mayor of Wairoa Craig Little, Kerry Henderson of Napier Family Centre, and Hawke's Bay Regional Council chair Hinewai Ormsby. While the National Party's cyclone recovery spokesperson Chris Penk praised the investment in infrastructure, he expressed concerned about what he regarded as insufficient support for the horticulture sector.

On 6 June, Health Minister Verrall announced that the Government would be introducing new rules to clamp down on vaping among youths. These rules include prohibiting the sale of disposable vapes from November 2023, reusable vapes from March 2024, child safety mechanisms, banning certain flavour names such as "cotton candy" and "strawberry jelly donut," and banning the establishment of new vape shops 300 metres of a school or marae.

On 27 June, Tinetti and Robertson announced that the Government would be investing NZ$128 million to increase tuition subsidies at degree level and above by a further four percent between 2024 and 2025 for all tertiary institutions including universities, wānanga and the mega polytechnic Te Pūkenga. This funding injection came in response to several tertiary institutions including the University of Otago and Victoria University of Wellington announcing staff and subject cuts in response to financial difficulties. While Universities New Zealand chief executive Chris Whelan welcomed the funding injection, he said that it would not resolve all of the financial troubles that universities in New Zealand were facing.

On 17 July, Hipkins announced the Government's youth justice policy which included introducing a new measure to punish adults convicted of influencing young people to commit crimes and making the publishing of recordings of criminal behaviour on social media an aggravating factor in sentencing. These legislative changes will not be implemented prior to the 2023 general election. That same day, Labour campaigned on introducing several new youth crime policies including building two "high-needs units" within youth justice residences in Auckland and Christchurch, improving safety and security at existing youth justice residences, focusing on crime prevention measures including family group conferences, and empowering Family Courts to require youth offenders to perform community service including cleaning graffiti and rubbish disposal. On 10 July, Hipkins announced that the Government would introduce legislation to make ram-raiding a criminal offence with a ten-year sentence and allowing 12 and 13-year old ram raiders to be tried in Youth Courts.

On 31 July, Cyclone Recovery Minister Robertson proposed a cyclone recovery cost-sharing agreement with the Hawke's Bay Regional Council, Napier City Council, Hastings District Council, Wairoa District Council and Central Hawke's Bay District. This plan includes voluntary property buyouts, flood protection, and transport infrastructure repairs. In response, the five local councils announced that they would convene several extraordinary meetings to consider the Government's cost-sharing offer. On 3 August, the five councils voted to accept the Government's NZ$556 million recovery cost-sharing package, which will be split evenly between the Government and local councils. The package consists of NZ$92.5 million for category 3 property buyouts in Hawke's Bay, NZ$203.5 million towards flood protection for category 2 areas between Wairoa and Pōrangahau, and NZ$260 million for repairing roads and bridges. The Human Rights Commission's Chief Commissioner Paul Hunt criticised the lack of public consultation in the Government's cyclone recovery cost-sharing agreement.

On 8 August, the Government entered into an agreement with US investment company BlackRock to set up a NZ$2 billion investment fund to help reach the Government's target of 100 percent renewable energy by 2030. The BlackRock investment fund will support solar, wind, green hydrogen, battery storage, and EV charging.

On 16 August 2023, the Water Services Entities Amendment Act 2023 passed its third reading. The bill increased the number of water services entities from four to ten, setting 2026 as their inauguration date. That same day, the Government passed the Natural and Built Environment Act 2023 and the Spatial Planning Act 2023, the first two laws in its planned overhaul of the Resource Management Act 1991.

On 17 August, the Government unveiled a ten-year transport plan proposing that NZ$20 billion of funding on 14 new key roads and public transport links for public consultation. On 18 August, Agricultural Minister Damien O'Connor announced a NZ$370 million plan to help farmers reduce carbon emissions over a five-year period.

On 23 August, the Government passed two final bills entrenching the Water Services Reform Programme: the Water Services Economic Efficiency and Consumer Protection Act 2023 and Water Services Legislation Act 2023. The first bill sets up an economic regulation regime overseen by the Commerce Commission as a watchdog over the water services entities' quality and efficiency, and mandates information disclosures. The second bill outlines the duties, functions, and powers of the new water services entities that would come into effect in 2026. National and ACT have opposed the water services reform programme and vowed to repeal them if elected into government following the 2023 New Zealand general election.

On 29 August, the Government introduced a new bill, the Ram Raid Offending and Related Measures Amendment Bill, which adds "smash and grab" offenses to the Crimes Act 1961 and empower Police to prosecute juvenile ram raiders including 12 year olds. The bill seeks to address a recent rise in retail crimes including ram-raiding. While the bill was supported by the Labour, National and ACT parties, it was opposed by the Green and Māori parties.

On 6 October, Minister of Conservation Willow-Jean Prime and Minister of Oceans and Fisheries Rachel Brooking announced that the Government would create six new marine reserves between Timaru and the Catlins in the lower South Island.

In the 2023 New Zealand general election held on 14 October, the Labour Party lost its place as the largest party in parliament to the National Party. In final results, Labour gained 26.91% of the popular vote and its share of parliamentary seats dropped from 64 to 34. Hipkins conceded the election to National Party leader Christopher Luxon. The Labour Government remained in a caretaker capacity until the release of final results on 3 November 2023.

On 17 October, the Government contributed NZ$5 million to the International Committee of the Red Cross's (ICRC) and the United Nations' World Food Programme's humanitarian relief efforts in response to the Gaza war. On 25 October Carolyn Schwalger, New Zealand's Permanent Representative to the United Nations, delivered a statement from Hipkins to the United Nations Security Council calling for a "humanitarian pause" to allow Gazan civilians to receive aid and for the creation of safe zones for civilians during the Gaza war. Hipkins authored the statement in consultation with incoming Prime Minister Luxon. On 28 October, New Zealand voted in favour of United Nations General Assembly Resolution ES-10/21.

In early November 2023, Deputy Prime Minister Sepuloni along with the National Party's foreign affairs spokesperson Gerry Brownlee represented New Zealand at the 2023 Pacific Islands Forum. While Sepuloni attended a leaders' retreat in Aitutaki, Brownlee held meetings with several non-Pacific representatives from Cuba, Portugal, France and South Korea in Rarotonga. On 10 November, Hipkins and Luxon agreed to advise Governor-General Cindy Kiro to prolong the caretaker government arrangement until the conclusion of coalition talks for the incoming National-led government. While Hipkins continued to serve as caretaker Prime Minister, other ministers except Nanaia Mahuta continued to serve in their portfolios. Grant Robertson assumed Mahuta's foreign affairs portfolio while Willie Jackson assumed the associate Māori development portfolio.conclusion of government-formation negotiations between National and its coalition partners Act and New Zealand First.

In mid-November 2023, outgoing Trade Minister Damien O'Connor represented New Zealand at the 2023 APEC summit since incoming Prime Minister Luxon was unable to participate due to coalition negotiations with ACT and NZ First. By 18 November, Hipkins confirmed that the Government had sent a total of NZ$10 million to support humanitarian activities by the International Committee of the Red Cross and World Food Programme in Israel and the Palestinian Territories in response to the Israel-Hamas war.

Following the conclusion of coalition negotiations between National, ACT and New Zealand First on 24 November, the new National-led coalition government was sworn into office on 27 November.
