= List of acts of the 52nd New Zealand Parliament =

This is a list of statutes of New Zealand for the 52nd New Zealand Parliament (7 November 2017 to 6 September 2020), the first parliament of the Sixth Labour Government of New Zealand (2017–2023).

== 2017 ==
Short title	Number	Date of Royal Assent	Notes
Films, Videos, and Publications Classification (Interim Restriction Orders) Amendment Act 2017	2017/43	4 December 2017	Member's bill
Private International Law (Choice of Law in Tort) Act 2017	2017/44	4 December 2017	Member's bill
Parental Leave and Employment Protection Amendment Act 2017	2017/45	4 December 2017	
Healthy Homes Guarantee Act 2017	2017/46	4 December 2017	
Subordinate Legislation Confirmation Act 2017	2017/47	4 December 2017	
Maritime Transport Amendment Act 2017	2017/48	15 December 2017	
Maritime Crimes Amendment Act 2017	2017/49	15 December 2017	
Electronic Interactions Reform Act 2017	2017/50	15 December 2017	
Families Package (Income Tax and Benefits) Act 2017	2017/51	20 December 2017	
Christ Church Cathedral Reinstatement Act 2017	2017/52	21 December 2017	

== 2018 ==
Short title	Number	Date of Royal Assent	Notes
Rates Rebate (Retirement Village Residents) Amendment Act 2018	2018/01	2 February 2018	Member's bill
Dairy Industry Restructuring Amendment Act 2018	2018/02	19 February 2018	
Food Safety Law Reform Act 2018	2018/03	1 March 2018	
Customs and Excise Act 2018	2018/04	29 March 2018	
Taxation (Annual Rates for 2017–18, Employment and Investment Income, and Remedial Matters) Act 2018	2018/05	29 March 2018	
Education (Tertiary Education and Other Matters) Amendment Act 2018	2018/06	29 March 2018	
Criminal Records (Expungement of Convictions for Historical Homosexual Offences) Act 2018	2018/07	9 April 2018	
Appropriation (2016/17 Confirmation and Validation) Act 2018	2018/08	7 May 2018	
Brokering (Weapons and Related Items) Controls Act 2018	2018/09	21 May 2018	
Families Commission Act Repeal Act 2018	2018/10	28 May 2018	
Subordinate Legislation Confirmation Act 2018	2018/11	19 June 2018	
Appropriation (2017/18 Supplementary Estimates) Act 2018	2018/12	26 June 2018	
Imprest Supply (First for 2018/19) Act 2018	2018/13	26 June 2018	
Heretaunga Tamatea Claims Settlement Act 2018	2018/14	26 June 2018	
Land Transport Management (Regional Fuel Tax) Amendment Act 2018	2018/15	26 June 2018	
Taxation (Neutralising Base Erosion and Profit Shifting) Act 2018	2018/16	27 June 2018	
Friendly Societies and Credit Unions (Regulatory Improvements) Amendment Act 2018	2018/17	4 July 2018	Member's bill
Ngāi Tai ki Tāmaki Claims Settlement Act 2018	2018/18	4 July 2018	
Ngāti Tamaoho Claims Settlement Act 2018	2018/19	10 July 2018	
Exclusive Economic Zone and Continental Shelf (Environmental Effects) Amendment Act 2018	2018/20	10 July 2018	
Domestic Violence—Victims' Protection Act 2018	2018/21	30 July 2018	Member's bill
Minors (Court Consent to Relationships) Legislation Act 2018	2018/22	13 August 2018	Member's bill
Appropriation (2018/19 Estimates) Act 2018	2018/23	20 August 2018	
Imprest Supply (Second for 2018/19) Act 2018	2018/24	20 August 2018	
Overseas Investment Amendment Act 2018	2018/25	22 August 2018	
National Animal Identification and Tracing Amendment Act 2018	2018/26	22 August 2018	
Statutes Amendment Act 2018	2018/27	7 September 2018	
Iwi and Hapū of Te Rohe o Te Wairoa Claims Settlement Act 2018	2018/28	13 September 2018	
Tariff (PACER Plus) Amendment Act 2018	2018/29	13 September 2018	
America's Cup Road Stopping Act 2018	2018/30	13 September 2018	
State Sector and Crown Entities Reform Act 2018	2018/31	21 September 2018	
Social Security Act 2018	2018/32	28 September 2018	
Residential Care and Disability Support Services Act 2018	2018/33	28 September 2018	
Artificial Limb Service Act 2018	2018/34	28 September 2018	
Education (Teaching Council of Aotearoa New Zealand) Amendment Act 2018	2018/35	28 September 2018	
Military Justice Legislation Amendment Act 2018	2018/36	28 September 2018	
Remuneration Authority (Members of Parliament Remuneration) Amendment Act 2018	2018/37	28 September 2018	
Maritime Powers Extension Act 2018	2018/38	28 September 2018	
Electoral (Integrity) Amendment Act 2018	2018/39	3 October 2018	
Education Amendment Act 2018	2018/40	23 October 2018	
Trans-Pacific Partnership Agreement (CPTPP) Amendment Act 2018	2018/41	25 October 2018	
Commerce Amendment Act 2018	2018/42	25 October 2018	
Education (National Education and Learning Priorities) Amendment Act 2018	2018/43	6 November 2018	
Residential Tenancies (Prohibiting Letting Fees) Amendment Act 2018	2018/44	6 November 2018	
Social Assistance (Residency Qualification) Legislation Act 2018	2018/45	12 November 2018	
Family Violence Act 2018	2018/46	12 November 2018	
Family Violence (Amendments) Act 2018	2018/47	12 November 2018	
Telecommunications (New Regulatory Framework) Amendment Act 2018	2018/48	12 November 2018	
Crown Minerals (Petroleum) Amendment Act 2018	2018/49	12 November 2018	
Courts Matters Act 2018	2018/50	13 November 2018	
Tribunals Powers and Procedures Legislation Act 2018	2018/51	13 November 2018	
Consumers’ Right to Know (Country of Origin of Food) Act 2018	2018/52	3 December 2018	
Employment Relations Amendment Act 2018	2018/53	11 December 2018	
Misuse of Drugs (Medicinal Cannabis) Amendment Act 2018	2018/54	17 December 2018	
Ngāti Tūwharetoa Claims Settlement Act 2018	2018/55	18 December 2018	
Subordinate Legislation Confirmation Act (No 2) 2018	2018/56	18 December 2018	
Child Poverty Reduction Act 2018	2018/57	20 December 2018	
Children's Amendment Act 2018	2018/58	20 December 2018	
Reserve Bank of New Zealand (Monetary Policy) Amendment Act 2018	2018/59	20 December 2018	
Coroners (Access to Body of Dead Person) Amendment Act 2018	2018/60	20 December 2018	
Conservation (Infringement System) Act 2018	2018/61	20 December 2018	
Tasman District Council (Waimea Water Augmentation Scheme) Act 2018	Local Act 2018/1	18 December 2018	Local Act
New Plymouth District Council (Waitara Lands) Act 2018	Local Act 2018/2	18 December 2018	Local Act

== 2019 ==
Short title	Number	Date of Royal Assent	Notes
Earthquake Commission Amendment Act 2019	2019/1	18 February 2019	
Crown Minerals Amendment Act 2019	2019/2	18 February 2019	
Social Workers Registration Legislation Act 2019	2019/3	27 February 2019	
Crimes Amendment Act 2019	2019/4	11 March 2019	
Taxation (Annual Rates for 2018–19, Modernising Tax Administration, and Remedial Matters) Act 2019	2019/5	18 March 2019	
Local Government Regulatory Systems Amendment Act 2019	2019/6	20 March 2019	
Local Electoral Matters Act 2019	2019/7	8 April 2019	
Financial Services Legislation Amendment Act 2019	2019/8	8 April 2019	
Commerce (Criminalisation of Cartels) Amendment Act 2019	2019/9	8 April 2019	
Accident Compensation Amendment Act 2019	2019/10	11 April 2019	
Health Practitioners Competence Assurance Amendment Act 2019	2019/11	11 April 2019	
Arms (Prohibited Firearms, Magazines, and Parts) Amendment Act 2019	2019/12	11 April 2019	
Social Security (Winter Energy Payment) Amendment Act 2019	2019/13	11 April 2019	
Arbitration Amendment Act 2019	2019/14	7 May 2019	
Taxation (Research and Development Tax Credits) Act 2019	2019/15	7 May 2019	
Fire and Emergency New Zealand (Levy) Amendment Act 2019	2019/16	7 May 2019	
Local Government (Community Well-being) Amendment Act 2019	2019/17	13 May 2019	
Education Amendment Act 2019	2019/18	13 May 2019	
Gore District Council (Otama Rural Water Supply) Act 2019	Local Act 2019/1	27 May 2019	Local Act
Ngā Rohe Moana o Ngā Hapū o Ngāti Porou Act 2019	2019/19	29 May 2019	
Appropriation (2017/18 Confirmation and Validation) Act 2019	2019/20	31 May 2019	
Canterbury Earthquakes Insurance Tribunal Act 2019	2019/21	31 May 2019	
Excise and Excise-equivalent Duties Table (Budget Measures—Motor Spirits) Amendment Act 2019	2019/22	5 June 2019	
Social Assistance Legislation (Budget 2019 Welfare Package) Amendment Act 2019	2019/23	5 June 2019	
Immigration (International Visitor Conservation and Tourism Levy) Amendment Act 2019	2019/24	5 June 2019	
New Zealand Business Number Funding (Validation and Authorisation) Act 2019	2019/25	5 June 2019	
District Court (District Court Judges) Amendment Act 2019	2019/26	5 June 2019	
Building Amendment Act 2019	2019/27	17 June 2019	
Insolvency Practitioners Regulation (Amendments) Act 2019	2019/28	17 June 2019	
Insolvency Practitioners Regulation Act 2019	2019/29	17 June 2019	
Oranga Tamariki Legislation Act 2019	2019/30	19 June 2019	
Veterans' Support Amendment Act 2019	2019/31	24 June 2019	
Racing Reform Act 2019	2019/32	26 June 2019	
Taxation (Annual Rates for 2019–20, GST Offshore Supplier Registration, and Remedial Matters) Act 2019	2019/33	26 June 2019	
Appropriation (2018/19 Supplementary Estimates) Act 2019	2019/34	27 June 2019	
Imprest Supply (First for 2019/20) Act 2019	2019/35	27 June 2019	
Employment Relations (Triangular Employment) Amendment Act 2019	2019/36	27 June 2019	
Residential Tenancies Amendment Act 2019	2019/37	30 July 2019	
Trusts Act 2019	2019/38	30 July 2019	
New Zealand Public Health and Disability (Waikato DHB) Elections Act 2019	2019/39	30 July 2019	
Ngāti Rangi Claims Settlement Act 2019	2019/40	31 July 2019	
Health (Drinking Water) Amendment Act 2019	2019/41	31 July 2019	
Misuse of Drugs Amendment Act 2019	2019/42	12 August 2019	
Copyright (Marrakesh Treaty Implementation) Amendment Act 2019	2019/43	12 August 2019	
Contempt of Court Act 2019	2019/44	26 August 2019	
KiwiSaver (Oranga Tamariki Guardians) Amendment Act 2019	2019/45	26 August 2019	
Financial Markets (Derivatives Margin and Benchmarking) Reform Amendment Act 2019	2019/46	30 August 2019	
Sale and Supply of Alcohol (Rugby World Cup 2019 Extended Trading Hours) Amendment Act 2019	2019/47	30 August 2019	
Appropriation (2019/20 Estimates) Act 2019	2019/48	23 September 2019	
Imprest Supply (Second for 2019/20) Act 2019	2019/49	23 September 2019	
Kāinga Ora – Homes and Communities Act 2019	2019/50	23 September 2019	
New Zealand Infrastructure Commission/Te Waihanga Act 2019	2019/51	25 September 2019	
Education (School Donations) Amendment Act 2019	2019/52	21 October 2019	
Partnership Law Act 2019	2019/53	21 October 2019	
Local Government Act 2002 Amendment Act 2019	2019/54	21 October 2019	
Conservation (Indigenous Freshwater Fish) Amendment Act 2019	2019/55	21 October 2019	
Statutes Amendment Act 2019	2019/56	23 October 2019	
Corrections Amendment Act 2019	2019/57	28 October 2019	
Legislation Act 2019	2019/58	28 October 2019	
Legislation (Repeals and Amendments) Act 2019	2019/59	28 October 2019	
Te Ture Haeata ki Parihaka 2019; Parihaka Reconciliation Act 2019	2019/60	30 October 2019	In Maori and English
Climate Change Response (Zero Carbon) Amendment Act 2019	2019/61	13 November 2019	
Regulatory Systems (Economic Development) Amendment Act 2019	2019/62	13 November 2019	
Regulatory Systems (Workforce) Amendment Act 2019	2019/63	13 November 2019	
Regulatory Systems (Housing) Amendment Act 2019	2019/64	13 November 2019	
Organ Donors and Related Matters Act 2019	2019/65	16 November 2019	
Criminal Cases Review Commission Act 2019	2019/66	16 November 2019	
End of Life Choice Act 2019	2019/67	16 November 2019	Member's Bill
Companies (Clarification of Dividend Rules in Companies) Amendment Act 2019	2019/68	16 November 2019	
Parliamentary Agencies Delegations Legislation Act 2019	2019/69	16 November 2019	
Land Transport (Wheel Clamping) Amendment Act 2019	2019/70	21 November 2019	
Referendums Framework Act 2019	2019/71	6 December 2019	
Electoral Amendment Act 2019	2019/72	6 December 2019	
Farm Debt Mediation Act 2019	2019/73	13 December 2019	
National Animal Identification and Tracing Amendment Act 2019	2019/74	13 December 2019	
Dog Control (Category 1 Offences) Amendment Act 2019	2019/75	13 December 2019	
Venture Capital Fund Act 2019	2019/76	13 December 2019	
New Zealand Superannuation and Retirement Income Amendment Act 2019	2019/77	13 December 2019	
Education (Pastoral Care) Amendment Act 2019	2019/78	19 December 2019	
Terrorism Suppression (Control Orders) Act 2019	2019/79	19 December 2019	
Maritime Transport (Offshore Installations) Amendment Act 2019	2019/80	19 December 2019	
Credit Contracts Legislation Amendment Act 2019	2019/81	19 December 2019	
Subordinate Legislation Confirmation Act 2019	2019/82	19 December 2019	
Remuneration Authority (Members of Parliament Remuneration) Amendment Act 2019	2019/83	19 December 2019	
Te Ture kia Unuhia te Hara kai Runga i a Rua Kēnana 2019; Rua Kēnana Pardon Act 2019	2019/84	21 December 2019	In Maori and English

== 2020 ==
This is a list of acts passed in 2020, before the dissolution of the 52nd Parliament on 6 September 2020. For the later statutes of 2020, see List of acts of the 53rd New Zealand Parliament.

Title	Number	Date of Royal assent	Notes
Education (Vocational Education and Training Reform) Amendment Act 2020	2020/1	24 February 2020	
Education (Vocational Education and Training Reform) Amendment Act 2020	2020/1	24 February 2020	Corrections made under the Legislation Act 2012.
Electoral Amendment Act 2020	2020/2	10 March 2020	
Ombudsmen (Protection of Name) Amendment Act 2020	2020/3	10 March 2020	
Election Access Fund Act 2020	2020/4	16 March 2020	
Taxation (KiwiSaver, Student Loans, and Remedial Matters) Act 2020	2020/5	23 March 2020	
Abortion Legislation Act 2020	2020/6	23 March 2020	
Imprest Supply (Third for 2019/20) Act 2020	2020/7	25 March 2020	
COVID-19 Response (Taxation and Social Assistance Urgent Measures) Act 2020	2020/8	25 March 2020	
COVID-19 Response (Urgent Management Measures) Legislation Act 2020	2020/9	25 March 2020	
COVID-19 Response (Urgent Management Measures) Legislation Act 2020	2020/9	25 March 2020	Corrections made under the Legislation Act 2012.
COVID-19 Response (Taxation and Other Regulatory Urgent Measures) Act 2020	2020/10	30 April 2020	
Appropriation (2018/19 Confirmation and Validation) Act 2020	2020/11	13 May 2020	
COVID-19 Public Health Response Act 2020	2020/12	13 May 2020	
COVID-19 Response (Further Management Measures) Legislation Act 2020	2020/13	15 May 2020	Corrections made under the Legislation Act 2012.
COVID-19 Response (Further Management Measures) Legislation Act 2020	2020/13	15 May 2020	
COVID-19 Response (Requirements For Entities—Modifications and Exemptions) Act 2020	2020/14	15 May 2020	
Immigration (COVID-19 Response) Amendment Act 2020	2020/15	15 May 2020	
Customs and Excise (Tobacco) Amendment Act 2020	2020/16	15 May 2020	
Family Court (Supporting Families in Court) Legislation Act 2020	2020/17	15 May 2020	
Remuneration Authority (COVID-19 Measures) Amendment Act 2020	2020/18	15 May 2020	
Smoke-free Environments (Prohibiting Smoking in Motor Vehicles Carrying Children) Amendment Act 2020	2020/19	28 May 2020	
Social Security (COVID-19 Income Relief Payment to be Income) Amendment Act 2020	2020/20	2 June 2020	
Overseas Investment (Urgent Measures) Amendment Act 2020	2020/21	2 June 2020	
Climate Change Response (Emissions Trading Reform) Amendment Act 2020	2020/22	22 June 2020	
Arms Legislation Act 2020	2020/23	24 June 2020	Corrections made under the Legislation Act 2012.
Arms Legislation Act 2020	2020/23	24 June 2020	
Appropriation (2019/20 Supplementary Estimates) Act 2020	2020/24	29 June 2020	
Imprest Supply (First for 2020/21) Act 2020	2020/25	29 June 2020	
Electoral (Registration of Sentenced Prisoners) Amendment Act 2020	2020/26	29 June 2020	
Greater Christchurch Regeneration Amendment Act 2020	2020/27	29 June 2020	
Racing Industry Act 2020	2020/28	30 June 2020	
Public Finance (Wellbeing) Amendment Act 2020	2020/29	30 June 2020	
Resource Management Amendment Act 2020	2020/30	30 June 2020	
Privacy Act 2020	2020/31	30 June 2020	Corrections made under the Legislation Act 2012.
Privacy Act 2020	2020/31	30 June 2020	
Mental Health and Wellbeing Commission Act 2020	2020/32	30 June 2020	
Land Transport (Rail) Legislation Act 2020	2020/33	30 June 2020	
Electoral (Registration of Sentenced Prisoners) Amendment Act (No 2) 2020	2020/34	1 July 2020	
COVID-19 Recovery (Fast-track Consenting) Act 2020	2020/35	8 July 2020	
New Zealand Superannuation and Veteran’s Pension Legislation Amendment Act 2020	2020/36	24 July 2020	
New Zealand Māori Arts and Crafts Institute Vesting Act 2020	2020/37	24 July 2020	
Education and Training Act 2020	2020/38	31 July 2020	Corrections made under the Legislation Act 2012.
Education and Training Act 2020	2020/38	31 July 2020	
International Crimes and International Criminal Court Amendment Act 2020	2020/39	6 August 2020	
Public Service Act 2020	2020/40	6 August 2020	
Public Service Act 2020	2020/40	6 August 2020	Corrections made under the Legislation Act 2012.
Public Finance Amendment Act 2020	2020/41	6 August 2020	
Urban Development Act 2020	2020/42	6 August 2020	
Forests (Regulation of Log Traders and Forestry Advisers) Amendment Act 2020	2020/43	6 August 2020	
Rates Rebate (Statutory Declarations) Amendment Act 2020	2020/44	6 August 2020	
Equal Pay Amendment Act 2020	2020/45	6 August 2020	
Equal Pay Amendment Act 2020	2020/45	6 August 2020	Corrections made under the Legislation Act 2012.
Dairy Industry Restructuring Amendment Act 2020	2020/46	6 August 2020	
Infrastructure Funding and Financing Act 2020	2020/47	6 August 2020	
Land Transport (NZTA) Legislation Amendment Act 2020	2020/49	6 August 2020	
Land Transport (NZTA) Legislation Amendment Act 2020	2020/49	6 August 2020	Corrections made under the Legislation Act 2012.
Films, Videos, and Publications Classification (Commercial Video on-Demand) Amendment Act 2020	2020/49	6 August 2020	
Films, Videos, and Publications Classification (Commercial Video on-Demand) Amendment Act 2020	2020/49	6 August 2020	Corrections made under the Legislation Act 2012.
Support Workers (Pay Equity) Settlements Amendment Act 2020	2020/50	6 August 2020	
Te Ture Whenua Maori (Succession, Dispute Resolution, and Related Matters) Amendment Act 2020	2020/51	6 August 2020	
Taumata Arowai–the Water Services Regulator Act 2020	2020/52	6 August 2020	Corrections made under the Legislation Act 2012.
Taumata Arowai–the Water Services Regulator Act 2020	2020/52	6 August 2020	
Crimes (Definition of Female Genital Mutilation) Amendment Act 2020	2020/53	6 August 2020	
Veterans’ Support Amendment Act 2020	2020/54	6 August 2020	
Appropriation (2020/21 Estimates) Act 2020	2020/55	6 August 2020	
Imprest Supply (Second for 2020/21) Act 2020	2020/56	6 August 2020	
COVID-19 Public Health Response Amendment Act 2020	2020/57	6 August 2020	
COVID-19 Response (Further Management Measures) Legislation Act (No 2) 2020	2020/58	6 August 2020	
Residential Tenancies Amendment Act 2020	2020/59	11 August 2020	
Fuel Industry Act 2020	2020/60	11 August 2020	
New Zealand Public Health and Disability Amendment Act 2020	2020/61	11 August 2020	
Smokefree Environments and Regulated Products (Vaping) Amendment Act 2020	2020/62	11 August 2020	

== See also ==
- Lists of Statutes of New Zealand
