= Plain Language Act 2022 =

Act of Parliament in New Zealand

New Zealand Parliament
- Royal assent: 21 October 2022

Legislative history
- Introduced by: Rachel Boyack
- First reading: 16 February 2022
- Second reading: 1 September 2022
- Third reading: 19 October 2022
- Status: Current legislation

The Plain Language Act 2022 (2022 No 54) is an Act of Parliament in New Zealand. The Act specifies the requirement of government officials to use plain, easily understood language when communicating with the public. It received royal assent on 21 October 2022.

== Provisions ==
The Plain Language Act 2022 defines "plain language" as language that is appropriate to the intended audience and is "clear, concise, and well organised". It also sets out the criteria for government documents and public information that should use "plain language".

== Legislative history ==
The Bill was first introduced to Parliament on 20 October 2021 by its sponsor Labour Member of Parliament (MP) Rachel Boyack. While Boyack, fellow Labour MPs Glen Bennett, Steph Lewis, Ingrid Leary, Ginny Andersen, and Willow-Jean Prime and Green Party Jan Logie argued that it would improve government communications with the public, the opposition National MPs Chris Bishop, Simeon Brown, and ACT MP James McDowall argued that the legislation was unnecessary and would be a waster of public expenditure. The bill passed its first reading on 15 February 2022 by a margin of 75 to 43 votes along partisan lines. While the Labour and Green parties supported the bill, it was opposed by National and ACT.

The Bill passed its second reading on 31 August 2022 by a margin of 77 to 43 votes. While the Labour, Greens and Te Pāti Māori supported the Bill, it was opposed by National and ACT.

The Bill's in-committee's debate was held on 21 September 2022. During the debate, National MP Judith Collins described the Bill as the "Lackadaisical Language Bill" and questioned whether Boyack had undertaken a study to ensure that the Māori language (Te Reo) had more "plain language" words. Fellow National MP Brown described the Bill as "a solution looking for a problem". Labour MP Naisi Chen defended the Bill, arguing that it would benefit people for whom English was a second language. Boyack defended the use of Te Reo in official documents and explained how the Bill would guide the Public Service's communications. National MPs Michael Woodhouse, Simon Watts and Gerry Brownlee also made speeches criticising the Bill while Labour MPs Jamie Strange and Sarah Pallett gave speeches defending the Bill. A motion to progress the Bill to its third reading passed by a margin of 77 (Labour, Greens, Te Pāti Māori and independent MP Gaurav Sharma) to 43 votes (National and ACT).

The Bill passed its third reading on 19 October 2022 by a margin of 76 to 42. It received royal assent on 21 October.

== Repeal efforts ==
In 2025, the Sixth National Government introduced legislation repealing the Plain Language Act. On 1 April 2025, Public Service Minister Judith Collins's KC repeal bill passed its first reading. Collins claimed that the legislation was unnecessary and stated that it "created a problem whereby plain language officers had to be appointed." In response, disability advocates including disability access consultant Callum McMenamin and Write Group CEO Lynda Harris argued the legislation was necessary in eliminating barriers for people with limited English proficiency, certain disabilities, low literacy or learning difficulties.
