= Electoral (Māori Electoral Option) Legislation Act 2022 =

Act of Parliament in New Zealand

New Zealand Parliament
- Royal assent: 18 November 2022

Legislative history
- Introduced by: Kiri Allan
- First reading: 30 June 2022
- Second reading: 8 November 2022
- Third reading: 16 November 2022

Related legislation
- Electoral Act 1993, Local Electoral Act 2001
- Status: Current legislation

The Electoral (Māori Electoral Option) Legislation Act 2022 is an Act of Parliament passed by the New Zealand Parliament that allows Māori voters to switch between the general and Māori electoral rolls at anytime except during certain pre-election periods: "the three months before polling day for general and local body elections; and, for some Māori voters in an electorate where a parliamentary by-election occurs, in the period leading up to the by-election." The Bill passed its third reading on 16 November 2022 and came into effect on 31 March 2023 prior to the 2023 New Zealand general election.

== Key provisions ==
The Māori Electoral Option Legislation Act amends the Electoral Act 1993 and the Local Electoral Act 2001 to set out the criteria for eligible Māori voters to switch between the general or Māori electoral rolls for general, local, and by-elections:

- For general elections, Māori voters are able to switch rolls at anytime except for the three-month period before polling day.
- For local elections, Māori voters are able to switch rolls at anytime except for the three-month period before polling day.
- For by-elections in parliamentary electorates, Māori voters are unable to switch rolls in the period leading up to the by-election.
- The Electoral Commission must send information to Māori electors about the exercise of the Māori option by 30 April 2023 or 31 March in any other year in which the New Zealand Parliament is due to expire.

== History ==
=== Background ===
In June 2022, the Justice Minister Kris Faafoi of the incumbent Labour Party introduced a bill to allow people of Māori descent to switch between the general and Māori electoral rolls at any time. At the time, Māori were only allowed to switch between the two rolls during a four month period every four to six years. To pass into law, the bill needed 75% majority support in Parliament. In addition, Te Pāti Māori (Māori Party) co-leader Rawiri Waititi introduced a member's bill which proposed automatically placing Māori on the Māori electoral roll and renaming the "general electoral district" the "non-Māori electoral district."

=== Legislative passage ===
The Bill passed its first reading on 30 June 2022 by a margin of 77 to 42 votes. While the Labour, Green and Māori parties supported the Bill, it was opposed by the National and ACT parties. Supporters including Justice Minister Kiri Allan, Labour MP Emily Henderson and Green MP Golriz Ghahraman argued that the Bill would reduce barriers for Māori participation in elections and increase vote participation in New Zealand democracy. By contrast, opponents including National MPs Chris Penk, Michael Woodhouse, Maureen Pugh, and ACT MP Nicole McKee expressed concerns about tactical roll-switching and questioned the necessity of the legislation. Waititi accused National and ACT of attempting to silence the Māori voice in New Zealand politics.

The New Zealand Parliament's justice select committee received 121 submissions, who favoured changing the Māori electoral option's rules to boost Māori participation. Many of the submissions regarded the status quo of allowing Māori voters to switch rolls during a four-month period every five to six years as "very narrow and seemingly arbitrary." Following feedback from the justice select committee, several amendments were made to Māori Electoral Options Bill including one to ensure that the Electoral Commission did not amend the roll at any time between the day after polling day and the day the writ is returned. Following these amendments, the National Party abandoned its opposition to the Bill. The Bill passed its second reading by a margin of 109 to 10. ACT voted against the Bill since they were still dissatisfied with the amendments.

During an in-committee parliamentary meeting held on 15 November 2022, the National and ACT parties agreed to support the Māori Electoral Option bill after the Labour Government agreed to prohibit roll switching during the three month period before general and local elections and found an accepted definition for the "Māori electoral population;" giving the Government the 75% majority need to pass the bill into law. The Greens opposed these supplementary order changes while Te Pāti Māori abstained. Te Pāti Māori co-leaders Waititi and Debbie Ngarewa-Packer criticised the changes, describing them as "second-rate" and a "half pie ka pai" respectively.

The Bill passed its third and final reading on 16 November with the support of all parties in Parliament. Justice Minister Allan said that the Bill would abolish the prior policy of limiting the ability of Māori to switch rolls to a four-month period every five to six years. She also welcomed National and ACT's support for the Bill. National MPs Paul Goldsmith, Mark Mitchell, and ACT MP Karen Chhour thanked the Government for addressing their concerns about the initial version of the legislation and supported the three-month electoral deadline for switching rolls. Despite Te Pāti Māori's support for the Bill, Ngarewa-Packer expressed regret that Parliament had not passed her colleague Waititi's alternative bill that would have allowed Māori voters to switch rolls at any time. Similar sentiments were expressed by Green MP Ghahraman.

=== Implementation ===
The Electoral (Māori Electoral Option) Legislation Act 2022 came into force on 31 March 2023; allowing people of Māori descent to switch between the general and Māori rolls at anytime until the three month period before elections. The Electoral Commission subsequently launched a campaign to encourage non-voters to register with either the general or Māori rolls. For the 2023 New Zealand general election, the cutoff date was set at midnight 13 July 2023.

By 3 July 2023, over 12,000 people had switched between the Māori and general rolls; with 6,662 people shifting from the general to Māori rolls and 5,652 switching vice versa. Political expert and academic Dr Rawiri Taonui and journalist Tommy de Silva described that the increase of voters on the Māori roll as a form of strategic voting that reinforced the relevance of the Māori seats and Māori vote to New Zealand politics.

By 11 July 2025, the Electoral Commission confirmed that almost 31,000 voters had switched to the Māori electoral roll while over 25,000 first time voters had registered with the Māori roll. By contrast, about 20,000 Māori descent voters had switched to the general roll while 17,000 new voters had registered with the general roll. Commission chief Māori advisor Hone Matthews credited the law change with removing a barrier for Māori voters and boosting their electoral engagement.
