= Water Services Entities Act 2022 =

Act of Parliament in New Zealand

New Zealand Parliament
- Royal assent: 14 December 2022

Legislative history
- Introduced by: Nanaia Mahuta
- First reading: 9 June 2022
- Second reading: 16 November 2022
- Third reading: 7 December 2022
- Passed: 7 December 2022
- Status: Repealed

The Water Services Entities Act 2022 is an Act of Parliament in the New Zealand Parliament that creates four new water services entities to assume the water services responsibilities of territorial authorities. The Bill is part of the Sixth Labour Government's Three Waters reform programme. The Bill passed its third reading on 7 December 2022, and received royal assent on 14 December 2022.

On 14 February 2024, the Water Services Entities Act along with Labour's other Three Waters legislation was repealed by the National-led coalition government.

== Key provisions ==
The Water Services Entities Act 2022:

- Establishes four new water services entities that oversee drinking water, wastewater, and stormwater services and infrastructure. These entities are the Northern Water Services Entity, the Western-Central Water Services Entity, the Eastern-Central Water Services Entity, and the Southern Water Services Entity.
- Establishes water services entities as a body corporate and separate legal entity from its board members, employees, the Crown, the entity's regional representative group, any regional advisory panel for that group, and the entity's territorial authority owners.
- Water services entities are co-owned by the territorial authorities in its service area and through shares allocated to each territorial authority owner based on the population of its district or part district.
- Water services entities are governed by a regional representative group consisting of an equal number of territorial authority and mana whenua representatives from the entity's service area. Gives both territorial authorities and mana whenua groups the authority to appoint representatives to the regional representative groups.
- Water services entities operate according to the principles of the Treaty of Waitangi and Te Mana o te Wai, the central concept for freshwater management in the National Policy Statement for Freshwater 2020.
- Entities must engage with consumers and local communities regarding the provision of water services.
- Divestment proposals must receive unanimous support from its territorial authority owners, support from at least 75% of an entity's regional representative group, and support from at least 75% of votes cast by voters within its service area in a poll.
- Water services entities, their boards, and employees are independent of other parties including the Minister of Local Government, territorial authorities, regional representatives, or regional representative groups.

== History ==
=== Background ===
On 2 June, Minister of Local Government Nanaia Mahuta introduced the Water Services Entities Bill as the first of several new bills to entrench the Government's Three Waters reform programme into law. The Bill seeks to establish the four regional water services entities which would take over management of water infrastructure from the 67 local councils. Under the proposed law, councils would retain ownership of their water assets through a "community share" arrangement. However, water services would be managed and controlled by four new water services entities, which would have both community and Māori iwi/tribal representation. Mahuta has stated that Water Services Entities Bill would have safeguards against privatisation.

The Water Services Entities Bill also preceded legislation establishing a national water regulator called Taumata Arowai, which is tasked with establishing stronger standards for drinking water. In addition to the Water Services Entities Bill, Mahuta confirmed that further legislation would be introduced to facilitate the transfer of assets and liabilities from local authorities to the Water Services Entities, integrate entities into other regulatory systems, regulate the economic activities of the water services entities, and ensure consumer protection. A National Transition Unit would oversee the establishment of the new water services entities over the next two years.

=== First reading ===
On 9 June, the Government's Water Services Entities Bill was subject to its first reading in the New Zealand House of Representatives. The bill's sponsor Mahuta argued that the Bill would ensure public ownership of water assets, ensure balance sheet separation, uphold the Treaty of Waitangi, and ensure good governance in board selection processes. While all parties agreed that New Zealand's water infrastructure needed reform, the opposition National and ACT parties opposed the bill on the grounds that the centralisation of water assets undermined local democratic control and that co-governance was divisive. By contrast, Green Party MP Eugenie Sage argued that the bill was necessary since local government had under-invested in water infrastructure and defended the co-governance provisions of the bill. The Water Services Entities Bill passed its first reading by a margin of 77 (Labour, Māori, and Green parties) to 42 (National and ACT).

=== Select committee stage ===
Following its first reading, the Water Services Entities Bill was submitted to the Finance and Expenditure Committee, which opened the legislation to public submissions on until 22 July 2022. By 11 November 2022, the Water Services Entities Bill had received over 80,000 submissions.

In mid–July 2022, several local councils including the Nelson City Council, the New Plymouth District Council, Tasman District Council, and the Dunedin City Council filed their submissions regarding the Government's Water Services Entities Bill. The Nelson City Council's draft submission was informed by a survey of local public opinion and public forums which found that 87% of respondents opposed the Three Waters reforms while 13% supported it. The New Plymouth District Council voted by a margin of 13 to two to oppose the Bill and instead proposed an alternative Taranaki-wide water services entity. However, the Council rejected Councillor Murray Chong's motion that they join the anti-Three Waters Communities For Local Democracy. The Tasman District Council's draft submission expressed preference that the Tasman District be part of the proposed Entity D along with most of the South Island rather than Entity C, which would cover the Wellington Region and the eastern North Island. The Dunedin City Council's submission advocated the creation of an entity to manage water usage for the Otago and Southland Regions.

In addition, Mayor of Kaipara and National Party candidate Jason Smith's submission proposed incorporating a clause into the legislation allowing a threshold of 25 percent of Members of Parliament to veto any proposal to privatise New Zealand's water infrastructure. He also advocated setting a 75% parliamentary approval threshold for authorising the bill's privatisation provisions.

On 2 August 2022, the Southland District Council's submission called on the Government to suspend its Three Water Services Entities Bill until more information about the entities' functions and responsibilities were provided to the public. It also advocated combining the two planned water services legislation into one. While the Southland District Council supported having Māori representatives on the proposed regional representative groups and regional advisory panels, it expressed concern about the inadequate representation of territorial authorities on the regional representative group.

On 3 August 2022, the Queenstown-Lakes District Council's submission opposed the Bill on the grounds that its shareholding model did not account for high visitor numbers and rapid growth in the region, insufficient community understanding about the nature of the reforms, concerns that local community and territorial shareholder voices would be heard, and concerns about the diversity of representation on the regional representative groups.

In response to the submissions, the Finance and Expenditure Committee's report recommended several changes to the bill including:

- Requiring a mixture of rural, provincial and metropolitan councils on the regional representative group.
- Establishing annual shareholders' meetings that would be open to the public.
- Improving accountability measures including strengthened reporting lines and obligations, and increased audit scrutiny.

However, co-governance aspects of the legislation would be retained including giving local councils and mana whenua equal representation in managing the entities. While Local Government Minister Mahuta reiterated the Government's support for the bill in its amended form, the opposition National and ACT parties vowed to repeal the legislation if elected into government. While the Green Party supported co-governance, it advocated councils retaining ownership of local water resources and infrastructure and advocated seven local water services instead of four.

According to the Finance and Expenditure Committee's chair Barbara Edmonds, approximately 82,000 of the 88,383 submissions were based on four templates or form submissions produced by the New Zealand Taxpayers' Union and the National Party, which both opposed the legislation. In response, the Committee aggregated and produced one example of each of these templates.

=== Second reading ===
On 16 November, the Bill passed its second reading by a margin of 76 to 43. The Labour, Green, and Māori parties also voted to accept the recommendations of the Finance and Expenditure Committee. National and ACT maintained their opposition to the legislation. The bill's sponsor Mahuta argued that the legislation would help fix the country's ageing water infrastructure. Similar sentiments were echoed by Labour MPs Barbara Edmonds, Ingrid Leary, Anna Lorck, Helen White, Kieran McAnulty, and Green MP Eugenie Sage. During the second reading, several National MPs including Simon Watts, Matt Doocey, Nicola Grigg, Maureen Pugh, and ACT MP Simon Court spoke against the bill and criticised the Government for ignoring public opposition to the bill.

=== Committee of the whole House ===
On 23 November, the Labour Government decided to push the Water Services Entities Bill under urgency to compensate for the loss of a week's worth of parliamentary sitting time caused by Queen Elizabeth II's death on 9 September 2022. In late November 2022, the Green MP Sage convinced the Labour Party to support a Green proposal to incorporate an entrenchment clause that would require a 60% parliamentary vote for public water services to be privatised. This entrenchment clause was controversial and was criticised by the opposition National and ACT parties as well as the New Zealand Law Society. In response to opposition, Leader of the House Chris Hipkins announced on 4 December 2022 that the entrenchment clause would be removed.

In early December 2022, the Bill's sponsor Mahuta attracted controversy for endorsing the Green Party's establishment clause; which went against the Labour Cabinet's position opposing the entrenchment clause. Within New Zealand law, entrenchment clauses have traditionally been reserved for constitutional matters in the Electoral Act 1993 such as the voting age. Mahuta's actions were criticised by National Party leader Christopher Luxon and Shadow Leader of the House Chris Bishop. In response to opposition criticism, Prime Minister Ardern defended Mahuta and accused Luxon of misrepresenting Mahuta's actions. She also reaffirmed Labour's opposition to privatising water assets. Luxon has denied that the National Party has intentions of privatising water assets if elected into government.

=== Third reading ===
On 7 December, the Three Water Services Entities Bill passed its third and final reading with the sole support of the Labour Party (64:50 votes). While National and ACT maintained their opposition to the Bill, the Green Party voted against the Bill after Labour opted to drop the Greens' anti-privatisation clause. Sage claimed that the Bill in its present form would allow National and ACT to privatise New Zealand's water assets. The Māori Party objected to the Bill on the grounds that it fell short of what it termed "proper co-governance." The Bill's sponsor Mahuta defended the Bill on the grounds that it would help address water contamination and quality issues, citing the 2016 Havelock North campylobacter contamination incident and a recent "boil water" notice in the Matamata-Piako District. However, the boil water notice in the Matamata-Piako District that occurred around the time of the third reading was only precautionary and was instigated because “Low chlorine levels have been found at some…water testing sites around Morrinsville.” And there was “no evidence of contamination but as a precautionary measure, Morrinsville residents are advised to boil all drinking water”

=== Repeal ===
Following the 2023 New Zealand general election, the National-led coalition government passed the Water Services Acts Repeal Bill on 14 February 2024, which repealed the previous Labour Government's Three Waters legislation including the Water Services Entities Act 2022.

== Responses ==
=== Advocacy groups ===
Following its first reading on 9 June 2022, farming advocacy group Groundswell NZ's co-founders Laurie Paterson and Bryce McKenzie expressed opposition to the proposed legislation but admitted that they had not read it.

In its submission on the Water Services Entities Bill, the New Zealand Taxpayers' Union disputed the Government's assertion that local councils would continue to own their own water assets. The Union disputed the Government's definition of "community ownership," claiming that councils were denied key attributes of ownership including the rights of possession, control, derivation of benefits, and disposition.

=== Local councils ===
Communities 4 Local Democracy leader and Manawatū District Mayor Helen Worboys opposed the bill on the grounds that it would take local community assets without compensation.

In response to the introduction of the Water Services Entities Bill, the Timaru, Waimakariri and Whangarei district councils sought a High Court declaration relating to the rights and interests of property ownership over the water assets.

=== Māori bodies ===
In early December 2022, Te Rūnanga o Ngāi Tahu Kaiwhakahaere (chairperson) Lisa Tumahai welcomed the passage of the Water Services Entities Bill as a means of improving the quality of water services and allowing her tribe to share their governing expertise, commercial acumen, traditional knowledge, and scientific research into geology and hydrology with local councils.

=== Political parties ===
The opposition National Party's local government spokesperson Simon Watts claimed that the Water Services Entities Bill amounted to the theft of local assets and the centralisation of local decision-making powers in a "complex and unaccountable bureaucracy." Courts vowed that National would repeal and replaced the Government's Three Waters reform if elected into Government in 2023.

The ACT Party's spokesperson Simon Court also objected to the transfer of local councils' water assets into a new centralised bureaucracy and alleged that the proposed legislation would worsen ethnic divisions in New Zealand. As an alternative to the water services entities, ACT has proposed that local councils establish public-private partnerships to attract investment from financial entities such as KiwiSaver funds, the Accident Compensation Corporation, and Māori iwi (tribal) investment funds.
