= Fair Pay Agreements Act 2022 =

Repealed act of parliament in New Zealand

New Zealand Parliament
- Royal assent: 1 November 2022
- Repealed: 20 December 2023

Legislative history
- Introduced by: Michael Wood
- First reading: 5 April 2022
- Second reading: 18 October 2022
- Third reading: 25 October 2022
- Status: Repealed

The Fair Pay Agreements Act 2022, now repealed, was an act of parliament in New Zealand. The act facilitated a framework for collective bargaining for fair pay agreements at an industry-wide level. On 25 October 2022, the Bill passed its third reading in Parliament. While the bill was supported by the Labour, Green and Māori parties, it was opposed by the opposition National and ACT parties, which vowed to repeal it if elected during the 2023 New Zealand general election. On 14 December 2023, the National-led coalition government repealed the Fair Pay Agreements Act as part of its first raft of legislative changes.

== Key provisions ==
The Fair Pay Agreements Act 2022 outlined the criteria and framework of the fair pay agreements (FPA) process. The Bill protected the right to voluntary membership of unions and employer associations. Employee and employer bargaining parties can only represent members of unions and employer associations respectively. Fair pay agreements and other similar contracts and arrangements cannot confer preference on employers or employees regardless of their membership of unions or employment associations. Parties are also required to act in "good faith" during negotiations.

=== Preliminary requirements ===
The Bill outlined the process for initiating bargaining and forming bargaining sides. These parties consisted of the employee and employer bargaining parties. A union wishing to initiate collective bargaining for a proposed FPA must apply to the chief executive for approval. The criteria for approval included at least 1,000 employees or 10% of employees within the coverage of the proposed FPA supporting the application to initiate bargaining for the proposed fair pay agreement. Key conditions for proceeding with an FPA include employees receiving low pay, have little bargaining power in their employment agreement, lack meaningful pay progression, work long and unsocial hours, or perform seasonal or irregular work.

The Bill also outlined the process for seeking approval to initiate the FPA bargaining process, submitting evidence, and the coverage of the proposed FPA based on occupation, industry or type of work. The Bill also outlined the timeframe and process for the chief executive giving approval to initiate FPA bargaining.

The Bill also required the initiating union to inform other unions and employers of approval to initiate bargaining within 15 days after receiving the chief executive's approval. The employer was also required to inform employees and unions about the bargaining process after 15 days of approval being granted to initiate bargaining. The employer was also required to provide employees' contact details to the employee bargaining side.

Employers could also nominate an approved employer association to serve as the employer bargaining party, subject to the approval of the chief executive. Other approved employer bargaining parties included state employers such as the Public Service Commissioner, the Chief of the New Zealand Defence Force, Chief of Parliamentary Counsel, Commissioner of Police, and Te Whatu Ora (Health New Zealand). Other unions could also apply to be an additional employee bargaining party, subject to the chief executive's approval.

=== FPA bargaining process ===
The Bill outlined the process for the employee and employer bargaining parties to arrange fair pay agreement meetings, including pay compensation. It also outlined the criteria for employee bargaining parties to access enter workplaces with the exception of dwellinghouses, national security or religious grounds.

It also outlined the bargaining process including the parties providing information to each other, requester or independent reviewer. It also required employee bargaining parties to provide adequate representation to covered members including Māori employees. Similarly, the employer bargaining party was required to provide adequate representation to covered members including Māori employers. The Bill also provided provisions for when bargaining parties ceased to be parties to the FPA process and for changes in coverage, overlap, consolidation, and additions of occupations to the FPA bargaining process.

The Bill also outlined the mandatory content for fair pay agreements including the date on which the agreement came into force and ends, the coverage of the agreement, wage details including wage rates, training and development arrangements, and leave arrangements. The FPA was also required to outline wage details including the minimum base rates and overtime rates. FPA agreements would also cover the topics of the proposed agreement, health and safety requirements, flexible working arrangements, redundancy arrangements, and minimum entitlement provisions.

The Bill also outlined the FPA finalisation process including the Employment Relations Authority's (ERA) compliance assessment, the ratification process, the chief executive's verification process and checks for overlap between different fair pay agreements, and the chief executive's notice to bring the proposed FPA into force.

The Bill also discussed the variation, renewal, and replacement process for fair pay agreements. It also outlined the process for enforcement and penalties for non-compliance with the FPA process, with ERA being given jurisdiction over these matters. The Bill also outlined the mediation process including the role of mediation services, bargaining support services and ERA. It also empowered Labour Inspectors to determine coverage of fair pay agreements.

== History ==
=== Working Group ===
In June 2018, the Sixth Labour Government established a Fair Pay Agreements Working Group to advise on the design of a sector-level bargaining system. The Working Group was chaired by former Prime Minister Rt Hon Jim Bolger. The Government sought to address the rising disparity between wage increases and labour productivity and combat a "race to the bottom" situation in certain sectors where businesses competed for contracts by reducing wages or employment conditions. In addition, union membership had dropped from 70% in 1992 to less than 20% by 2022. The Government proposed addressing these issues by establishing a Fair Pay Agreement (FPA) system to facilitate collective bargaining between employers and unions to reach agreed minimum standards for pay and working conditions, provide support for bargaining parties in negotiating the FPA process, and ensure compliance.

The Working Group released its report to the Minister for Workplace Relations and Safety Iain Lees-Galloway in December 2018. This report discussed the issues facing the development of fair pay agreement system in New Zealand and gave advice on the legal and enforcement mechanisms.

=== Consultation ===
In October 2019, the Government released a discussion paper seeking feedback on a range of options for the design of the FPA system. This consultation closed in late November 2019. This discussion paper proposed a four-stage Fair Pay Agreements process where unions with the consent of their workers initiated the FPA process and decided which work they wanted to be covered. Second, the discussion paper defined the key bargaining parties (unions and employers' representatives), the scope of the agreements and exemptions. Third, the paper proposed that the parties would receive support in the form of training, a government-provided bargaining support person and outlined the process for communications between unions and workers, and external mediation by the Employment Relations Authority (ERA). Fourth, the paper outlined the verification process for an FPA agreement including vetting by ERA, and ratification by employees, employers, and enactment and enforcement by the ERA and Labour Inspectorate.

In May 2021, the Government released the design of the Fair Pay Agreements system, which was informed by input from the Fair Pay Agreements Working Group and public consultation. In addition, the New Zealand Council of Trade Unions and BusinessNZ contributed to the development of the FPA model.

=== Introduction and first reading ===
The Fair Pay Agreements Bill was introduced to Parliament on 29 March 2022. The Bill passed its first reading on 5 April 2022 by a margin of 77 to 43. While the Labour, Green parties and Te Pati Māori supported the Bill, it was opposed by the opposition National and ACT parties. The bill's sponsor Labour MP Michael Wood (the-then Minister for Workplace Relations and Safety) argued that a fair pay agreements system would protect the rights and economic security of workers, and provided a framework for sector-wide collective bargaining between employers and unions. Similar sentiments were echoed by fellow Labour MPs Stuart Nash, Meka Whaitiri, Marja Lubeck, Angela Roberts, Camilla Belich, Ibrahim Omer and Green MP Jan Logie, who argued that the FPA system did not target "good" employers, would protect workers' rights, ensure fairness in the workplace, address cost of living pressures.

National MPs Paul Goldsmith, Scott Simpson, David Bennett, and Todd McClay and ACT MP Chris Baillie argued that the FPA system would favour unions at the expense of employers and employees, impede entrepreneurialism, and impose red tape on businesses, and harm the economy. Goldsmith claimed that trade unions were increasingly irrelevant in New Zealand and that the bill amounted to "compulsory unionisation" by stealth. Baillie also claimed that the fair pay agreements system was unnecessary since employees' pay and conditions had improved substantially following the introduction of the employment contracts agreement system in 1991. McClay claimed that the FPA system would hurt the New Zealand and impede recovery following the COVID-19 pandemic.

=== Select committee stage ===
The Fair Pay Agreements Bill was referred to the Education and Workforce Committee on 5 April 2022. The Committee also considered parliamentary paper G.46C alongside the Bill at the request of the Minister for Workplace Relations and Safety. This paper proposed a "backstop policy" for a situation where no party was willing to represent the non-initiating bargaining side. In that situation, the Employment Relations Authority would be allowed to set the terms of the FPA. G.46c also proposed making the default bargaining party role voluntary rather than mandatory.

The Fair Pay Agreements Bill also received 1,796 written submissions and 120 oral submission by 19 May 2022. On 5 October 2022, the Education and Workforce Committee released its report, recommending that the Bill proceed to further readings with some amendments. During the select committee stage, the ACT party reiterated its opposition to the Bill, stating that it violated freedom of association by allowing unions to represent workers even when the worker did not wish that to happen. Similarly, the National Party claimed the Bill allowed the Government to impose mandatory union deals on workplaces and vowed to repeal it if elected into government at the 2023 New Zealand general election.

=== Second reading ===
On 18 October 2022, Parliament voted by a margin of 77 to 43 votes to accept the Education and Workforce Committee's recommendations to progress the Fair Pay Agreements Bill. The Bill also passed its second reading by a margin of 77 to 43 votes. While Labour, the Greens, Te Pati Māori and independent candidate Gaurav Sharma voted to progress the legislation, National and ACT affirmed their opposition to the Fair Pay Agreements Bill.

=== Third reading ===
On 25 October 2022, the Fair Pay Agreements Bill passed its third reading by a margin of 76 to 43 votes. While Labour, Green parties and Te Pati Māori supported the Bill, it was opposed by National and ACT. Labour and Green MPs hailed the Bill's passage as a victory for workers' rights while National and ACT MPs criticised the legislation as a threat to voluntary unionisation and market flexibility. National vowed to repeal the legislation if it formed the next government following the 2023 election. The Bill received royal assent on 1 November 2022.

While the Bill came into effect in December 2022, no fair pay agreements had been reached by the time of its repeal in December 2023. Businesses opposed the legislation on the grounds that it impose extra conditions including increased costs.

=== Repeal ===
Following the 2023 New Zealand general election, the incoming National-led coalition government reaffirmed its commitment to repealing the Fair Pay Agreements Act before Christmas 2023 as part of National's coalition agreements with the allied ACT and New Zealand First parties. The Government's repeal plans drew opposition from several unions including Stand Up, the New Zealand Nurses Organisation, Post Primary Teachers' Association, Unite Union, and First Union New Zealand, who claimed it would disadvantage workers and drive down wages and working conditions. On 11 December 2023, about 150 protesters picketed the electorate offices of ACT party leader David Seymour and deputy leader Brooke Van Velden. They were joined by several opposition MPs including Labour's workplace relations spokesperson Camila Belich, fellow Labour MP Phil Twyford, Greens co-leader Marama Davidson and Ricardo Menéndez March. By contrast, Retail NZ chief executive Carolyn Young welcomed the repeal of Fair Pay Agreements, claiming they were inflexible and complicated employment laws.

On 14 December, the Government's Fair Pay Agreements Act Repeal Act 2023 passed its third reading under urgency. While the repeal bill was supported by National, ACT and NZ First, it was opposed by Labour, the Greens and Te Pāti Māori. The Minister for Workplace Relations and Safety Van Velden welcomed the repeal of the FPA Act, stating that "fair pay agreements were never about fairness, they forced a minority of union worker's views on all affected workers and businesses and this government opposes the views that were put forward by the previous government and that law." The Fair Pay Agreements Repeal Act received royal assent on 19 December and came into force on 20 December. Consequently, New Zealand reverted to the previous workplace framework where collective bargaining was limited to unions and particular employers.

== See also ==
- Trade unions in New Zealand
- Employment Relations Act 2000
