= Counter-Terrorism Legislation Act 2021 =

Act of Parliament in New Zealand

New Zealand Parliament
- Royal assent: 4 October 2021

Legislative history
- Introduced by: Kris Faafoi
- First reading: 5 May 2021
- Second reading: 21 September 2021
- Third reading: 29 September 2021

Amends
- Terrorism Suppression Act 2002; Search and Surveillance Act 2012; Terrorism Suppression (Control Orders) Act 2019
- Status: Current legislation

The Counter-Terrorism Legislation Act 2021 is an Act of Parliament in New Zealand which strengthens counter-terrorism laws, including a provision makes the planning of a terrorist attack a criminal offence. It was fast-tracked through Parliament due to the 2021 Auckland supermarket stabbing. The bill was supported by the Labour and National parties but opposed by the ACT, Green, and Māori parties. The bill received royal assent on 4 October 2021.

== Background ==
United Nations Security Council Resolution 2178, enacted in September 2014, called upon member states to prevent the "recruiting, organizing, transporting or equipping of individuals" planning to enact or participate "in terrorist acts".

Gaps in the previously enacted Terrorism Suppression Act 2002 were identified in 2020. In a July 2020 court case involving charges of possession of offensive weapons and objectionable material, the High Court's judgment stated that "the absence of an offence of planning or preparing a terrorist act (falling short of existing inchoate offences) could be an Achilles heel." In the sentencing of the perpetrator of the 2019 Christchurch mosque shootings in August 2020, a regulatory impact assessment said that the "terrorist acts" section of the 2002 Act "remains untested by the courts" and that Police "have identified that there are aspects of the definition that may impede their ability to utilise the [Act] as intended". The Royal Commission of Inquiry into the Christchurch attack recommended that the Government "review all legislation related to the counter-terrorism effort [...] to ensure it is current and enables Public sector agencies to operate effectively prioritising consideration of the creation of precursor terrorism offences".

The 2021 Auckland supermarket stabbing occurred after this bill was introduced into Parliament. The Crown had, prior to the attack, tried and failed to charge the perpetrator under the Terrorism Suppression Act because planning to commit a terrorist attack was not an offence under the current law. Prime Minister Jacinda Ardern subsequently promised to fast-track this bill through Parliament.

== Legislation ==
The proposed law change amends the existing terrorism legislation and creates offences in the Terrorism Suppression Act "that may be broadly described as precursory in nature, including an offence of planning or preparing for a terrorist act".

The bill would:

- Criminalise travel to, from, or via New Zealand with the intention to carry out an offence specified in the Terrorism Suppression Act.
- Criminalise planning or preparing a terrorist act.
- Apply warrantless powers of entry, search, and surveillance to individuals suspected of the above offense.
- More clearly criminalise weapons or combat training for the purpose of engaging in terrorism.
- Criminalise wider forms of material support for terrorist activities or organisations.
- Extend the control orders regime so that individuals who have completed a prison sentence for specified offences related to terrorism may be subject to the regime if they continue to present a risk of engaging in terrorist activity.

== Legislative history ==
=== Introduction ===
The bill was introduced to Parliament on 13 April 2021 by Minister of Justice and Labour MP Kris Faafoi.

=== First reading ===
The bill passed its first reading in Parliament on 5 May 2021. Faafoi stated that "the bill brings New Zealand into line with the way that terrorism is criminalised" overseas.

=== Second reading ===
The bill passed its second reading on 21 September 2021 with support from Labour and National and opposition from ACT, the Greens, and the Māori Party. ACT expressed concern at the speed at which that the bill was being passed, saying that more time should be allowed to make improvements to it.

=== Third reading ===
The bill passed its third reading in Parliament in an extended session on 29–30 September 2021 with support of both Labour and National. ACT justice spokesperson Nicole McKee agreed that the current legislation had some gaps but opposed the fast nature of the bill's passage. National Party justice spokesperson Simon Bridges said the bill was "a good thing" and denied that the bill had been rushed.

=== Royal assent ===
The bill received royal assent on 4 October 2021, becoming an Act of Parliament, and is current legislation.
