= Resource Management (Enabling Housing Supply and Other Matters) Amendment Act 2021 =

Act of Parliament in New Zealand

New Zealand Parliament
- Royal assent: 20 December 2021

Legislative history
- Introduced by: David Parker
- First reading: 26 October 2021
- Second reading: 7 December 2021
- Third reading: 14 December 2021

Related legislation
- Resource Management Act 1991
- Status: Current legislation

The Resource Management (Enabling Housing Supply and Other Matters) Amendment Act 2021 is a New Zealand Act of Parliament. The act amends the Resource Management Act 1991 to rapidly boost the supply of housing in areas where the demand for housing is high. This act seeks to address New Zealand's housing shortage and unaffordable housing. The bill passed its third reading on 15 December 2021, with the support of most parties in the New Zealand House of Representatives except the libertarian ACT Party.

== Key provisions ==
The Resource Management (Enabling Housing Supply and Other Matters) Amendment Act's provisions allow for more types of housing to be built without resource consent, as long as:

- A maximum of three residential units to be built per site.
- Buildings do not exceed 11 metres in height, with the exception of 50% of a building's roof in elevation. This area measured vertically from the junction between wall and roof, may exceed this height by 1 metre, where the entire roof slopes 15 degrees or more.
- The maximum building coverage does not exceed 50% of the net site area.
- A residential unit at ground floor level has an outdoor living space that is at least 20 square metres and that comprises ground floor, or balcony, patio, or roof terrace space.
- A residential unit located above ground floor level has an accessible outdoor living space in the form of a balcony, patio, or roof terrace that is at least eight square metres and has a minimum dimension of 1.8 meters.

== Legislative history ==
On 19 October, the Labour and National parties supported the bipartisan Resource Management (Enabling Housing Supply and Other Matters) Amendment Bill during its first reading. The bill aims to build 105,500 new homes over the next eight years by allowing three homes of up to three storeys to be built on most sites without requiring a resource consent process. The Government planned to pass the bill by the end of 2021, with local councils implementing it from August 2022. In addition, the bill was supported by the Green and Māori parties but was opposed by the libertarian ACT Party.

The bill underwent an expedited select committee stage, taking several weeks rather than months. According to the National Party's deputy leader Nicola Wilis, the select committee made several amendments to allow for landscaped areas, greater outdoor spaces, and to reduce the height of houses in relation to their boundaries. Other changes included giving local territorial authorities the authority to exclude "unsuitable areas" such as those subject to natural hazards, historically significant sites, and areas that would not be able to support the level of housing that the bill specified.

The Bill passed its second reading on 7 December with the support of the Labour, National, Green, and Māori parties. Only the ACT Party opposed the bill. During the second reading, the bill was amended to reduce the maximum height that people can build to on their boundary from 6 metres to 4 metres.

On 14 December, the Bill passed its third and final reading with the bipartisan support of most parties except ACT, which claimed that the legislation would do little to address the cause of the country's housing crisis. Under the legislation, local territorial authorities including the Auckland Council, Hamilton City Council, Tauranga City Council, Wellington City Council and the Christchurch City Council will have to allow the building of up to three houses with a maximum of three storeys on the vast majority of urban sections without requiring resource consents. The passage of the bill was welcomed by both Housing Minister Megan Woods and Environment Minister David Parker, who claimed that it would allow more affordable housing to be built. By contrast, ACT housing spokesperson and deputy leader Brooke van Velden claimed that the new bipartisan law would not resolve the housing shortage but would instead create more sewage on the streets.
