= List of Fast-track Approvals Act 2024 projects =

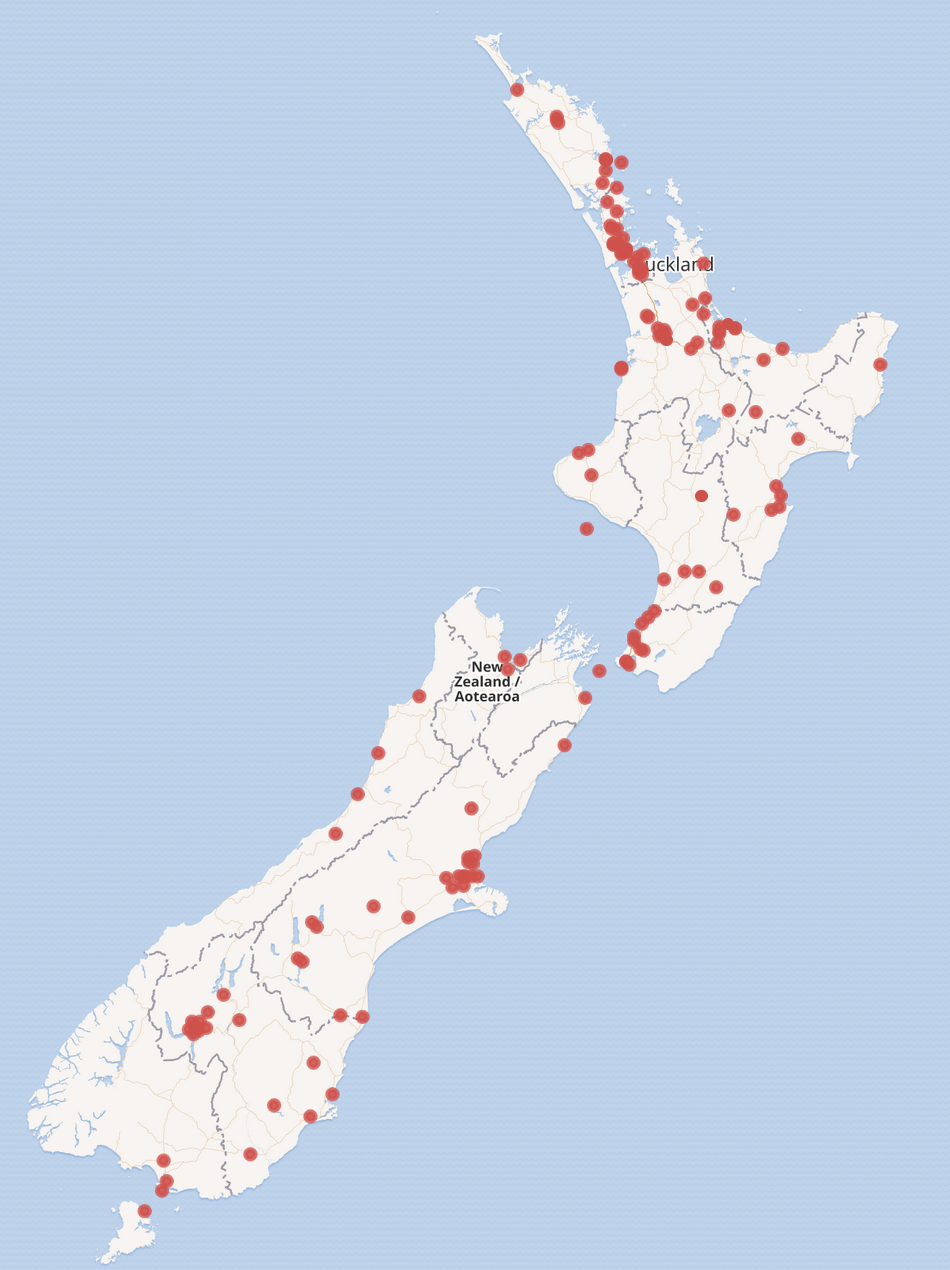
Map of Fast-track approvals bill projects. For interactive map see https://w.wiki/EhFM

The Fast-track Approvals Act 2024 project list is a list of the 149 projects seeking approval through the Fast-track Approvals Act 2024 in New Zealand.

The list of projects to be included in the Bill was released publicly on 6 October 2024. The list includes 44 housing developments, 7 aquaculture and farming projects, 43 infrastructure projects, 22 renewable energy projects, and 11 mining and quarrying projects. The locations of some projects were unspecified, such as the Waikato-based 'Green Steel' project to recycle shredded steel. The list included some projects, such as Trans-Tasman Resources' proposed sea bed mining project, and the Waitaha Hydro Project, that had been previously rejected due to their likely adverse environmental effects.

On 31 October the Auditor-General announced that he would conduct an enquiry into how conflicts of interest were identified and handled in the project selection process. Radio New Zealand reported that "companies and shareholders associated with 12 projects gave more than NZ$500,000 in political donations to National, ACT and New Zealand First".

Applicant	Project name	Region	Sector	Project description
Ministry of Housing and Urban Development and Rōpū of Nga Mana Whenua o Tamaki Makaurau	Carrington Residential Development	Auckland	Housing and Land Development	The project is a large-scale residential development on 39.7 hectares of Crown owned land in Mt Albert, Auckland delivering approximately 4,000 – 4,500 homes over 10 – 15+ years in a mix of typologies.
Fulton Hogan Land Development Ltd	Milldale Stages 4C and 10–13	Auckland	Housing and Land Development	To undertake earthworks and civil works to create sites for over 1,100 residential sites.
Vineway Limited	Delmore	Auckland	Housing and Land Development	The project is to subdivide a 109-hectare site in Orewa, Auckland and construct a master-planned residential development providing a complete urban outcome of approximately 1250 homes complete with parks, river-side walkways, and supporting infrastructure.
Winton Land Limited	Sunfield	Auckland	Housing and Land Development	The project is a master planned community in Ardmore, Auckland which provides for460,000 square metres of employment, retail, healthcare and education buildings, a 7.6-hectare town centre, a school, 3400 houses, 3 retirement villages consisting of approximately 600 independent living units and care beds and 27.7 hectares of open spaces, green links, recreation parks and reserves and ecological offsets.
The Eden Park Trust	Eden Park 2.1.	Auckland	Housing and Land Development	The project is the redevelopment of the existing Eden Park facility in Auckland to deliver a world class hybrid, multi-purpose 50,000+ capacity stadium with a retractable roof to enable the delivery of a greater number and range of events and content, increasing the utilisation and optimisation of the facility.
Rangitoopuni Developments Limited Partnership	Rangitoopuni	Auckland	Housing and Land Development	The project is to develop a 210 lot residential subdivision and 350 unit retirement village on the southern portion of the 3,275 hectares of Rangitoopuni-Riverhead.
Classic Group	Warkworth South (Waimanawa)	Auckland	Housing and Land Development	The Warkworth South (Waimanawa) project will create a new township (including 1200 residential units) to the south of Warkworth.
Kiwi Property Holdings No. 2 Ltd	Drury Metropolitan Centre – Consolidated Stage 1 and 2	Auckland	Housing and Land Development	The project is to subdivide 53.2 hectares land and develop these sites for a commercial retail centre (including 10,000m2 commercial, 56,000m2 retail and 2,000m2 community activities) and future residential activities in accordance with the underlying Metropolitan Centre and Mixed-Use zones.
Beachlands South Limited Partnership	Beachlands South	Auckland	Housing and Land Development	The project is to construct approximately 2,700 homes; two schools; and commercial activities.
Ngāti Manuhiri Settlement Trust and Te Ārai South Holdings Limited or Nominees representing the Te Ārai South Joint Venture	Integrated Development Plan for Te Arai South Precinct and Regional Park	Auckland	Housing and Land Development	The project is an integrated development of the Te Arai Precinct, including 420 residential units.
Precinct Properties New Zealand Limited	The Downtown Carpark Redevelopment – Te Pūmanawa o Tāmaki	Auckland	Housing and Land Development	The Project comprises the demolition of the existing Downtown Carpark Building and the subsequent construction of two towers closer to Lower Hobson Road on the western side of the site. Three podium buildings will be built, together with a significant new public realm including an extensive new laneway network and civic space.
North Eastern Investments Limited	NEIL Fairview Heights Development	Auckland	Housing and Land Development	The project is an 1800-unit intensive residential and 3100m2 commercial multilevel development with basement parking on an arterial road in Albany, within walking distance of the Albany Metropolitan Centre and the Albany Bus Station.
New Zealand Transport Agency Waka Kotahi	North West Rapid Transit	Auckland	Infrastructure	To develop a rapid transit link between Brigham Creek and Auckland City Centre, including local road links and connections to other existing rapid transit infrastructure and a bi-directional offline busway. This will provide public transport choices to safely and efficiently meet demands for moving people, freight and services along SH16, the main corridor between the NW and Auckland CBD.
New Zealand Transport Agency Waka Kotahi (NZTA)	Mill Road	Auckland	Infrastructure	To change 21 km of road between the Redoubt Road interchange on SH1 in Manukau to the proposed Drury South Interchange on SH1 in Drury. It involves a new corridor which will be a mix of new road and upgrades of existing roads. There will be upgrades to numerous existing intersections and potentially works to existing local roads which will intersect with the new corridor.
New Zealand Transport Agency Waka Kotahi	SH16 North West Alternative State Highway	Auckland	Infrastructure	To construct a new four-laned dual carriageway motorway and the upgrade of Brigham Creek Interchange on SH16, to provide a connection for interregional and freight trips between Redhills North and SH16 west of Kumeū-Huapai, as an alternative to the existing SH16.
Ministry of Justice	Papakura District Courthouse (New) Project	Auckland	Infrastructure	The project is for a Notice of Requirement to designate the site for the following purposes: "Judicial, court, tribunal and related purposes including collection of fines and reparation, administration, support, custodial services, and ancillary activities.
KiwiRail Holdings Limited	Crosstown (Avondale -Southdown) Corridor	Auckland	Infrastructure	The Avondale-Southdown Railway will complete a long planned cross-isthmus rail corridor connecting east–west via Onehunga, creating significant new connectivity, capacity and network resilience. It will provide a new public transport corridor and freight bypass from the inner-city Isthmus and complete the missing limb to Auckland's heavy rail network.
Auckland Transport	Papakura to Pukekohe Route Protection – Four-tracking and Active Mode Corridor	Auckland	Infrastructure	The Papakura to Pukekohe Route Protection – Four-tracking and Active Mode Corridor project will remove six level crossings and associated crossing interventions while establishing an active mode corridor to facilitate and support KiwiRail's four tracking transport project. The active mode corridor will start at Pukekohe and terminate at Drury Railway Station.
Port of Auckland Limited	Bledisloe North Wharf and Fergusson North Berth Extension	Auckland	Infrastructure	The project is to construct: a new 330m long x 34m wide reinforced concrete piled wharf structure to the northern edge of the Bledisloe Terminal for roll-on/roll-off and large cruise ships; a 45m long x 34m wide reinforced concrete piled extension to the length of the existing Fergusson North Berth to accommodate larger container ships; related to the above, POAL will establish a new cruise passenger terminal within the ground floor of the existing vehicle handling facility on the Bledisloe Terminal; fendering (and other ancillary structures, as required) will be provided around both wharf structures, in a similar manner to that which exists for the balance of the wharves within the Port of Auckland.
Auckland Transport	Airport to Botany Bus Rapid Transit	Auckland	Infrastructure	The project is the construction and operation of approximately 15 km Bus Rapid Transit facility and walking and cycling facilities, connecting the Auckland Airport Precinct to Botany Town Centre through Manukau Central.
KiwiRail Holdings Limited	Four Tracking Westfield to Pukekohe	Auckland	Infrastructure	The project involves widening the existing rail corridor and undertaking works to expand the North Island Main Trunk (NIMT) between Westfield Junction (Newmarket) and Pukekohe (38 km) from the current two tracks railway to a four track railway including grade-separating Westfield Junction where the NIMT meets the North Auckland Line (NAL) and in future the Crosstown (Avondale-Southdown) Corridor.
Auckland Transport	Auckland Level Crossings Removals	Auckland	Infrastructure	The project comprises the removal of 42 Level Crossings across the Auckland Region to address growing safety, severance and accessibility issues while enabling higher train frequencies and many of the benefits from recent, current and planned investments in Auckland's transport system, including the City Rail Link project.
Ara Poutama Aotearoa the Department of Corrections	Auckland Prison Capacity Increase	Auckland	Infrastructure	The project is to alter Auckland Prison's designation conditions under the Auckland Unitary Plan via a Notice of Requirement to enable the current limit on prisoner numbers to increase from 681 to 1,200.
Kings Quarry Limited	Kings Quarry Expansion – Stage 2 and 3	Auckland	Mining and Quarrying	The Kings Quarry Expansion – Stage 2 and 3 project is to expand the existing quarrying activities. The project area will occupy 60-hectares of the 152-hectares of total site area.
Winstone Aggregates (a Division of Fletcher Concrete & Infrastructure Ltd)	Flat Top Quarry Development	Auckland	Mining and Quarrying	The Flat Top Quarry project is to expand the existing Flat Top Quarry.
Fletcher Concrete & Infrastructure Ltd	Hunua Quarry Development	Auckland	Mining and Quarrying	The Hunua Quarry Development project is to expand the existing Quarry.
Stevenson Aggregates Limited	Drury Quarry Expansion – Sutton Block	Auckland	Mining and Quarrying	The Drury Quarry Expansion – Sutton Block project seeks to expand the current quarry and supplier of greywacke aggregate for concrete, asphalt and roading to the Auckland market. The Sutton Block Quarry will be located southeast of Drury and developed in stages over 50 years.
Energy Farms Limited	Wellsford Solar Farm	Auckland	Renewable Energy	The Wellsford Solar Farm project is to construct and operate a solar farm on an approximately 219-hectare site.
South Island Resource Recovery Ltd	Project Kea	Canterbury	Housing and Land Development	Project Kea is a waste to energy plant incinerating waste otherwise destined for landfill to covert to electricity or steam.
Christchurch City Council	Implementation of the Ōtākaro Avon River Corridor Regeneration Plan	Canterbury	Housing and Land Development	To provide the infrastructure and facilities to regenerate the Ōtākaro Avon River in response to the Canterbury earthquakes
Suburban Estates Limited on behalf of Anne Lois Stokes and Brian James Stokes	Gressons Road Development	Canterbury	Housing and Land Development	The project will enable the subdivision and development of approximately 1,500 homes and supporting community features including public and active transport connections, green spaces and infrastructure on a site adjoining existing residential and commercial development.
Grassmere Estates Limited	Grassmere Residential Development	Canterbury	Housing and Land Development	The Grassmere Residential Development project will consist of the development of approximately 17 hectares of residential zoned land in Papanui, Christchurch. The project will enable 528 residential units in total, in a range of housing densities, and upgrades to transport and three- waters infrastructure.
Carter Group Limited	Rolleston West Residential Development	Canterbury	Housing and Land Development	The Rolleston West Residential Development project is to construct a housing development comprising 4,200 new residential sites and four commercial centres to the west of Rolleston, 25 km southwest of Christchurch central business district.
Ben Dormer	West Rangiora Residential Development	Canterbury	Housing and Land Development	Staged subdivision and development of approximately 40 hectares of land, to create approximately 700–780 residential units (400–480 in stage 1, and 300 in stage 2), with associated road and service areas.
Carter Group Limited	Ōhoka Residential Subdivision	Canterbury	Housing and Land Development	The project will comprise: 850 houses and a commercial mixed/use centre, and a school and/or retirement village.
Ngāi Tahu Property Development Holdings	Pound Road Industrial Development	Canterbury	Housing and Land Development	The project will comprise development of industrial land in Canterbury.
Carter Group Limited	Ryans Road Industrial Development	Canterbury	Housing and Land Development	The project will comprise 55.5 hectares of industrial activities adjacent to Christchurch International Airport.
Birchs Village Limited	Birchs Village	Canterbury	Housing and Land Development	The project will comprise: 527 residential allotments and a commercial area along Birchs Road, opposite existing Kakaha Park.
Ashburton District Council	Ashburton Second Urban Bridge	Canterbury	Infrastructure	The project is to build a second urban bridge over the Ashburton/Hakatere river connecting Ashburton and Tinwald. The project will comprise: urban river bridge construction, from Chalmers Avenue in Ashburton to Grahams Road in Tinwald; provisions for vehicles, pedestrians and cyclists; a new roundabout at the South Street and Chalmers Avenue intersection in Ashburton, and new intersection in Tinwald.
New Zealand Transport Agency Waka Kotahi	State Highway 1 North Canterbury – Woodend Bypass Project (Belfast to Pegasus)	Canterbury	Infrastructure	To extend the SH1 Christchurch Northern Corridor between Belfast and Pegasus by constructing 4 km of motorway or expressway to bypass the Woodend township, to create a safe, efficient route, with travel time savings and benefits.
Mid Canterbury Water Storage Limited	Klondyke Storage	Canterbury	Infrastructure	The Klondyke Storage project aims to improve irrigation reliability of the existing MHV Water Ltd and Ashburton Lyndhurst Irrigation Ltd community irrigation schemes in mid Canterbury by constructing storage for up to 53M m3 of water.
Amuri Irrigation Company Limited	Balmoral Water Storage Facility and Fish Screen	Canterbury	Infrastructure	To construct a large dam to provide 10M m3 of water storage for the Amuri Irrigation Company Ltd.'s irrigation scheme, where they already hold resource consents to divert, take, store, use and discharge water to land in the Amuri Basin, north of the Hurunui River. The application will also address issues with the fish screen and bypass on the existing intake infrastructure.
KB Contracting and Quarries Limited	Miners Road Northern Expansion	Canterbury	Mining and Quarrying	The Miners Road Northern Expansion project seeks to expand its current aggregate extraction activities
Southern Screenworks Ltd	Southern Screenworks quarry extension and managed fill	Canterbury	Mining and Quarrying	The project is to expand the extraction of aggregate from the existing Southern Screenworks quarry and establish and operate a managed fill facility.
Far North Solar Farm Ltd	The Point Solar Farm	Canterbury	Renewable Energy	The Point Solar Farm project is to construct and operate a solar farm on a 670-hectare site, and to connect to and supply electricity to the national grid.
Black Point Solar Limited	Black Point Solar Farm	Canterbury	Renewable Energy	The Black Point Solar Farm Project is to construct and operate a solar farm and to connect to and supply electricity to the national grid.
Andrew William Simpson and Karen Frances Simpson	Balmoral Station Solar Array	Canterbury	Renewable Energy	The Balmoral Station Solar Farm project is to construct and operate a solar farm and to connect to and supply electricity to the national grid.
Genesis Energy Limited	Tekapo Power Scheme – Applications for Replacement Resource Consents	Canterbury	Renewable Energy	The project is to continue the use, operations and maintenance of the power scheme situated between Lake Tekapo (at a higher elevation) to the northeast near Tekapo and Lake Pukaki (as a lower elevation) to the southwest near Twizel.
Lodestone Energy Limited	Haldon Station Limited	Canterbury	Renewable Energy	The Haldon Solar project is to construct and operate a solar farm on 320-hectares of a 7689- hectare site and to connect and supply electricity to the national grid.
Sanford Limited	Sanford Second Greenshell Mussel Spat Hatchery	Canterbury	Aquaculture and farming	The Sanford Second Greenshell Mussel Spat Hatchery project is to construct and operate a land based Greenshell mussel spat hatchery.
National Green Steel Limited	Green Steel	Waikato	Housing and Land Development	The Green Steel project is to construct and operate a structural steel manufacturing plant on 53- hectares of land. The plant will use recycled scrap steel, sourced from across New Zealand and shredded on-site.
Tainui Group Holdings Limited	Ruakura Tuumata Residential and Commercial	Waikato	Housing and Land Development	To develop a new master-planned residential neighbourhood over 68 hectares of between 1100- 1300 homes, including a Neighbourhood Centre, and on a separate but nearby 14 hectare site, a large format retail centre.
CDL Land New Zealand Limited	CDL – Ruakura 2 (R2) Growth Cell	Waikato	Housing and Land Development	The Ruakura 2 (R2) Growth Cell Project is to subdivide and develop 211 hectares of land for residential housing (1350 residential units) and 35 hectares of industrial at Puketaha, on the Waikato District side of its territorial boundary with Hamilton City.
Malcolm's Rest Limited, Lloyd Seeney and Kathryn Seeney	Wallace Road Stage 1A and 1B subdivision and land use consent with associated roading and infrastructure.	Waikato	Housing and Land Development	The project comprises 115 hectares of greenfield land for 230 residential housing.
Te Awa Lakes Unincorporated Joint Venture	Te Awa Lakes	Waikato	Housing and Land Development	The Te Awa Lakes Project is a 90-hectare mixed use, 2,500 dwelling medium density development on land at Horotiu on the northern edge of Hamilton City.
Colliers Project Leader is the client representative for the SL1 Consortium	Southern Links 1	Waikato	Housing and Land Development	The project will comprise 48 hectares of residential development delivering 1035 units in a range of typologies and 66 hectares of land with industrial activities.
Waikato District Council	Huntly Wastewater Treatment Plant Upgrade	Waikato	Infrastructure	The project is to upgrade to the Huntly Wastewater Treatment Plant, to support its continued operation and compliance.
New Zealand Transport Agency Waka Kotahi	Hamilton Southern Links	Waikato	Infrastructure	To develop an effective network of state highway and urban arterial routes to support Hamilton's planned southern growth. It will link SH1 from Kahikatea Drive to the Waikato Expressway at Tamahere, and SH3 from Hamilton Airport to central and east Hamilton. There are 11 km of local arterials and 21 km of state highway along with associated infrastructure, activities and works.
New Zealand Transport Agency Waka Kotahi	SH1 Cambridge to Piarere Long Term Improvements Project (Cambridge to Piarere)	Waikato	Infrastructure	To develop a 16 km long four-lane expressway extending from the southern end of the Cambridge section of the Waikato Expressway to the intersection of SH1 and State Highway 29 (SH29) at Piarere.
New Zealand Transport Agency Waka Kotahi	State Highway 25 Pepe Stream Bridge Replacement	Waikato	Infrastructure	To replace the existing one-way bridge and separate footpath bridge with a new two laned bridge including a shared path. The current bridges are at 'end-of-life' and further maintenance is no longer economical.
BT Mining Limited	Rotowaro Mine Continuation Project	Waikato	Mining and Quarrying	The project seeks to complete mining at current locations and to extend mining operations into surrounding areas.
Oceana Gold (New Zealand) Limited	Waihi North Project	Waikato	Mining and Quarrying	The Waihi North project is for the staged expansion of the existing mining operations including a new underground mining operation and new open pit over multiple project sites at Wharekirauponga, Waihi North. On 18 December 2205, the Waihi North project became the first mining project to gain approval under the fast-track approvals regime.
Taharoa Ironsands Limited	Pit 1 Mining Project	Waikato	Mining and Quarrying	The Pit 1 Mining project is to establish and operate the staged development of a mine site for mineral sand extraction activities over a 23-hectare area.
Taharoa Ironsands Limited	Central and Southern Block Mining Project	Waikato	Mining and Quarrying	The Central and Southern Block project is to continue the existing mineral sand extraction activities over a 911-hectare area.
Taharoa Ironsands Limited	Northern Block Mining Project	Waikato	Mining and Quarrying	The Northern Block Mining project is to undertake mineral sand extraction activities over a 1397- hectare area (excluding Pit 1 and avoiding the urupa).
Tauhara North No. 2 Trust	Rotokawa Solar Farm	Waikato	Renewable Energy	The Rotokawa Solar Farm project is to construct and operate a solar farm and to connect and supply electricity to the national grid.
Harmony Energy NZ #6 Limited	Hinuera Solar Farm	Waikato	Renewable Energy	The Hinuera Solar Farm Project is to construct and operate a solar farm and to connect to and supply electricity to the national.
Tararua Wind Power Limited	Waikokowai Wind Farm	Waikato	Renewable Energy	The Waikokowai Wind Farm Project is to construct and operate a wind farm 10 km, and to connect to and supply electricity to the national grid.
Kaimai Wind Farm Ltd	Kaimai Wind Farm	Waikato	Renewable Energy	The Kaimai Windfarm project is to establish a wind farm on the 1,304- hectares subject site close to major users of electricity in the Auckland-Waikato-Bay of Plenty triangle, and close to Transpower's transmission line. The project involves the establishment of 24 large scale wind turbines, with 17 having a tip height of 220m, rotor diameter of 185m, and 7 having a tip height of 190m, rotor diameter of 175m across the sites.
RCL Homestead Bay Limited	Homestead Bay	Otago	Housing and Land Development	The Homestead Bay project is a residential development of 2800 residential units, subdivision, and development at the southern end of Queenstown. On 19 February, the fast-tracks approval panel approved the housing project. Infrastructure Minister Chris Bishop welcomed the project's approval, saying that the construction of new homes would boost the local economy.
NZSki Limited	Remarkables Ski Area Upgrade and Doolans Expansion	Otago	Housing and Land Development	The project is to upgrade the Remarkables existing infrastructure and expand the existing Remarkables Ski Area into the adjacent Doolans Basin in Otago.
Town Planning Group	Silver Creek	Otago	Housing and Land Development	The Silver Creek project is to provide for residential development and subdivision enabling approximately 1,050 dwelling units across a 32 hectare of urban land zoned for development.
Blackmans Creek Holdings Limited No. 1 LP	Cardrona Valley Ski Gondola and Ski Area Development	Otago	Housing and Land Development	The project is to establish on-mountain visitor accommodation, guest facilities and workers accommodation, and to establish and operate a high-speed electric passenger lift system to provide an access link from the Cardrona Valley to the Cardrona and Soho ski areas.
Coronet Village Limited (on behalf of 0to60 Properties / Rod Drury, NZSki Limited, Coronet Peak Partnership)	Coronet Village	Otago	Housing and Land Development	The project will develop a new alpine village immediately below Coronet Peak, with a new gondola providing access up to the existing Coronet Peak Ski Area, new ski area development, and supporting infrastructure. The project will comprise: a new transport hub improving access to Coronet Peak, a mountain bike facility, a restaurant at the summit of Coronet Peak, a facility for Te Tapu o Tane, a boarding high school, a primary school, a comprehensive subdivision up to 780 residential units, public roading and public wastewater infrastructure.
Mt Iron Junction Limited	Mt Iron Junction Housing Scheme	Otago	Housing and Land Development	The Mt Iron Junction Housing Scheme project is a housing project in Wanaka proposing to establish 263 high density units.
Gibbston Valley Station	Gibbston Village	Otago	Housing and Land Development	The Gibbston Village project is a residential and commercial development project, including 900dwelling units, a 2.4-hectare commercial area for day-to-day amenities, provision for a 3 hectare primary school for about 350 students and associated infrastructure.
Summerset Villages (Mosgiel) Limited	Summerset Retirement Village – Mosgiel	Otago	Housing and Land Development	The Summerset Villages – Mosgiel project is to construct and operate a comprehensive care retirement village, with 260 units on a 17-hectare project area of land.
Tory Hill Trust	Flint's Park Urban Intensification	Otago	Housing and Land Development	The project includes the construction of 501 residential dwellings in a residential neighbourhood, around the existing heritage building that will contain a Neighbourhood Mixed-Use Centre and an automated cable way to access residential development of the lower slopes of Slope Hill.
The Hills Residences Limited and The Hills Holdings Limited	The Hills Resort Development	Otago	Housing and Land Development	The project is to construct and operate a golf resort, a 18-hole championship course, and construction of resort facilities, including visitor accommodation, staff accommodation and residential activities.
Oceana Gold (New Zealand) Limited	Macraes Phase Four	Otago	Mining and Quarrying	The Macraes Phase Four (MP4) project is for the staged expansion of the existing and future open pits and underground mining operations over parts of the 13,500 hectare total site area at Golden Point Road, Macraes Flat, East Otago.
Matakanui Gold Limited (a wholly owned subsidiary of Santana Minerals Limited)	Bendigo-Ophir Gold Project	Otago	Mining and Quarrying	The Bendigo-Ophir Gold project is to establish and operate an open pit and underground gold mine on Bendigo and Ardgour Stations in Central Otago. The project completion and remediation are expected in 2065. The proposed gold mine has attracted controversy with supporters arguing it would bring jobs and economic development to the Central Otago region and environmentalists raising concerns about the environmental impact. Resources Minister Shane Jones and Dunedin businessman Sir Ian Taylor have also agreed to debate the merits of the Bendigo gold mine during a debate in Dunedin scheduled for 8 April 2026. Despite initially accepting, Jones pulled out of the debate less than two weeks before the scheduled date. On 13 March, the fast-track expert panel sought submissions on the Santana Bendigo-Ophir mine from several environmental and industry groups including Forest & Bird, the Environmental Defence Society (EDS), Sustainable Tarras, the Otago Conservation Board, the New Zealand Minerals Council, Queenstown Business Chamber of Commerce and the Santana Mine Supporters Group. By mid-April 2026, the expert panel had received 80 requests for information and 100 testimonies, with Matakanui Gold expected to respond by 17 April. On 16 August, the South Island iwi (tribe) Ngāi Tahu's legal team had called for Santana's Bendigo fast-track application to be rejected on the grounds that the company had failed to adequately consult with the tribe, which they argued violated both the Ngāi Tahu Treaty Settlement Act and section 7 of the Fast-track Approvals Act 2024. On 22 April Santana's chairman Peter Cook alleged that Ngāi Tahu had demanded an NZ$180 million payout if the Bendigo project was approved. In response, Ngāi Tahu's leadership body "Kā Rūnaka" disputed Cook's and accused the company of breaching trust. Former Attorney-General Chris Finlayson KC expressed concern that Santana's failure to adequately consult with Ngāi Tahu could cause the company to run afoul of the New Zealand court system. The fast-track approvals panel held hearings on the Bendigo-Ophir application at Ōtākou Marae in the Otago peninsula and Cromwell between 28 April and 1 May. Several parties including Kā Rūnaka, the Otago Regional Council, Central Otago District Council, Department of Conservation, Environmental Defence Society, the New Zealand Fish & Games Council, the Otago Fish & Game Council, Forest & Bird, the Central Otago Winegrowers Association, Sustainable Tarras retired psychologist Claire Fletcher-Flinn and retired University of Otago tourism Professor Geoff Kearsley opposed the proposed gold mine on indigenous rights, ecological, biodiversity and heritage grounds. Bill Sanders of the Santana Mine Supporters Group argued for the gold mine to be approved, asserting that a survey the group conducted showed that the majority of locals supported the mine on the grounds it would bring jobs to the area. In early June 2026, Santana retracted its earlier claim that Ngāi Tahu had sought a $180 million payout, stating that the local iwi had never made any financial demands. On 25 June, Santana temporarily paused its fast-track application in order to provide additional information and report in support of its open pit gold mining application.
Tararua Wind Power Limited (a wholly owned subsidiary of Mercury Wind Limited, which itself is a wholly owned subsidiary of Mercury NZ Limited)	Mahinerangi Wind Farm	Otago	Renewable Energy	The Mahinerangi Wind Farm project proposes to expand its current operation by constructing additional wind turbines, to connect and supply electricity to the national grid.
Lochindorb Wind Limited Partnership	Kaihiku Wind Farm	Otago	Renewable Energy	The Kaihiku Wind Farm project is to construct and operate a wind farm that covers the ridgelines and hilltops of over a project area of 2000-hectares across ten properties halfway between Balclutha and Clinton in the Kaikihu Range, and to connect and supply electricity to the national grid.
Sanford Limited	Project East	Otago	Aquaculture and farming	The Project East project is to establish and operate two open ocean salmon farming areas, with each farming area being approximately 20 hectares.
Winton Capital Limited	Ayrburn Screen Hub	Otago	Film infrastructure	The Ayrburn Screen Hub project is to establish a 26-hectare film and television production facility including studios and workers' accommodation between Arrowtown and Lake Hayes. On 17 March 2026, the project was approved by a fast-track panel despite local opposition.
Foresta (NZ) Limited	Foresta – Kawerau – Stage 1 – Pine Chemicals and Wood Pellet Plant	Bay of Plenty	Housing and Land Development	The Foresta – Kawerau – Stage 1 – Pine Chemicals and Wood Pellet Plant project is to construct and operate a pine chemical and wood pellet plant on a 9.5 hectare site near Kawerau.
Bell Road Limited Partnership	Wairakei South	Bay of Plenty	Housing and Land Development	To develop between 123 – 340 hectares of rural land near Papamoa, for residential, commercial and industrial uses. If the full site is developed, the project will comprise 2,000–3,000 new homes and 60–80 hectares of new industrial land, covering 153 hectares.
Tauriko Property Group Limited Partnership	Tauriko West by Tauriko Property Group	Bay of Plenty	Housing and Land Development	To develop between 132 hectares of Rural zoned land at Tauriko for residential use, with approximately 1,250 homes.
Ngā Pōtiki a Tamapahore Trust	Tara Road Development	Bay of Plenty	Housing and Land Development	The project will include 605 residential allotments, and a 2.5-hectare commercial precinct.
Port of Tauranga Limited	Stella Passage Development	Bay of Plenty	Infrastructure	The project is for extension of the Sulphur Point (stage one) and Mount Maunganui wharves (stage two), and to carry out the associated reclamation and dredging of the sea bed.
New Zealand Transport Agency Waka Kotahi	Takitimu North Link Stage 2	Bay of Plenty	Infrastructure	To construct a four-lane, median-divided highway to replace the existing SH2 corridor between Te Puna and Ōmokoroa. This project is an extension of Takitimu North Link Stage One, which is currently under construction and will link Tauranga and Te Puna.
Port of Tauranga Limited	Capital and Maintenance Dredging Reconsenting Project	Bay of Plenty	Infrastructure	The project is to remove dredging material from the coastal marine area to deepen, widen and maintain the navigation channels of the Port of Tauranga.
New Zealand Transport Agency Waka Kotahi	SH29 Tauriko Network Connections (including Omanawa Bridge replacement)	Bay of Plenty	Infrastructure	To develop SH29 and SH29A which form part of the key 'Golden Triangle' connection, including to the Port of Tauranga. The Omanawa Bridge is scheduled to be replaced in 2024–2027.
Te Rāhui Herenga Waka Limited Partnership	Te Rāhui Land Fill Project	Bay of Plenty	Infrastructure	The Te Rāhui Land Fill project is to establish multiple disposal sites for the deposit of excavated material from the previously consented Te Rāhui Herenga Waka Whakatāne – Whakatāne Boat Harbour project site.
Katikati Quarries (2001) Ltd	Katikati Quarry Expansion	Bay of Plenty	Mining and Quarrying	The Katikati Quarry Expansion Project is to expand the existing quarry by 50 hectares within both their own property boundaries, as well as into adjacent Crown land. The project will comprise development of the quarry expansion area into an operational quarry and construction of new access roads, infrastructure and ancillary buildings.
Manawa Energy Limited	Kaimai Hydro-Electric Power Scheme Re-Consenting	Bay of Plenty	Renewable Energy	The Kaimai Hydro-Electric Power Scheme project is to reconsent Manawa Energy Ltd.'s existing Kaimai Hydro Electric Power Scheme.
Manawa Energy Limited	Wheao Hydro-Electric Power Scheme Re-Consenting	Bay of Plenty	Renewable Energy	The Wheao Hydro-Electric Power Scheme Re-Consenting project is to reconsent Manawa Energy Ltd's existing Wheao Hydro-Electric Power Scheme. The scheme's existing consents under the RMA are due to expire at various times through 2026.
The Wellington Company Limited	New Central Park	Wellington	Housing and Land Development	To extend the Paraparaumu Town Centre, to provide a master-planned mix of activities, including approximately 1,800 residential properties, commercial, large format retail, tourism (jobs/identity), mixed use and aged care residential activities.
Guildford Timber Company Ltd	Silverstream Forest Development	Wellington	Housing and Land Development	To develop 330 hectares of land in Upper Hutt, to create 1500–2040 new homes across 5 district neighbourhood areas within a natural forest environment.
Waikanae North Developments Limited	Waikanae North Developments	Wellington	Housing and Land Development	To establish a master-planned urban development comprising: over 1000 residential dwellings of diverse typologies, a local centre and capacity for complementary activities such as a retirement village and a school.
The Wellington Company Limited	Ōtaki Māori Racing Club (OMRC) Development	Wellington	Housing and Land Development	The Ōtaki Māori Racing Club Development project is to construct a mixed use development (including 550 residential units) over a 20.3 hectare project area within a 59.8 hectare site near Ōtaki, Wellington.
KM and MG Holdings Limited	Plimmerton Farm	Wellington	Housing and Land Development	To deliver approximately 2,400 allotments/houses, that would be accompanied by a commercial area, retirement village, and a school, across a network of public spaces within and adjacent to large tracts of restored and enhanced native vegetation, high value wetlands and streams.
Classic Group	Mt Welcome, Pukerua Bay, Porirua	Wellington	Housing and Land Development	The Mt Welcome, Pukerua Bay, Porirua project is to construct 900 houses and accompanying infrastructure over 10 years.
Wellington International Airport Limited	Wellington International Airport Southern Seawall Renewal	Wellington	Infrastructure	The Wellington International Airport Southern Seawall Renewal project is to replace and upgrade the existing seawall at the southern end of the runway at Wellington Airport.
New Zealand Transport Agency Waka Kotahi	State Highway 1 Wellington Improvements	Wellington	Infrastructure	To improve SH1 between the Terrace Tunnel and Kilbirnie, primarily from a second Mt Victoria Tunnel and Basin Reserve improvements, or a long tunnel that bypasses the central city.
Transpower New Zealand Limited	Central Park Resilience Project	Wellington	Infrastructure	The project is to develop a secondary indoor substation in proximity to the Central Park Substation with line connections to the existing substation and line.
Transpower New Zealand Ltd	High Voltage Direct Current (HVDC) Cable Replacement and Capacity Project	Wellington	Infrastructure	The High Voltage Direct Current (HVDC) Cable Replacement and Capacity Project is to upgrade the HVDC inter-island transmission link (HVDC link) and replace the undersea cables that connect the North Island and South Island of New Zealand.
Winstone Aggregates (a Division of Fletcher Concrete & Infrastructure Ltd)	Belmont Quarry Development	Wellington	Mining and Quarrying	To establish a new overburden disposal area adjacent to the existing quarry.
Te Runanga o Ngai Takoto	NgaiTakoto Fast Track Projects	Northland	Housing and Land Development	The NgaiTakoto Fast Track project is to enhance the economic, environmental, social and cultural interests of NgaiTatoko through the development of multiple sites for housing (140 residential units), water storage and campsite redevelopment in the Far North of Northland.
Te Hau Ora O Ngapuhi Limited	Bisset Road	Northland	Housing and Land Development	The Bisset Road project is to provide a 100-unit housing development of one-, two- and three- bedroom options in order to provide affordable rental, community housing, Papakainga and affordable units for sale north of Kaikohe.
Northport Ltd	Northport Container Terminal Expansion	Northland	Infrastructure	The project is to expand the existing Northport facility. Specifically, the project will comprise: reclaiming approximately 11.7 hectares of coastal marine area for a proposed new berth and container terminal; extending the existing wharf 250m along the face of the proposed reclamation; approximately 1.72 million cubic metres of capital dredging, and associated maintenance dredging, within the harbour to enable vessel access to the expanded terminal.
New Zealand Transport Agency Waka Kotahi	SH1 Whangārei to Port Marsden Highway	Northland	Infrastructure	To upgrade 22 km of SH1 to four lanes between Whangārei and SH15 (Port Marsden Highway), including upgrade of the SH1/SH15 intersection. The designation for SH1 requires alteration.
New Zealand Transport Agency Waka Kotahi	Alternative to the Brynderwyns Hills	Northland	Infrastructure	To plan, design and deliver an alternative to the current SH1 Brynderwyn Hills route, to reduce travel times, improve safety, boost capacity and economic growth and build greater resilience between Auckland and Northland.
Ministry of Business, Innovation and Employment	Shipyard and Drydock Facility Project	Northland	Infrastructure	The Shipyard and Dry Dock Facility project is to develop and operate a marine maintenance operations facility capable of servicing New Zealand's largest current and planned vessels including service of international vessels and navy vessels at Northport, Marsden Point, Whangārei in the Northland Region. The project will comprise dredging and reclamation, a 250m length floating drydock and, a permanent maritime maintenance facility.
Far North District Council	The Kaikohe Wastewater Treatment Plant Renewal	Northland	Infrastructure	The Kaikohe Wastewater Treatment Plant Renewal project is to resolve noncompliance issues and improve the treatment process at the Kaikohe Wastewater Treatment Plant. It will provide adequate wastewater infrastructure to enable planned affordable housing developments.
KiwiRail Holdings Limited	Marsden Point Rail Link	Northland	Infrastructure	The Marsden Point Rail Link project is to construct the connection and operate a rail link corridor extending from the North Auckland line at Oakleigh via Mata Hill, along the Ruakaka River out to Northport, at Marsden Point. The link will extend 19 km.
Lake Ōmāpere Trust	The Lake Ōmāpere Restoration Project	Northland	Infrastructure	The Lake Ōmāpere Restoration project seeks to restore the mauri and water quality of Lake Ōmāpere and provide for the long-term sustainable use of the lake for the benefit of Ngāpuhi through dredging, wetland construction and water level management.
McCallum Brothers Limited	Bream Bay Sand Extraction Project	Northland	Mining and Quarrying	Undertake sand extraction over a proposed 35-year term of consent. On 25 October 2025, 485 people affiliated with the Bream Bay Guardians built sand castles and other sand sculptures to protest the fast-tracked sand mining proposal.
Te Aupouri Fisheries Management Ltd	Muriwhenua Aquaculture	Northland	Aquaculture and farming	The Muriwhenua Aquaculture project is to develop nine marine farms.
Kingsgate Holdings Limited	Kingsgate – Oriana Reserve	Manawatū-Whanganui	Housing and Land Development	The Kingsgate – Oriana Reserve project is to construct 93 to 97 residential houses for the first home or downsized market within the suburb of Highbury.
Mercury NZ Limited	Tararua Wind Farm Repowering Project	Manawatū-Whanganui	Renewable Energy	The Tararua Wind Farm Repowering Project is to disestablish 134 existing wind turbines and install 43 new turbines approximately 180 metres.
Mercury NZ Limited	Puketoi Wind Farm	Manawatū-Whanganui	Renewable Energy	The Puketoi Wind Farm (PWF) project is to construct and operate a 53-turbine wind farm development on private land along the top of the Puketoi Range near Pahiatua. The PWF would connect to existing grid infrastructure via a new 37 km 220kV transmission line.
SolarGen Joint Venture	Foxton Solar Farm	Manawatū-Whanganui	Renewable Energy	The Foxton Solar Project is to construct and operate a solar farm on a 400-hectare site, and to connect to and supply electricity to the national grid.
Manawa Energy Limited	Huriwaka Wind Farm	Manawatū-Whanganui	Renewable Energy	The Huriwaka Wind Farm project is to construct and operate a wind farm to increase the renewable generation of electricity in the Manawatū-Whanganui region.
Harmony Energy NZ #5 Limited	Bunnythorpe Solar Farm	Manawatū-Whanganui	Renewable Energy	The Bunnythorpe Solar Farm project is to construct and operate a solar farm and to connect to and supply electricity to the national grid.
Mana Ahuriri Holdings Limited Partnership, wholly owned subsidiary and commercial holdings company of Mana Ahuriri Trust, the post Treaty Settlement entity for Mana Ahuriri.	Ahuriri Station	Hawkes Bay	Housing and Land Development	The project will develop an integrated resilient Green Communities commercial and industrial business park (circa 380 hectares), 1,000 plus houses as an extension to Bayview, the creation of ecological parks, and the preservation and enhancement of key cultural landmarks and features, connected to the regional airport, port and state highway and rail corridor.
CDL Land New Zealand Limited	Arataki	Hawkes Bay	Housing and Land Development	The Arataki project is to develop and deliver a residential subdivision capable of yielding between approximately 157 – 202 residential units of varying densities and typologies, with associated parks/walkways, roading and 3 waters infrastructure on approximately 11 hectares of land at Arataki (Havelock North).
New Zealand Transport Agency Waka Kotahi	Hawke's Bay Expressway	Hawkes Bay	Infrastructure	To develop an efficient and reliable connection between Napier and Hastings, that also improves resilience, capacity and safety. An additional lane will be added in each direction over 24 km to create four lanes within the existing state highway corridor. It includes 3–5 interchanges and 3–4 bridge upgrades between Watchman Road and Pakipaki.
Tukituki Water Security Project	Tukituki Water Security Project	Hawkes Bay	Infrastructure	Formerly known as the Ruataniwha Water Storage Scheme, the project seeks to dam the Makaroro River to recreate a water storage reservoir, to enable regional water security and sustainability.
Napier City Council	Taradale and Awatoto Borefields/Water Treatment Plants	Hawkes Bay	Infrastructure	The project is to increase the capacity at existing bore field sites to improve supply, quality and resilience of the municipal water network and will comprise: Drilling up to three new bores at each site (one each as contingency), to deliver up to 500 litres per second at each site; decommissioning existing bores and improvements to the water treatment plants.
Eastland Generation Ltd	Waihi Hydroelectric Power Scheme Reconsenting	Hawkes Bay	Renewable Energy	The Waihi Hydroelectric Power Scheme Reconsenting project is to continue the use, operations and maintenance of the hydro scheme. The scheme will maintain the existing connection and supply of electricity to the national grid.
Te Runanga o Ngati Waewae	Arahura Papakāinga Housing Project	West Coast	Housing and Land Development	The Arahura Papakāinga Housing project will enable the development of Papakāinga by Te Rūnanga o Ngāti Waewae beside their Marae.
Bathurst Resources Limited/BT Mining Limited/Buller Coal Ltd/Bathurst Coal Ltd	Buller Plateaux Continuation Project	West Coast	Mining and Quarrying	The Buller Plateaux Continuation project will expand the existing mining site on the Buller Coal Plateaux. It will utilise existing infrastructure facilities at Stockton mine to support and extend the mine life of the current Stockton Operations.
TiGa Minerals and Metals Limited	Barrytown Mineral Sands Project	West Coast	Mining and Quarrying	The Barrytown Mineral Sands project will establish and operate the staged development of mine sites for mineral sand extraction activities including processing over an approximate 635-hectare total site area.
Westpower Limited	Waitaha Hydro Project	West Coast	Renewable Energy	The project will provide renewable energy equivalent to providing electricity to approximately 12,000 households.
Maia Properties Limited	Maia Properties – Mangorei Road Development	Taranaki	Housing and Land Development	The Maia Properties – Mangorei Road Development project is to develop 119 allotments for residential housing on Mangorei Road.
Stratford Park Limited	Stratford Park	Taranaki	Housing and Land Development	Stratford Park is a project to develop a multi-use complex to host A&P shows, motorsports, and equestrian events. Stratford Park will also provide community and education facilities, parks, and walkways.
Trans-Tasman Resources Limited	Taranaki VTM Project	Taranaki	Mining and Quarrying	The Taranaki VTM project is to extract up to 50 million tonnes (Mt) of seabed material per year from the Project Area. On 5 February 2026, the fast-track approvals panel issued a draft decision declining TTR's application, citing credible risks to local fauna and concerns about sediment plume and noise levels. A final decision is expected on 18 March 2026. On 19 February, the company withdrew its fast-track application to mine the South Taranaki Bight's seabed.
Harmony Energy NZ #8 Limited	Huirangi Solar Farm	Taranaki	Renewable Energy	The Huirangi Solar Farm project is to construct and operate a solar farm and to connect to and supply electricity to the national grid.
Invercargill City Council	Alternate Water Supply Project	Southland	Infrastructure	The Awarua Alternate Water Supply project will provide a standalone, reliable, secondary water source for the 55,000 residents and businesses of Invercargill from groundwater bores, capable of providing approximately 20 million litres of additional treated water per day.
Sanford Limited	Makarewa Hatchery	Southland	Aquaculture and farming	The Makarewa Hatchery project is to construct and operate a land-based recirculating water salmon hatchery on a 24-hectare former abattoir site.
Ngāi Tahu Seafood Resources Limited	Hananui Aquaculture Project	Southland	Aquaculture and farming	The Hananui Aquaculture Project is to develop an approximately 2,500 hectares site of marine space for marine farming (finfish).
ImpactMarine Bluff Limited	Impact Marine: Sustainable and Climate-Resilient Aquaculture on Land in Southland	Southland	Aquaculture and farming	The Impact Marine Land-based Salmon Farm Project is to construct and operate a salmon farm and processing facility on land.
CKSV Māpua Limited Partnership	The Māpua Development	Tasman	Housing and Land Development	The Māpua Development project is for a mixed-density residential and community development. This will comprise approximately 320 residential lots, a recreation reserve (including sports fields and courts), community amenities building and parking, an extensive wetland and restoration of the Seaton Valley stream.
CCKV Maitai Dev Co LP	Maitahi Village	Nelson	Housing and Land Development	The Maitahi Village project is a community (focussed) development including residential, retirement and commercial activities. These include: 180 new residential allotments (300m2 – 1,100 m2), of which 50 have been earmarked for Iwi led housing (Ngāti Koata); a planned commercial centre including cornerstone Koata House; a comprehensive care retirement village containing approximately 194 townhouses plus 36 in-care facility units, a clubhouse and a pavilion.
New Zealand Transport Agency Waka Kotahi	Hope Bypass	Tasman	Infrastructure	To construct 4.2 km of new highway to bypass Richmond and Hope townships to reduce congestion in Richmond, increase efficiency and travel time reliability and allow for more housing growth.
New Zealand Transport Agency Waka Kotahi	End of Life Bridges Programme	Nationwide	Infrastructure	To replace eight high priority state highway bridges that are in an 'end of life' condition. These bridges have structural issues and risks, and it is more economically viable to replace them than to continue maintenance.
KiwiRail Holdings Limited	Lower North Island Integrated Rail Mobility and PBC stage RS4.3	Multi-region	Infrastructure	Island Integrated Rail Mobility (LNIRIM) and PBC stage RS4.3 projects are to undertake upgrades to the existing rail network on the Wairarapa Line between Wellington and Masterton, and on the North Island Main Trunk Line between Wellington and Palmerston North, to enable interregional rail services to operate with improved connectivity, access and capacity opportunities, and increased efficiencies of service.
Gisborne District Council	Tokomaru Bay Legacy Landfill Contaminated Land Remediation Project	Gisborne	Infrastructure	The project will comprise removal of the historic contaminated landfill, and the site will be remediated and returned to its original floodplain state.
Clifford Bay Marine Farms Limited	Clifford Bay Marine Farm – Innovation and Productivity	Marlborough	Aquaculture and farming	The Clifford Bay Marine Farm – Innovation and Productivity project seeks to renew the consent for and realign to operate the 424.571 hectares Clifford Bay mussel farm to enable a shift away from the coast and into deeper water and to allow for new innovative marine farming technologies to be deployed to optimise farming logistics and productivity. This will include installation of submerged longline farm structures (up to 250 longlines) and screw anchors.
