= SS James Cosgrove =

Minesweeper and fishing trawler, 1918–1952

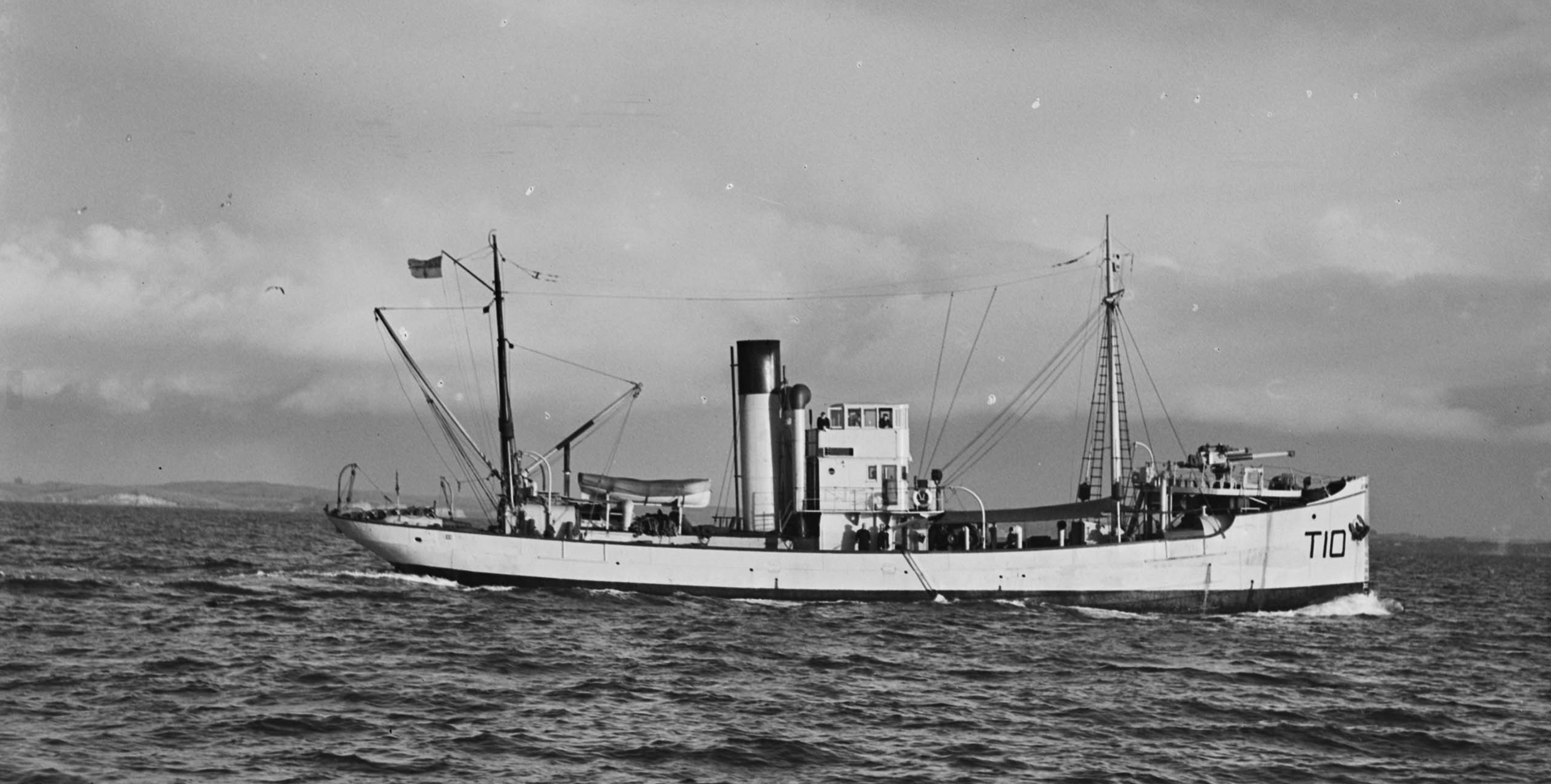
- James Cosgrove as a minesweeper during World War II

History

United Kingdom
- Name: James Cosgrove
- Builder: Ailsa Shipbuilding Company, Aymanr, Ayrshire.
- Launched: 1918
- Fate: Sold to Sanford LTD in 1920

New Zealand
- Name: James Cosgrove
- Owner: 1920–1939 Sanford Ltd 1939-1951 Royal New Zealand Navy
- In service: 1920
- Out of service: 1939
- Identification: Pennant numbers AK1295, 6, T10
- Fate: Broken up at the Viaduct Basin, Auckland. Hulk sunk at sea 1952.

General characteristics
- Class & type: Castle-class trawler
- Length: 125.6 ft (38.3 m)
- Beam: 23.5 ft (7.2 m)
- Draft: 12.85 ft (3.92 m)
- Crew: 10

SS James Cosgrove was a Castle-class trawler built for the United Kingdom for use as a minesweeper. She was purchased by Sanford Ltd in 1920 for use in New Zealand as a fishing trawler, being used as a minesweeper again during World War II. She was scrapped at the Western Viaduct in the 1950s, with her hulk being sunk in 1952.

== Early operational history ==
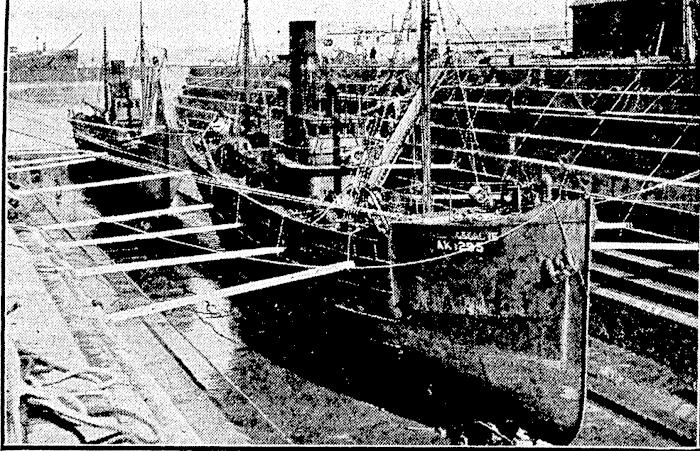
Thomas Currell (centre / right) and James Cosgrove (left) in Calliope Drydock, Devonport, New Zealand.

James Cosgrove was built by the Ailsa Shipbuilding Company, located in Ayr, for use as a minesweeper, being converted into a fishing trawler after World War I had ended. She was purchased by Sanford in 1920 and sailed to Auckland from Glasgow in May 1920, arriving at Auckland on 2 July 1920. In March 1928, James Cosgrove was mistaken to have been in distress after the inspector of police in Napier received a call about the vessel, which appeared to be in trouble four miles (6.4 km) offshore, later seen steaming south. Once James Cosgrove arrived back in Auckland a few days later, the officers stated that there were no grounds whatever for the reports that she was in distress, with the probable explanation that the locals were unfamiliar with trawling and mistook it as the ship breaking down. On 24 May 1936 the cook of James Cosgrove disappeared from the vessel while she was trawling in the Bay of Plenty. James Cosgrove would turn back and would retrace the ship's course for an hour, also searching the entire ship, but the cook was never found. It is likely that he fell overboard.

== World War II ==
Within a day of war being declared against Germany on 3 September 1939, the Marine Department would requisition James Cosgrove along with the other Sanford trawlers, Thomas Currell, and Humphrey, which would be converted for minesweeping duties and fitted with 4-inch guns, depth charges, and minesweeping equipment, also being given a wireless telephone and telegraph equipment. James Cosgrove would be commissioned on 10 October 1939, being the first of the Sanford trawlers to be commissioned. On 28 February 1940, James Cosgrove would be towed back to Auckland by Humphrey after a serious engine fault. On the morning of 19 June 1940, a distress signal was received from the passenger ship RMS Niagara, reporting it had struck a naval mine between Bream Head, and the Moko Hinau Islands and was sinking. James Cosgrove and Thomas Currell were ordered to sea, steaming at full speed towards her, arriving at 12:50 PM with minesweeping gear being deployed at 2:48 PM. She and Thomas Currell discovered two contact mines that been laid recently, both were destroyed by rifle fire. In December 1943, James Cosgrove was found to have major boiler faults and was immediately withdrawn for disposal.

== Post war ==
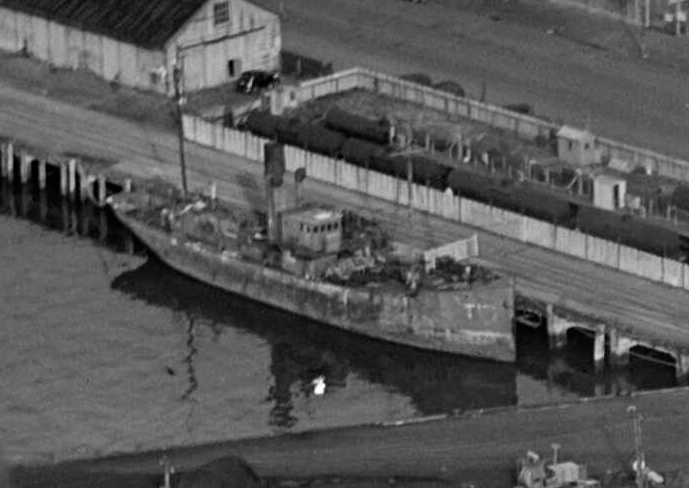
James Cosgrove laid up at the Viaduct Basin, 1949

After World War II, James Cosgrove was offered back to Sanford Ltd, but because of her age, the cost of conversion, and that she was a heavy coal burner (11-12 tons daily) the company never took up ownership of the trawler. Instead, she was laid up at the Viaduct Basin until the 1950s, when she was sold for scrap in 1951, with her hulk being towed to sea to be sunk. But a later report in June 1961, the Marine Department advised the Coromandel Country Council that the submerged hulk of James Cosgrove would need to be removed as it was near the Coromandel wharf, being a danger to navigation. As she had been placed there as part of proposed harbor works years earlier, being filled with concrete.
