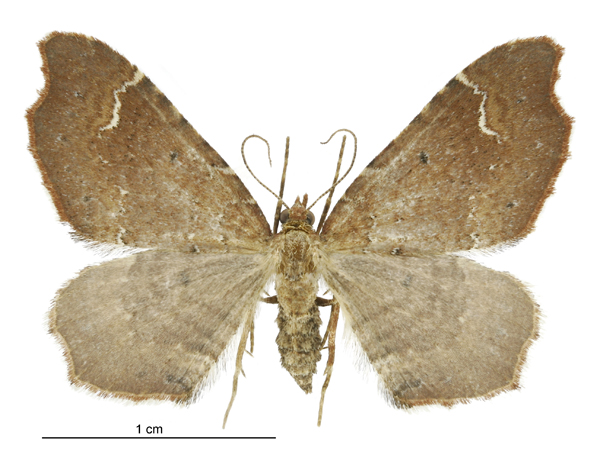
- Female
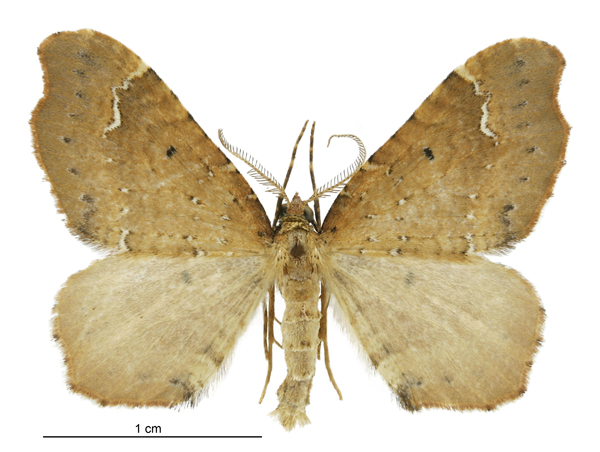
- Male

Scientific classification
- Kingdom: Animalia
- Phylum: Arthropoda
- Clade: Pancrustacea
- Class: Insecta
- Order: Lepidoptera
- Family: Geometridae
- Genus: Asaphodes
- Species: A. camelias

Binomial name
- Asaphodes camelias (Meyrick, 1888)

Synonyms
- Larentia camelias Meyrick, 1888; Xanthorhoe camelias (Meyrick, 1888)

= Asaphodes camelias =

Species of moth, endemic to New Zealand

Asaphodes camelias is a species of moth in the family Geometridae. It is endemic to New Zealand, has been observed in both the North and South Islands and inhabits native forest. The adults of this species are on the wing from February to May and July to September.

== Taxonomy ==
This species was first described by Edward Meyrick in 1888 as Larentia camelias using a male specimen collected at the Whangārei Heads in December. George Hudson discussed this species in his 1898 book under the name Xanthorhoe camelias and again, as well as illustrating the species, in his 1928 publication. In 1971 J. S. Dugdale placed this species in the genus Asaphodes. This placement was affirmed by Dugdale in 1988. The male holotype specimen is held at the Natural History Museum, London.

== Description ==
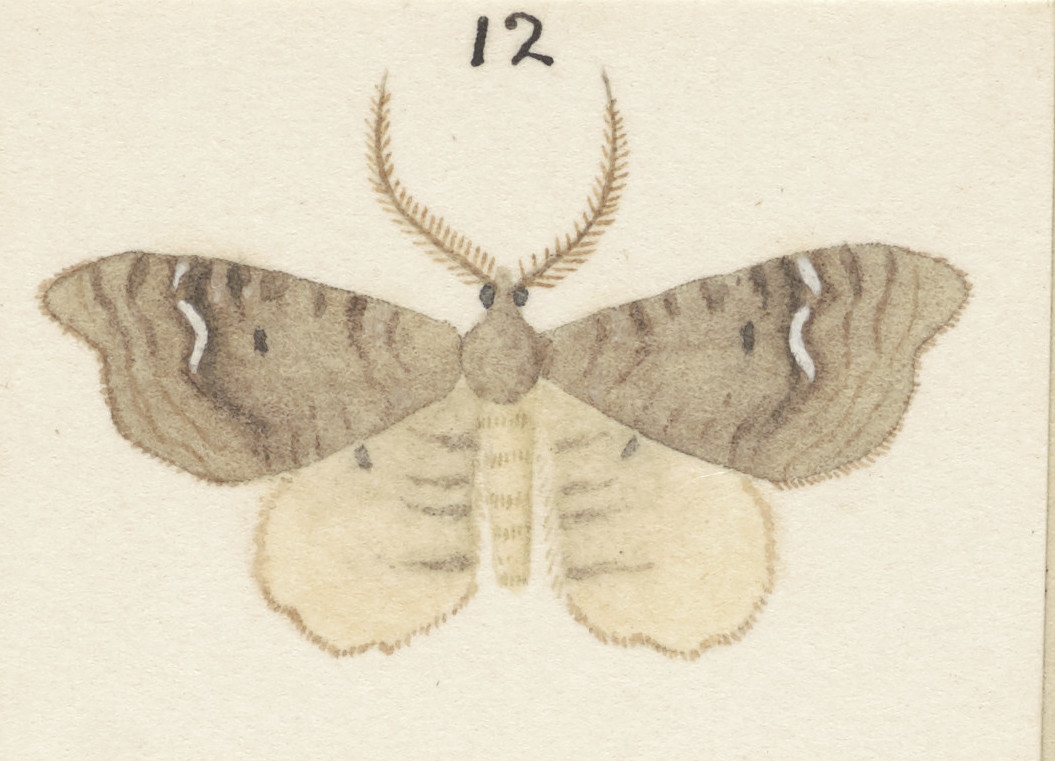
Illustration of a male A. camelias by George Hudson.

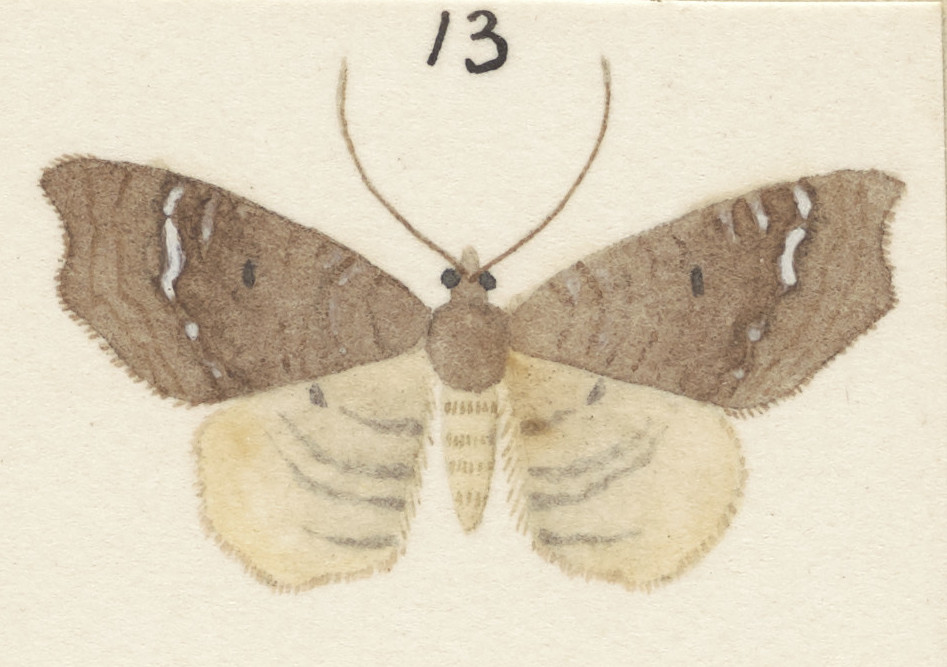
Illustration of a female A. camelias by George Hudson.

Meyrick described this species as follows:

Male. — 23 mm. Head, antennae, and thorax whitish-ochreous, greyish-tinged, with a few dark fuscous scales. Palpi fuscous. Abdomen whitish-ochreous, with a double dorsal series of dark fuscous dots. Legs whitish-ochreous, irrorated with purple-reddish and dark fuscous. Forewings with costa rather sinuate in middle, on anterior half gently, on posterior half very strongly arched, hindmargin moderately sinuate below apex, bowed in middle; light greyish-ochreous, with numerous cloudy waved brown-grey transverse lines, somewhat bent near costa; a black discal dot; margin of basal patch and anterior edge of median band indicated by series of very minute white dots, preceded and followed by black points; posterior edge of median band marked by a darker line, followed by a fine white line reduced on lower half to a series of points; subterminal line represented by four cloudy blackish dots on upper half and another above anal angle : cilia greyish-ochreous (imperfect). Hindwings fuscous-whitish; a median band of four cloudy greyish lines, bent near costa; a cloudy grey spot above anal angle; cilia fuscous-whitish (imperfect).

== Distribution ==
This species is endemic to New Zealand. Specimens of this species have been collected in the southern North Island hill country, as well as near the Waitaha River and at Paroa, both in the South Island. A. camelias is regarded a typical species of the West Coast region.

== Behaviour ==
The adults of this species are on the wing from February to May and July to September.

== Habitat ==
This species inhabits native forest.
