= Fast-track Approvals Act 2024 =

Act of Parliament in New Zealand

New Zealand Parliament
- Royal assent: 23 December 2024

Legislative history
- Introduced by: Chris Bishop
- First reading: 7 March 2024
- Second reading: 13 November 2024
- Third reading: 17 December 2024
- Status: Current legislation

The Fast-track Approvals Act 2024 is a New Zealand Act of Parliament that seeks to establish a permanent fast track approvals regime for a range of infrastructure, housing and development projects. The Bill is part of the National-led coalition government's efforts to overhaul resource management legislation. The Bill was first introduced into the New Zealand Parliament on 7 March 2024.

The Fast-track Approvals Bill was part of New Zealand First's coalition agreement with the incumbent National Party. The Bill has received support from business interests including BusinessNZ, Energy Resources Aotearoa and Foodstuffs. It has also attracted criticism from the opposition Labour, Green parties and Te Pāti Māori as well as environmentalist groups including Greenpeace Aotearoa New Zealand and the Environmental Defence Society. The Fast-track legislation also attracted several nationwide protests. The bill passed its third reading on 17 December 2024 along party lines, with the government coalition parties supporting the bill and the left-wing opposition parties opposing it. It received royal assent on 23 December 2024.

== Provisions ==
=== Fast-track approvals process ===
The Fast-track Approvals Bill proposes to establish a permanent fast-track approvals regime for projects of national and regional significance in New Zealand. The regime's process involves several joint ministers including the Minister for Infrastructure, Minister of Transport, Minister for Regional Development, Minister of Conservation, and the Minister Responsible for the Crown Minerals Act.

First, companies and other groups would apply to the Government for their projects to be fast-tracked.

Second, the Infrastructure Minister would assess the application against a set of criteria and then decide whether to refer the project for assessment to an expert panel. The application must include information about prior decisions by other approving authorities including court decisions. The Infrastructure Minister is also required to consult with the Environment Minister and other relevant ministers. The Infrastructure Minister has the power to decline the project at this stage. An earlier draft version had proposed splitting the decision-making process among the Infrastructure, Transport and Regional Development Ministers.

Third, the independent panel will consult with the applicant and directly affected parties, and can choose to approve or decline the project. Even if a project is approved, it may have to comply with certain conditions including protecting the environment and mitigating damage caused by the project.

An earlier version of the bill had given Ministers the power to approve projects but was removed during the Select Committee stage. Ministerial approval had been a point of contention for opponents of the fast-track approvals legislation, particularly environmental groups who have expressed concern that the legislation allows ministers to overrule the expert panels' recommendations.

=== Eligibility criteria ===
The Fast-track Approvals legislation would allow applicants to bypass the usual consenting process and gain an exemption or approval from various laws including the Resource Management Act 1991, Conservation Act 1987, Wildlife Act 1953, Reserves Act 1977, Freshwater Fisheries Regulations 1983, Heritage New Zealand Pouhere Taonga Act 2014, Exclusive Economic Zone and Continental Shelf (Environmental Effects) Act 2012, land access under Crown Minerals Act 1991, Public Works Act 1981 and Fisheries Act 1996.

The Bill also outlines the criteria for both "eligible" and "ineligible" projects. Eligible projects must have significant national or local benefits including delivering significant economic benefits, supporting industries, the development of natural resources and climate change mitigation, and addressing environmental issues. Ineligible projects are activities that occur on land returned under a Treaty of Waitangi settlement, that has been contested by the land owner, Māori customary land and reservations, a protected customary rights area, aquaculture areas protected by iwi settlements and Section 12 of the Māori Commercial Aquaculture Claims Settlement Act 2004, and open ocean projects prohibited by international law. Heritage New Zealand must also be consulted on archaeological decisions.

=== Expert panels ===
The Bill outlines the purpose, functions and composition of "expert panels." Panels have a quorum of four members and must include one person nominated by relevant local authorities and one person nominated by relevant iwi (tribal) authorities. An expert panel consists of a former High Court or Environment Court judge serving as a "convener", a lawyer or planner as a "chairperson," a local authority representative, an environment expert, an iwi/tribal authority representative in cases involving Treaty of Waitangi settlements, and someone with Māori development and te ao Māori (Māori worldview) expertise.

The panel will consult the applicant and "directly-affected parties" such as relevant ministers, local councils, landowners, occupiers and requiring authorities on or adjacent to the land, and other parties considered relevant by the panel. While an earlier version of the legislation had given a six months consultation timeframe, this was extended following the select committee stage to allow more directly-affected parties to participate.

== Background ==
Following the 2023 New Zealand general election, the National Party formed a coalition with the ACT and New Zealand First parties. As part of National's coalition agreement with NZ First, the Sixth National Government agreed to establish a new fast-track consenting regime to "improve the speed and process for resource approvals for major infrastructure projects, unlocking opportunities in industries such as aquaculture and mining in our region."

Members of the National-led coalition government have advocated the Fast-track approvals Bill due to their frustration with environmental protections for delaying or obstructing several major infrastructure projects. The Regional Development Minister Shane Jones said "Gone are the days of the multicoloured skink, the kiwi, many other species that have been weaponised to deny regional New Zealand communities their right to a livelihood, their entitlement to live peacefully with their environment but derive an income to meet the costs of raising families in regional New Zealand." In response to concerns that mining in the Ruataniwha plains would affect the endangered Archey's frog, Jones had said "if there is a mining opportunity and it's impeded by a blind frog, goodbye, Freddy."

In March 2024, Transport Minister Simeon Brown had announced that the proposed fast-track approvals legislation would help facilitate the Government's stated goal of building 15 "Roads of National Significance." Similarly, Infrastructure New Zealand chief executive Nick Leggett stated that "fast-tracking roading projects could save significant up-front costs and give communities benefits sooner."

== Legislative passage ==
=== First reading ===
The Fast-track Approvals Bill was first introduced into the New Zealand Parliament on 7 March 2024. During the first debate National Party MP and Minister for RMA Reform Chris Bishop, ACT Party MP Simon Court, Minister for Resources Shane Jones and Associate Housing Minister Tama Potaka gave speeches arguing that Bill would eliminate red tape and ease the process for building essential infrastructure such as road, housing, public transportation, mines and renewable energy. By contrast, opposition Labour MPs Rachel Brooking, Green co-leader James Shaw and Te Pāti Māori co-leader Debbie Ngarewa-Packer criticised the Bill for eliminating environmental protections, increasing the risk of pollution and climate change and undermining Māori land rights and Treaty of Waitangi obligations.

It passed its first reading on the same day by a margin of 68 to 55 along party lines; with the National, ACT and NZ First parties supporting the legislation and the Labour, Green parties and Te Pāti Māori opposing it. It was subsequently referred to the Environment select committee. The deadline for public submissions closed on 19 April 2024.

=== Select committee stage ===
By 14 May 2024, the Bill had received a total of 27,000 written submissions. 2,900 submitters asked to appear in-person before Parliament's environment select committee. Committee chair and National MP David McLeod said that the committee expected to hear from 1,100 submitters (550 organisations and 550 individuals) over a six-week period. Due to the large volume of submitters, the committee decided to filter the number of oral submissions using a ballot system. Companies and entities were given ten minutes to make their submissions while individuals will be given five minutes. Since conservation groups such as Forest & Bird and the Environmental Defence Society sent their supporters template messages, the committee opted to prioritise hearing from individuals who made unique submissions. Opposition Green Party MP Lan Pham and Labour MP Rachel Brooking objected to the ballot system, saying it would limit public input on the legislation.

In his submission John Ryan, the Controller and Auditor-General of New Zealand, expressed concern that the Bill did not require the Joint Ministers to comply with its conflict of interest mechanism, provide reasoning for approving an application or dissenting with the expert panel's recommendations, and called for stronger transparency and accountability safeguards in the legislation. Similarly Chief Ombudsman Peter Boshier expressed concern that the fast-track consenting regime would create "enormous executive powers" and opined it needed more "checks and balances."

The New Zealand Infrastructure Commission and the Parliamentary Commissioner for the Environment, Simon Upton, have both raised concerns about the longevity of the proposed legislation, with both suggesting that commercial projects be excluded from the scope. Both the Infrastructure Commission and Upton suggested that focusing on projects that have benefits for the public (e.g. roading, electricity generation and electricity transmission) would result in a broader public buy-in, increasing the chances that subsequent governments would not overturn the legislation. In addition, Upton expressed concerns that the proposed legislation downgraded both the environment and the role of the Environment Minister, could lead to sup-optimal outcomes through poor decision making, and heightened litigation risk. The Commissioner recommended significant changes to the Bill.

The Ministry for the Environment expressed concern that the initial version of the Fast-track Approvals legislation could marginalise local voices, violate Treaty of Waitangi commitments, adversely affect human and environmental health, expose ministers to legal risks, approve prohibited projects and erode the value of Conservation land. While the Ministry supported a standalone fast-track bill, it did not think that "this version was neither the cheapest, nor the fastest."

On 25 August, Cabinet agreed to recommend five changes to the legislation to the Environment Select Committee. First, an expert panel rather than ministers would be responsible for approving fast-track projects. Second, projects would be referred to an expert panel by the Infrastructure Minister, who would be required to consult with the Environment Minister and other relevant portfolio ministers during the referral process. Third, the timeframes for consultation at the referral and panel stages would be extended to give more time for those affected by the projects to participate. Fourth, expert panels would include individuals with expertise on environmental, Māori development and te ao Māori issues. Iwi/tribal authority representatives would only be included in the panels if required by Treaty of Waitangi settlements. Fifth, applicants would be required to provide information on previous decisions by approving authorities including court decisions in their applications to the referring minister. Labour and the Greens' environmental spokespersons Rachel Brooking and Lan Pham described the changes as insufficient to addressing the environmental impact of these projects. Te Rūnanga O Toa Rangatira chief executive Helmut Modlik welcomed the Government for addressing iwi concerns but expressed concerns about the Government's preference to only consult certain iwi based on Treaty settlements.

=== Second reading ===
On 13 November 2024, Parliament voted by a margin of 68 (National, ACT and NZ First) to 49 (Labour and Greens) votes to accept the amendments recommended by the Environment select committee. The bill passed its second reading by a margin of 68 to 54 votes. While National, ACT and NZ First supported the Bill, it was opposed by the Labour, Green parties and Te Pāti Māori.

=== Committee of the whole house ===
On 10 December 2024, RMA Reform Minister Chris Bishop submitted an amendment paper with several changes to the proposed legislation during the Committee of the House stage of the Fast-Track Approvals Bill. Based on advice from Clerk of the New Zealand House of Representatives David Wilson, Assistant Speaker Barbara Kuriger expressed concern that the listing of projects under the Fast-Track Bill benefitted specific people and ruled that it should be classified as private legislation and excluded from the Bill. The Government disagreed and recalled the Speaker Gerry Brownlee, who overturned Kuriger's decision and ruled that the Bill's list of projects did not grant private benefit. Brownlee's decision was criticised by the opposition Labour and Green parties, with Labour MP and Shadow leader of the House Kieran McAnulty stating that Labour had lost confidence in Brownlee's role as Speaker of the House.

=== Third reading ===
The Fast-track approvals Bill passed its third reading on 17 December 2024 along party lines. While the National, ACT and NZ First parties supported it, it was opposed by the Labour, Green and Te Pāti Māori. The third reading was disrupted by environmental activists from 350 Aotearoa who unfurled banners from the public gallery. RMA Reform Minister and National MP Chris Bishop said that the bill would help accelerate the building of much-needed infrastructure while ACT MP Cameron Luxton said the bill would boost productivity and ease the resource consent process. Conversely, Labour's environmental spokesperson Rachel Brooking expressed concern that the legislation would prioritise short-term profit over long-term sustainable environmental legislation. The Green party also vowed to revoke fast-track approved projects if elected into government. Similarly, Te Pāti Māori vowed to revoke any fast-track mining projects if elected into government. In response, NZ First MP Shane Jones likened Te Pāti Māori's proposed policy to the Venezuelan government's nationalisation policies.

== Application process ==
On 3 April 2024, the New Zealand Government opened the initial fast track application process, which concluded on 3 May 2024. By 12 April, RNZ reported that the Infrastructure Minister Chris Bishop had responded to 200 inquiries by organisations seeking information on how to apply for the fast track process. Notable applicants included Trans Tasman Resources (TTR), Stevenson Mining, OceanaGold and Water Holdings. TTR has sought permission from the Environmental Protection Authority to launch offshore mining in Taranaki while Stevenson Mining has sought consent for a coal mine at Mount Te Kuha near Westport. Multinational mining company OceanaGold has expressed interest in mining part of Wharekirauponga Forest Park in the Coromandel Peninsula for gold despite the presence of Archey's frogs. Water Holdings has sought to flood a section of land in the central Hawke's Bay's Ruataniwha plains in order to build a dam. All four projects have attracted opposition from conservation groups including Greenpeace Aotearoa New Zealand, Forest & Bird, Coromandel Watchdog of Hauraki and Wise Water Use Hawke's Bay.

On 9 April, Bishop clarified that the generic email sent to 200 organisations was not a "formal invite" to participate in the fast-track consent process after TTR released a statement on 8 April stating that it had been invited to apply for the fast-track consenting process under the proposed Fast-track Approvals Bill, which was in its Select Committee stage at the time. On 19 April, the Government released a list of about 200 organisations that it had provided information on how to apply for fast-track consents. These organisations included district councils, iwi (tribal) groups, mining companies, housing developers, power companies, and fisheries.

In late May 2024, The Post newspaper reported that an expert advisory group advising ministers on what should be included in the fast-track approval process would consist of six members: Pukeroa Oruawhata Trust chair person and lawyer David Tapsell, Hamilton city planning manager Mark Davey, former Treasury manager and ACC board deputy chairperson David Hunt, civil engineer Rosie Mercer, former Carter Holt Harvey environmental manager Murray Parrish and seafood industry veteran Vaughan Wilkinson. According to The Post, most of these individuals came from business backgrounds with none having a background in the hard sciences or mining industry. Tapsell, who is of Ngāti Whakaue/Waikato Tainui descent, provided a Māori perspective on the advisory group.

By late August 2024, the Government had received 384 applications to be included in the Fast-track bill. Of this figure, 40% were for housing and urban development projects, 24% for infrastructure projects, 18% for renewable energy projects, 8% for primary industry projects, and 5% for mining projects.

On 6 October 2024, Bishop announced that a total of 149 projects had been selected for fast tracking through the Government's Fast-track Approvals Bill (see the list). This included 44 housing developments, 7 aquaculture and farming projects, 43 infrastructure projects, 22 renewable energy projects and 11 mining projects. Notable projects included the redevelopment of the Eden Park sporting facility, Trans-Tasman Resources' seabed mining and the Waitaha Hydro Project. Labour's acting environmental spokesperson David Parker and Environmental Defence Society CEO Gary Taylor criticised the inclusion of several "environmentally questionable" projects including Trans-Tasman Resources' seabed mining and the Waitaha Hydro Project.

On 11 October, the Government released the independent Advisory Group's report on the 384 projects which had applied to be listed in the Fast-track approvals bill. Shane Jones identified conflicts of interest with eight projects including Te Aupouri Fisheries Management Ltd, James Murray Aquaculture Ltd, Taharoa Iron Sands Ltd (three projects), Kings Quarry Ltd, Katikati Quarries Ltd and Matamata Metal Supplies. Chris Bishop also transferred oversight of Winton Land Limited's development in Auckland to Simeon Brown due to a conflict of interest. On 31 October, the Auditor General John Ryan launched an inquiry into how conflicts of interest in fast-track projects were identified and managed as ministers decided what projects should be included in the Fast-track approvals legislation.

== Responses ==
=== Polling ===
A May 2024 1News poll found 40% support the bill, 41% opposed and 19% unsure.

A June 2024 Taxpayers Union-Curia poll found 44% of respondents were in support, 32% opposed it and 24% were unsure. Men and people who voted for the coalition parties were much more likely to say they supported it.

An August 2024 Horizon Research poll organised by Greenpeace found 40% think it is a bad idea, 30% a good idea and 30% unsure.

=== Support ===
In late March 2024 Sanders Unsworth consultancy partner Charles Finny, who served as the lead negotiator for the New Zealand–China Free Trade Agreement disagreed with conservation group Forest & Bird's position that the fast-track approval bill would clash with the environmental provisions of New Zealand's free trade agreements with the UK and EU. He said that the expert panels would help safeguard environmental considerations within the legislation's framework.

In May 2024, BusinessNZ economist John Pask suggested some tweaks to the bill in his parliamentary submission. He advocated a "balancing exercise" between economic development and environmental protection. Energy Resources Aotearoa policy director Craig Barry argued that the fast-track approvals legislation was needed since "it has become difficult for projects to gain approval within reasonable time-frames [under the current resource consent process], even for those projects with demonstrable benefits." Foodstuffs New Zealand government relations head Melissa Hodd supported the proposed legislation, saying "it believed it could help it develop additional supermarkets faster."

In June, Taxpayers' Union policy and public affairs manager James Ross said: "New Zealand's economy is limping along and we need to get building again. "That can only happen with wholesale planning reform but, for now, this Bill offers a partial stop-gap solution to get the country's cogs turning."

=== Opposition ===
On 14 March 2024, Greenpeace Aotearoa New Zealand objected to the proposed Fast-track Approvals Bill, saying that the fast-track consenting "would enable just three Government Ministers to approve development projects more quickly, by bypassing planning legislation and the checks and balances that are in place." The advocacy group advocated its commitment to fighting to protect people and nature regardless of the Government's actions. Greenpeace's parliamentary submission denounced the proposed legislation as "anti-democratic, anti-transparency, vulnerable to corruption and lacking any semblance of environmental protection". It criticised the fast-track process for giving three ministers the power to approve or deny development projects.

On 8 May 2024, the Māori iwi (tribe) Ngāti Toa Rangatira organised a protest march against the Fast-track Approvals Bill outside the New Zealand Parliament grounds. The iwi'schief executive Helmut Modlik said that the proposed bill would "allow big corporations to do anything they want in Aotearoa, without any say from the public, iwi, hapū, environmental experts and communities." Iwi members presented trees and a petition to Māori Development Minister Tama Potaka and RMA Reform Minister Chris Bishop.

On 12 May, Environmental Defence Society spokesperson and lawyer Raewyn Peart expressed concern that the proposed legislation could allow projects to be built with fewer environment checks and said that it harked back to Think Big projects of the Third National Government.

The historian Dame Anne Salmond's submission condemned the proposed Bill's alleged "utter disregard for democracy" and described it as hostile to the environment. She claimed that the proposed legislation lacked any party mandate since it was promoted by a minority party NZ First, which only gained 6% of the popular vote during the 2023 New Zealand general election. She also urged the governing National Party to honour its election promises to safeguarding New Zealand's natural environment, diversity, waters and landscapes for future generations.

On 8 June, protests against the proposed legislation were held in Auckland, Whakatāne, Christchurch, Nelson, and Tākaka.

=== Implications for foreign trade ===
In an unusual move, the Ministry of Foreign Affairs and Trade (MFAT) did not provide advice on the Fast-track Approvals Bill before its first parliamentary reading on 7 March 2024. An MFAT spokesperson confirmed that it had prepared advice regarding the bill after 11 March but would not share it due to "legal professional privilege." In addition, the Ministry for the Environment provided advice around the Bill's international obligations in the form of a Regulatory Impact Statement, which was not publicly available.

Conservation group Forest & Bird expressed concern that the Fast-track bill could breach clauses in New Zealand's free trade agreements with both the United Kingdom and European Union requiring environmental protections and due process for feedback. The NZ-EU trade agreement requires that the public and advocacy groups be given a sufficient timeframe for providing feedback on the environment impact of mining projects. Forest & Bird spokesperson Geoff Keey said "it was really a bill to override environmental laws. It's not really fast tracking." Similar concerns were raised by the World Wildlife Fund (WWF) New Zealand chief executive Dr Kayla Kingdon-Bebb.

In early May 2024, the United Kingdom Government confirmed that it was monitoring the passage of the Fast-track Approvals Bill after Liberal Democrats Member of Parliament Wera Hobhouse raised concerns abouts its impact on the New Zealand–United Kingdom Free Trade Agreement in the House of Commons. In response, Infrastructure Minister Chris Bishop and Trade Minister Todd McClay downplayed concerns that the Bill would affect the NZ-UK free trade agreement, which they argued allowed governments to set their own environmental standards. Bishop claimed that the fast-track approvals process would accelerate the construction of pro-environment and de-carbonisation initiatives like wind farms and solar farms.

== Fast-track Approvals Amendment Act 2025 ==
In late August 2025, Economic Growth Minister Nicola Willis announced that the Government would amend the Fast-track Approvals Act 2024 to accelerate the consent process for new supermarket chains seeking to enter the New Zealand supermarket market. Willis said that this new "express lane" policy would help beak the country's supermarket duopoly, which is dominated by Woolworths and Foodstuffs. In response, the Green Party's commerce and consumer affairs spokesperson Ricardo Menéndez March said that the Government's proposed policy did not go far enough and urged the Government to breakup the supermarket duopoly. Labour's finance spokesperson Barbara Edmonds said that the fast-track regime would not help ordinary New Zealan'ds but declined to outline Labour's alternative policy.

On 3 November 2025 Willis, RMA Reform Minister Chris Bishop and Regional Development Minister Shane Jones announced that the Government would introduce the Fast-track Approvals Amendment Bill to create a new fast-tracked consenting regime for supermarkets. Proposed changes to the Fast-track Approvals Act 2004 have included increasing ministerial oversight, reducing consultation requirements, restricting the panel's discretion to invite additional persons for consultation, easing infrastructure-based consent barriers and accelerating the approvals process for all application types under the Act.

The bill passed its first reading on 6 November and underwent an 11-day submission timeframe which concluded on 11 November. RNZ reported that Parliament's environment select committee used a loophole in parliamentary rules that shortened the public consultation timeframe for the proposed legislation from the standard six weeks to 11 days. By 8 December, the environment select committee had received 2,518 written submissions and 85 oral submissions on the Fast-track Approvals Amendment Bill, with 95% of submitters opposed to the amendments. Key concerns included the potential removal of environmental safeguards, the subordination of the Environmental Protection Authority to the Environment Minister, curbs on the role and powers of the panels and empowering the Infrastructure Minister to designate certain projects as nationally or regionally significant.

On 11 December, Parliament passed the Fast-track Approvals Amendment Act 2025 under urgency. It was supported by the government coalition parties but opposed by all opposition parties. Following consultation, the final version of the law removed a clause that limited expert panels' ability to seek feedback from other relevant parties, clarified the statutory independence of the EPA, excluded a clause allowing fast-track applicants to complain about expert panels, scrapped a 15-day time limit on the establishment of independent panels, and extended the decision-making timeframe for expert panels from 60 to 90 days.
