= Port Hutt =

Rural settlement on Chatham Island, New Zealand

- Rural settlement
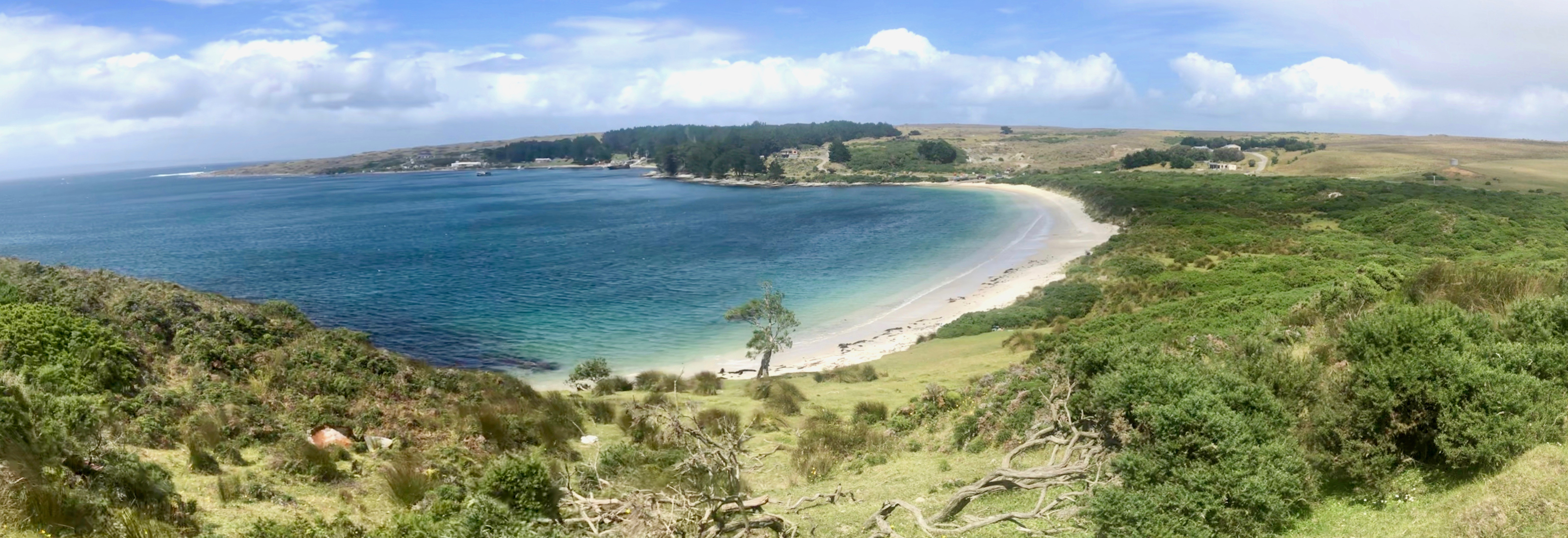
- View of Port Hutt from the northeast
- Interactive map of Port Hutt
- Coordinates: 43°48′53″S 176°42′35″W
- Country: New Zealand
- Territorial authority: Chatham Islands

Port Hutt is a small settlement and beach on Chatham Island, in the Chatham Islands group in New Zealand. It is located in the northwest of the island, near the northern end of the large indentation of Petre Bay, some 24 km from the island's largest settlement Waitangi (which lies near the southern end of Petre Bay).

== History ==
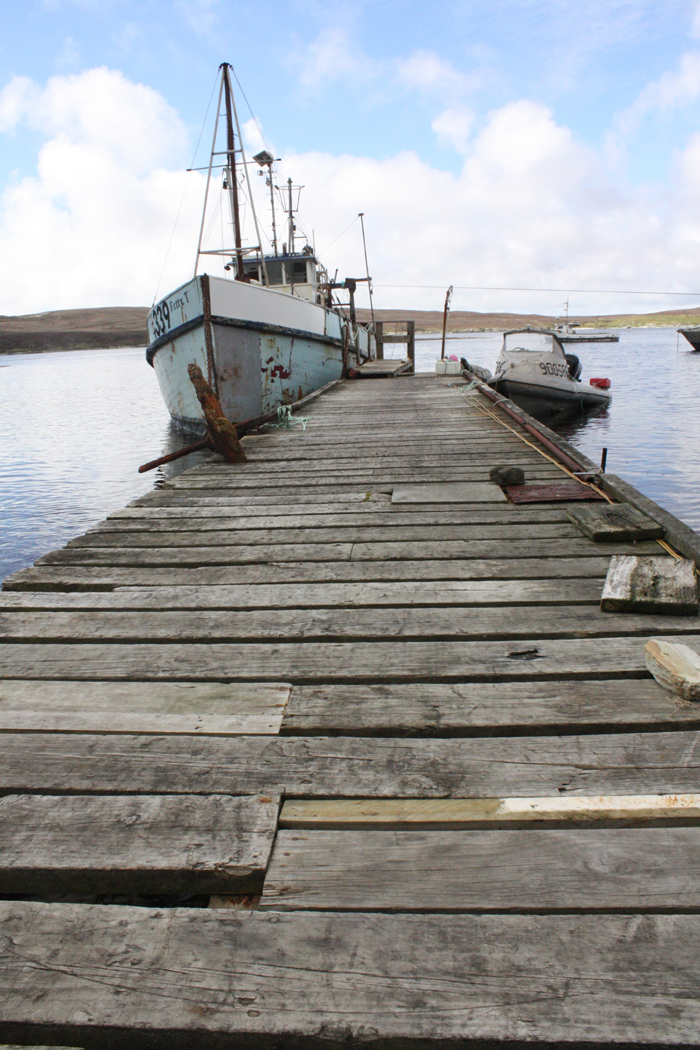
The Port Hutt wharf

The beach is where Ngāti Tama and Ngāti Mutunga invaders landed in November 1835.

== Shipwrecks ==
The port was one of the Chathams' main harbours during the early years of European settlement. Several vessels were wrecked on the reef, among them the whaling brig Ann and Mary in 1839 and the brigantine Lowestoff in 1847.

The wreck of the SS Thomas Currell lies in shallow water on the beach. She was built in 1919 as a fishing trawler, and was converted for use as a minesweeper during World War II, returned to service in the fishing industry after the war and eventually was used as a floating freezer in Port Hutt. She was run ashore in 1968.

== Geography ==
The settlement sits at the edge of a small, deep inlet known as either Port Hutt or Whangaroa Harbour. The inlet is guarded by reefs with surround Point Dawson, the 70-metre high headland at the western edge of the harbour mouth.
