= Waitaha River =

River in New Zealand

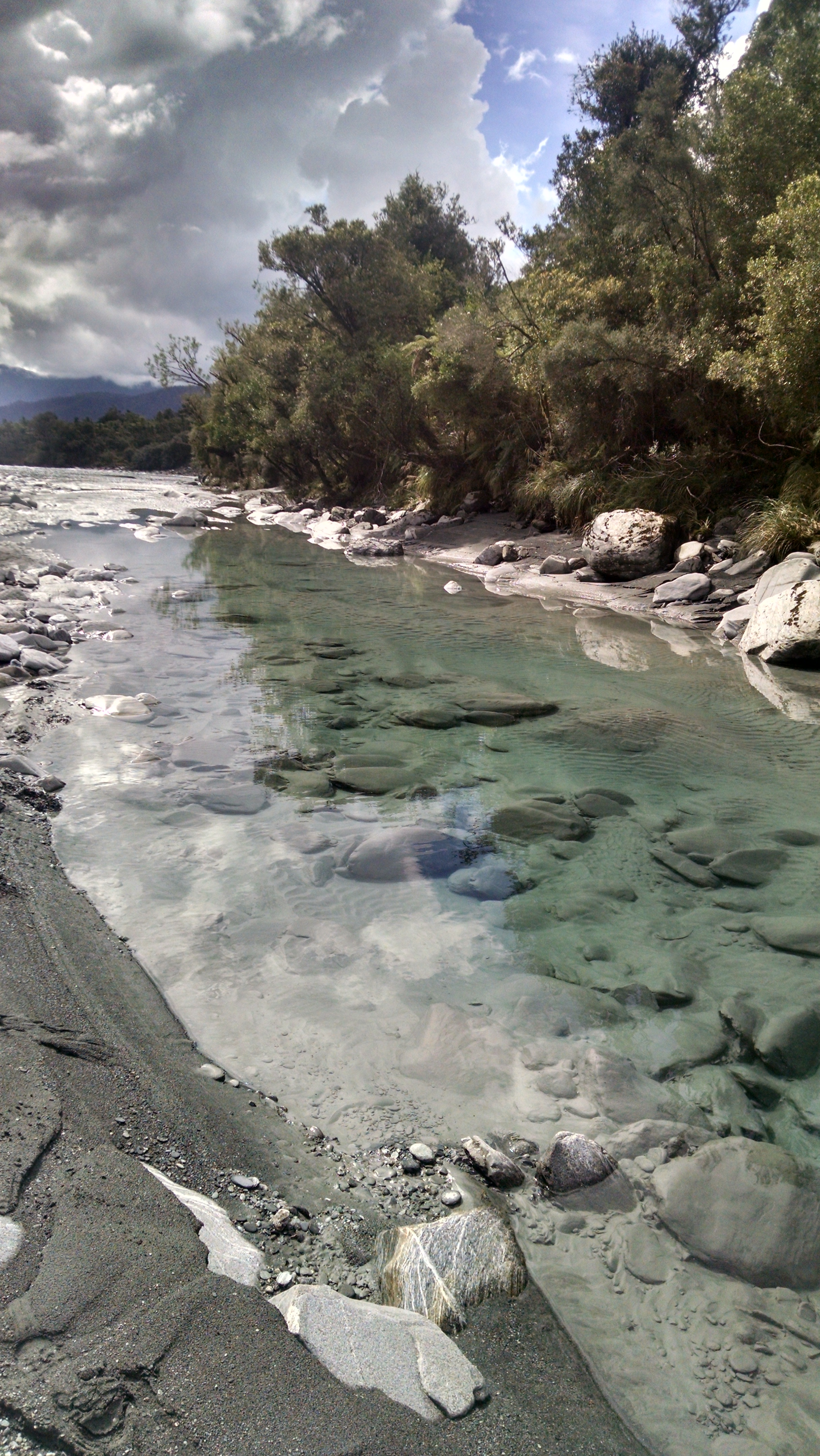
- The lower reaches of the Waitaha River

Location
- Country: New Zealand

Physical characteristics
- Source
  - location: Southern Alps
- Mouth
  - location: Tasman Sea
  - coordinates: 42°57′30″S 170°39′24″E
- Length: 36 km (22 mi)

The Waitaha River is a river of the West Coast region of New Zealand's South Island.

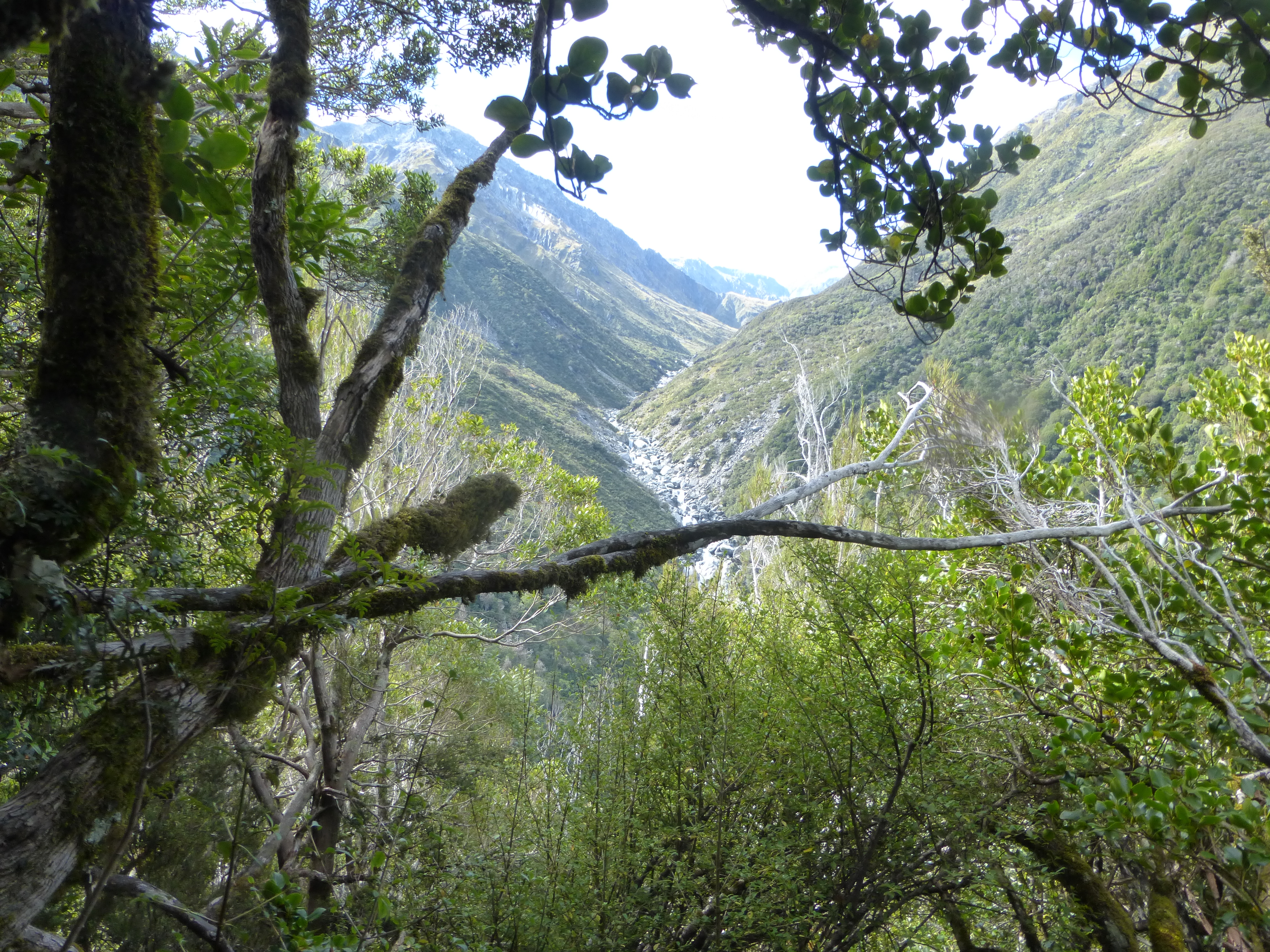
Upper reaches of the Waitaha River

Waitaha is Māori and it literally means wai a river or stream taha to be passed on one side. It was named by the Waitaha, an early South Island iwi (tribe or nation) who named a number of South Island places. It flows northwest from the Bloomfield Range of the Southern Alps, some 10 kilometres (6.2 mi) north of Mount Whitcombe, and reaches the Tasman Sea 15 kilometres (9.3 mi) southwest of Ross. Near the coast, it is crossed by State Highway 6, and just downstream from the bridge, the Kakapotahi River or Little Waitaha River flows into the Waitaha River.

The Waitaha River is renowned for gold, both alluvial and from glacial deposition. Coarse gold has been dredged downstream of Morgans Gorge where the river opens into the flats. Several gold mining operations continue in the area today.

There is a proposal by Westpower Ltd to divert water from the river for power generation. The project is supported by the Mayor of Westland, Bruce Smith. It is opposed by the Royal Forest and Bird Protection Society, Whitewater NZ (the group representing the interests of kayakers and canoeists), and the Federated Mountain Clubs (FMC). The land alongside the middle and upper reaches of the river is conservation land administered by the Department of Conservation (DOC) and has "stewardship status", with puts its protection level below that of a national park. DOC had given approval in principle for a 1.5 kilometres (0.93 mi) water race to be built as a tunnel, and was to make a final decision after public hearings had finished in December 2016. The concession was denied in August 2019, but reopened in a fast track application, as one of 149 projects.
