= SS Thomas Currell =

Fishing trawler and minesweeper

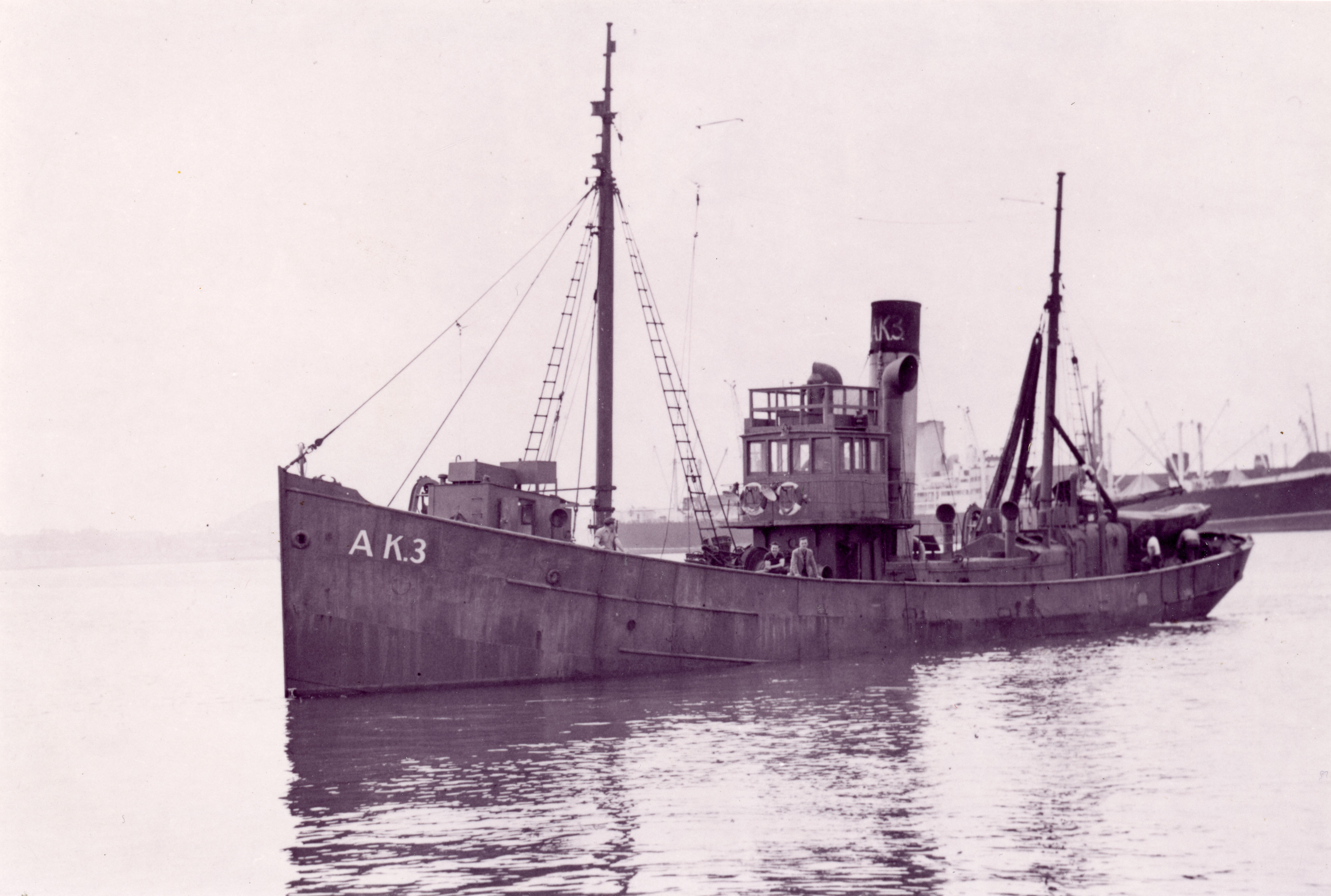
- Thomas Currell departing Auckland in 1946

History

United Kingdom
- Name: Enrico
- Builder: R Williamson & Son. Workington
- Launched: 1919
- Completed: May 1919
- Fate: Sold to Sanford Ltd in 1921

New Zealand
- Name: Thomas Currell
- Owner: 1921-1952 Sanford Ltd 1952-late 1950s Combined fisheries Ltd late 1950s-1968 Wellington Trawler Company
- In service: 1922
- Out of service: 1968
- Identification: Pennant numbers AK1438, AK1, T11, AK3, WN10, WN122
- Fate: Deliberately ran aground in 1968

General characteristics
- Class & type: Strath-class trawler
- Length: 115.2 ft (35.1 m)
- Beam: 22.1 ft (6.7 m)
- Draft: 12.2 ft (3.7 m)
- Crew: 10

SS Thomas Currell was a Strath-class trawler built for the United Kingdom for use as a fishing trawler. She was purchased by Sanford Ltd in 1921 for use in New Zealand. She would be used as a minesweeper during World War II, and is currently wrecked at Port Hutt, Chatham Island.

== Early operational history ==
Originally built as the Enrico, she was built by R Williamson & Son, located at Workington for use as a fishing trawler. In 1921, Sanford was expanding its fleet of fishing vessels, having heard of several trawlers in the United Kingdom, Sanford sent several representatives to look over the vessels. The Enrico seemed to fit the needs of the company and was purchased for £5,500 and had her name changed to Thomas Currell. Before her voyage to New Zealand, she received a few alterations and was given spare equipment, including a spare propeller and shaft. The voyage to Auckland took three months. She arrived in February 1922 and was put into service shortly after.

== World War II ==
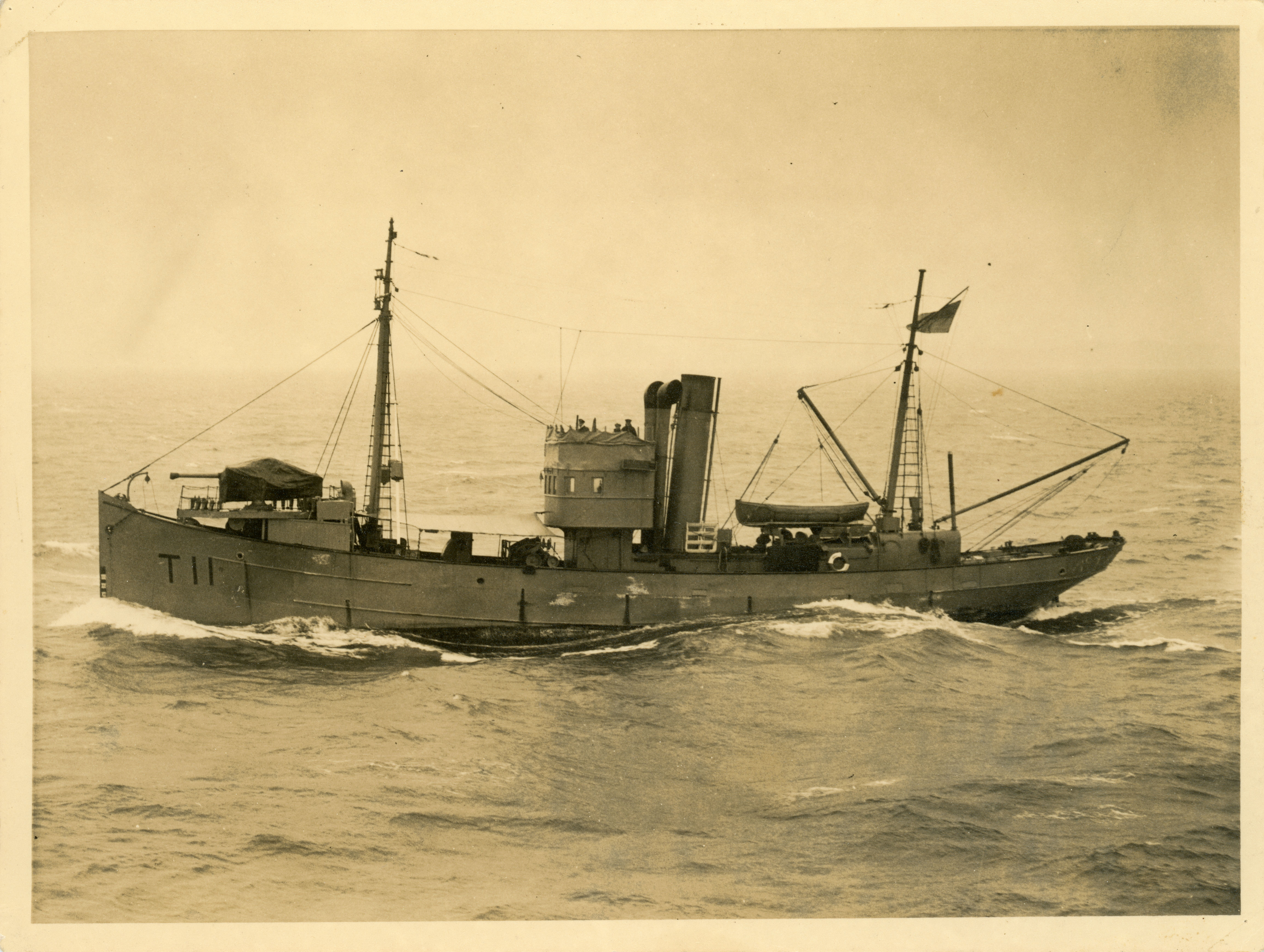
Thomas Currell as a minesweeper during World War II

At the outbreak of World War II, Thomas Currell was on a usual fishing trip, and was unaware of the declaration of war due to a lack of radios on board, and was unable to be contacted. She returned to Auckland, one week after war was declared, discharged her catch and was shifted to the Devonport Naval Base, after being commandeered by the government. Along with the other Sanford trawlers, James Cosgrove and the Humphrey, she was converted for minesweeping duties and fitted with 4-inch (102 mm) guns, depth charges, and minesweeping equipment, also being given a wireless telephone and telegraph equipment. The Thomas Currell was commissioned for the Royal New Zealand Navy on 10 October 1939, serving at Auckland. On the morning of 19 June 1940, a distress signal was received from the passenger ship RMS Niagara, reporting it had struck a naval mine between Bream Head, and the Moko Hinau Islands and was sinking. The James Cosgrove and Thomas Currell were ordered to sea, steaming at full speed towards her, arriving at 12:50 PM with minesweeping gear being deployed at 2:48 PM. She and the James Cosgrove discovered two contact mines which had been laid recently, both were destroyed by rifle fire. Thomas Currell was paid off in September 1944, with work to convert her back into a fishing trawler completed by late 1945.

== Post war ==
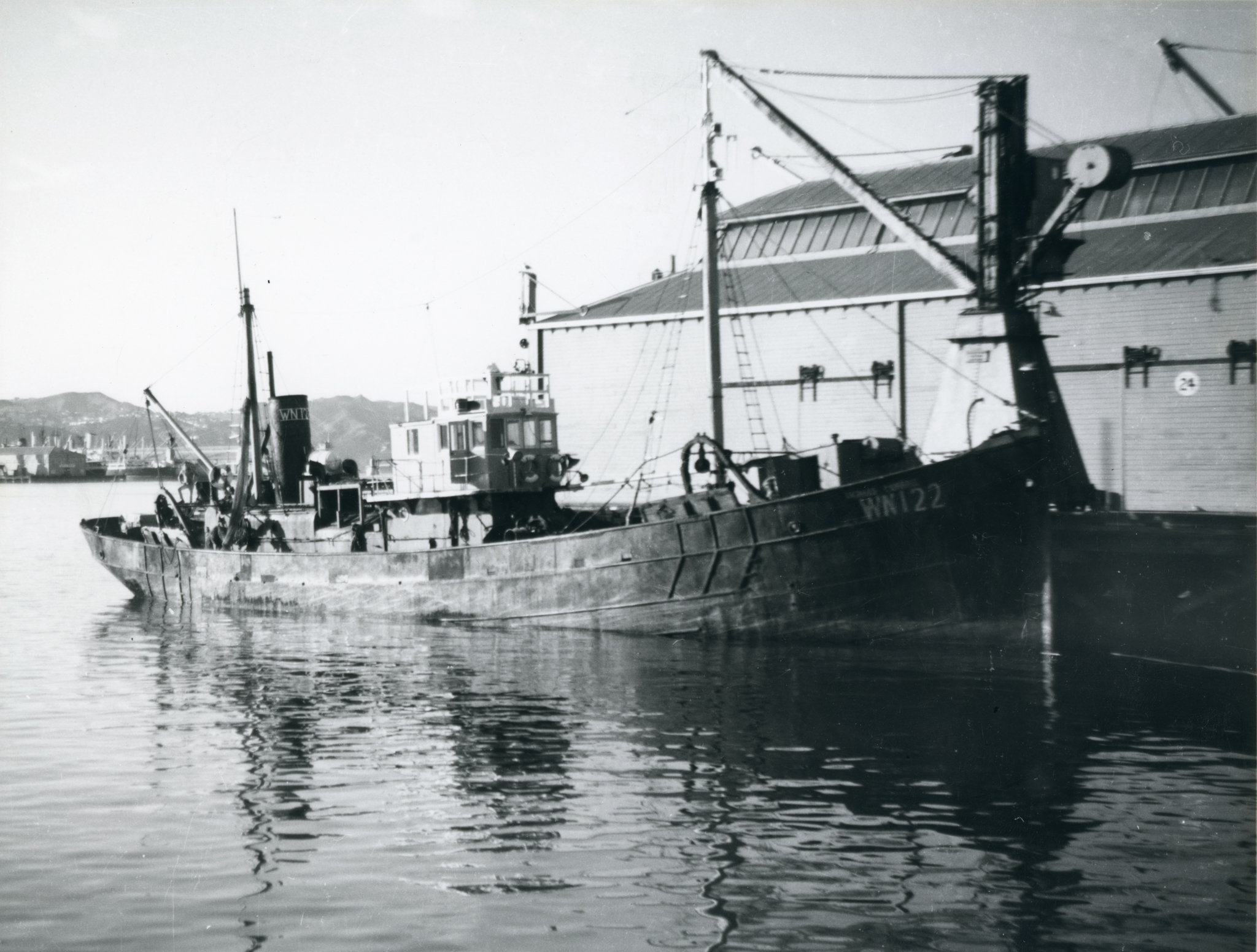
Thomas Currell after her conversion to diesel

Thomas Currell resumed fishing once converted back into a fishing trawler. She was laid up in 1952 and put up for sale, as large steam trawlers were no longer an economical method of fishing, with coal becoming more expensive and crew becoming harder to find as she was rather dated. Sanford was approached by the Wellington Fishermen's Co-operative with the proposal to purchase a large trawler to ensure a regular supply of fish for the co-op, retailers, and customers. The Thomas Currell was examined and it was found the trawler needed some hull repairs, with work being carried out by Mason Bros Engineering Co Ltd in the Devonport drydock. She was sold for £7,000 and sailed to Wellington under the command of John Campbell.

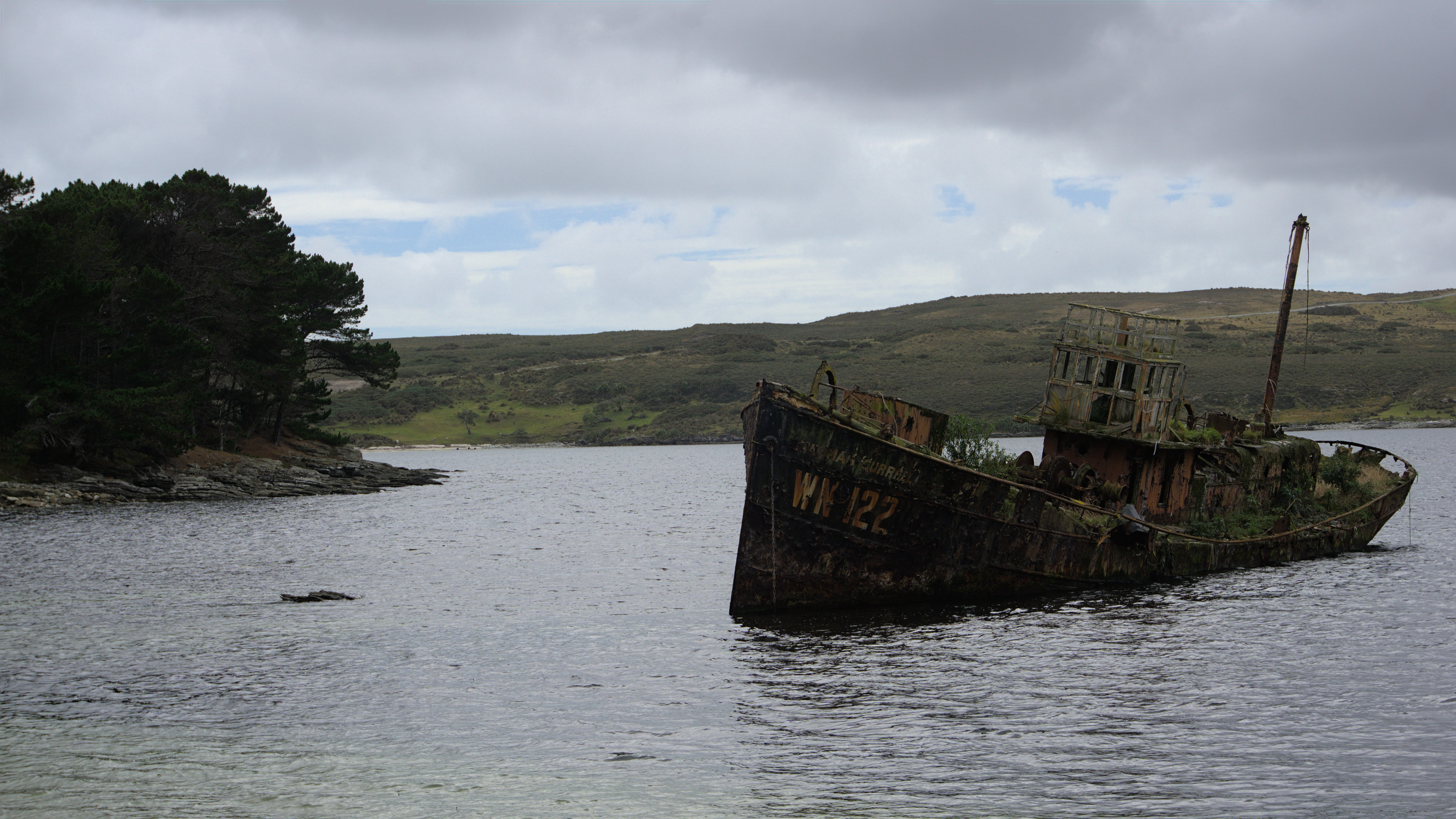
The Thomas Currell wreck in 2023

In 1955, the Thomas Currell was re-engined as her current boiler was becoming more expensive to operate. A 480 brake horsepower (360 kW) diesel engine was installed, with additional ballast needed due to a 20-ton difference in weight between her old engine and her new engine. The cost of this refit was £20,000 in total. In the late 1950s, the company who owned the Thomas Currell went out of business, and she was put up for sale. She was sold to the Wellington Trawler Company. In 1966, during the Chatham Islands crayfish boom, the Thomas Currell was moved to Port Hutt to act as a floating freezer to store crayfish, which the Holmdale would take to mainland New Zealand. She was maintained by Jimmy Lenagham, who had been the chief engineer on her voyage to Port Hutt. While she was moored, she would occasionally break free from her moorings, hitting other ships. This caused Lenagham considerable anxiety so in 1968, he decided to rid himself of the problem and ran the Thomas Currell ashore at full speed at Port Hutt. She remains there to this day.
