= Westpower =

Electricity distribution business based in Greymouth, New Zealand

Westpower Limited
- Company type: Private
- Headquarters: Greymouth, New Zealand
- Area served: West Coast
- Services: Electricity distribution
- Owners: West Coast Electric Power Trust (100%)
- Website: www.westpower.co.nz

Westpower Limited is an electricity distribution business based in Greymouth, New Zealand. The company owns and operates the electricity distribution network in the Westland and Grey districts, and part of the Buller District. The company is wholly owned by the West Coast Electric Power Trust.

The company's distribution network consists of 2,300 km (1,400 mi) of lines, supplying electricity to approximately 13,700 customers. The network covers the towns of Reefton, Runanga, Greymouth, Hokitika, Ross, Franz Josef and Fox Glacier.

== Network statistics ==
Westpower Limited network statistics for the year ending 31 March 2024
Parameter	Value
Parameter	2024
Regulatory asset base	$120 million
Line charge revenue	$24.6 million
Capital expenditure	$4.9 million
Operating expenditure	$14.2 million
Customer connections	14,326
Energy delivered	230 GWh
Peak demand	36 MW
Total line length	2,187 km
Distribution and low-voltage overhead lines	1,592 km
Distribution and low-voltage underground cables	281 km
Subtransmission lines and cables	313 km
Poles	20,411
Distribution transformers	2,536
Zone substation transformers	22
Average interruption duration (SAIDI)	208 minutes
Average interruption frequency (SAIFI)	2.11

== Generation assets ==
In August 2019 the company's proposed hydro project on the Waitaha River was denied a concession by the Department of Conservation. In 2024 the project was scheduled in the government's Fast Track Approvals Act.

=== Operational ===
Name	Type	Location	Capacity (MW)	Annual generation (average GWh)	Commissioned
Amethyst	Hydro	Hari Hari, Westland	7.6	50	2013

=== Proposed / under construction ===
Name	Type	Location	Projected capacity (MW)	Status
Waitaha	Hydro	Waitaha River, Westland	23	Proposed
