= South Taranaki Bight =

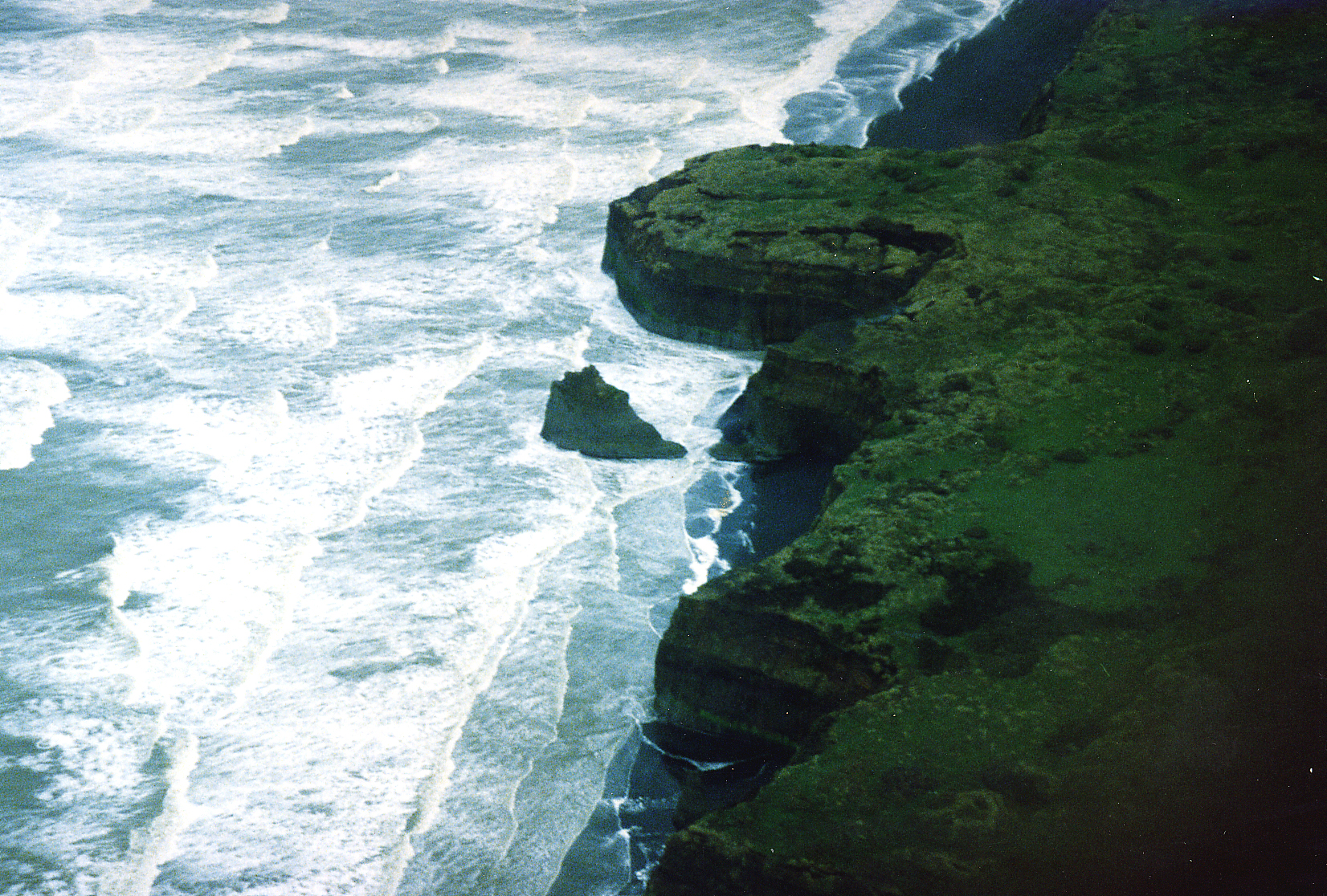
- Taranaki coast near Pātea
- Interactive map of South Taranaki Bight
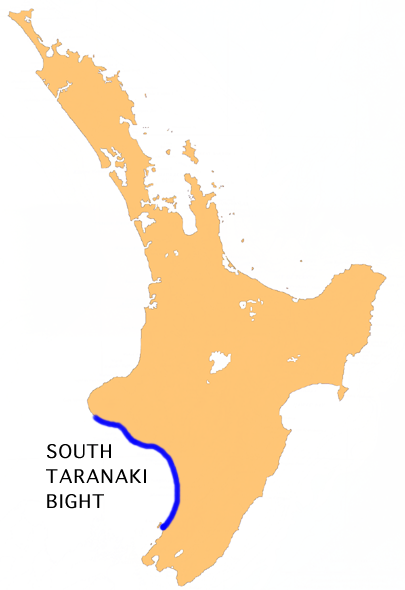
- Location of South Taranaki Bight
- Location: North Island
- Coordinates: 39°40′S 174°10′E
- Type: Bay
- Part of: Tasman Sea
- Basin countries: New Zealand

The South Taranaki Bight is a large bay on the west coast of New Zealand, south of Taranaki, west of the Manawatū, north and west of the western entrance of Cook Strait and north of the South Island. The name is sometimes used for a much smaller bay in South Taranaki, between the mouth of the Kaupokonui Stream directly south of Mount Taranaki and the mouth of the Pātea River.

Approximately 18,000 years ago during the Last Glacial Maximum when sea levels were over 100 metres (330 ft) lower than present day levels, the South Taranaki Bight was a coastal plain which connected the North and South Islands, featuring rivers which drained into the Cook Strait (then a harbour) to the south-east. Sea levels began to rise 7,000 years ago, eventually separating the islands and connecting the Cook Strait to the Tasman Sea.

The bight was once a calving ground for southern right whales in winter and spring and early Europeans in New Zealand called it Mothering Bay after the large number of cow-calf pairs. However right whale numbers were greatly reduced by whaling and only a handful of cows visit regularly today. Pygmy blue whales were discovered off Cape Egmont in 2007 and the South Taranaki Bight was confirmed in 2014 as the only known feeding and foraging ground for blue whales in New Zealand, hosting a unique population of its own. Blue whales also frequent an area off Kahurangi Point in the nearby northern South Island.

A seabed survey by the National Institute of Water and Atmospheric Research in 2023 found that the bight contained 14 rocky reefs with abundant life including "kelp forests, macroalgal meadows, and gardens of 39 species of sponge. Blue cod (including nurseries at four sites), scarlet wrasse, butterfly perch, leatherjackets and tarakihi dominated the fish species, also including snapper, trevally, kingfish, and kahawai".

Australian-owned mining company Trans-Tasman Resources has proposed to mine iron sand from the bight. In 2017, they were given approval to mine 50 million tonnes of the South Taranaki Bight seabed each year, but in 2021 this approval was overturned by the New Zealand Supreme Court.

== See also ==
- North Taranaki Bight
