= Trans-Tasman Resources =

Australian mining company operating in New Zealand

- Industry: Mining
- Headquarters: New Zealand
- Key people: Alan Eggers, John Seton
- Parent: Manuka Resources
- Website: www.ttrl.co.nz

Trans-Tasman Resources (TTR) is a New Zealand mining company, wholly owned since 2023 by an Australian mining company Manuka Resources.

== Company history ==
Trans-Tasman Resources was established in New Zealand in 2007 with headquarters in Wellington. In 2010 it announced private equity firm Denham Capital (based in Boston) had invested in the company. TTR was acquired by Australian mining company Manuka Resources in November 2022, and directors Alan Eggers and John Seton joined the Manuka Resources board.

== Seabed mining proposal ==
In 2016 TTR applied to the Environmental Protection Authority for permission to mine minerals from the seabed off the West Coast of the North Island of New Zealand, an area known as the South Taranaki Bight. TTR proposed to dredge 5 million tonnes per annum of iron sand from 65km2 of seabed over 35 years in order to extract vanadium, iron and titanium.

The sand would be extracted by a machine ‘crawler’ which would remove up to 11m depth of sand from the seabed. The sand would be processed aboard a specialised mining vessel, with an expected 10% yield. The concentrated ore would be transferred to another ship for export, and the remaining 90% of sediment, approximately 45 million tonnes per year, would be discharged to the seabed. Marine sediment is a recognised pollutant and so its discharge requires approval from the EPA. TTR director Alan Eggers admits that the seabed mining "totally destroys the seabed" but claims it rehabilitates in two years and would only affect 'a few starfish and worms'. Opponents say that the environment is permanently destroyed. A seabed survey by the National Institute of Water and Atmospheric Research in 2023 found that the area that would be affected by the marine discharge had rocky reefs with abundant life including "kelp forests, macroalgal meadows, and gardens of 39 species of sponge. Blue cod (including nurseries at four sites), scarlet wrasse, butterfly perch, leatherjackets and tarakihi dominated the fish species, also including snapper, trevally, kingfish, and kahawai".

TTR’s proposals were initially redacted by the EPA, but after an application to the Environment Court by environmental group Kiwis Against Seabed Mining, Ngāti Ruanui iwi and Talleys Fisheries Group the documents were made public in November 2016.

The Environmental Protection Authority granted a marine discharge consent to mining company Trans-Tasman Resources (TTR) in 2017, but a later High Court decision cancelled these consents. In April 2020, the Court of Appeal found that EPA's 2017 decision was not consistent with the law to protect the environment from harmful substances. TTR appealed to the Supreme Court, to which campaigner Debbie Ngarewa-Packer said "We’re annoyed that we may have to go to court for a fourth time as right now our efforts are focused on protecting our community from Covid-19. But we are undeterred in our resolve and we will oppose TTR’s application for yet another appeal." The Supreme Court unanimously rejected the appeal “over lack of environmental caution”, directing the EPA to decline the proposed mining “if consent conditions could not prevent pollution”.

In March 2024 two days of hearings to reconsider TTR's proposals were held. However TTR withdrew their application in March 2024, sparking fears by opponents that they would try to gain approval through the Government’s 'Fast Track' consenting process. TTR told investors on 28 March that it had been invited to apply for fast-track approval. The Minister for Infrastructure Chris Bishop responded by saying this was misleading, as the 'invitation' TTR was referring to was a form letter his office had sent to more than 200 organisations that had expressed interested in the Fast Track Approvals process. Environmental group Kiwis Against Seabed Mining subsequently made a complaint to the Australian Securities Exchange about TTR claiming to hold a consent and not declaring to shareholders that this has been quashed.

In August 2024 TTR successfully applied to expand the permitted area for seabed mining from 6600 to 24,300 km2. In September that year, five Greenpeace protestors were arrested at the headquarters of mining industry lobby group Straterra. The protestors were objecting to Straterra's work for TTR on fast-tracking their seabed mining proposal.

On 7 October 2024 TTR told the Australian Stock Exchange it could contribute $1 billion a year to the country's export earnings. It retracted the claim two days later, causing Kiwis Against Seabed Mining to call for the TTR proposal to be removed from the Fast Track approved projects.

On 5 February 2026, the fast-track approvals panel issued a draft decision declining TTR's application to mine the South Taranaki Bight for 30 years, citing credible risks to local fauna and concerns about sediment plume and noise levels. TTR executive chairman Alan Eggers expressed disappointment with the panel's draft decision while Chris Bishop, the minister leading the fast-track approvals regime, said that a final decision is expected on 18 March 2026. On 19 December, TTR withdrew its fast-track application to mine the South Taranaki Bight's seabed.
