= Environmental Defence Society =

New Zealand environmental organisation

Environmental Defence Society (EDS) is a not-for-profit environmental organisation based in New Zealand. It focuses on issues surrounding the Resource Management Act 1991 and is made up of resource management professionals who are committed to improving environmental outcomes within New Zealand.

== History ==
EDS was established in 1971 by a group of law students and scientists. The idea behind EDS was to bring together the disciplines of science, law and planning to advocate for the environment. Since its inception, EDS has had a long and largely successful history of litigating environmentally significant cases. Early cases EDS was involved in include the Huntly water rights case, litigation concerning LPG terminals, the Aramoana Smelter, the Clyde High Dam, several Think Big projects and a proposed resort development at Karikari in the Far North.

During the 1980s EDS began a substantive involvement in mining cases and was instrumental in persuading the New Zealand government to change the law to enable better public involvement and more emphasis on the environmental effects of mining. There was a special focus on the Coromandel Peninsula, where EDS was instrumental in preventing a proposed large-scale open-cast mine from proceeding at Otama Beach.

EDS has a long history of involvement in cases concerning water. The Society was involved with other groups in an effort to get water conservation orders established in law after a successful opposition to a series of dams on the Mōtū River. Indeed, EDS assisted the Queen Elizabeth II National Trust to obtain the first ever national water conservation order for that wild and scenic river and went on to support similar orders over the Ahuriri and Rakaia Rivers in the South Island.

In 2002, EDS litigated on the climate change impacts and the carbon dioxide from Otahuhu Power Station gas thermal power station. EDS appealed the Otahuhu C resource consents granted by Auckland Regional Council. EDS argued that the predicted annual emissions of 1.2 million tonnes of carbon dioxide would contribute to climate change via the greenhouse effect and that the consent conditions should require complete carbon offsetting by planting of new forests. The Environment Court agreed with the scientific consensus on anthropogenic climate change and concluded that the proposed CO_{2} emissions would be an "adverse effect of some consequence". The court declined to impose the forest offsetting condition due to concerns over its "efficacy, appropriateness and reasonableness".

More recently EDS has become increasingly involved in providing support and capacity building for individuals, community organisations and councils; in undertaking research and policy analysis on key environmental issues; and in profiling key issues through seminars and conferences.

EDS is now implementing a major new initiative on oceans to chart the way forward for reform. EDS is looking at policy framework for marine mammals protection, marine protected areas and marine spatial planning.

In its research and policy work EDS seeks to build constructive partnerships and relationships with business, government and other groups across civil society.

== Supporters ==
EDS Supporters provide financial support to assist with the programme of activities undertaken by the Society.

- NZ Law Foundation
- Borrin Foundation

== Key publications ==
- "Reform of the Resource Management System: A model for the future" 2019 by Greg Severinsen
- "Farming the Sea" 2019 by Raewyn Peart
- "Governance of the Hauraki Gulf" 2019 by Raewyn Peart
- "Voices from the Sea: managing New Zealand's Fisheries" 2018 by Raewyn Peart
- "The Story of the Hauraki Gulf" 2016 by Raewyn Peart
- "Dolphins of Aotearoa: Living with New Zealand dolphins" 2013 by Raewyn Peart
- "Caring for our Coast: An EDS guide to managing coastal development" 2013 by Lucy Brake and Raewyn Peart ** Winner of the 2013 RMLA Publications Award (Resource Management Law Association)
- "Safeguarding Our Oceans: Strengthening marine protection in New Zealand" 2012 by Kate Mulcahy, Raewyn Peart & Abbie Bull
- "Treasuring Our Biodiversity: An EDS Guide to the protection of New Zealand's indigenous habitats and species" 2012 by Lucy Brake and Raewyn Peart
- "Wonders of the Sea: The protection of New Zealand's marine mammals" 2012 by Kate Mulcahy and Raewyn Peart
- "Governing our Oceans: Environmental Legislation for the Exclusive Economic Zone" 2011 by Raewyn Peart, Kate Mulcahy and Kelsey Serjeant
- "Strengthening Second Generation Regional Policy Statements" 2010 by Raewyn Peart and Peter Raeburn
- "Managing Freshwater: An EDS Guide" 2010 by Raewyn Peart, Kate Mulcahy and Natasha Garvan
- "Managing the Marine Environment: An EDS Community Guide" 2010 by Raewyn Peart and Kate Mulcahy
- "Beyond the Tide: Integrating the management of New Zealand’s coast" 2009 by Raewyn Peart
- "Castles in the Sand: What’s happening to the New Zealand coast?" 2009 by Raewyn Peart
- "The New Zealanders’ Guide to the Resource Management Act 1991 (3rd Edition)" 2008 by Raewyn Peart
- "Looking out to Sea: New Zealand as a model for ocean governance" 2005 by Raewyn Peart
- "The Community Guide to Coastal Development under the Resource Management Act 1991" 2005 by Raewyn Peart
- "The Community Guide to Landscape Protection under the Resource Management Act 1991" 2005 by Raewyn Peart
- "Landscape Planning Guide for Peri-Urban and Rural Areas" 2005 by Raewyn Peart
- "A Place to Stand: The protection of New Zealand’s natural and cultural landscapes" 2004 by Raewyn Peart
