= Sanford (fisheries) =

Sanford Ltd is a New Zealand fisheries company, founded in 1904 and based in Auckland.

== History ==
The company was founded by Albert Sanford. Initially, Sanford was a sole fisher, hunting snapper in the Hauraki Gulf, operating from his cutter, Foam, a business which he began soon after moving to New Zealand in 1864. Sanford and his family moved to Pakatoa Island in 1870 and from there to Rākino Island, where the snapper catch was of higher quality. He sold freshly smoked snapper from his boat while moored at Queen Street Wharf in Auckland.

Demand grew and by 1881 Sanford was selling his fish from a building in Federal Street. By the early 1890s, business was so good that he was buying fish from other fishermen and selling them at a market he had established on the corner of Albert Street and Customs Street. Expansion beyond Auckland began in the 1890s, with a factory established in Thames and run by Sanford's son George.

In 1900 Sanford purchased a schooner, Minnie Casey, which was used as a trawler in the Hauraki Gulf. Four years later, Sanford founded a limited liability company, acting as managing director and board chairman of the board. By 1910, the company had expanded to Tauranga, and owned a chain of fish shops throughout Auckland. In 1924 work started on new headquarters at Jellicoe Street. In the same year Sanford was listed on the New Zealand Stock Exchange.

The 1930s and 1940s were hard for the company. It survived the Great Depression but its retail side was reduced to only a handful of outlets by the late 1930s. World War II saw more hardships, with the government commandeering boats for use as minesweepers. Business picked up slowly after the war, and regulation of the industry made growth slow. Sanford expanded through the purchase of two smaller companies, Union Fish & Ice and Waitemata Fisheries Ltd. Exports became a major part of the company's operations, with a burgeoning Australian market developing in the 1950s and 1960s, followed by exports to Japan. More overseas markets opened up during the 1970s.

The declaration of New Zealand 200-mile Exclusive Economic Zone in 1977 led to major changes for the company. Without the resources to fish the zone entirely by themselves, Sanford entered into joint ventures with Marissco of Singapore, setting up the joint venture company Sanmar Fisheries Ltd.

== Current practice ==
Since the 1980s, Sanford have augmented their ocean fishing with aquaculture, initially with oysters and now operating major mussel farms in the Marlborough Sounds. By the end of the 20th century, the company had become New Zealand's largest aquaculture company, with greenshell mussels, Pacific oyster farms in Northland, and king salmon around Stewart Island.

== Operations ==
As of 2024, the company operates 39 vessels and 223 aquaculture farms.

The company's interim CEO is Craig Ellison, scion of a prominent Ngāi Tahu family with deep links to the fishing industry. Ellison stepped in to the CEO role after some boardroom turmoil in late 2023 which saw former CEO Peter Reidie resign, followed by another member of the board.

Despite this, the company in 2023 recorded its best revenue in five years, at sightly over $NZ 550 million.
