= Howl of a Protest campaign =

Protests in New Zealand

- Part of protests against tax policy and protests against government
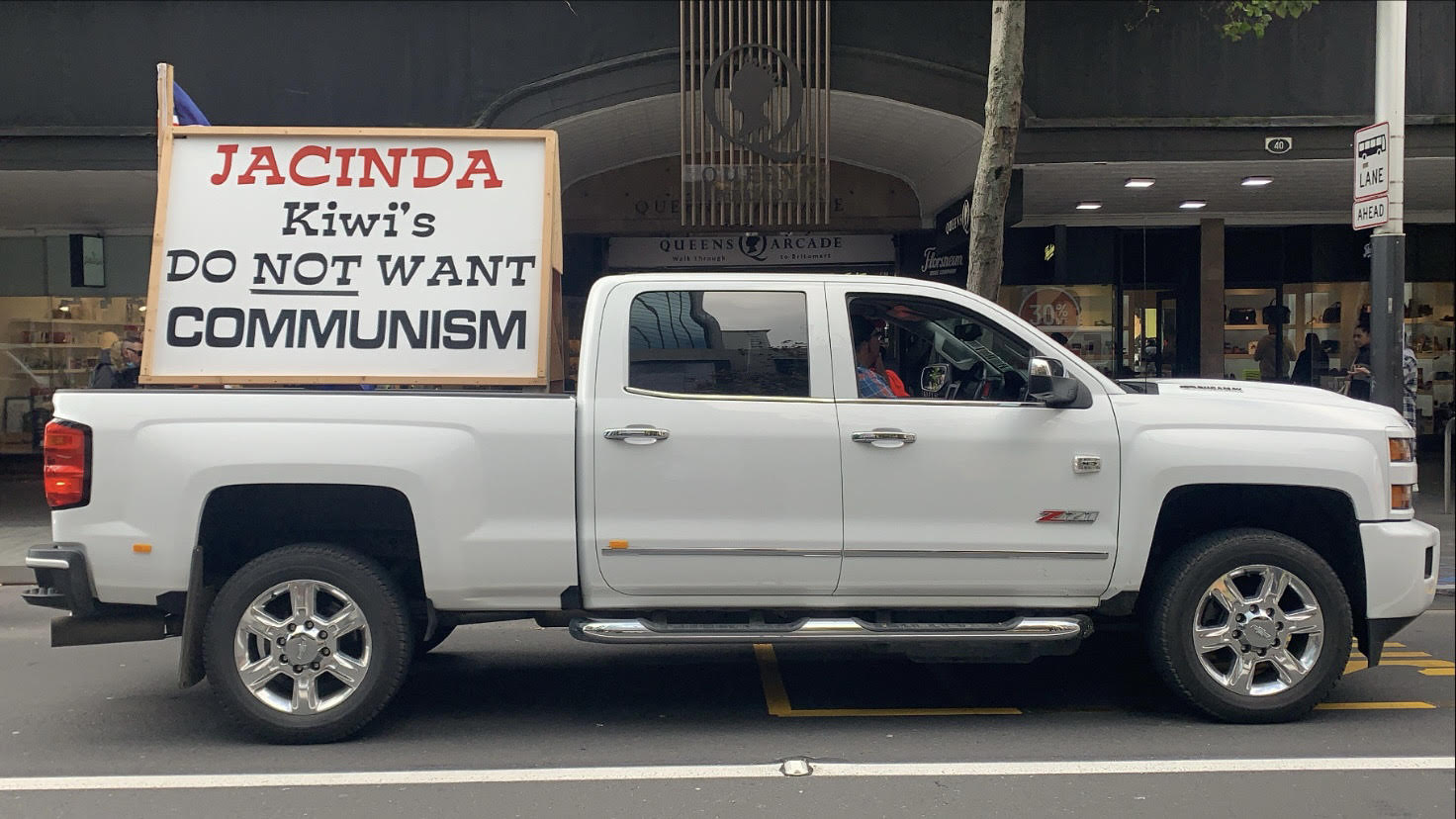
- A ute on Queen Street, Auckland protesting to New Zealand prime minister Jacinda Ardern that "Kiwi's do not want communism."
- Date: 16 July 2021
- Location: New Zealand
- Caused by: Opposition to the Government's freshwater, indigenous biodiversity, pastoral land, carbon emissions, and vehicle emissions policies.
- Goals: Elimination of the: Government's National Policy Statement on Freshwater; National Policy Statement on Indigenous Biodiversity; Crown Pastoral Land Reform Bill; "Unworkable elements" of the New Zealand Emissions Trading Scheme; Vehicle emissions incentive scheme
- Methods: Marching, driving utes and tractors along main streets.
- Result: Government disputes claims

Cities and areas that have had demonstrations.

The Howl of a Protest campaign were a series of peaceful protests in New Zealand which occurred on the 16 July 2021. The protests were organised by the farming advocacy group Groundswell NZ in opposition to the Government's new and proposed freshwater regulations, winter grazing rules, indigenous biodiversity regulations, and vehicle emissions feebate scheme (known by the group as the "Ute tax"). The scheme was particularly contentious among farmers, tradespersons and the agricultural sector since it proposed adding a fee up to $5,000 on motor vehicles with high tailpipe emissions in order to fund electric vehicle subsidies.

Cars and tractors used in the protests would particularly display signs showing opposition to Prime Minister Jacinda Ardern, Government funding of Mongrel Mob affiliated rehabilitation programmes, and a vehicle emissions feebate scheme popularised as a "ute tax".

== Background ==
The Howl of Protest campaign was organised by the farming advocacy group Groundswell NZ, which had been founded by two West Otago farmers named Bryce McKenzie and Laurie Paterson, who opposed the Labour Government's regulations on grazing, harvesting and freshwater use. In October 2020, the pair organised a tractor protest in the South Island town of Gore, which attracted 120 participants. Groundswell NZ became a national movement organised through the social media platform Facebook, with the number of followers growing from 900 in October 2020 to 14,000 by mid-July 2021.

In July 2021, Groundswell NZ organised the Howl of Protest campaign to express farmers, horticulturalists and tradespersons' opposition to the Government's freshwater, winter grazing, indigenous biodiversity and proposed vehicle emissions incentive scheme.

== Demonstrations ==
On 16 July, Groundswell staged protests in 57 cities and towns across New Zealand including Auckland, Christchurch, Dunedin, Mosgiel, Whangārei, Dargaville, Kerikeri, Kaitaia, Levin, Dannevirke, Te Awamutu, Amberley, Greymouth, Alexandra, Wānaka, Invercargill, Timaru, Gisborne, and Hastings. The only city that Groundswell left off the protest circuit was the capital Wellington, which organisers described as an intentional decision.

=== Auckland ===
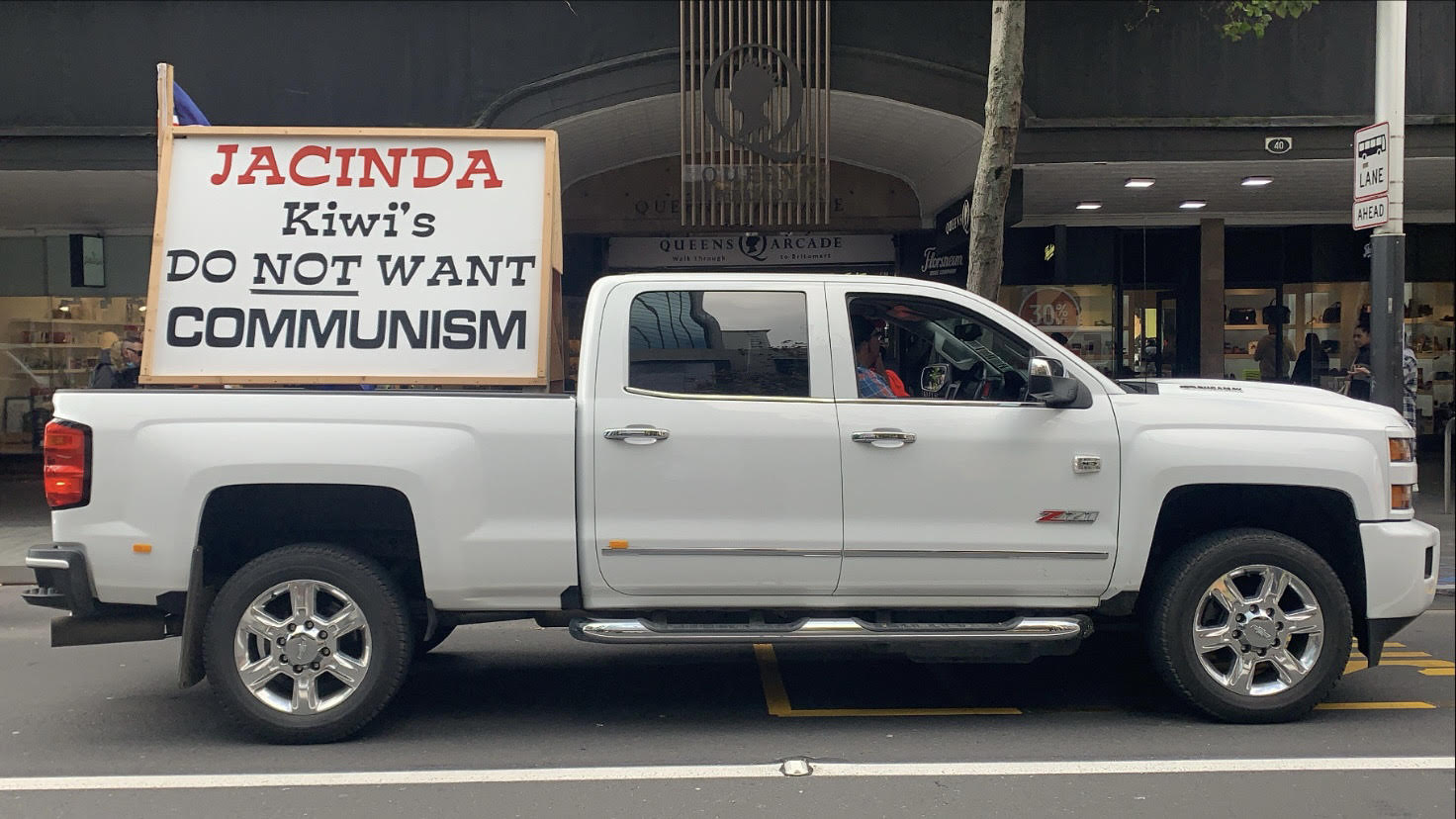
A ute on Queen Street, Auckland, protesting to New Zealand Prime Minister Jacinda Ardern, likening the government's reforms to communism.

On 16 July 2021, farmers engaged in peaceful protests across Auckland CBD. Tractors and particularly utes were seen driving down Queen Street in the morning and afternoon, tooting and displaying signs which showed criticism and resistance against Jacinda Ardern and proposed car tax laws. As a result, the Auckland Southern Motorway experienced congestion and delays.

=== Bay of Plenty ===
Farmers engaged in protests across the Bay of Plenty, particularly in Tauranga, Katikati, and Rotorua where several display signs described the government as out of control. The Katikati protest was jointly organised by Groundswell NZ and the KKCando Concerned Ratepayers. Some signs also mocking Jacinda Ardern's promise during the 2020 election campaign of "No new taxes."

=== Otago ===
In Otago and particularly Dunedin, farmers were seen driving around the Dunedin Octagon and in the CBD. It was reported that an estimated of over 100 tractors and utes met in Mosgiel for a briefing before driving into Dunedin to begin their demonstrations. The demonstration was met with opposition when a environmentalist protester was seen standing in the middle of George Street, they eventually had their sign stripped away.

=== West Coast ===
On the West Coast and particularly in Greymouth, it was reported that hundreds of tractors and utes came out to demonstrate in the town square. The protests caused minor congestion and traffic jams in and around Greymouth. Police were present to ensure the demonstration was safe and lawful.

=== Canterbury ===
In the Canterbury and Christchurch region, it was estimated that there were over 800+ demonstrators in and around towns and cities including Christchurch and Ashburton. There were hundreds of demonstrators also seen to be protesting on foot in Darfield, Canterbury with signs displaying opposition to electric vehicles.

In Timaru, South Canterbury farmers and tradespersons drove utes, trucks, and tractors through the city center to protest the Government's regulations.

=== Nelson and Tākaka ===
Protests were also held in Nelson and Tākaka in the South Island. The Nelson protest was organised by Andrina Cimino and involved a convoy of 300 utes and tractors driving through the town center. The Tākaka protest was organised by Averill Grant and attended by Tasman District councillor Celia Butler and National list MPs Maureen Pugh and David Bennett.

=== Whanganui ===
More than 500 people attended protests in and around Whanganui, with an estimate of about 150 tractors and utes circling the main city.

== Responses ==
Many protesters were criticized for their off-message protest signs, including ones described as misogynistic and racist. In response, organiser Bryce McKenzie disavowed the offensive signs as not representative of farmers' views.

=== Agricultural sector ===
The farming advocacy group Federated Farmers's national president Andrew Hoggard attributed Groundswell's protests to farmers' frustration and anger with the central Government's new regulations and costs. Hoggard also claimed that rural communities were experiencing a "winter of discontent" and described the so-called "ute tax" as the "straw that broke the camel's back" for many farming families.

The farmer Chris Falconer claimed that the Groundswell protesters did not speak for all members of the rural community and told Newshub that there were plenty of farmers who were not against all of Government's regulations.

The farmer-owned cooperatives including the rural supply company Farmlands and dairy processing company Fonterra drew criticism from protest supporters for telling staff they were not allowed to represent their company's brand at the "Howl of a Protest" event in mid-July 2021.

=== Politicians ===
The Groundswell's "Howl of a Protest" campaign received mixed responses. Minister of Agriculture Damien O'Connor stated that farmers had a right to speak their mind but warned that Groundswell's protests would create the perception that farmers were opposed to improving freshwater quality, addressing climate change, managing animal welfare, and not appreciating the Government's efforts to collaborate with the agricultural sector. Similar sentiments were echoed by Minister of Finance Grant Robertson who urged protesters to be respectful. Prime Minister Ardern defended the Government's commitment to the environment and brushed off suggestions of a rural-urban divide in New Zealand.

Both the National and ACT parties expressed support for the demonstrations. The National Party sent all their MPs across the country to show support and engage at the demonstrations, shortly before releasing a political advertisement slamming the government tax proposals. National Leader, Judith Collins spent the day at a demonstration in Blenheim, giving a speech stating "I will make it really clear. The next National government will not have the ute tax and won’t go after those people."

=== Media ===
The journalist Gordon Campbell, writing on the news site Scoop, questioned Groundswell NZ's claim to represent the majority of New Zealand farmers, claiming that most Southland farmers voluntarily complied with the Government's new winter grazing regulations. Campbell also claimed that farmers were a privileged group in New Zealand society.

Similarly, The Guardian columnist Philip McKibbin described the demands of the protesters as unrealistic, hypocritical, and anti-environmental. Broadcaster Jack Tame opined that the farmers' actions were hypocritical, citing that the farmers had received substantial Government assistance for addressing Mycoplasma bovis, irrigation subsidies, drought relief packages, flood relief and wage subsidies.

=== Others ===
Greenpeace Aotearoa New Zealand Executive Director and former Green Party leader Russel Norman accused the protesters of supporting the pollution of rivers and opposing the Māori language.

== Aftermath ==
In mid-August 2021, Groundswell co-founders Bryce McKenzie and Laurie Paterson announced a second round of protests in November called the "Mother of All Protests" after the Government refused to address the group's grievances around the Government's freshwater, indigenous biodiversity, and climate change mitigation policies. Co-founder Laurie Paterson stated that the second planned protest campaign was in response to the Government's refusal to address their concerns about freshwater and climate change mitigation policies. These protests were held across 70 cities and towns on 21 November 2021.
