= Groundswell NZ =

New Zealand farming advocacy group

Groundswell NZ's logo

Groundswell NZ is a farming advocacy group in New Zealand that was formed to oppose the New Zealand Government's National Policy Statement on Freshwater. The group has also sought to oppose or revise freshwater, indigenous biodiversity, climate change, pastoral land reform policies, and the Three Waters reform programme affecting farmers and rural communities On 16 July 2021, Groundswell NZ staged a nationwide Howl of a Protest campaign in between 47 and 57 cities and towns throughout New Zealand to protest what they regarded as "increasing Government interference, unworkable regulations, and unjustified costs" on the rural sector. On 21 November 2021, Groundswell NZ held a second series of nationwide protests known as the Mother of All Protests.

== Goals and positions ==
Groundswell NZ has advocated the elimination of the Labour Government's National Policy Statement on Freshwater, the National Policy Statement on Indigenous Biodiversity, the Crown Pastoral Land Reform Act, and so-called "unworkable elements" of the New Zealand Emissions Trading Scheme. In addition, the group called for overseas seasonal rural workers to be given priority in managed isolation and quarantine (MIQ) facilities in New Zealand.

Groundswell NZ has also called for the scrapping of the Government's Clean Car Package rebate scheme (the so-called "ute tax") on the grounds that there are no electric alternatives to utes, which are widely used by farmers, horticulturalists, industry support people, and tradespersons. The Government's Clean Car Package rebate scheme places a fee on higher-emission vehicles such as utes. Farmers and tradespersons regard the new rebate scheme as discriminatory.

In addition, the group has called for local councils to halt Resource Management Act planning processes, claiming that significant natural areas, wetlands and landscapes were having a negative impact on people and their property values. Groundswell has also urged landowners to deny access to councils or their agents wanting to undertake mapping or information gathering of their properties.

=== Carbon emissions ===
On 22 July 2022, Groundswell urged farmers and horticulturalists to boycott the Government's Agricultural Production Census until Statistics New Zealand agreed to use an emissions metric based on what the group considered "sound science" and a warming-effect approach. McKenzie claimed that the Government's current emissions metric was not suitable for the New Zealand agricultural sector. Farmers and horticulturalists who do not fill the Agricultural Production Census are liable for a maximum fine of NZ$500.

Groundswell NZ has opposed the Government's He Waka Eke Noa (a common Māori whakataukī, or proverb which means ‘we are all in this together’) (HWEN), a partnership between the Government and agricultural sector to reduce carbon emissions outside of the framework of the Emissions Trading Scheme. Groundswell claimed that farmers had not been properly consulted about HWEN and called for more work and research on the partnership scheme. In addition, Groundswell alleged that other farming lobby groups including Federated Farmers and DairyNZ were "pets" of the Government. In 20 August, Groundswell issued a press release claiming that Climate Change Minister James Shaw had conceded that the HWEN scheme was flawed and had abandoned it. The following day, Shaw clarified that the Government had not abandoned its He Waka Eke Noa scheme and that the Government was considering advice from the Climate Change Commission and officials. Shaw also reiterated the Government's commitment to working with the agricultural and horticultural sector to develop a "fair, effective system" for reducing carbon emissions.

=== Te Tai o Poutini Plan ===
On 25 July, Groundswell issued a letter in the West Coast Region criticising the draft Te Tai o Poutini Plan (TTPP) and calling for its withdrawal. The group claimed the provisions for "significant natural areas" and Māori sites of significance amounted to a land grab. While West Coast Regional Council chairman and TTPP member Allan Birchfield supported Groundswell's position, fellow TTPP committee member and Te Runanga o Makaawhio chairman Paul Madgwick described Groundswell's letter as "mischief-making" and argued that Māori sites of significance were an important part of the National Planning Standards.

=== Three Waters reforms ===
In November 2021, Groundswell expressed opposition to the Government's Three Waters reform programme, claiming it was "unworkable" and amounted to stealing ratepayers' assets. In December 2021, the group sponsored a petition calling for the abandonment of the Three Waters programme, which attracted 3,000 signatures by 15 December.

In June 2022, Groundswell and the New Zealand Taxpayers' Union co-organised a nationwide "roadshow" to rally opposition against the Three Waters reforms. This roadshow toured 36 cities and towns including Christchurch, Alexandra, and Invercargill.

== History and activities ==
Groundswell NZ was founded by two West Otago farmers named Bryce McKenzie and Laurie Paterson, who were opposed to the Government's regulations on grazing, harvesting and freshwater use. The group first attracted media attention in October 2020 when McKenzie and Paterson organised a tractor protest in the South Island town of Gore to protest against the Labour Government's new winter grazing and freshwater regulations. This protest attracted 120 participants. Groundswell NZ subsequently became a national movement organised through the social media platform Facebook, with the number of followers growing from 900 in October 2020 to 14,000 by mid-July 2021.

=== Protest activities ===
==== Howl of a Protest ====
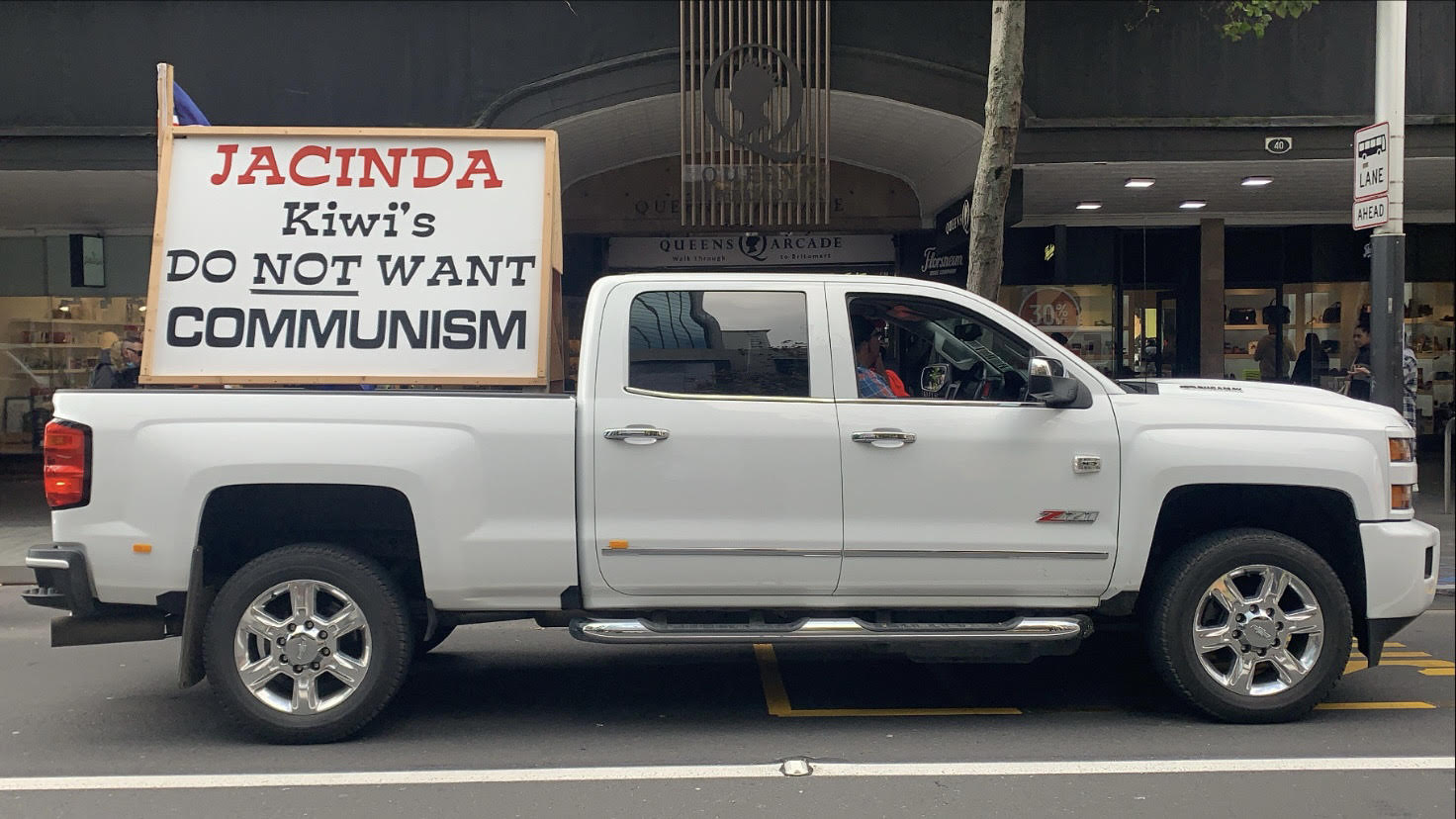
A ute parked on Queen Street, Auckland accusing Prime Minister Ardern of promoting Communism.

On 5 July 2021, McKenzie invited farmers across New Zealand to participate in a nationwide "Howl of a Protest" campaign on 16 July to protest the Government's new and proposed freshwater regulations, winter grazing rules and indigenous biodiversity regulations. Protesters were encouraged to bring their utes, tractors and dogs into towns across New Zealand ranging from Gore in the South Island to Kerikeri in the North Island. Protests were organised in 20 towns including Alexandra, Gore, Invercargill, Mosgiel, Oamaru, Greymouth, Blenheim, Thames, Hastings, Palmerston North, and Kerikeri.

On 16 July, Groundswell staged protests in 57 cities and towns across New Zealand including Auckland, Christchurch, Dunedin, Mosgiel, Whangārei, Dargaville, Kerikeri, Kaitaia, Levin, Dannevirke, Te Awamutu, Amberley, Greymouth, Alexandra, Wānaka, Invercargill, Timaru, Gisborne, and Hastings. The only city that Groundswell left off the protest circuit was the capital Wellington, which organisers described as an intentional decision. Pukekohe to Auckland organiser Scott Bright said that 50 tractors would be escorted by police along the Southern Motorway before progressing up the city into Queen Street. Bright also confirmed that vegetable growers would be donating three tonnes of vegetables to the Auckland City Mission.

In Christchurch, a Groundswell protest was diverted from the city's Cathedral Square due to the large number of participants. In Dunedin, organisers decided not to stop in the city but to instead drive through the city's Octagon at noon before heading to a speech in Mosgiel. In Dunedin, a counter-protester holding a sign which read "No farming on a dead planet" had it ripped from her by a bystander. National Party Member of Parliament Nicola Willis attended the Wānaka protest. Timaru's streets were occupied by hundreds of utes, trucks, and tractors as South Canterbury farmers and tradespersons protested the Government's regulations.

In Gisborne, protesters travelled in 350 vehicles on Gisborne's main road. Notable participants included All Blacks veteran Ian Kirkpatrick. The Hastings protest saw 800 vehicles drive through the city with one local organiser comparing it to the 1981 Springbok Tour. Protests were also held in Nelson and Tākaka in the South Island. The Katikati protest in the North Island's Bay of Plenty region was jointly organised by Groundswell NZ and the KKCando Concerned Ratepayers.

The protests wrapped up at 5pm New Zealand time. Auckland organiser Scott Bright claimed that the thousands of protesting farmers rallying together demonstrated "the seriousness" of the impacts of regulatory costs and the emotional toll on the rural community. Other participants drew attention to the importance of the farming community to the country's food security and expressed frustration with alleged Government "bullying." Organiser McKenzie stated that the Howl of a Protest campaign went "unbelievably well" and that feedback from the general public was positive. Though the protests were largely peaceful, media company Newshub reported that several participants had carried offensive signs expressing misogynistic attacks on Prime Minister Jacinda Ardern and attacking the increased use of the Māori language in New Zealand. McKenzie disavowed the offensive signs as not representative of farmers' views.

==== "Mother of All Protests" ====
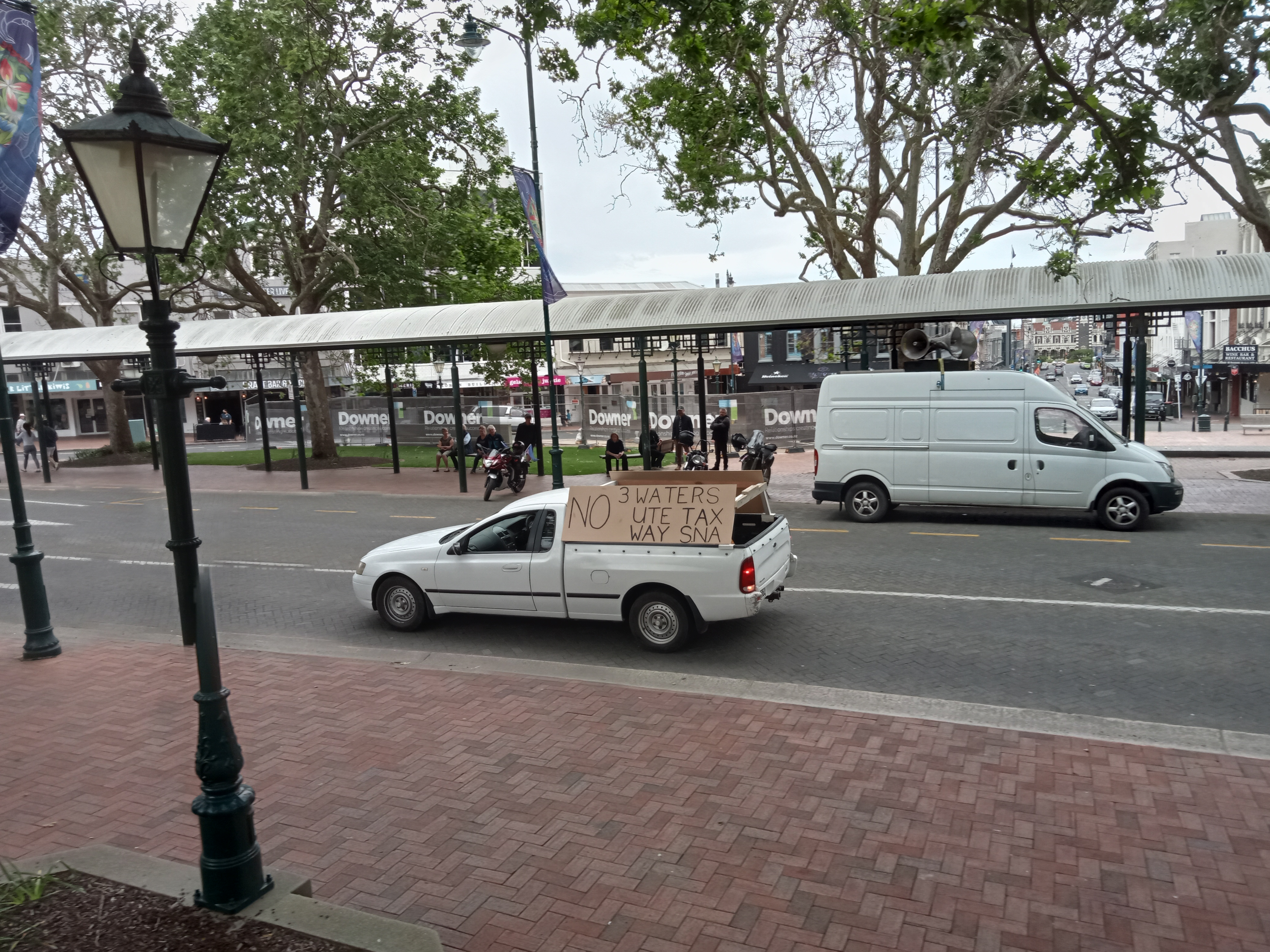
A ute participating in the Dunedin leg of the Mother of All Protests.

In mid August, Groundswell NZ co-founder Bryce McKenzie confirmed that the group would be organising a nationwide protest campaign in November 2021 to oppose allegedly "unworkable regulations" relating to freshwater, indigenous biodiversity, and climate change. Co-founder Laurie Paterson stated that the second planned protest campaign was in response to the Government's refusal to address their concerns about freshwater and climate change mitigation policies.

On 20 September, Groundswell NZ co-founder Paterson confirmed that the November protest would be known as the "Mother of All Protests" and would occur nationwide on 21 November. This protest campaign was intended to build a momentum for the "Groundswell Gathering" that would be held at the New Zealand Parliament in February 2022. After Prime Minister Jacinda Ardern and Minister of Agriculture Damien O'Connor declined to meet with McKenzie and Paterson, the duo confirmed that Groundswell would proceed with its "Mother of All Protests" campaign on 21 November.

On 21 November, Groundswell NZ held its "Mother of All Protests" across 70 towns and centres including Kaitaia, Whangārei, Auckland, Tauranga, New Plymouth, Taupō, Wellington, Nelson, Greymouth, Christchurch, Timaru, Temuka, Geraldine, Waimate, Fairlie, Alexandra, Balclutha, Bluff, Gore, Invercargill, Mosgiel, Oamaru, Palmerston, Queenstown, Stewart Island, Te Anau, and Wānaka. The Wairarapa protest was cancelled due to concerns that the event could be hijacked by anti-vaccination elements opposed to the Government's COVID-19 lockdown and vaccination policies. Groundswell also published a list of acceptable signage on its website to counteract the problem of racist and offensive messages during the previous "Howl of a Protest" rally.

==== 2022 Auckland protest ====
In early September 2022, Groundswell NZ organised a protest convoy in Auckland to protest Government regulations which they claimed breached privacy and property rights. On 1 September 2022, a small convoy of tractors and escort vehicles drove through Auckland City to the Auckland Harbour Bridge. In response, the New Zealand Transport Agency advised motorists to consider alternative routes.

==== 2022 Nationwide tractor protest ====
In mid October 2022, Groundswell announced that it would hold a nationwide tractor protest on 20 October to protest against the Government's plans to charge farmers for greenhouse carbon emissions from 2025. McKenzie described the carbon emissions pricing scheme as an "assault on food production and rural communities". Protest convoys were planned for the major cities of Auckland, Wellington, Christchurch, and Dunedin as well as several smaller centres including New Plymouth, Palmerston North, Gisborne, Blenheim and Invercargill. In South Canterbury, no protests were planned for smaller centres like Timaru with South Canterbury coordinator Roger Small encouraging participants to converge on Christchurch instead.

Protest numbers were smaller compared to earlier protests with low turnout being blamed on farmers being busy during that time of the year. Groundswell's October protests also attracted several activists from the anti-vaccination group Voices for Freedom (VFF). According to Stuff journalist Charlie Mitchell, leaders of both Groundswell and VFF had allowed VFF members to attend Groundswell protest. Mitchell attributed Voices for Freedom's support for Groundswell's protests to an "identity crisis" caused by the Government's lessening of COVID-19 pandemic restrictions, which prompted the VFF to look for new causes.

==== 2023 Drive for Change ====
In September 2023 Groundswell organised a Drive 4 Change event to travel north on State Highway 1 from Timaru to Christchurch as part of their drive all the way to Auckland. Co-founders McKenzie and Paterson were to do the whole trek, meeting up with local farmers to boost the convoy along the way and to protest what they describe as "unworkable" regulations imposed on farmers through Labour's climate policies. Their simple political message was “Things are bad, you need to vote, and you need to vote for change”.The event finished at the Ellerslie Racecourse in Auckland on October 1, where the ACT and New Zealand First leaders spoke.

=== Attempted meetings with Government figures ===
In late December 2021, Climate Change Minister James Shaw confirmed that he had agreed to meet the leaders of Groundswell in Southland in 2022 at the request of National Party MP Joseph Mooney. McKenzie confirmed that Shaw had agreed to meet them but had no settled on a date.

In February 2022, McKenzie confirmed that Groundswell had postponed its planned protest in Wellington due to the impact of adverse weather conditions on harvesting in both the North Island and South Island. McKenzie also criticised the Government's handling of the Convoy 2022 New Zealand's protest outside the New Zealand, taking exception to Speaker Trevor Mallard's decision to turn sprinklers on the protesters occupying Parliamentary grounds and play loud music at them. McKenzie argued that the Government was ignoring the concerns of anti-vaccine mandate protesters.

In March 2022, a spokesperson for Prime Minister Ardern confirmed that she would meet Groundswell leaders McKenzie and Paterson as part of a meeting with a range of industry leaders at an undetermined future date. McKenzie welcomed the Government's decision to enter into dialogue with Groundswell while stating he "was a bit disappointed to be lumped in with all the other sector groups."

In April 2022, McKenzie declined to meet Ardern with other farming industry bodies including DairyNZ and Beef + Lamb New Zealand, claiming it was difficult to get them to understand Groundswell's perspective. He also reiterated Groundswell's request for a solo meeting with the Prime Minister, which was declined. According to McKenzie, the group was focusing on the Government's HWEN partnership to reduce primary sector emissions and the Water Services Bill, which would affect rural properties.

On 17 November 2022, Groundswell delivered to MPs and Ministers at Parliament a petition to stop the government's proposed agricultural emissions framework. In mid November 2022, Stuff reported that the Climate Change Commission would meet with Groundswell members in Canterbury and Southland.

On 15 December 2022, McKenzie and Paterson finally met with Prime Minister Ardern, Agriculture Minister Damien O'Connor, Climate Change Minister Shaw, Deputy Leader of the House Kieran McAnulty and Associate Agriculture Minister Meka Whaitiri at Parliament in Wellington. McKenzie stated that the meeting went well and "gave it a six out of 10 for communication and about a two for achievement." A spokesperson for the Prime Minister stated that "there was a sharing of information and views, as is the case with the regular meeting she has with farming sector groups."

=== Golf balls at Fieldays ===
Groundswell sold golf balls with the faces of Prime Minister Hipkins and other ministers on them at the annual Mystery Creek Fieldays event in June 2023. "Drive Labour out - golf balls. The golf balls you won't mind putting in the bunker," advertising for the golf balls said.

=== 'Quit Paris' campaign ===
Groundswell intensified its campaign to have New Zealand leave the Paris Agreement by erecting roadside signs in July 2025. More than 30 signs with the message "The Paris Agreement is destroying us" were ordered by farmers and landowners with properties along State Highway One in the South Island, while signs were also erected along State Highways Two and Three in the North Island.

== Issues and controversies ==
=== Allegations of racism and misogyny ===
Groundswell NZ has attracted criticism for alleged racism and misogyny after several participants in its Howl of a Protests rallies carried racist and misogynistic messages. In response, co-founder McKenzie disavowed the offensive signs as unrepresentative of farmers' views. In response to the negative publicity, the group published a list of acceptable signage on its website prior to the Mother of All Protests campaign in November 2021.

On 16 November 2021, Groundswell's Hamilton organiser and Waikato dairy co-op Tatua director Ross Townshend drew controversy after he made an offensive social media post disparaging Foreign Minister Nanaia Mahuta. Townshend's actions were condemned by Groundswell co-founder Paterson, who reiterated that Groundswell was not a racist organisation and did not support his views. Townshend was all relieved of his role as the organisation's Hamilton organiser. In addition, Townshend resigned from Tatua. The company's chairman Stephen Allan also condemned Townshend's actions and issued a personal apology to Mahuta.

On 18 November 2021, Economic and Regional Development Minister Stuart Nash claimed that Groundswell NZ's website promoted racism and vaccine hesitancy in response to a question by ACT Member of Parliament Mark Cameron. In response, Groundswell co-founder McKenzie rejected allegations that the group was racist or anti-vax, emphasizing that he and Paterson were fully vaccinated against COVID-19. McKenzie added that the group had accepted the resignation of Groundswell member and Tatua director Ross Townshend for posting an offensive social media post of Mahuta. McKenzie also stated that the group regularly removed racist and anti-vaccine content from their social media accounts.

On 12 December, McKenzie and Paterson publicly distanced themselves from racist participants at Groundswell rallies during an interview with TVNZ journalist John Campbell on the 1News current affairs programme "Special: Anger, Anxiety & Us." The co-founders reiterated that the organisation was against Government over-regulation of farming and stated that participants who had attended Groundswell protests with racist and abusive signs attacking Māori and Prime Minister Ardern were not part of Groundswell. The pair also denied that they and their organisation were climate change deniers, with Paterson stating that climate change was happening while McKenzie acknowledging that they had difficult in checking people out in a nationwide movement.

=== COVID-19 ===
On 21 August 2021, Groundswell supporter Damianne Wells attracted media attention after she staged a lone protest outside the Unichem Alexandra Pharmacy in Alexandra, Otago. Her protest was in support of the organisation's campaign calling on people to "toot" in support of farmers for two minutes every Friday afternoon for the next three weeks, prior to the planned November protests campaign. Wells denied that her protest was motivated by opposition to the Government's lockdown policies in response to the Delta variant community outbreak.

In early November 2021, Groundswell co-founder McKenzie denied being an anti-vaxxer after he refused to participate in a Dairy NZ promotional video encouraging farmers to get vaccinated against COVID-19. McKenzie claimed that the organisation was not anti-vaccination but had decided not to comment on the issue to its followers "because it was a political and emotional issue they did not want to be a part of."

Stuff reported that the group's Pukekohe and Auckland coordinator Scott Bright had met with Destiny Church leaders Brian Tamaki and his wife Hannah Tamaki, who have regularly criticised COVID-19 vaccines and led anti-lockdown protests. Bright donated vegetables to The Freedoms & Rights Coalition (of which Tamaki is a co-founder) and participated in one of their protests, but claimed that he attended in his personal capacity.

On 28 August, Stuff reported that several Groundswell NZ activists including Whangārei convenor Tracy Thomasson and James Wolfen Duvall were also members of the anti-vaccination group Voices for Freedom, which has opposed the New Zealand Government's COVID-19 lockdown restrictions and vaccine mandates. Both Thomasson and Duvall have stood as candidates for the Whangārei and Tasman District Councils during the 2022 New Zealand local elections. Thomasson has shared social media posts expressing anti-vaccination sentiment, promoting the far right group Counterspin Media, and supporting the anti-vaccine protesters' occupation of Parliament. In response, Groundswell co-founder McKenzie stated that these individuals did not represent Groundswell's values and had used Groundswell as a means of furthering their own agendas. He also added that Groundswell had severed ties with Thomasson due to disagreements over the organisation's leadership direction.

=== Links to the NZ Taxpayers' Union ===
In November 2021, controversy emerged on social media after links to the New Zealand Taxpayers' Union, a right-wing pressure group became apparent after a registration to the protest's web address was listed as "NZ Taxpayer's Union". The registration subsequently was taken down and replaced with "THE CAMPAIGN COMPANY LIMITED", a business in the name of Jordan Williams, the organisation's director.

=== Links to Voices For Freedom ===
Groundswell has distanced itself from the Voices For Freedom movement. Members of the anti-vaccination group turned up in large numbers to October's Groundswell-organised protest against the government's proposal for a farm-level emissions pricing scheme.

=== Online petitions ===
On 11 November 2021, Meta Platforms (Facebook) apologised to Groundswell NZ for blocking links to a website launched by the group called "Enough is Enough," which allows people to send messages to Minister of Agriculture O'Connor about regulations that the group considers "unworkable." Meta explained that content had been mistaken for spam.
