= Mother of All Protests (New Zealand) =

The Mother of All Protests was a series of nationwide protests in New Zealand on 21 November 2021, organised by the farming advocacy group Groundswell NZ to oppose the government's rural sector regulations and policies. Protests took place in 70 cities and towns across New Zealand. Due to controversy around racist signage in the previous Howl of a Protest campaign, Groundswell issued a list of approved messages for participants.

== Background ==
Groundswell NZ was founded by two West Otago farmers named Bryce McKenzie and Laurie Paterson, who were opposed to the Sixth Labour Government's grazing, harvesting, and freshwater regulations, and proposed ute "tax." In October 2020, the pair organised a tractor protest in the South Island town of Gore. Groundswell NZ subsequently became a national movement that organised through the social media platform Facebook, with the number of followers rising from 900 in October 2020 to 14,000 by mid-July 2021. On 16 July 2021, the group staged the Howl of a Protest campaign in 57 cities and towns across New Zealand except the capital Wellington.

In mid August 2021, Groundswell NZ co-founder Bryce McKenzie confirmed that the group would be organising a second nationwide protest campaign in November 2021 to oppose allegedly "unworkable regulations" relating to freshwater, indigenous biodiversity, and climate change. Groundswell representatives also met with representatives from Beef + Lamb NZ, Federated Farmers, Dairy NZ, and Horticulture NZ to discuss collaboration on shared issues. Groundswell co-organiser Laurie Paterson stated that the second planned protest campaign was in response to the government's refusal to address their concerns about freshwater and climate change mitigation policies.

On 20 September, Groundswell NZ co-founder Paterson confirmed that the November protest would be known as the "Mother of All Protests" and would occur nationwide on 21 November. This protest campaign was intended to build a momentum for the "Groundswell Gathering" that would be held at the New Zealand Parliament in February 2022.

Following two unsuccessful attempts by McKenzie and Paterson to secure meetings with Prime Minister Jacinda Ardern and Minister of Agriculture Damien O'Connor, McKenzie confirmed that the group would proceed with their Mother of All Protests campaign on 21 November. By November 2021, the group's platform had broadened to include lobbying for seasonal workers to be given priority in managed isolation and quarantine (MIQ) and opposing Significant Natural Area (SNA) regulations, the proposed Crown Pastoral Land Reform Bill, and the Government's Three Waters reform programme.

== Demonstrations ==
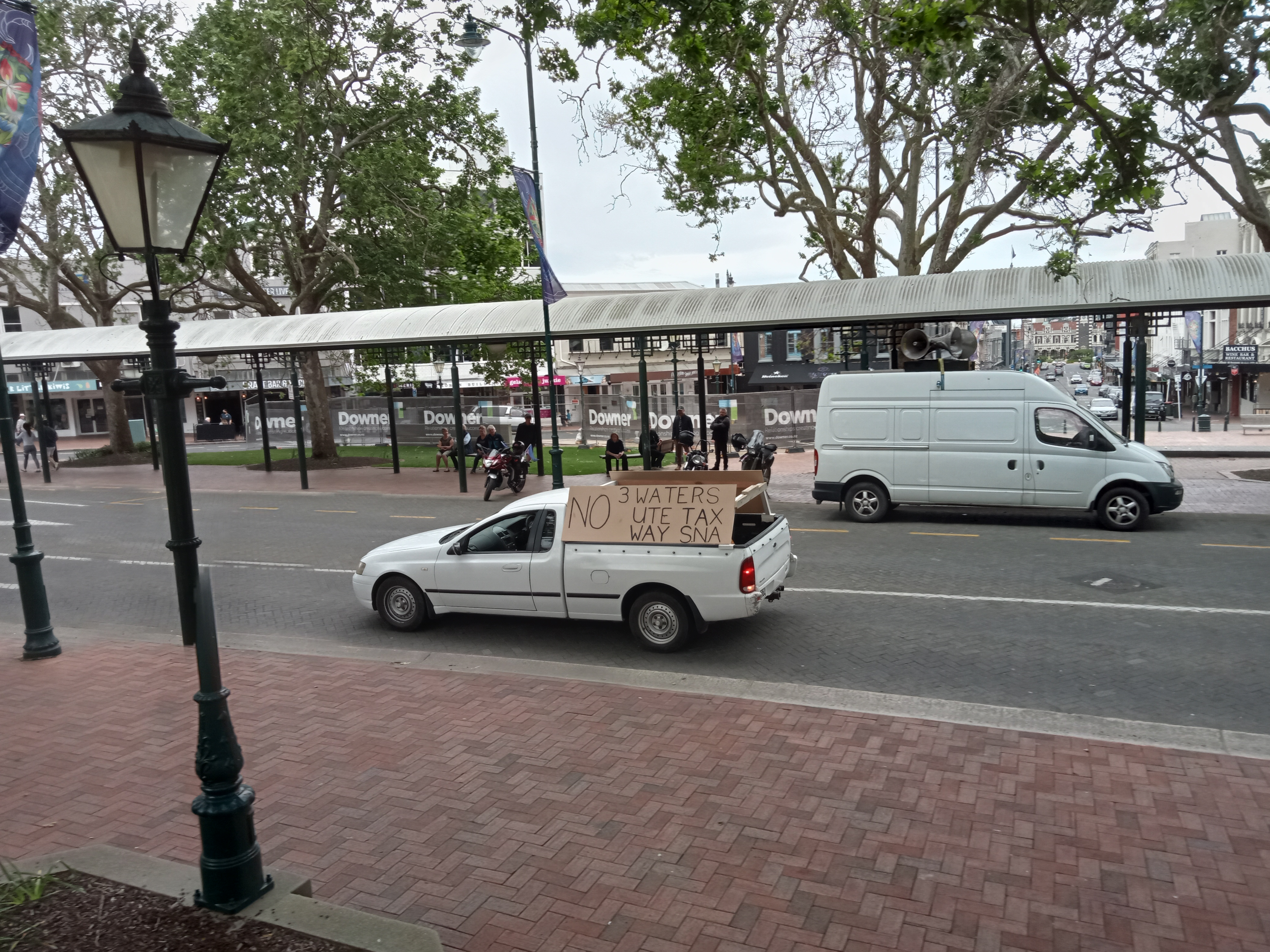
A ute participating in the Dunedin leg of the Mother of All Protests.

In mid-November, Groundswell NZ confirmed that it would be organising its "Mother of All Protests" on 21 November across 70 towns and centres including Kaitaia, Whangārei, Auckland, Tauranga, New Plymouth, Taupō, Wellington, Nelson, Greymouth, Christchurch, Timaru, Temuka, Geraldine, Waimate, Fairlie, Alexandra, Balclutha, Bluff, Gore, Invercargill, Mosgiel, Oamaru, Palmerston, Queenstown, Stewart Island, Te Anau, and Wānaka.

Per Groundswell's guidelines, their supporters were encouraged to drive into nearby town and city centres between 12pm and 1pm. Due to the ongoing COVID-19 pandemic in New Zealand, participants were instructed to remain in their vehicles, stick to social bubbles, comply with road rules and health requirements. To minimise the risk of Groundswell's protests being hijacked by anti-lockdown and anti-vaccination groups, participants were advised to remain in their vehicles and avoid street protests and gatherings. McKenzie would deliver Groundswell's statement nationwide on the radio channel Newstalk ZB following the 1:30pm news bulletin. Participants would then disperse. In response to the presence of racist and offensive placards at the previous Howl of a Protest rallies in July 2021, the organisation has published a list of acceptable signage on its website. In addition, McKenzie reached out to other protest leaders including Destiny Church leader Brian Tamaki to ensure that they did not interfere with Groundswell's activities.

The New Zealand Police have reiterated the right of individuals to lawful protests while cautioning participants to adhere to COVID-19 level restrictions within their areas. Motorists were also warned to expect traffic delays and disruption.

Despite the organisers' list of approved messages, some participants in New Plymouth and Auckland flew Donald Trump supporter flags and signs likening New Zealand's current situation to Apartheid, and pro-Trump message including "Make America Great Again." In addition, there were reports of racist signage including one opposing alleged Māori control and biculturalism.

Organiser McKenzie expressed satisfaction with the turnout at the "Mother of All Protests" and that the majority of participants complied with their guidelines.

=== Auckland ===
100 vehicles including several utes and seven tractors drove through the Auckland CBD. In addition, 30–40 protesters gathered on Queen Street and outside the Britomart Transport Centre. Several anti-vaccination protesters also gathered nearby.

=== Taranaki ===
The New Plymouth protest was coordinated by Kevin Moratti. 1,500 trucks, tractors, and utes drove laps around New Plymouth's CBD. While most placards criticised the Government's rural regulations and Three Waters programme, the Taranaki Daily News reported that some Trump and QAnon flags were being flown as well.

In addition, another Groundswell protest was held in Hāwera in South Taranaki. Barbara Kuriger, the Member of Parliament for the Taranaki-King Country and the National Party's agricultural spokesperson, attended the Groundswell protests. While sympathetic to the protesters, she expressed concern about anti-vaccination protesters hijacking the movement.

=== Wairarapa ===
On 18 November, Wairarapa organisers including Masterton farmer Derek Daniell cancelled the Wairarapa protest due to concerns that the event could be hijacked by anti-vaccination elements opposed to the government's COVID-19 lockdown and vaccination policies. Similar concerns were also expressed by Federated Farmers president Andrew Hoggard and King Country News Heather Carston, who emphasised that Groundswell was focusing on farming issues and expressed concerns about anti-vaccination groups diluting Groundswell's message.

=== Manawatū-Whanganui ===
About 80 vehicles gathered at the Whanganui racecourse to oppose the Government's farming regulations.

=== Wellington ===
The Wellington protest was organised by Hutt Valley coordinator Craig Innes. The Groundswell convoy drove from Petone to Wellington, with participants driving in laps around the New Zealand Parliament. Counter-demonstrators from environmentalist groups Extinction Rebellion and Generation Zero gathered nearby. Police monitored the protest and counter-protest, which remained peaceful. Some participants carried signs attacking Prime Minister Ardern.

=== Tasman-Nelson ===
Protests were held in Richmond, Nelson, Motueka, and Tākaka. A convoy of vehicles gathered in Richmond before 1pm before traveling to the Nelson CBD. They also donated food at the local Salvation Army before returning to Richmond.

=== Canterbury ===
In the Canterbury region, the Christchurch protest was organised by Aaron Stark. 300 vehicles drove from Rolleston to Christchurch. The convoy was escorted by Police. The Christchurch protest was also attended by ACT party leader David Seymour, who affirmed the party's support for rural New Zealand against alleged "counterproductive red tape on farmers." In addition, a protest was held in Ashburton.

In South Canterbury, protests were held in Timaru, Fairlie, Temuka, Geraldine and Waimate. 300 vehicles including utes and tractors drove through Timaru. The Timaru protest was led by co-organisers Stewart Hydes and Roger Small, the former of whom praised the turnout and criticised the Government's Three Waters reform programme. The Timaru event was also attended by Timaru District Mayor Nigel Bowen, who stated that the public were dissatisfied with the Government's lack of consultation on Three Waters. Some protesters sported signs likening the Government's policies to Apartheid and Communism. Small described these unapproved signs as unhelpful and stated that these protesters were not part of the Groundswell movement.

=== Otago ===
The Mosgiel-Dunedin protests was organised by Lucy Thomson. A convoy of tractors, utes, and farm vehicles drove from Mosgiel to Dunedin's The Octagon, driving laps and honking their horns. Loudspeakers were used to play a radio statement by Groundswell's national organisers for participants and members of the public in the Octagon.

In Oamaru, hundreds of tractors, utes, cars, sprayers and old fire trucks drove through the town centre to protest the Government's so-called "unworkable regulations" and the Three Waters reform programme.

In Queenstown, 70 cars and four tractors drove into the town centre. Queenstown organiser Grant McMaster claimed that farmers were unhappy with the Government's freshwater, indigenous biodiversity, natural areas regulations, Three Waters reforms, and lack of priority for seasonal workers.

=== Southland ===
According to Groundswell leader Laurie Paterson, 300 people had registered for the Gore protest but he estimated there were at least a thousand participants. The Groundswell convoy drove through the town centre, sporting protest signs against the Governments' Three Water reforms and methane regulations. The convoy attracted many local observers and supporters. Police were present to ensure the protest was peaceful. Paterson described the Gore protest as a success, citing the small number of offensive and racist signage. A separate group of anti-vaccination protesters also demonstrated nearby.

The Invercargill protest was organised by Bruce Robertson, who noted the presence of both rural and urban supporters whom he claimed were dissatisfied with the Government's Three Waters reforms, Clean Car Package, and "water tax." Utes, tractors, and a stream engine drove through the city centre. Several participants also highlighted mental health issues facing farmers as well was grievances with Government policies including the Significant Natural Areas, Three Waters, and winter grazing. 90 supporters also gathered in the Invercargill Cenotaph.

== Responses ==
=== Environmentalists ===
In mid November 2021, the Wellington chapter of environmentalist group Extinction Rebellion announced that they would disrupt the "Mother of All Protests" event in Wellington by blocking the group's tractors and vehicles in Lambton Quay. Spokesperson Te Wehi Ratana claimed that Groundswell was undermining efforts to combat climate change and to protect the planet. Activist Sue Boyd alleged that Groundswell NZ promoted racism, misogyny, and vaccine hesitancy, citing the presence of offensive placards in the previous Howl of a Protest campaign in July 2021. In response, Groundswell's Wellington organiser Tim Hawley rejected claims that the group was racist or promoted climate denial. He emphasised that the farming sector was seeking to address its environmental impact and suggested that critics watch the TVNZ series Country Calendar to understand the farming sector.

=== Farmers ===
Tokoroa dairy farmer Arianna Ashworth opined that the "Mother of All Protests" came at a "bad time" since Groundswell's message risk being muddled by anti-vaccination and anti-government elements. While Ashworth supported Groundswell's efforts to lobby the Government about policies adversely affecting the primary industry, she stated that Groundswell needed to address recent events such as racist signs at the Howl of a Protest campaign and former Hamilton organiser Ross Townshend's racist social media post about Foreign Minister Nanaia Mahuta.
