= Kerry Burke =

New Zealand politician (born 1942)

The Honourable Sir Kerry Burke

22nd Speaker of the House of Representatives
- In office 16 September 1987 – 28 November 1990
- Prime Minister: David Lange; Geoffrey Palmer; Mike Moore; Jim Bolger
- Preceded by: Gerry Wall
- Succeeded by: Robin Gray

41st Minister of Immigration
- In office 26 July 1984 – 24 August 1987
- Prime Minister: David Lange
- Preceded by: Aussie Malcolm
- Succeeded by: Stan Rodger

8th Minister of Employment
- In office 26 July 1984 – 6 April 1987
- Prime Minister: David Lange
- Preceded by: Office not in use
- Succeeded by: Phil Goff

Member of the New Zealand Parliament for West Coast
- In office 25 November 1978 – 27 October 1990
- Preceded by: Paddy Blanchfield
- Succeeded by: Margaret Moir

Member of the New Zealand Parliament for Rangiora
- In office 25 November 1972 – 29 November 1975
- Preceded by: Lorrie Pickering
- Succeeded by: Derek Quigley

Personal details
- Born: 24 March 1942 (age 84) Christchurch, New Zealand
- Party: Labour
- Children: 3
- Profession: Teacher

Sir Thomas Kerry Burke (born 24 March 1942) is a former New Zealand politician and Speaker of the New Zealand House of Representatives. He was a Member of Parliament for the Labour Party from 1972 to 1975 and again from 1978 to 1990, and later served twelve years on Canterbury Regional Council (Environment Canterbury) from 1998 to 2010.

== Early life and career ==
Burke was born in Christchurch in 1942. He attended Opawa Primary School and Linwood College. In 1960, he began three years of study at the University of Canterbury, after which he studied for a year at the Christchurch College of Education. He taught at Rangiora High School from 1967 to 1972. From 1969 to 1971 he was chairman of the Rangiora branch of the Post Primary Teachers' Association (PPTA) union.

== Member of Parliament ==
=== Third Labour government ===
New Zealand Parliament
Years	Term	Electorate	Party
1972–1975	37th	Rangiora	Labour
1978–1981	39th	West Coast	Labour
1981–1984	40th	West Coast	Labour
1984–1987	41st	West Coast	Labour
1987–1990	42nd	West Coast	Labour

Burke was first elected to Parliament as the Labour MP for Rangiora in the 1972 election. From 1973 to 1978 he was a Lincoln College Council member.

In the 1975 election, however, he lost his seat, and remained outside Parliament for three years.

=== Political interregnum ===
After his defeat he took consolation that the swing against him in his electorate was lower than the overall swing against the government. He also appreciated that leaving parliament would give him more time to spend with his sons. He decided to return to teaching, though found there to be no teaching vacancies in Canterbury at the time. This prompted him to move to the West Coast to teach at Greymouth High School from 1976 to 1978.

He established himself locally and when the local MP, Paddy Blanchfield, announced his retirement Burke sought the Labour Party candidacy. Despite facing criticisms as an outsider, he won the nomination over eight other candidates.

=== Opposition ===
In the 1978 election, Burke was elected as the MP for the West Coast electorate. After reentering Parliament he criticised the closure of several gasworks in his electorate as well as the resulting employee reductions at the Liverpool coal mine after subsidies for them were cut by the Muldoon government.

He was elevated to the shadow cabinet by Labour leader Bill Rowling in 1979 and was Shadow Minister of Labour and State Services from 1979 to 1980, Shadow Minister of Employment and Science & Technology from 1981 to 1982 and Shadow Minister of Employment, Regional Development and Tourism from 1982 to 1983. He supported Rowling when he was challenged for the leadership in 1980 by deputy leader David Lange.

When Lange replaced Rowling in 1983 Burke fell in the rankings and was left only with the regional development portfolio.

=== Fourth Labour government ===
When Labour won the 1984 election, Burke became Minister of Immigration and Minister of Employment. He held these roles until the 1987 election, when he was chosen to replace the outgoing Gerry Wall as Speaker. At 45 he was the second youngest Speaker in the history of the Parliament of New Zealand.

He served in this role for three years, losing the Speakership and his seat when Labour lost the 1990 election. In the 1990 New Year Honours, Burke was appointed a Knight Bachelor, and the same year he was awarded the New Zealand 1990 Commemoration Medal. He did not contest West Coast in the 1993 election; Damien O'Connor succeeded him as Labour's candidate.

== Local government career ==
After leaving Parliament, Burke returned to Canterbury. He contested and was elected to the Canterbury Regional Council (Environment Canterbury) in 1998, beginning what would be 12 years of service. He first became chairman in 2004 and was reelected to the chair after the 2007 local elections. On 24 September 2009, Burke lost a motion of no confidence and was replaced as chairman by former National MP Alec Neill. The council was removed in 2010 and replaced by Government-appointed commissioners. The reason cited for the sacking was due to poor direction, "woeful" performance and governance and an overall collapse of confidence in the organisation.

In the 2010 local elections, Burke stood for Christchurch City Council in the Spreydon-Heathcote ward but was beaten by the two incumbents (Sue Wells and Barry Corbett).

== Personal life ==
Burke had two sons with his first wife Jenny. He remarried with journalist Helen Paske in October 1984, with whom he had a third son in 1985. Paske died in 1989.

At one time Burke was patron of Cholmondeley Children's Home in Governors Bay. In March 2012 he joined the board of the Draco Foundation (NZ) Charitable Trust, an organisation whose purpose is the protection and promotion of democracy and natural justice in New Zealand. The trust was denied charitable status by the Charities Commission and on appeal by the High Court of New Zealand the Draco organisation was found to have no public benefit and was set up for political purposes.

In January 2016, aged 73, Burke was convicted of drink driving having 517 μg of alcohol per litre of breath. He was fined $400 and disqualified from driving for six months.

== Notes ==
Political offices
Preceded by Richard Johnson	Chair of Environment Canterbury; 2004–2009	Succeeded by Alec Neill
Preceded by Gerry Wall	Speaker of the New Zealand House of Representatives; 1987–1990	Succeeded by Robin Gray
Preceded by Aussie Malcolm	Minister of Immigration; 1984–1987	Succeeded by Stan Rodger
Vacant	Minister of Employment; 1984–1987	Succeeded by Phil Goff
New Zealand Parliament
Preceded by Paddy Blanchfield	Member of Parliament for West Coast; 1978–1990	Succeeded by Margaret Moir
Preceded by Lorrie Pickering	Member of Parliament for Rangiora; 1972–1975	Succeeded by Derek Quigley
