= Chris Auchinvole =

New Zealand politician

Chris Auchinvole JP

Member of the New Zealand Parliament for National Party list
- In office 26 November 2011 – 20 September 2014
- In office 17 September 2005 – 8 November 2008

Member of the New Zealand Parliament for West Coast-Tasman
- In office 8 November 2008 – 26 November 2011
- Preceded by: Damien O'Connor
- Succeeded by: Damien O'Connor

Personal details
- Born: Christopher John Auchinvole; 7 March 1945 (age 81) Prestwick, Ayrshire, Scotland
- Party: National
- Spouse: Elspeth

Christopher John Auchinvole JP (born 7 March 1945) is a Scottish-born New Zealand former politician. He represented the National Party in the House of Representatives from 2005 to 2014.

== Early years ==
Auchinvole was born in Prestwick, Ayrshire, Scotland, on 7 March 1945, and attended the Royal Military Academy at Sandhurst in England. He later moved to New Zealand and became a naturalised New Zealander in 1980. In New Zealand he has been involved with the export industry, and operated a company based on the West Coast. He has also been involved in the Uniting Church, becoming a lay preacher.

== Member of Parliament ==
New Zealand Parliament
Years	Term	Electorate	List	Party
2005–2008	48th	List	34	National
2008–2011	49th	West Coast-Tasman	42	National
2011–2014	50th	List	43	National

In the 2005 election, Auchinvole stood as the National Party's candidate for the West Coast-Tasman electorate. Despite reducing the incumbent's majority by 5,568 votes, he was unsuccessful. Nevertheless, he entered Parliament as a list MP, having been ranked 34th. In the 2008 election, Auchinvole won the electorate with a small majority beating Labour's Damien O'Connor who had represented the West Coast since 1993. Damien O'Connor regained the electorate in 2011 despite a record defeat for the Labour Party.

Auchinvole is a wedding celebrant, and officiated at the wedding in Parliament of fellow MP Tau Henare on 7 March 2012. He was a strong supporter of the Marriage (Definition of Marriage) Amendment Bill which sought to legalise same-sex marriage in New Zealand. His speech in support of the bill during its second reading was well received.

== Retirement ==
On 2 October 2013 Auchinvole confirmed that he would be stepping down at the 2014 election. Auchinvole was replaced for the 2014 election by Maureen Pugh, former Westland District mayor as the West Coast-Tasman candidate. However, she did not win the seat, but later entered Parliament on the list following Tim Groser's resignation. Following the 2014 election Auchinvole has retired with his wife to raise Highland Cattle on their West Coast properties in Moana near Lake Brunner on the West Coast.

New Zealand Parliament
Preceded by Damien O'Connor	Member of Parliament for West Coast-Tasman; 2008–2011	Succeeded by Damien O'Connor
