= Margaret Moir =

New Zealand politician

Margaret Moir QSO JP

Member of the New Zealand Parliament for West Coast
- In office 1990–1993
- Preceded by: Sir Kerry Burke
- Succeeded by: Damien O'Connor

Personal details
- Born: 9 September 1941 (age 84) Kimberley, Cape Province, South Africa
- Party: National
- Spouse: Derek

Margaret Moir QSO JP (born 9 September 1941) is a former New Zealand politician of the National Party. Previously, she was the elected chairman of the West Coast Regional Council.

== Biography ==
New Zealand Parliament
Years	Term	Electorate	Party
1990–1993	43rd	West Coast	National

Moir was born in Kimberley, South Africa, and was a businesswoman in Hokitika with her husband.

She represented the West Coast electorate in Parliament from 1990 to 1993, when she was defeated by Damien O'Connor. She is one of six one-term National MPs who were elected in a swing against Labour in the 1990 election. She was unsuccessful as a list candidate in the 1996 election. After leaving Parliament Moir served as a director of two state-owned enterprises: Timberlands West Coast Limited and MetService.

In 1993, Moir was awarded the New Zealand Suffrage Centennial Medal. In the 1995 Queen's Birthday Honours, she was appointed a Companion of the Queen's Service Order for public services.

Moir and her husband Derek now live in Akaroa. She was treasurer at Amy Adams' electorate office.

New Zealand Parliament
Preceded by Sir Kerry Burke	Member of Parliament for West Coast; 1990–1993	Succeeded by Damien O'Connor
