= 1993 New Zealand Labour Party leadership election =

New Zealand party leadership election

- 1 December 1993

45 New Zealand Labour Party members of the New Zealand Parliament 23 members needed to win
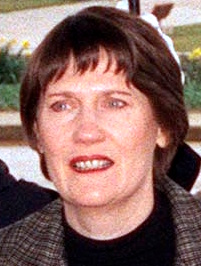

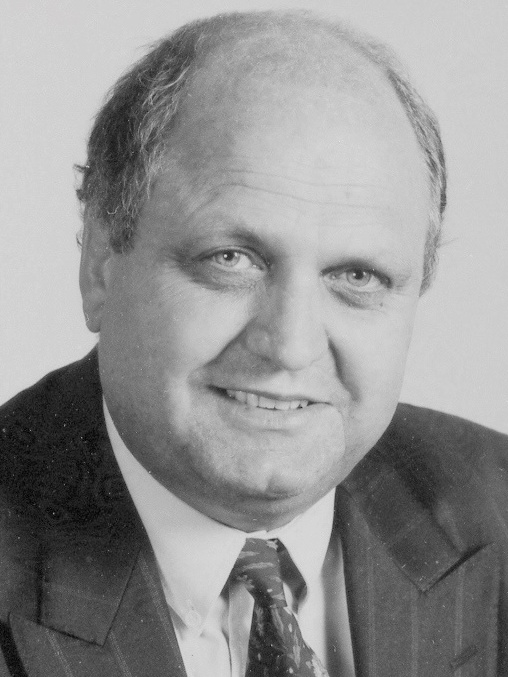
Candidate	Helen Clark	Mike Moore
Leader's seat	Mount Albert	Christchurch North
Popular vote	26	19
Percentage	57.77%	42.23%
- Caucus vote by electorate of member
Leader before election
Mike Moore
Elected Leader
Helen Clark

The 1993 New Zealand Labour Party leadership election was held to determine the leadership of the New Zealand Labour Party. The leadership was won by Mount Albert MP Helen Clark, who had been Deputy Leader of the party since 1989.

== Background ==
After their heavy defeat in 1990, enough right-wingers (supporters of Rogernomics) held their seats for Mike Moore to remain as leader. Despite a major swing back towards Labour at the November 1993 election, the party did not regain office. Despite the closeness of the margin it was Moore's second consecutive loss as leader, leading many to question his position.

== Candidates ==
=== Helen Clark ===
Clark had been Deputy Leader since 1989, first under Geoffrey Palmer, then under Moore. Since 1990 she had been Shadow Minister of Health and Labour. Clark had gained unrivalled influence over the wider Labour Party, but not the parliamentary caucus. In the run up to 1993, Clark and her allies (including former presidents Margaret Wilson and Ruth Dyson) who sat on the candidate selection panel had strategically installed likeminded candidates in nearly all winnable seats. Clark urged them to campaign alongside Moore but be primed to vote against him in the event of any post-election face-off. Clark was particularly critical of Moore for delivering blurred messages during the 1993 campaign and accused him of failing to re-brand Labour as a centre-left party which had jettisoned Rogernomics.

=== Mike Moore ===
Moore had served as Labour's leader since 1990. In 1993, by vigorously campaigning Moore managed to lead Labour to within two seats of snatching an unlikely victory over National only one term after their rout in 1990. However, Moore was disliked in large sections of the party, particularly among women. He was, unlike Clark, also closely linked with Labour's Rogernomics policies of the 1980s which helped fuel the growth of the Alliance party made up largely of Labour dissidents who were largely credited with splitting the vote enough to lose Labour the cliffhanger 1993 election. New party president Maryan Street asked Moore to step down voluntarily, but he refused forcing an open challenge.

== Result ==
A caucus vote was held on 1 December 1993 where a leadership ballot was moved by David Lange and (to the surprise of most) seconded by Moore. It was passed unanimously and chief whip Jonathan Hunt called for all those seeking the leadership to stand. Moore stood up, followed by Clark who won by seven votes. Now leaving the Deputy-leadership open, David Caygill stood and was elected 23 to 21 over Michael Cullen.

=== Leadership ballot ===
1993 New Zealand Labour Party leadership election
Candidate	Votes	%
Helen Clark	26	57.77
Mike Moore	19	42.23
Total	45	100.00
Helen Clark elected leader		

==== Breakdown ====
Breakdown of caucus vote
Clark	Moore
Rick Barker	Margaret Austin
John Blincoe	Geoff Braybrooke
Mark Burton	Michael Cullen
Chris Carter	Peter Dunne
David Caygill	Harry Duynhoven
Helen Clark	Jack Elder
Lianne Dalziel	Phil Goff
Ruth Dyson	George Hawkins
Taito Phillip Field	Judy Keall
Martin Gallagher	Annette King
Pete Hodgson	Clive Matthewson
Jonathan Hunt	Mike Moore
Graham Kelly	Damien O'Connor
David Lange	Ross Robertson
Janet Mackey	Jim Sutton
Steve Maharey	Peter Tapsell
Trevor Mallard	Elizabeth Tennet
Richard Northey	Whetu Tirikatene-Sullivan
Mark Peck	Koro Wētere
Jill Pettis	
Suzanne Sinclair	
Larry Sutherland	
Paul Swain	
Judith Tizard	
Jill White	
Dianne Yates	

=== Deputy leadership ballot ===
1993 New Zealand Labour Party leadership election
Candidate	Votes	%
David Caygill	23	52.27
Michael Cullen	21	47.72
Total	44	100.00
David Caygill elected deputy leader		

== Aftermath ==
Clark would lead Labour until she resigned in 2008. She went on to lose the next election in 1996, but would then win three consecutively (a record for a Labour leader) in 1999, 2002 and 2005. Moore did not take the loss gracefully and was a constant agitator in Labour's ranks until his retirement in 1999. During that time he was Labour's spokesman on Foreign Affairs and Trade.

A noted critic of Clark's ousting of Moore as Labour leader was former Labour Prime Minister Norman Kirk's widow Ruth, who famously rang a Christchurch talkback radio show in 1993 to voice her fury at the episode. Damien O'Connor (a new MP in 1993) said in 2018 that his decision to support Moore over Clark would set his career back a decade, saying that he was the only one of Labour's 14 newly elected MPs to vote for Moore. Former Labour Prime Minister Bill Rowling was supportive of Clark replacing Moore for the leadership. He stated he felt Clark's style of leadership would be better suited to working with other parties such as the Alliance, which would be necessary under Mixed-member proportional representation (MMP), which New Zealand voted for in a 1993 referendum.
