= Minister for Racing (New Zealand) =

New Zealand political office

- Coat of arms of New Zealand

- Flag of New Zealand

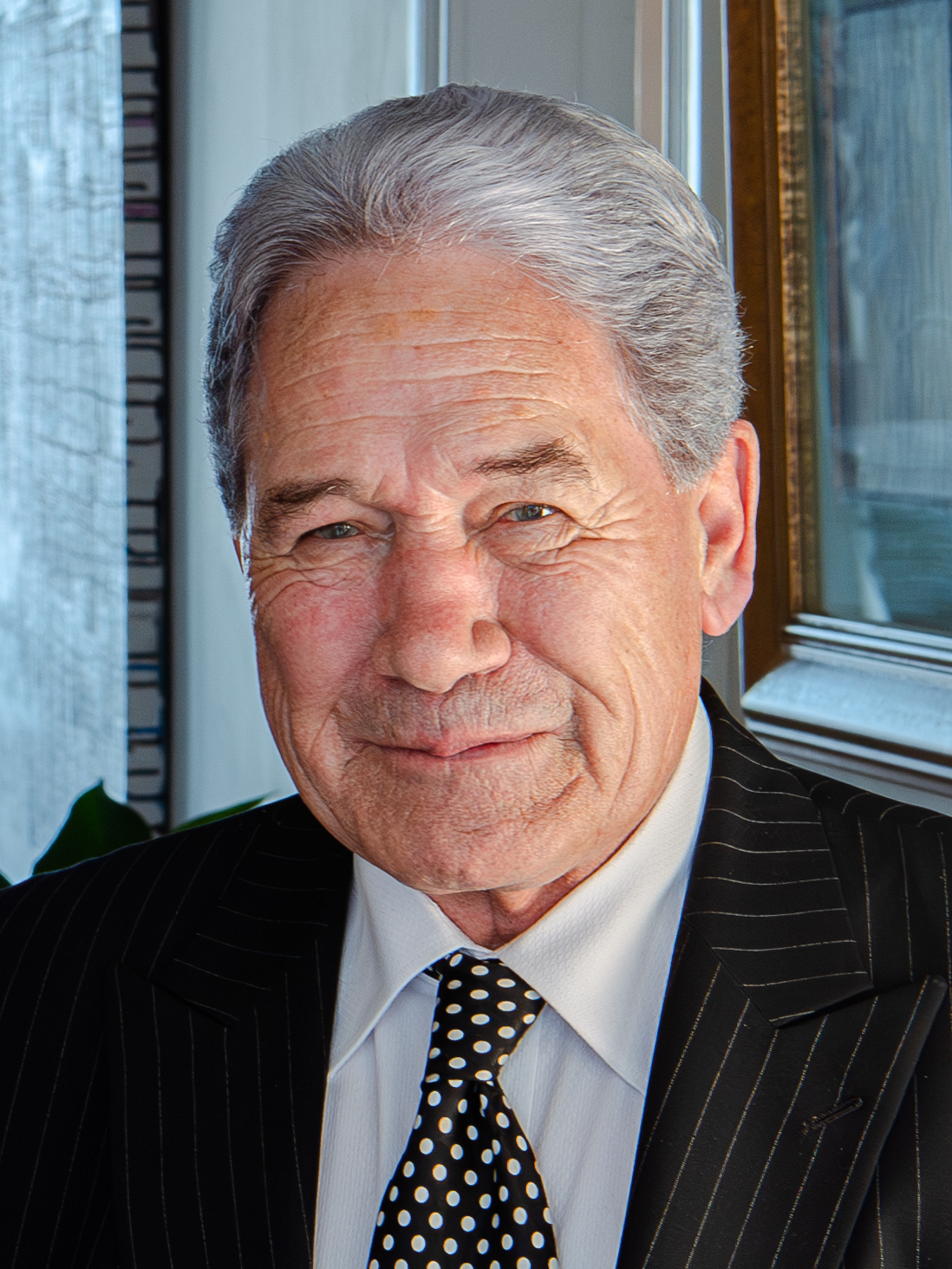
- Incumbent; Winston Peters since 27 November 2023
- New Zealand Racing Board; Totalisator Agency Board
- Style: The Honourable
- Member of: Cabinet of New Zealand; Executive Council
- Reports to: Prime Minister of New Zealand
- Appointer: Governor-General of New Zealand
- Term length: At His Majesty's pleasure
- Formation: 2 November 1990
- First holder: John Falloon
- Salary: $288,900
- Website: www.beehive.govt.nz

The minister for racing is a minister in the New Zealand Government with responsibility for the regulation of the racing industry and betting services. The minister is also responsible for the New Zealand Racing Board, Racing Industry Transition Agency and Totalisator Agency Board (TAB).

The current minister is Winston Peters, the leader of New Zealand First. He has held the office on three occasions.

== List of ministers for racing ==
The following ministers have held the office of Minister for Racing.

Key

Labour National NZ First Mauri Pacific

| No. | Name | Portrait | Term of office | | Prime Minister |
|---|---|---|---|---|---|
| 1 | John Falloon | | 2 November 1990 | 8 November 1996 | Bolger |
| 2 | Denis Marshall | | 8 November 1996 | 16 December 1996 | Bolger |
| 3 | Tau Henare | | 16 December 1996 | 31 August 1998 | Bolger |
| 3 | Tau Henare | | 16 December 1996 | 31 August 1998 | Shipley |
| 4 | Clem Simich | | 31 August 1998 | 10 December 1999 | Shipley |
| 5 | Annette King | | 10 December 1999 | 15 August 2002 | Clark |
| 6 | Mark Gosche | | 15 August 2002 | 12 May 2003 | Clark |
| 7 | Damien O'Connor | | 12 May 2003 | 19 October 2005 | Clark |
| 8 | Winston Peters | | 19 October 2005 | 19 November 2008 | Clark |
| 9 | John Carter | | 19 November 2008 | 8 June 2011 | Key |
| 10 | Craig Foss | | 8 June 2011 | 13 December 2011 | Key |
| 11 | Nathan Guy | | 13 December 2011 | 2 May 2017 | Key |
| 11 | Nathan Guy | | 13 December 2011 | 2 May 2017 | English |
| 12 | David Bennett | | 2 May 2017 | 26 October 2017 | English |
| (8) | Winston Peters | | 26 October 2017 | 6 November 2020 | Ardern |
| 13 | Grant Robertson | | 6 November 2020 | 14 June 2022 | Ardern |
| 14 | Kieran McAnulty | | 14 June 2022 | 27 November 2023 | Ardern |
| 14 | Kieran McAnulty | | 14 June 2022 | 27 November 2023 | Hipkins |
| (8) | Winston Peters | | 27 November 2023 | Incumbent | Luxon |

== See also ==
- New Zealand Racing Board
- Totalisator Agency Board
