= West Coast-Tasman =

- Single-member general constituency for the New Zealand House of Representatives
- Interactive map of boundaries from the 2026 election
- Formation: 1996
- Region: West Coast Tasman
- Character: Rural
- Term: 3 years

Member for West Coast-Tasman
- Katie Milne since 7 November 2026
- Party: National
- List MPs: Damien O'Connor (Labour)
- Previous MP: Damien O'Connor (Labour)
Party vote distribution

West Coast-Tasman is a New Zealand parliamentary electorate, currently held by Maureen Pugh of the New Zealand National Party as of the 2023 general election. West Coast-Tasman is the largest general electorate in the entire country, with an area larger than the entirety of Belgium. It comprises the entirety of the West Coast Region and the Tasman District, excluding Richmond and Hope (which form part of the Nelson electorate).

Historically it has often been regarded as one of the safest New Zealand Labour Party seats in the entire country. From its creation for the 1996 election until 2023, it was held by Damien O'Connor of the Labour Party, with the exception of one parliamentary term under National's Chris Auchinvole (between 2008 and 2011).

== Population centres ==
Map of boundaries at the 2020 and 2023 general elections

West Coast-Tasman is the largest general electorate in New Zealand, covering 32,758 km^{2} (12,648 sq mi). It is one of the longest. The Representation Commission last adjusted the boundaries in the 2007 review, which first applied at the 2008 election, when the northern boundary moved closer to Nelson, and Wakefield, Foxhill and Belgrove were added. The electorate was not changed in the 2013/14 review. Brightwater was added from Nelson at the 2020 redistribution.

The electorate includes the following population centres:

- Collingwood
- Tākaka
- Motueka
- Tapawera
- Brightwater
- Wakefield
- Westport
- Reefton
- Greymouth
- Hokitika
- Ross
- Hari Hari
- Whataroa
- Franz Josef / Waiau
- Fox Glacier
- Haast

== History ==
The electorate was formed in 1996 for the mixed-member proportional (MMP) voting system by combining the former Tasman and West Coast electorates.

Damien O'Connor was the first representative and he held the electorate until the 2008 general election, when he was beaten by National candidate Chris Auchinvole, who had previously been a list MP. Auchinvole's majority was 971. His position on the Labour Party list meant that O'Connor couldn't return to Parliament immediately. When the list MP Michael Cullen retired in May 2009, O'Connor regained his position as Member of the House of Representatives because he was the highest-ranked candidate on the list not already an MP. In contrast to the overall trend, he regained the electorate in the 2011 election.

Auchinvole retired from politics at the end of the 2011–2014 parliamentary term, and former Mayor of Westland District, Maureen Pugh, gained the nomination for the National Party. O'Connor was once again successful. Based on preliminary results for the 2014 election, Pugh was the lowest-ranked National Party list member who was returned to Parliament, but when the final results were released two weeks later, National had lost one list seat and Pugh did not get returned to Parliament.

=== Members of Parliament ===
West Coast-Tasman has been represented by three electorate MPs so far:

Key

Labour National Green

Election	Winner
1996 election	Damien O'Connor
1999 election	Damien O'Connor
2002 election	Damien O'Connor
2005 election	Damien O'Connor
2008 election	Chris Auchinvole
2011 election	Damien O'Connor
2014 election	Damien O'Connor
2017 election	Damien O'Connor
2020 election	Damien O'Connor
2023 election	Maureen Pugh

=== List MPs ===
Members of Parliament elected from party lists in elections where that person also unsuccessfully contested the West Coast-Tasman electorate. Unless otherwise stated, all MPs terms began and ended at general elections.

Election	Winner
1996 election	Owen Jennings
2005 election	Chris Auchinvole
2008 election	Kevin Hague
2009	Damien O'Connor^{1}
2011 election	Chris Auchinvole
2011 election	Kevin Hague
2014 election	Kevin Hague^{2}
2016	Maureen Pugh^{3}
2018	Maureen Pugh^{4}
2020 election	Maureen Pugh
2023 election	Damien O'Connor

^{1}In the 2008 election Damien O'Connor's list position of 37 meant he was not returned until Michael Cullen resigned in May 2009.
^{2}Kevin Hague resigned from Parliament on 7 October 2016.
^{3}Maureen Pugh's list position of 52 meant she became elected after Tim Groser resigned in December 2015. She assumed office in early 2016 and was not returned to Parliament at the 2017 election, until the resignation of Bill English.
^{4}Maureen Pugh's list position of 44 meant she became elected after Bill English resigned in February 2018. She assumed office in early 2018.

== Election results ==
=== 2026 election ===
The next election will be held on 7 November 2026. Candidates for West Coast-Tasman are listed at Candidates in the 2026 New Zealand general election by electorate § West Coast-Tasman. Official results will be available after 27 November 2026.

=== 2023 election ===
2023 general election: West Coast-Tasman
Notes:	Blue background denotes the winner of the electorate vote. Pink background denotes a candidate elected from their party list. Yellow background denotes an electorate win by a list member, or other incumbent. A ✓ or ✗ denotes status of any incumbent, win or lose respectively.						
Party	Candidate	Votes	%	±%	Party votes	%	±%
National	Maureen Pugh	13,317	32.01	-1.48	14,042	33.45	+8.35
Labour	✗ Damien O'Connor	12,300	29.57	−18.22	9,970	23.75	−23.25
Independent	Patrick Phelps	5,903	14.19	+14.19			
Green	Steve Richards	2,743	6.59	+1.20	4,521	10.77	+2.59
ACT	Kelly Lilley	2,520	6.05	+2.71	5,488	13.07	+3.36
NZ First	Jackie Farrelly	1,799	4.32	+2.75	4,154	9.89	+6.95
Outdoors	Sue Grey	1,554	3.73	+3.73			
NZ Loyal	Sebastian Markinovic	618	1.42	+1.42	1,489	3.54	+3.54
Money Free Party	Richard Osmaston	88	0.21	+0.06			
Opportunities					792	1.88	+0.62
Te Pāti Māori					290	0.69	+0.49
Freedoms NZ					289	0.68	+0.68
Legalise Cannabis					281	0.66	+0.09
NewZeal					254	0.60	+0.60
DemocracyNZ					136	0.32	+0.32
Animal Justice					99	0.23	+0.23
New Conservatives					63	0.15	−1.52
Women's Rights					46	0.10	+0.10
Leighton Baker Party					40	0.09	+0.09
New Nation					19	0.04	+0.04
Informal votes		311			236		
Total valid votes		41,905			42,209		
National gain from Labour	Majority	1,017	2.44				

=== 2020 election ===
2020 general election: West Coast-Tasman
Notes:	Blue background denotes the winner of the electorate vote. Pink background denotes a candidate elected from their party list. Yellow background denotes an electorate win by a list member, or other incumbent. A ✓ or ✗ denotes status of any incumbent, win or lose respectively.						
Party	Candidate	Votes	%	±%	Party votes	%	±%
Labour	✓ Damien O'Connor	20,753	47.79	−1.75	20,521	47.0	+10.00
National	Maureen Pugh	14,545	33.49	−1.06	10,934	25.1	−14.8
Green	Steve Richards	2,341	5.39	−0.59	3,572	8.18	−0.08
ACT	William Stuart Gardner	1,454	3.34	+2.93	4,237	9.71	+9.35
Advance NZ	Anne Fitzsimon	717	1.65	—	747	1.71	—
Independent	Peter Ewen	697	1.60	—			
NZ First	Jackie Farrelly	685	1.57	−3.22	1,281	2.94	−6.43
Outdoors	Luke King	618	1.42	—	229	0.52	+0.42
New Conservative	Karl Barkley	606	1.39	—	730	1.67	+1.41
Independent	Cory Aitken	201	0.46	—			
Social Credit	Jack Collin	141	0.32	+0.22	78	0.17	+0.11
Money Free Party	Richard Osmaston	69	0.15				
Opportunities					553	1.26	−1.34
Legalise Cannabis					250	0.57	+0.11
Māori Party					88	0.20	+0.13
ONE					60	0.13	—
Sustainable NZ					33	0.07	—
Vision NZ					21	0.04	—
TEA					8	0.01	—
Heartland					5	0.01	—
Informal votes		596			288		
Total valid votes		43,423			43,635		
Turnout		43,635					
Labour hold	Majority	6,208	14.29	−0.70			

=== 2017 election ===
2017 general election: West Coast-Tasman
Notes:	Blue background denotes the winner of the electorate vote. Pink background denotes a candidate elected from their party list. Yellow background denotes an electorate win by a list member, or other incumbent. A ✓ or ✗ denotes status of any incumbent, win or lose respectively.						
Party	Candidate	Votes	%	±%	Party votes	%	±%
Labour	✓ Damien O'Connor	18,488	49.54	+2.74	14,015	37.0	+13.60
National	Maureen Pugh (Note: Maureen Pugh's list position of 44 meant she became elected after Bill English resigned in February 2018. She assumed office in early 2018.)	12,895	34.55	−0.81	15,122	39.9	−4.45
Green	Kate Fulton	2,230	5.98	−0.69	3,117	8.26	−4.66
NZ First	Jackie Farrelly	1,787	4.79	—	3,536	9.37	+0.61
Ban 1080	Pete Salter	1,470	3.94	−2.54	359	0.95	−0.66
ACT	Zeb Markland	154	0.41	—	137	0.36	+0.10
Independent	Steven Wilkinson	137	0.37	−0.27			
GOdsownNZ	Claire Holley	72	0.19	−2.69 (Note: Claire Holley contested the electorate in 2014 as a candidate for the Conservative Party)			
Money Free	Liam Anderson	50	0.13	—			
Democrats	Jack Collin	38	0.10	—	21	0.06	−0.01
Opportunities					982	2.60	—
Legalise Cannabis					173	0.46	−0.12
Conservative					97	0.26	−4.84
Māori Party					73	0.19	−0.09
Outdoors					36	0.10	–
United Future					26	0.07	−0.13
People's Party					18	0.05	—
Mana					10	0.03	−0.72 (Note: 2017 Mana Party swing is relative to the votes for Internet-Mana in 2014; it shared a party list with the Internet Party in the 2014 election)
Internet					2	0.01	−0.74 (Note: 2017 Internet Party swing is relative to the votes for Internet-Mana in 2014; it shared a party list with Mana Party in the 2014 election)
Informal votes		302			149		
Total valid votes		37,321			37,724		
Turnout		37,873					
Labour hold	Majority	5,593	14.99	+3.55			

=== 2014 election ===
2014 general election: West Coast-Tasman
Notes:	Blue background denotes the winner of the electorate vote. Pink background denotes a candidate elected from their party list. Yellow background denotes an electorate win by a list member, or other incumbent. A ✓ or ✗ denotes status of any incumbent, win or lose respectively.						
Party	Candidate	Votes	%	±%	Party votes	%	±%
Labour	✓ Damien O'Connor	16,747	46.80	−0.71	8,438	23.40	−3.85
National	Maureen Pugh (Note: Maureen Pugh's list position of 52 meant she became elected after Tim Groser resigned in December 2015. She assumed office in early 2016.)	12,653	35.36	−4.49	16,058	44.54	−1.25
Green	Kevin Hague	2,385	6.67	+0.23	4,658	12.92	−1.26
Ban 1080	Pete Salter	2,318	6.48	+6.48	942	2.61	+2.61
Conservative	Claire Holley	1,031	2.88	+1.00	1,837	5.10	+1.92
Independent	Steven Wilkinson	228	0.64	−0.72 (Note: Steven Wilkinson contested the electorate in 2011 as a candidate for the Aotearoa Legalise Cannabis Party)			
Money Free	Laurence Bloomert	50	0.14	+0.14			
NZ First					3,123	8.66	+2.94
Internet Mana					271	0.75	+0.48
Legalise Cannabis					210	0.58	−0.16
Māori Party					102	0.28	−0.15
ACT					94	0.26	−0.56
United Future					71	0.20	−1.19
Democrats					25	0.07	−0.03
Independent Coalition					14	0.04	+0.04
Civilian					11	0.03	+0.03
Focus					7	0.02	+0.02
Informal votes		373			192		
Total valid votes		35,785			36,053		
Labour hold	Majority	4,094	11.44	+3.78			

=== 2011 election ===
2011 general election: West Coast-Tasman
Notes:	Blue background denotes the winner of the electorate vote. Pink background denotes a candidate elected from their party list. Yellow background denotes an electorate win by a list member, or other incumbent. A ✓ or ✗ denotes status of any incumbent, win or lose respectively.						
Party	Candidate	Votes	%	±%	Party votes	%	±%
Labour	Damien O'Connor	15,753	47.51	+3.85	9,200	27.25	-6.22
National	✗ Chris Auchinvole	13,214	39.85	−6.66	15,462	45.79	+1.72
Green	Kevin Hague	2,123	6.40	+0.23	4,787	14.18	+3.32
Conservative	Claire Holley	623	1.88	+1.88	1,075	3.18	+3.18
ACT	Allan Birchfield	487	1.47	+1.47	278	0.82	−1.34
United Future	Clyde Graf	454	1.37	+0.63	468	1.39	+0.23
Legalise Cannabis	Steven Wilkinson	450	1.36	−0.47	249	0.74	+0.14
Youth	Robert Terry	52	0.16	+0.01			
NZ First					1,931	5.72	+1.91
Māori Party					145	0.43	−0.20
Mana					91	0.27	+0.27
Democrats					33	0.10	−0.01
Libertarianz					31	0.09	+0.03
Alliance					16	0.05	−0.04
Informal votes		628			288		
Total valid votes		33,156			33,766		
Labour gain from National	Majority	2,539	7.66	+10.51			

Electorate (as at 26 November 2011): 44,556

=== 2008 election ===
2008 general election: West Coast-Tasman
Notes:	Blue background denotes the winner of the electorate vote. Pink background denotes a candidate elected from their party list. Yellow background denotes an electorate win by a list member, or other incumbent. A ✓ or ✗ denotes status of any incumbent, win or lose respectively.						
Party	Candidate	Votes	%	±%	Party votes	%	±%
National	Chris Auchinvole	15,844	46.51	+5.59	15,187	44.07	
Labour	✗ Damien O'Connor	14,873	43.66	−4.03	11,532	33.46	
Green	Kevin Hague	2,102	6.17	+1.38	3,740	10.85	
Legalise Cannabis	Steven Wilkinson	623	1.83	+0.21	206	0.60	
McGillicuddy Serious	Steve Richards	259	0.76				
United Future	Jocelyn Smith	252	0.74	−1.33	398	1.15	
NZ Representative Party	Reg Turner	62	0.18				
Aotearoa NZ Youth Party	Robert Terry	50	0.15				
NZ First					1,313	3.81	
ACT					744	2.16	
Kiwi					349	1.01	
Progressive					292	0.85	
Bill and Ben					243	0.71	
Māori Party					216	0.63	
Family Party					122	0.35	
Democrats					37	0.11	
Alliance					29	0.08	
Libertarianz					20	0.06	
Workers Party					14	0.04	
Pacific					10	0.03	
RAM					5	0.01	
RONZ					3	0.01	
Informal votes		366			223		
Total valid votes		34,065			34,460		
National gain from Labour	Majority	971	2.85				

=== 2005 election ===
2005 general election: West Coast-Tasman
Notes:	Blue background denotes the winner of the electorate vote. Pink background denotes a candidate elected from their party list. Yellow background denotes an electorate win by a list member, or other incumbent. A ✓ or ✗ denotes status of any incumbent, win or lose respectively.						
Party	Candidate	Votes	%	±%	Party votes	%	±%
Labour	✓ Damien O'Connor	15,178	47.69	−6.14	12,012	37.22	
National	Chris Auchinvole	13,024	40.93	+13.05	12,776	39.59	
Green	Richard Davies	1,526	4.80		2,913	9.03	
United Future	Milton Osborne	658	2.07		977	3.03	
Legalise Cannabis	Steve Wilkinson	515	1.62		174	0.54	
Progressive	Lew Holland	358	1.12		558	1.73	
Christian Heritage	Derek Blight	314	0.99		131	0.41	
ACT	Kevin Gill	251	0.79		348	1.08	
NZ First					2,029	6.29	
Māori Party					118	0.37	
Destiny					111	0.34	
Democrats					30	0.09	
Libertarianz					21	0.07	
Alliance					20	0.06	
Family Rights					12	0.04	
One NZ					11	0.03	
99 MP					10	0.03	
Direct Democracy					10	0.03	
RONZ					10	0.03	
Informal votes		354			131		
Total valid votes		31,824			32,271		
Labour hold	Majority	2,154	6.77	−19.18			

=== 1999 election ===
Refer to Candidates in the New Zealand general election 1999 by electorate#West Coast-Tasman for a list of candidates.
