= West Coast (New Zealand electorate) =

West Coast is a former New Zealand Parliamentary electorate, from 1972 to 1996.

== Population centres ==
Since the 1969 election, the number of electorates in the South Island was fixed at 25, with continued faster population growth in the North Island leading to an increase in the number of general electorates. There were 84 electorates for the 1969 election, and the 1972 electoral redistribution saw three additional general seats created for the North Island, bringing the total number of electorates to 87. Together with increased urbanisation in Christchurch and Nelson, the changes proved very disruptive to existing electorates. In the South Island, three electorates were abolished, and three electorates were newly created (including West Coast). In the North Island, five electorates were abolished, two electorates were recreated, and six electorates were newly created. The West Coast and Tasman electorates replaced the former Buller and Westland electorates in 1972.

Population centres of the original West Coast electorate were Haast, Whataroa, Hari Hari, Ross, Hokitika, Kumara, Greymouth, Moana, Punakaiki, Reefton, Inangahua, Westport, and Karamea. In the 1977 electoral redistribution, Springs Junction was gained from the Tasman electorate. There were no boundary changes through the 1983 and 1987 electoral redistribution.

== History ==
Labour's Paddy Blanchfield had represented the Westland electorate since 1960 and when Westland was abolished in 1972, Blanchfield transferred to the West Coast electorate. He retired at the 1978 election and was replaced by Kerry Burke. Burke was defeated in 1990 by Margaret Moir of the National Party. Due to the electorate being home to Blackball, the birthplace of the Labour Party, there was surprise at National's victory in 1990. Labour leader Mike Moore referred to the electorate as "Jerusalem" and was determined to recapture it. Moir was in turn defeated by Damien O'Connor at the 1993 election.

In 1996, the first mixed-member proportional (MMP) election the electorate was combined with Tasman to form the West Coast-Tasman electorate.

=== Members of Parliament ===
Key

Labour National

| Election | Winner |
|---|---|
| 1972 election | Paddy Blanchfield |
| 1975 election | Paddy Blanchfield |
| 1978 election | Kerry Burke |
| 1981 election | Kerry Burke |
| 1984 election | Kerry Burke |
| 1987 election | Kerry Burke |
| 1990 election | Margaret Moir |
| 1993 election | Damien O'Connor |
(Electorate abolished 1996; see West Coast-Tasman)

== Election results ==
=== 1993 election ===
1993 general election: West Coast
| Party | Candidate | Votes | % | ±% |
|---|---|---|---|---|
| Labour | Damien O'Connor | 8,920 | 46.26 | |
| National | Margaret Moir | 6,000 | 31.11 | −18.22 |
| Alliance | Iri Sinclair | 2,525 | 13.09 | |
| Independent | Peter Neame | 852 | 4.41 | −2.84 |
| NZ First | James Kelly | 622 | 3.22 | |
| Christian Heritage | David Robinson | 321 | 1.66 | |
| Natural Law | Claire Taylor | 42 | 0.21 | |
| Majority | | 2,920 | 15.14 | |
| Turnout | | 19,282 | 85.81 | −1.57 |
| Registered electors | | 22,469 | | |

=== 1990 election ===
1990 general election: West Coast
| Party | Candidate | Votes | % | ±% |
|---|---|---|---|---|
| National | Margaret Moir | 9,178 | 49.33 | |
| Labour | Kerry Burke | 6,567 | 35.29 | −4.46 |
| Independent | Peter Neame | 1,349 | 7.25 | −13.28 |
| NewLabour | Jim Kelly | 1,056 | 5.67 | |
| Democrats | Warren Grant | 237 | 1.27 | |
| Social Credit | Al Rennie | 218 | 1.17 | |
| Majority | | 2,611 | 14.03 | |
| Turnout | | 18,605 | 87.38 | −0.40 |
| Registered electors | | 21,292 | | |

=== 1987 election ===
1987 general election: West Coast
| Party | Candidate | Votes | % | ±% |
|---|---|---|---|---|
| Labour | Kerry Burke | 7,486 | 39.75 | −10.94 |
| National | Gordon Garwood | 6,006 | 31.89 | |
| Independent | Peter Neame | 3,866 | 20.53 | |
| Democrats | Rosalie Newcombe | 978 | 5.19 | |
| NZ Party | Alan Blackadder | 312 | 1.65 | |
| Independent | Lee Antunovich | 180 | 0.95 | |
| Majority | | 1,480 | 7.86 | −13.77 |
| Turnout | | 18,828 | 87.78 | −3.24 |
| Registered electors | | 21,447 | | |

=== 1984 election ===
1984 general election: West Coast
| Party | Candidate | Votes | % | ±% |
|---|---|---|---|---|
| Labour | Kerry Burke | 10,062 | 50.69 | +2.05 |
| National | John Bateman | 5,769 | 29.06 | |
| NZ Party | Bill Murphy | 1,976 | 9.95 | |
| Social Credit | Kieran Murcott | 1,788 | 9.00 | |
| Values | Rosalie Steward | 252 | 1.26 | |
| Majority | | 4,293 | 21.63 | +9.24 |
| Turnout | | 19,847 | 91.02 | +0.73 |
| Registered electors | | 21,803 | | |

=== 1981 election ===
1981 general election: West Coast
| Party | Candidate | Votes | % | ±% |
|---|---|---|---|---|
| Labour | Kerry Burke | 9,422 | 48.64 | +1.37 |
| National | Doug Truman | 5,016 | 25.89 | |
| Social Credit | Eamon O'Connor | 4,932 | 25.46 | +9.16 |
| Majority | | 2,401 | 12.39 | −16.73 |
| Turnout | | 19,370 | 90.29 | +8.74 |
| Registered electors | | 21,452 | | |

=== 1978 election ===
1978 general election: West Coast
| Party | Candidate | Votes | % | ±% |
|---|---|---|---|---|
| Labour | Kerry Burke | 9,167 | 47.27 | −1.37 |
| National | George Ferguson | 3,520 | 18.15 | |
| Independent | Don Eadie | 3,334 | 17.19 | |
| Social Credit | Eamon O'Connor | 3,161 | 16.30 | |
| Values | Joanna Plows | 209 | 1.07 | |
| Majority | | 5,647 | 29.12 | |
| Turnout | | 19,391 | 81.55 | −7.38 |
| Registered electors | | 23,778 | | |

=== 1975 election ===
1975 general election: West Coast
| Party | Candidate | Votes | % | ±% |
|---|---|---|---|---|
| Labour | Paddy Blanchfield | 9,522 | 51.39 | −1.64 |
| National | Barry Dallas | 7,121 | 38.43 | +14.13 |
| Social Credit | Henry Pierson | 1,019 | 5.50 | |
| Values | Brian Weston | 698 | 3.76 | |
| Independent Labour | J D Houston | 166 | 0.89 | |
| Majority | | 2,401 | 12.96 | −12.49 |
| Turnout | | 18,526 | 88.93 | −1.92 |
| Registered electors | | 20,832 | | |

=== 1972 election ===
1972 general election: West Coast
| Party | Candidate | Votes | % | ±% |
|---|---|---|---|---|
| Labour | Paddy Blanchfield | 8,291 | 49.75 | |
| Independent | Barry Dallas | 4,049 | 24.30 | |
| National | John Bruerton | 3,583 | 21.50 | |
| Social Credit | H M Woodhall | 707 | 4.24 | |
| New Democratic | C F Woods | 32 | 0.19 | |
| Majority | | 4,242 | 25.45 | |
| Turnout | | 16,662 | 90.85 | |
| Registered electors | | 18,339 | | |
