= Kieran McAnulty =

New Zealand politician

The Honourable Kieran McAnulty MP
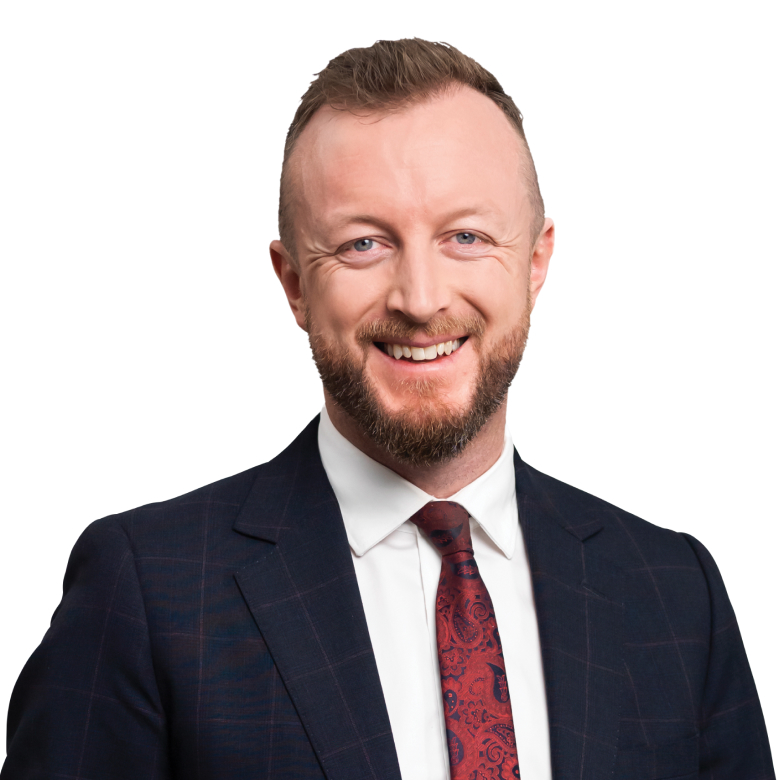
- McAnulty in 2023

20th Minister of Local Government
- In office 1 February 2023 – 27 November 2023
- Prime Minister: Chris Hipkins
- Preceded by: Nanaia Mahuta
- Succeeded by: Simeon Brown

2nd Minister for Rural Communities
- In office 1 February 2023 – 27 November 2023
- Prime Minister: Chris Hipkins
- Preceded by: Damien O'Connor
- Succeeded by: Mark Patterson

28th Minister for Emergency Management
- In office 14 June 2022 – 27 November 2023
- Prime Minister: Jacinda Ardern; Chris Hipkins
- Preceded by: Kiri Allan
- Succeeded by: Mark Mitchell

14th Minister for Racing
- In office 14 June 2022 – 27 November 2023
- Prime Minister: Jacinda Ardern; Chris Hipkins
- Preceded by: Grant Robertson
- Succeeded by: Winston Peters

Chief Government Whip in the House of Representatives
- In office 2 November 2020 – 14 June 2022
- Prime Minister: Jacinda Ardern
- Preceded by: Michael Wood
- Succeeded by: Duncan Webb

Member of the New Zealand Parliament for Wairarapa
- In office 17 October 2020 – 14 October 2023
- Preceded by: Alastair Scott
- Succeeded by: Mike Butterick

Member of the New Zealand Parliament for Labour
- In office 23 September 2017 – 17 October 2020

Personal details
- Born: Eketāhuna, New Zealand
- Party: Labour
- Spouse(s): Suzanne McNally (m. 2011; div. 2018) Gia Garrick (m. 2023)
- Education: University of Otago
- Profession: Politician

Kieran Michael McAnulty is a New Zealand politician. He was first elected to the New Zealand House of Representatives in 2017, representing the New Zealand Labour Party. He was the Member of Parliament (MP) for Wairarapa between 2020 and 2023, and is currently a list MP.

McAnulty was the Senior Whip of the Labour Party during part of the term of the Sixth Labour Government. He later served as that government's Minister of Local Government, Minister for Emergency Management, Minister for Racing and Deputy Leader of the House.

== Early life and family ==
McAnulty was born in Eketāhuna in 1985, and was adopted by Marie (née Monaghan) and Mike McAnulty. Their families have lived in the Wairarapa area for more than 170 years, with his great grandmother's great grandfather, Henry Burling, arriving as an early settler in what is now the town of Featherston. The McAnulty family is a historically "staunch" family of Labour Party supporters, although his mother's family included some National Party supporters. Ted McAnulty, Kieran's great-grandfather, ("the only Labour-voting cockie in Eketāhuna") was the campaign manager for a Labour candidate running against Prime Minister Keith Holyoake in the Pahiatua electorate, at that time a safe National seat. John Monaghan, the former chair of Fonterra, is his mother's cousin.

McAnulty was raised Catholic. He attended St Mary's School in Carterton, St Patrick's School in Masterton, and Chanel College, where he was head boy in 2002. He went on to the University of Otago where he completed a Bachelor of Arts, Postgraduate Diploma in Arts and Master of Arts in politics. His 2011 master's thesis was titled "The role of political positioning in party performance in the 2008 New Zealand General Election." He has previously worked for the T.A.B. as a bookmaker covering the racing industry and an economic development advisor for the Masterton District Council. He has been a volunteer firefighter.

He met his first wife, Suzanne McNally, while travelling in her home country of Ireland on an overseas experience. They married in 2011 and later divorced. McAnulty married his second wife, the former prime minister's press secretary Gia Garrick, in January 2024.

== Member of Parliament ==
New Zealand Parliament
Years	Term	Electorate	List	Party
2017–2020	52nd	List	38	Labour
2020–2023	53rd	Wairarapa	26	Labour
2023–2023	54th	List	16	Labour
2026–present	55th	List	10	Labour

=== 2014 election candidacy ===
McAnulty stood in the North Island electorate of Wairarapa at the 2014 election, but was defeated by National's Alastair Scott. He had previously been offered the Wairarapa candidacy in 2011, but declined.

=== First term, 2017–2020 ===
McAnulty stood for Labour in Wairarapa again in the 2017 election. Although he reduced Scott's majority, he failed to win the electorate. He instead entered Parliament via the party list, where he had been ranked 38.

In November 2017 he was appointed Labour's junior whip. In his first term, he served on the primary production committee. His maiden statement, given on 16 November 2017, focused on the values of fairness and equality.

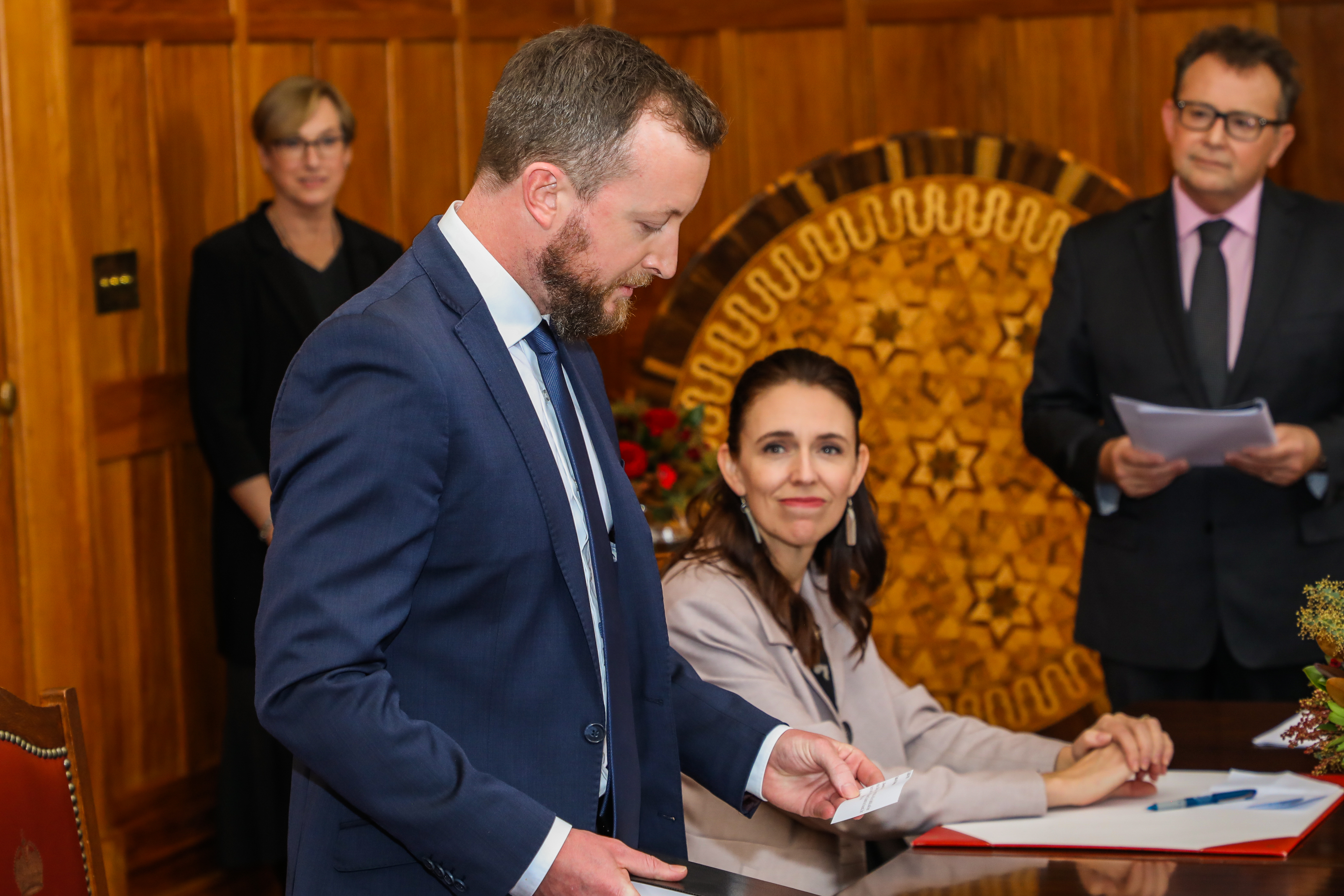
McAnulty reads the oath of allegiance at his appointment to the Executive Council, at Government House, Wellington, on 14 June 2022. Watching on are the prime minister, Jacinda Ardern, and Michael Webster, clerk of the Executive Council.

On 25 September 2019, McAnulty was ejected from Parliament by the Speaker of the House Trevor Mallard for making disparaging remarks about National Party leader Simon Bridges during a Parliamentary debate about Prime Minister Jacinda Ardern's meeting with US President Donald Trump. Mallard also ejected New Zealand First MP Shane Jones for similar disruptive behaviour.

McAnulty became well known for his distinctive, run-down red 1997 Mazda Bounty ute. In his maiden speech, he described how it is missing a back door; later, it was reported "the radio sometimes falls out and the heater doesn’t work" and the ute, which had not been able to drive faster than "110kmh in a decade" and had gone further than 463,000 kilometers. In September 2016, McAnulty wrestled to the ground a car thief who was trying to steal the ute in Masterton. He attracted media attention when he chauffeured Ardern in the ute during the 2020 election campaign and, after the election, when he sold it for charity and replaced it with a 2021 Mitsubishi hybrid electric Outlander.

=== Second term, 2020–2023 ===
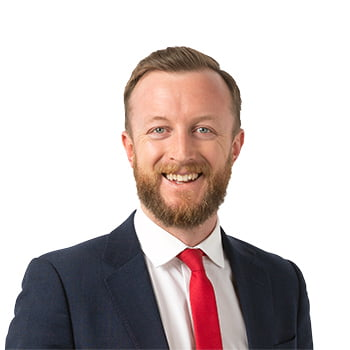
McAnulty in 2020

In the 2020 New Zealand general election, McAnulty contested the Wairarapa electorate for Labour, winning by a margin of 6,545 votes over new candidate Mike Butterick. On 2 November 2020, following the election, the Labour caucus elected McAnulty as its chief whip.

In a June 2022 reshuffle, McAnulty was appointed as Minister for Racing and Minister for Emergency Management, outside Cabinet, as well an associate minister in the local government and transport portfolios. McAnulty joined the executive at a "uniquely challenging time" for local government, according to prime minister Jacinda Ardern, due to tensions and challenges related to the government's reforms in the portfolio on top of localised emergencies. He completed a tour of visits to New Zealand's to 54 rural and provincial councils in his first five months. He led the passage of the Local Electoral (Advertising) Amendment Act 2022 on behalf of the Minister of Local Government, Nanaia Mahuta.

In August 2022, McAnulty was implicated in bullying accusations by fellow Labour MP Gaurav Sharma. Sharma accused McAnulty of "gaslighting me, shouting at me, degrading me in front of caucus members and other attendees at events and telling me that I was a terrible MP". The Labour Party, including Ardern, rejected the claims.

In January 2023, McAnulty claimed he was advised by parliamentary security to stop advertising the availability of his mobile office in his electorate because of death threats against him.

Following a cabinet reshuffle that occurred on 31 January 2023, McAnulty was promoted into Cabinet and succeeded Mahuta as the local government minister. New prime minister Chris Hipkins also confirmed that the Three Waters reform programme (which falls under the Local Government portfolio) would continue. McAnulty continued as Minister for Racing and was also appointed Minister for Rural Communities and Deputy Leader of the House. He picked up the Minister for Regional Development role after Kiri Allan resigned from Cabinet in July 2023.

On 14 February 2023, McAnulty, in his capacity as Minister of Emergency Management, declared a national state of emergency over the Northland, Auckland, Tairawhiti, Bay of Plenty, Waikato and Hawke's Bay regions in response to Cyclone Gabrielle. This marked the third time a state of emergency had been declared over the country.

As Minister of Local Government, McAnulty announced a major overhaul of the Government's Three Waters reform programme, which was renamed the Water Services Reform Programme. The proposed four water services entities were expanded into ten entities but will retain the same split co-governance structure consisting of representatives of local councils and mana whenua representatives. He defended the retention of the Government's water infrastructure programme, stating that simply ditching it would be "dumping our duty." McAnulty also defended the programme's co-governance element, stating that Māori people have a special interest in water that has been established by the Treaty of Waitangi and the court system. He defended accusations that the co-governance element is "anti-democratic" by saying that "in each democratic system, there are specific factors that are unique to each country." Newsroom reported that McAnulty received praise "for 'cutting to the chase' and explaining in simple terms that the reforms are first and foremost about cost savings." He received the report of the Future for Local Government review established by his predecessor, but declined to commit to its recommendations before the 2023 general election.

=== Third term, 2023–2026 ===
During the 2023 New Zealand general election, McAnulty was unseated in Wairarapa by the National Party's Mike Butterick. He returned to Parliament on the Labour Party list. After the election, he was promoted to seventh in the Shadow Cabinet of Chris Hipkins and became the party's spokesperson for housing, regional development and local government.

On 5 December 2023, McAnulty was granted retention of the title The Honourable, in recognition of his term as a member of the Executive Council.

In June 2024, The Post reported that McAnulty was claiming a NZ$36,400 annual housing allowance to rent a Lower Hutt flat from his wife. McAnulty resided at the flat while Parliament is in session. In addition, McAnulty owned a four-bedroom, NZ$655,000 home in Masterton, which is about one hour and 40 minute drive away from Wellington.

During a cabinet reshuffle in early March 2025, McAnulty retained the Shadow Leader and housing portfolios, and gained the infrastructure and public investment portfolios. He also lost the local government and regional development portfolios.

On 19 February 2026, McAnulty was ejected from a House debate after clashing with Speaker of the House Gerry Brownlee over remarks by New Zealand First leader Winston Peters criticising Green Party MP Teanau Tuiono for referring to New Zealand as Aotearoa. McAnulty had accused Brownlee of showing "double standards" towards government and opposition MPs.

On 1 April 2026, McAnulty's private member's bill easing alcohol restrictions on Good Friday, Anzac Day and Christmas Day passed its third reading, becoming law. This bill allows premises open on those days to sell alcohol under normal licence conditions but excludes liquors stores and supermarkets. It passed by a margin of 66 to 55 votes, with Members of Parliament exercising a conscience vote. The bill received royal assent on 2 April.

=== Fourth term, 2026–present ===
During the 2026 New Zealand general election scheduled for 7 November, McAnulty stood in Wairarapa for the Labour Party. He was ranked tenth on the Labour Party list. Based on preliminary results, McAnulty came second in the Wairarapa race, with 17,804 votes. The incumbent National Party MP Mike Butterick retained the electorate by a narrow margin of 139 votes. McAnulty was re-elected to Parliament on the Labour Party list.

== Political views ==
McAnulty identifies as a socialist and supports a New Zealand republic, with a local head of state. McAnulty was previously treasurer of the New Zealand Republic campaign before entering parliament.

McAnulty, despite his Catholic faith, is in favour of legalised same-sex marriage and more open abortion laws. He stated in Parliament when debating the Abortion Legislation Bill: "I was raised that my religious views are mine only. So I will not use my vote today to impose any particular view that I may have to prevent the choice of a woman to make on her own body."

McAnulty is in favour of decriminalising cannabis, and has admitted to smoking cannabis twice. He voted "yes" in both the 2020 New Zealand cannabis referendum and the 2020 New Zealand euthanasia referendum. Regarding the conflict between his Catholic religion and support for euthanasia, he said: "Not everyone believes in God. And as long as we have a structure in place that allows people to pursue their own personal beliefs, then how dare they impose their views on others?"

New Zealand Parliament
Preceded by Alastair Scott	Member of Parliament for Wairarapa; 2020–2023	Succeeded by Mike Butterick
Political offices
Preceded by Kiri Allan	Minister for Emergency Management; 2022–2023	Succeeded by Mark Mitchell
Preceded by Grant Robertson	Minister for Racing; 2022–2023	Succeeded by Winston Peters
Preceded by Nanaia Mahuta	Minister of Local Government; 2023	Succeeded by Simeon Brown
Preceded by Damien O'Connor	Minister for Rural Communities; 2023	Succeeded by Mark Patterson
Party political offices
Preceded by Michael Wood	Senior Whip of the Labour Party; 2020–2022	Succeeded by Duncan Webb
