= Maureen Pugh =

New Zealand politician (born 1958)

Maureen Pugh ONZM MP
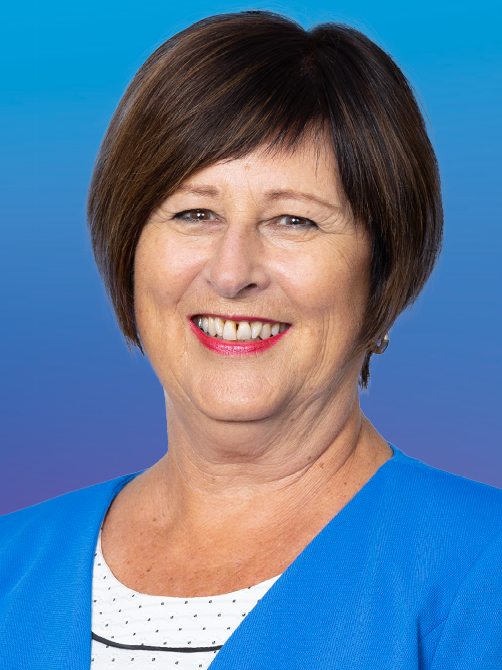
- Pugh in 2023

First Assistant Speaker of the House of Representatives
- Incumbent
- Assumed office 6 December 2023
- Speaker: Gerry Brownlee
- Preceded by: Jenny Salesa

Member of the New Zealand Parliament for West Coast-Tasman
- Incumbent
- Assumed office 14 October 2023
- Preceded by: Damien O'Connor

Member of the New Zealand Parliament for National Party list
- In office 14 March 2018 – 14 October 2023
- Preceded by: Bill English
- In office 9 February 2016 – 23 September 2017
- Preceded by: Tim Groser

Mayor of Westland
- In office 2004–2013
- Preceded by: John Drylie
- Succeeded by: Mike Havill

Personal details
- Born: Maureen Helena Pugh; 1958 (age 67–68) New Zealand
- Party: National Party
- Other political affiliations: Independent (as mayor)
- Education: St Mary's High School

Maureen Helena Pugh ONZM (born 1958) is a New Zealand politician. She was the mayor of Westland from 2004 to 2013. She first became a Member of Parliament for the National Party in 2016, leaving Parliament in 2017 and returning in 2018. She was initially a list MP, before winning the West Coast-Tasman electorate in 2023.

== Political career ==
=== Westland District Council ===
Pugh was elected to the Westland District Council in 1998 and served two terms before being elected as the district's first woman mayor in 2004, succeeding John Drylie. In 2007 she was returned as mayor unopposed. She stood down at the 2013 elections and was succeeded as mayor by Michael Havill.

While serving as mayor of Westland District Council, Pugh was accused of failure to declare a financial conflict of interest.

=== Parliament ===
New Zealand Parliament
Years	Term	Electorate	List	Party
2016–2017	51st	List	52	National
2018–2020	52nd	List	44	National
2020–2023	53rd	List	19	National
2023–present	54th	West Coast-Tasman	26	National

==== First term, 2016–2017 ====
Pugh contested the West Coast-Tasman electorate unsuccessfully for the New Zealand National Party in the 2014 general election. Ranked number 52 on the National Party list, she just missed out on a list seat in the final results. She would have got a list seat on preliminary results, but National's proportion of the party vote reduced in the final results and the Green Party's Steffan Browning won the seat she would have taken. Pugh remained first in line should a vacancy arise in a list seat held by a National Party MP during the 51st New Zealand Parliament, and following Tim Groser's resignation in December 2015 she was sworn in as a member of parliament on 9 February 2016 after the summer recess.

==== Second term, 2018–2020 ====
Pugh contested the West Coast-Tasman electorate unsuccessfully in the 2017 general election. She ranked higher, at 44, in the National Party list, and preliminary results again showed National had won enough seats (58) for her to gain one. However, the official count gave National two fewer seats than the preliminary count, and she did not return to parliament. Due to her history of appearing in and then out of parliament due to special votes, Pugh describes herself as the 'Yo-yo MP'. Pugh was again in line to enter parliament if there were resignations, and she and several other "next-in-line" list candidates attended National's parliamentary caucus retreat in February 2018 to help ease their transition into the caucus should they enter parliament. In March 2018, Bill English resigned from parliament and Pugh was declared elected as a list MP.

Simon Bridges, who was National Party leader from 2018 to 2020, described Pugh as "fucking useless" in a phone call with Jami-Lee Ross, which was recorded and posted on Facebook by Ross in October 2018. Bridges apologised to her after the recording became public. She voted with the majority against Bridges in the May 2020 leadership election.

==== Third term, 2020–2023 ====
Pugh contested the West Coast-Tasman electorate unsuccessfully in the 2020 general election. This time, at 19 on the party list, both preliminary and final results gave her a list seat. She had been anticipating missing out again after the counting of special votes for the final results and had already started packing her Wellington apartment, which she would have to send back. The National caucus elected her as its Junior Whip on 10 November.

In February 2022 Pugh expressed support through Facebook for Convoy 2022, a protest group who travelled to Wellington to occupy the grounds of parliament, protesting vaccine mandates, with some opposing the vaccine itself. Pugh later amended the post, then deleted it, and said she did not realise many of the protesters were against COVID-19 vaccination. After the occupation of parliament grounds was over, Pugh said that "we [the National Party] had one or two members [party members, not members of parliament] in there talking with protestors on an almost daily basis... we wrote to the only email address we had and said we would enter dialogue as soon as they stopped the unlawful aspects to their protest." A National Party spokesperson said that "National did not send anyone—MPs, members or otherwise—to enter in discussions with protestors. However we are aware of party members who attended the protest of their own accord".

==== Fourth term, 2023–present ====
Final results from the 2023 general election indicate that Pugh had won the electorate of West Coast-Tasman, beating the incumbent Damien O'Connor by a margin of 1,017 votes.

On 6 December 2023, she was appointed Assistant Speaker of the House of Representatives.

On 11 June 2024, Pugh was confronted by a group of protesters who were opposed to the National-led coalition government's proposed Fast-track Approvals Bill in the Golden Bay town of Tākaka. Pugh was meeting with members of the Tākaka Community Board to foster relations with the local government body. During the incident, Pugh was allegedly assaulted by a male protester who pushed his poster against her face.

On 23 January 2026, Pugh confirmed that she would retire from Parliament at the 2026 general election.

In May 2026, Pugh was part of a cross-party delegation of four New Zealand MPs including David Wilson, Laura McClure and Duncan Webb who visited Taiwan, meeting with Taiwanese legislators and foreign ministry officials. In response, the Chinese government in early June 2026 banned the four from visiting China, Hong Kong and Macau for a year on the grounds that their actions violated the One China policy. The Chinese Embassy in New Zealand stated that their travel ban could be waived if they apologised for their actions. Prime Minister Christopher Luxon denounced the ban on the four MPs as "entirely inappropriate" and said that the New Zealand government would raise the matter with their Chinese counterparts.

In September 2026, Pugh as Assistant Speaker ordered both Te Pāti Māori co-leader Debbie Ngarewa-Packer and Labour Party MP Willie Jackson to leave the House of Representative's debating chamber following an argument. Ngarewa-Packer had used the swear word "cunt" during a parliamentary debate on the National-led government's contentious move-on orders while Jackson had contested Pugh's decision to discipline Ngarewa-Packer. After Jackson continued to speak, Pugh ordered the Sergeant-at-arms to escort him out of the debating chamber.

== Views and positions ==
Pugh revealed in 2016 that she does not believe in pharmaceutical drugs, saying that she never takes any kind of medication and has only ever given her children chiropractic treatments. She said that nature delivers whatever people need, and that "there's nothing wrong with getting a cold or getting a flu – if you have a healthy immune system you can deal with it." The following day she wrote "I do support the use of pharmaceuticals, such as Panadol and anaesthetic". Pugh was one of the last Members of Parliament to receive a COVID-19 vaccination.

On cannabis, Pugh said that she did not support its decriminalisation, having seen its negative effects on some people, but she was not opposed to people "smoking or digesting a natural plant", adding, "I'm just talking about giving the poor lady whose got lymphoma a plant to smoke, which she can grow in her backyard."

On climate change, Pugh stated in 2023 that, while she believed in it, she had yet to see evidence of anthropocentric causes of that change. Her party leader Christopher Luxon responded to Pugh's refusal to say she believes in man-made climate change by stating "If you're a climate denier... that's not an acceptable position". Pugh later reversed her position, saying that she accepted that human-induced climate change was real and that it was a factor in extreme weather such as Cyclone Gabrielle. Radio New Zealand journalist Guyon Espiner likened the retraction to a "hostage video". Regarding electricity generation, Pugh also said in 2023 that she wanted to explore more renewable energy projects in the region. She noted that the West Coast pays about 25 percent more for its electricity than other regions, and considered that local electricity generation could help to bring prices down and so attract more businesses.

Pugh said in 2023 that recent minimum pay increases had encouraged some employers to consider automation and that the consequences of those rises hadn't been thought through. She also said she was unhappy about recent changes to the Recognised Seasonal Employer scheme.

== Personal life ==
Pugh was educated at St Mary's High School, Greymouth. Pugh and her husband John lived on their farm in a mountain valley at Turiwhate, near Kumara until John's death in 2024. According to Pugh, her house's former copper piping acted as a conductor for electrical storms, and Pugh has been struck by lightning three times.

In the 2014 New Year Honours, Pugh was appointed an Officer of the New Zealand Order of Merit for services to local government.
