= Damien O'Connor =

New Zealand politician

The Honourable Damien O'Connor MP
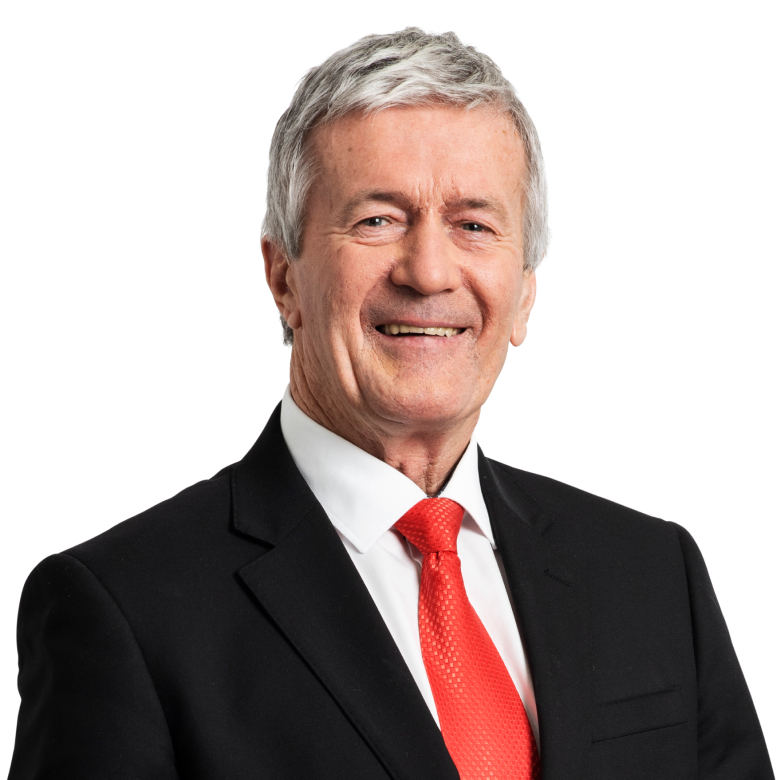
- O'Connor in 2023

34th Minister of Agriculture
- In office 26 October 2017 – 27 November 2023
- Prime Minister: Jacinda Ardern; Chris Hipkins
- Preceded by: Vacant (last held by David Carter)
- Succeeded by: Todd McClay

Minister for Biosecurity
- In office 26 October 2017 – 27 November 2023
- Prime Minister: Jacinda Ardern; Chris Hipkins
- Preceded by: Vacant (last held by David Carter)
- Succeeded by: Andrew Hoggard

13th Minister for Trade and Export Growth
- In office 6 November 2020 – 27 November 2023
- Prime Minister: Jacinda Ardern; Chris Hipkins
- Preceded by: David Parker
- Succeeded by: Todd McClay

17th Minister for Land Information
- In office 6 November 2020 – 27 November 2023
- Prime Minister: Jacinda Ardern; Chris Hipkins
- Preceded by: Eugenie Sage
- Succeeded by: Chris Penk

1st Minister for Rural Communities
- In office 26 October 2017 – 1 February 2023
- Prime Minister: Jacinda Ardern; Chris Hipkins
- Preceded by: Office Created
- Succeeded by: Kieran McAnulty

Minister for Food Safety
- In office 26 October 2017 – 6 November 2020
- Prime Minister: Jacinda Ardern
- Preceded by: David Bennett
- Succeeded by: Ayesha Verrall

33rd Minister of Tourism
- In office 19 October 2005 – 19 November 2008
- Prime Minister: Helen Clark
- Succeeded by: John Key

Member of the New Zealand Parliament for West Coast-Tasman
- In office 26 November 2011 – 14 October 2023
- Preceded by: Chris Auchinvole
- Succeeded by: Maureen Pugh
- In office 12 October 1996 – 8 November 2008
- Preceded by: Seat established
- Succeeded by: Chris Auchinvole

Member of the New Zealand Parliament for Labour Party list
- Incumbent
- Assumed office 14 October 2023
- In office 1 May 2009 – 26 November 2011
- Preceded by: Michael Cullen (Note: Normally, list MPs do not have individual predecessors or successors, but Cullen resigned during a sitting parliament and therefore was succeeded by O'Connor.)

Member of the New Zealand Parliament for West Coast
- In office 6 November 1993 – 12 October 1996
- Preceded by: Margaret Moir
- Succeeded by: Seat abolished

Personal details
- Born: Damien Peter O'Connor; 16 January 1958 (age 68) Westport, New Zealand
- Party: Labour
- Relations: Greg O'Connor (cousin)
- Education: Lincoln University

Damien Peter O'Connor (born 16 January 1958) is a New Zealand Labour Party politician who served as Minister of Agriculture, Minister for Biosecurity, Minister for Trade and Export Growth, Minister for Land Information and Minister for Rural Communities in the Sixth Labour Government. He previously served as a cabinet minister in the Fifth Labour Government. He had been a member of Parliament since 1993 and represented the West Coast-Tasman electorate. As of 2023 he is on the Labour list.

== Early years ==
O'Connor was born in Westport in 1958. He attended primary school in his home town before going on to St Bede's College, Christchurch, a Roman Catholic school, and Lincoln University.

Before becoming an MP, he worked in a variety of jobs in farming and tourism. During a five-year stint in Australia, he worked as a machinery operator and in sales. On his return to New Zealand he established Buller Adventure Tours, an adventure tourism company, which he owned and operated in a partnership.

== Member of Parliament ==
New Zealand Parliament
Years	Term	Electorate	List	Party
1993–1996	44th	West Coast		Labour
1996–1999	45th	West Coast-Tasman	32	Labour
1999–2002	46th	West Coast-Tasman	none	Labour
2002–2005	47th	West Coast-Tasman	none	Labour
2005–2008	48th	West Coast-Tasman	none	Labour
2009–2011	49th	List	37	Labour
2011–2014	50th	West Coast-Tasman	none	Labour
2014–2017	51st	West Coast-Tasman	22	Labour
2017–2020	52nd	West Coast-Tasman	18	Labour
2020–2023	53rd	West Coast-Tasman	14	Labour
2023–2026	54th	List	10	Labour
2026–present	55th	List	16	Labour

=== Fourth National Government, 1993–1999 ===
He was first elected to Parliament in the 1993 election, recapturing the West Coast seat for Labour after the upset victory of National's Margaret Moir in the 1990 election.

When Helen Clark successfully challenged Mike Moore for the party leadership after the election, O'Connor supported Moore. Later, he said in 2018 that this had set his career back. Unlike other MPs who entered Parliament in 1993, O'Connor was not named a minister in Clark's first ministry in 1999. He was, however, appointed as chair of the Primary Production select committee.

He won the reconfigured West Coast-Tasman seat in the 1996 election, and was the MP for the electorate until he lost it to National's Chris Auchinvole during the 2008 election.

=== Fifth Labour Government, 1999–2008 ===
After the 2002 election he was appointed an associate minister in four portfolios: agriculture, health, racing and rural affairs. He succeeded Annette King as Minister for Racing in a 2003 reshuffle.

After the 2005 election, in what would become the final term of the Fifth Labour Government, O'Connor was promoted to be Minister of Corrections and Minister of Tourism. He lost the Corrections role in 2007, following calls for his resignation over the previous year over the murder of Liam Ashley in a prison van and a scandal where he was found to have brought a suspended prison officer on a parliamentary rugby tour.

=== Fifth National Government, 2008–2017 ===
At the 2008 general election, the Labour government was defeated by the National Party and O'Connor lost the West-Coast Tasman electorate to National Party list MP Chris Auchinvole by 971 votes. At this election O'Connor also stood as a list candidate for the first time since 1996; however, his position of 37 was too low for him to return to Parliament as a Labour Party list MP immediately. O'Connor eventually returned to Parliament after the retirement of former deputy leader Michael Cullen in May 2009. He retook West-Coast Tasman for Labour in 2011 and held the seat until 2023, defending challenges from former Westland District Mayor Maureen Pugh in 2014, 2017, and 2020 before being defeated by Pugh in the 2023 election.

In Opposition between 2009 and 2017, O'Connor held various spokesperson roles including agriculture, biosecurity, fisheries, food safety, primary industries and rural affairs.

=== Sixth Labour Government, 2017–2023 ===
When the Labour Party formed a coalition government with New Zealand First and the Greens in 2017, O'Connor was appointed Minister of Agriculture, Minister for Biosecurity, Minister for Food Safety, Minister for Rural Communities and Associate Minister (later Minister of State) for Trade and Export Growth. An early challenge for O'Connor in the Agriculture portfolio was managing the 2017 Mycoplasma bovis outbreak, opting to attempt eradication to save the projected $1.3 billion cost in lost production to the industry over 10 years, with ongoing productivity losses across the farming sector. On Agriculture, O'Connor has said there is a new “collective wisdom through generational change in farming, which means we are more closely aligned than some on the fringes wish to portray’’.

During the 2020 general election, O'Connor was re-elected in West Coast-Tasman by a final margin of 6,208 votes, defeating National's candidate Maureen Pugh. In early November 2020, O'Connor maintained his Agriculture, Biosecurity, and Rural Communities ministerial portfolios while becoming the lead Minister for Trade and Export Growth and assuming the Land Information ministerial portfolio.

In late January 2021, O'Connor drew media attention when he stated during an interview with CNBC's Asia Squawk Box "Australia "should follow us [New Zealand] and show respect to China." His comments came at a time of heightened Australian-China tensions relating to Australian legislation targeting foreign investment and Chinese trade sanctions against Australia. O'Connor's remarks were criticised as unhelpful to Australia and "at odds with reality" by Liberal MP Dave Sharma. While the Chinese state-owned newspaper Global Times praised Wellington's perceived openness towards Beijing, O'Connor's remarks were criticised by Victoria University of Wellington academic Robert Ayson, International Service for Human Rights director Phil Lynch and Human Rights Watch director Elaine Person for implying that New Zealand was prioritising trade with China over human rights. Following the Russian invasion of Ukraine, O'Connor has since said it is important New Zealand does not send ministers to the 2022 Beijing Winter Olympic Games, stating "we've been very strong on those issues around human rights and unnecessary discrimination. We should continue to do that."

O'Connor has led various trade negotiations across the world in his role as Minister for Trade and Export Growth, including an historic $1.8 Billion EU Free Trade Agreement in 2022. O'Connor was the Facilitator of the Fishing Subsidy negotiations at the 12th World Trade Organisation Conference and delivered an agreement with new rules barring countries from subsidising illegal, unreported, and unregulated fishing.

At the 2022 Asia-Pacific Economic Co-operation (APEC) forum ministers’ meeting, O'Connor joined a staged walkout when the Russian Minister spoke, with the shared statement including “We condemn in the strongest terms, the unprovoked war of aggression by Russia against Ukraine."

In early July 2023, O'Connor accompanied Prime Minister Chris Hipkins to Brussels for the signing of the New Zealand-European free trade agreement. He described the agreement as a "bloody good deal" that had involved several years of tough negotiations. The European Parliament subsequently ratified the NZ-EU free trade agreement on 23 November 2023.

During the 2023 New Zealand general election, O'Connor was unseated by National MP Maureen Pugh, who won the West Coast-Tasman by a margin of 1,017 votes. Despite losing his seat, O'Connor was re-elected to Parliament on the Labour Party list.

In mid November 2023, O'Connor represented New Zealand at the 2023 APEC summit since incoming Prime Minister Christopher Luxon was unable to attend due to ongoing coalition-forming negotiations with the ACT and New Zealand First parties.

=== Sixth National Government, 2023–present ===
Following the formation of the National-led coalition government in late November 2023, O'Connor became spokesperson for trade and associate spokesperson for foreign affairs and transport in the Shadow Cabinet of Chris Hipkins.

In late June 2024, O'Connor received a 60,000-strong petition at Parliament demanding that the National-led government not proceed with plans to reverse the previous Labour government's ban on live-animal exports.

In early March 2025, O'Connor gained the regional development portfolio and retained the trade and land information portfolios during a cabinet reshuffle. He lost the associate foreign affairs and associate trade portfolios.

On January 26, 2026, O'Connor confirmed that he would not be contesting the West Coast-Tasman electorate in the 2026 New Zealand general election. O'Connor would instead seek candidacy for the Waitaki electorate.

In mid March 2026, O'Connor gained the defence portfolio during a cabinet reshuffle.

During the 2026 general election, O'Connor contested the Waitaki electorate for Labour. He was ranked 16th on the Labour Party list. Based on preliminary results, O'Connor came second place in Waitaki, with 11,438 votes. He was elected to Parliament on the Labour Party list.

== Political views ==
O'Connor is regarded as an "economic dry" on the right wing of the Labour Party and is socially conservative on conscience issues. He describes his approach to life and politics in New Zealand as "upfront and honest".

In April 2011 O'Connor attracted criticism from Labour Party leader Phil Goff after describing the list MP selection process as being run by "self-serving unionists and a gaggle of gays." O'Connor was disappointed the system did not deliver better results for rural and provincial candidates, such as himself, who were outside the party's power blocs, and apologised for his comments. He is a staunch advocate for the rural and provincial people with strong family ties to the Labour Party's establishment.

He has stated that the “timing and decisions’’ on some of Parliament’s conscience votes may have portrayed him as something else, but that’s “a long way from the truth’’. In 2012, he was one of four Labour MPs who voted against the Marriage Amendment Bill, which permitted same sex marriage in New Zealand. He has since attended the Pride Parade in London with his daughter who, in 2012, publicly challenged him on his vote stating "Why should they be denied the same human right everyone else is entitled to just because they love someone the same sex?"

In 2014, O'Connor voted with the governing National Party (and against the Labour Party) to support the West Coast Windblown Timber Bill, which allowed the Government to recover storm-blow timber on the West Coast following Cyclone Ita.

O'Connor does not oppose euthanasia, but has voted cautiously on the matter to ensure legislation is strong enough to protect society's most vulnerable. He voted against Michael Laws' Death with Dignity Bill in 1995, Peter Brown's Death with Dignity Bill in 2003 and David Seymour's End of Life Choice Bill in 2019. He also opposed the Abortion Legislation Bill in 2020, but voted in favour in its first reading. He has since stated he "absolutely do[es] support New Zealand's laws on abortion" and, relating to the overturning of Roe v Wade in the United States, said "what we see coming from the US is clearly disturbing and shocking". O'Connor has stated he believes in a woman's right to choose without judgement, but believed the bill required a "technical protection" for the premises of gender or disability.

In December 2023, O'Connor described Israel's actions in Gaza during the Gaza war as amounting to genocide. He stated "that no person with any ounce of moral courage can see this as anything but horrific, nothing more than a genocide." In response, Labour leader Chris Hipkins and fellow Labour MP Phil Twyford clarified that O'Connor's remarks did not represent the Labour Party's position on the conflict. In September 2024, O'Connor reposted a video on social media where Lawrence Wilkerson stated that "Palestinians [had] every right to do what they did on October 7". He later deleted the post, however, did not apologise.

== Business activities ==
O'Connor is past president of the Buller Promotion Association, a member of the West Coast Tourism Development Group, a member of the West Coast Business Development Board and a founding director of Buller Community Development Company. He also won West Coast Young Farmer of the Year.

== Personal life ==
O'Connor separated from his wife Vicky after twelve years of marriage in 2004. The couple had four children. He has a daughter with his new partner, Sharon Flood. Labour Party MP for Ōhāriu and former Police Association president Greg O'Connor is his cousin.

== Notes ==
New Zealand Parliament
Preceded by Margaret Moir	Member of Parliament for West Coast; 1993–1996	Constituency abolished
New constituency	Member of Parliament for West Coast-Tasman; 1996–2008; 2011–2023	Succeeded by Chris Auchinvole
Preceded by Chris Auchinvole	Member of Parliament for West Coast-Tasman; 1996–2008; 2011–2023	Succeeded by Maureen Pugh
Political offices
Preceded by Mark Gosche	Minister for Racing; 2003–2005	Succeeded by Winston Peters
Preceded by Jim Sutton	Minister for Rural Affairs; 2004–2008	Ministerial post abolished
Preceded by Paul Swain	Minister of Corrections; 2005–2007	Succeeded by Phil Goff
Preceded by Mark Burton	Minister of Tourism; 2005–2008	Succeeded by John Key
Preceded by David Bennett	Minister for Food Safety; 2017–2020	Succeeded by Ayesha Verrall
In abeyance Title last held by David Carter	Minister of Agriculture; 2017–2023	Succeeded by Todd McClay
In abeyance Title last held by David Carter	Minister for Biosecurity; 2017–2023	Succeeded by Andrew Hoggard
New ministerial post	Minister for Rural Communities; 2017–2023	Succeeded by Kieran McAnulty
Preceded by David Parker	Minister for Trade and Export Growth; 2020–2023	Succeeded by Todd McClay
Preceded by Eugenie Sage	Minister for Land Information; 2020–2023	Succeeded by Chris Penk
