= Ministry for the Environment (New Zealand) =

Government ministry of New Zealand

- Manatū Mō Te Taiao (Māori)

Agency overview
- Formed: 1986
- Dissolved: 2026
- Superseding agency: Ministry for Cities, Environment, Regions and Transport (MCERT)
- Jurisdiction: New Zealand
- Headquarters: 8 Willis St, Wellington 6011
- Annual budget: Vote Environment; Total budget for 2024/25 ▼$245,237,000

The Ministry for the Environment (MfE; Māori: Manatū Mō Te Taiao) was the public service department of New Zealand charged with advising the New Zealand Government on policies and issues affecting the environment and resource management. It was established under the Environment Act 1986 and disestablished in 2026, with its statutory functions being transferred to the new Ministry for Cities, Environment, Regions and Transport (MCERT).

== Functions and responsibilities ==
=== Legal mandate ===
Functions assigned by Section 31 of the Environment Act 1986 include advising the Minister for the Environment on all aspects of environmental administration, obtaining and disseminating information, and generally providing advice on environmental matters. Since 1988, the Ministry of the Environment has coordinated New Zealand's interdepartmental policy response to climate change.

=== Programs and initiatives ===
The Ministry of the Environment had many key initiatives to support New Zealand and its environment. It administered a number of environmental funds:

- Waste Minimisation Fund
- Environmental Legal Assistance Fund
- Contaminated Sites Remediation Fund

It ran the Green Ribbon Awards, which have been given out by the Minister for the Environment since 1990.

The Ministry owns the Environmental Choice New Zealand ecolabel, but it is administered independently by the New Zealand Ecolabelling Trust.

=== Resource management system ===
In response to the Ministry's establishment, the Resource Management Act 1991 was passed by the New Zealand Parliament to provide the legal framework for resource management and environmental protection. The resource management system governs how people interact with natural resources. It allows people to use natural resources where suitable.

The Act was repealed and replaced by the Sixth Labour Government in 2023 (see: Natural and Built Environment Act 2023 and Spatial Planning Act 2023) before being reinstated that same year after the Sixth National Government came to power. Between 2024 and 2026, the National-led government worked on two replacement laws and in the interim has introduced a permanent fast-track approvals process for some types of development. On 22 September 2026, the National-led government's Planning Act 2026 and Natural Environment Act 2026 passed their third readings, becoming law.

=== Emissions reductions ===
New Zealand aims to reduce all greenhouse gases (except methane emissions from waste and agricultural biological processes) to zero by 2050.

The Ministry prepared the Government's emissions reduction plan (ERP) that outlines how New Zealand will reduce these emissions. These plans are created every 5 years. The ERP requires climate action from many parts of government and sectors of the economy including, transport, energy, building and construction, waste, agriculture and forestry.

=== National adaption plan ===
The Ministry developed a national adaption plan that helps New Zealanders adapt, live and thrive in a more damaged and difficult climate. This plan helps to support different groups of people including Māori and Pacific people. Focus areas of the plan include flood risk areas and developing projects to support other climate change impacts.

=== Recovering from recent severe weather events ===
New Zealand suffers from severe weather events caused by climate change. In 2023, Cyclone Gabrielle severely impacted the Hawke's Bay region. The Ministry supported affected councils and communities to recover and become more resilient.

=== Ban on more problematic plastics ===
The Ministry was responsible for implementing a ban on single-use plastics like straws and produce bags. These products were banned in 2023 as an initial step in the 3-step phase-out plan. Plans to ban all PVC and polystyrene food and beverage packaging were cancelled in 2025.

== History ==
=== Origins ===
The Ministry for the Environment was established under the Environment Act 1986 passed by the Fourth Labour Government which was implemented to encourage preventive measures for the protection of the environment. The Ministry's establishment was intended to ensure broad thinking about environmental issues. Along with the Parliamentary Commissioner for the Environment also established under the Environment Act, the Ministry was a replacement to the Commission for the Environment which had been established in 1972 and took on the Commission's role of advising on environmental policy. The creation of the Department of Conservation for the management of public conservation land followed 9 months later.

In 1997 the Ministry released New Zealand's first State of the Environment report. This was followed up in 2008 by a second report titled Environment New Zealand 2007. Chapter 13 of this report was removed before final publication but was leaked to the Green Party. After news media reported the existence of the omitted chapter, the Ministry placed the contents on its website.

The Environmental Protection Authority was set up in 2011 to carry out some of the environmental regulatory functions of the Ministry as well as other government departments.

=== Policy and implementation ===
The Ministry for the Environment was responsible for implementing Government policy to address climate change and protect New Zealand's natural environment. The Zero Carbon Act, passed in 2019, sets a framework for reducing greenhouse gas emissions and achieving net-zero carbon emissions by 2050. The Act established the Climate Change Commission, which is a crown entity that provides independent advice to the government on emissions reduction targets and strategies. The Commission has been criticised by Greenpeace for not going far enough when making recommendations for agricultural methane reduction.

In July 2025, an independent reference group established by the Ministry released several recommendations for the Government's climate mitigation policies. These proposed policies included halting buy-outs for homes damaged by floods and other weather-related events over a 20-year transition period and adopting a "beneficiary pay" model towards adaptation measures such as flood schemes, sea walls and blue-green infrastructure. Victoria University of Wellington emeritus professor Jonathan Boston described the proposed phasing out of the Government's "buy out" policy for weather-damaged homes as "morally bankrupt."

=== Relationship with Māori ===
The Ministry for the Environment recognised the importance of Māori consultation and collaboration in the work that they do with the tangata of Aotearoa. It recognised two key missions in its work which can be categorised as the consultation with Matauranga Māori, and work towards fulfilling obligations under Te Tiriti o Waitangi.

Matauranga Māori is defined as "the unique Māori way of viewing the world". This and western science are seen as complementary knowledge systems, like strands in a braided river. An example of an initiative targeting this is the National Policy Statement for Indigenous Biodiversity, guided by Hutia te Rito, which highlights the deep connection between people and nature, in turn emphasising the health of people, biodiversity, species, and ecosystems. Another example is the National Policy Statement for Freshwater Management 2020 reflects Te Mana o te Wai—the holistic well-being of water—placing water's health at the centre of decision-making. It promotes collaboration with tangata whenua and recognises connections from mountains to sea. Mātauranga Māori and its integration supports environmental reporting, legislation, and policy.

The Ministry for the Environment played a key role in addressing Treaty of Waitangi issues related to te taiao (the environment). It led or co-led major Waitangi Tribunal inquiries, including Wai 2358 (freshwater and geothermal resources) and Wai 3325 (climate change). The Ministry was committed to working collaboratively with iwi and hapū to develop policy responses to environmental concerns raised in these inquiries.

=== Dissolution ===
In mid-February 2026, the RMA Reform Minister Chris Bishop and the Environment Minister Penny Simmonds confirmed the Sixth National Government would introduce legislation to dissolve the Ministry for the Environment as part of the Government's plans to merge the ministry's functions into the new Ministry for Cities, Environment, Regions and Transport. Bishop said that the merger was needed to address a "fragmented and uncoordinated" bureaucracy. The Government's merger plans were criticised by University of Canterbury political scientist Bronwyn Hayward, who expressed concern that the merger could lead to the loss of "the threads of accountability, the skill, and cohesive delivery of effective policy." The Labour Party's environment spokesperson Rachel Brooking and the Green Party's environment spokesperson Lan Pham accused the Government of de-prioritising the environment.

On 27 May 2026, the New Zealand Parliament passed legislation disestablishing the Ministry and transferring its statutory functions to MCERT. As part of the transfer, functions which had previously been vested in the Ministry were reassigned to the statutory role of Secretary for the Environment. While the National Party and its ACT and New Zealand First coalition partners voted in favour of dissolution, opposition parties opposed the bill. The Greens' environmental spokesperson Lan Pham condemned the decision, stating:

"At a time when all our environmental outcomes across freshwater, air, biodiversity and oceans are going backwards, climate change is flooding communities week after week, costing billions of dollars, lives, and livelihoods, this Government's response is to dismantle the ministry responsible for environmental protection."

On 1 July, MCERT formally came into existence, assuming the functions and responsibilities of the former Ministry for the Environment.

== Ministers ==
Political officeholders connected to the Ministry for the Environment included the Minister for the Environment, the Minister for Climate Change, and the Minister for RMA Reform.

== See also ==
- Climate change in New Zealand
- Environment Court of New Zealand
- Govt^{3}, a discontinued sustainability programme
- List of environmental laws by country: New Zealand
- Resource Management Act 1991, a major statute for environmental protection
- Office of the Chief Freshwater Commissioner
