= Spatial Planning Act 2023 =

Repealed Act of Parliament in New Zealand

New Zealand Parliament
- Royal assent: 23 August 2023

Legislative history
- Introduced by: David Parker
- First reading: 22 November 2022
- Second reading: 18 July 2023
- Third reading: 15 August 2023

Related legislation
- Resource Management Act 1991, Natural and Built Environment Act 2023
- Status: Repealed

The Spatial Planning Act 2023 (SPA), now repealed, was one of three laws introduced by the Sixth Labour Government in order to replace New Zealand's Resource Management Act 1991 (RMA). Its purpose was to provide for regional spatial strategies that assisted the purpose of the Natural and Built Environment Act 2023 (NBA) and promote integration in the performance of functions under the NBA, the Land Transport Management Act 2003, the Local Government Act 2002, and the Water Services Entities Act 2022.

The Bill passed its third reading on 15 August 2023, and received royal assent on 23 August 2023. On 23 December 2023, the SPA and NBA were both repealed by the National-led coalition government.

== Key provisions ==
The Spatial Planning Act 2023 requires all regions to have a regional spatial strategy that must align with the geographical boundaries of the region. The Chatham Islands' regional planning committee and offshore islands administered by the Minister of Conservation were excluded from this requirement.

The Spatial Planning Act also outlined the scope, contents, preparation and implementation of the regional spatial strategies including matters of national and regional importance. The Act also entrenched Te Ture Whaimana as the primary direction-setting document for the Waikato and Waipā Rivers, along with activities within their catchments affecting the rivers.

The Spatial Planning Act also required regional spatial strategies to take into account customary marine title areas and identified Māori land. Regional planning committees were also required to comply with Māori consultation arrangements. The Act also outlined the process for consulting with Māori groups.

The Act also contained provisions for cross-regional planning committees to develop plans affecting two or more regions. The Act also outlined the responsibilities and process for the Minister responsible for managing the RMA process.

The Spatial Planning Act also amended several existing laws including the Conservation Act 1987, Environment Act 1986, the Land Transport Management Act 2003, the Local Government Act 2002 and the Water Services Entities Act 2022.

== Legislative history ==
=== Introduction ===
In 2020, a review of the Resource Management Act 1991 (RMA) identified various problems with the existing resource management system, and concluded that it could not cope with modern environmental pressures. In January 2021, the Sixth Labour Government announced that the RMA will be replaced by three acts: the core Natural and Built Environment Act, focusing land use and environmental regulation; the Strategic Planning Act, focusing on development laws; and the Climate Change Adaptation Act, focusing on managed retreat and climate change funding.

On 14 November 2022, the Labour Government introduced the Spatial Planning Act into the New Zealand House of Representatives alongside the companion Natural and Built Environment Act (NBA) as part of its RMA reform efforts. The opposition National and ACT parties opposed the two replacement bills, claiming that they created more centralisation, bureaucracy and did little to address the problems with the RMA process. The Green Party expressed concerns about the perceived lack of environment protection in the proposed legislation.

=== First reading ===
On 22 November 2022, Environment Minister David Parker introduced the Strategic Planning Act during its first reading. Several Labour and Green MPs including Parker, Rachel Brooking, Tāmati Coffey, Eugenie Sage, Anahila Kanongata'a-Suisuiki, Duncan Webb, Lemauga Lydia Sosene and Angie Warren-Clark argued that the SPA would help simplify the resource consent process for housing, infrastructural development, and spatial planning. By contrast, National and ACT MPs including Scott Simpson, Stuart Smith, Simon Court, Sam Uffindell, and David Bennett expressed concerns about red tape and centralisation, and claimed that the bill would do little to address the housing shortage. The SPA passed its first reading by a margin of 74 (Labour and the Greens) to 45 votes (National, ACT, and Te Pāti Māori), and was referred to the Environment select committee.

=== Select committee stage ===
On 27 June 2023, the Environment Committee voted by a majority to progress the SPA to its second reading. These amendments included promoting integration in the functions of the regional spatial strategies (RSS) with the NBA, upholding te Oranga o te Taiao, promoting integration between the RSS and proposed water services entities, clarifying the role of Māori iwi (tribes) and hapū (sub-groups) in the bill, and clarifying the wording around the regional spatial planning process and the transitional process from the RMA framework. The ACT and National parties also published their minority reports. ACT claimed that the SPA would frustrate development by creating more red tape and duplication. National's minority report claimed that the SPA created legal uncertainty, increased bureaucracy, complicated decarbonisation efforts, and undermined property rights.

=== Second reading ===
During its second reading on 18 July 2023, Parliament voted by a margin of 71 (Labour, Greens) to 48 (National, ACT, Te Paati Māori, independent Members of Parliament Elizabeth Kerekere and Meka Whaitiri) to endorse the Environment Committee's amendments. The SPA passed its second reading by a margin of 72 (Labour, Greens, Kerekere) to 47 (National, ACT, Te Paati Māori, and Whaitiri). Labour MPs Parker, Brooking, Phil Twyford, Warren-Clark, Arena Williams, Tracey McLellan, and Sosene, and Green MP Sage gave speeches defending the Bill. National MPs Chris Bishop, Simpson, Barbara Kuriger, and Tama Potaka, and ACT MP Court spoke against the Bill.

=== Third reading ===
The Bill passed its third reading on 15 August 2023 by a margin of 72 (Labour, Greens, and Kerekere) to 47 (National, ACT, Te Paati Māori, and Whaitiri). Labour MPs Parker, Brooking, Twyford, Warren-Clark, Sarah Pallett, Dan Rosewarne, and Sosene and Green MP Sage spoke in favour of the Bill. National MPs Bishop, Simpson, Kuriger, Potaka, Smith and ACT MP Court opposed the Bill. The Bill received royal assent on 23 August 2023.

=== Repeal ===
Following the 2023 New Zealand general election, the National-led coalition government repealed the Spatial Planning Act and Natural and Built Environment Act on 23 December 2023. The country reverted back to the Resource Management Act 1991 while the Government worked on introducing new replacement legislation.
