= Natural Environment Act 2026 =

Act of Parliament in New Zealand

New Zealand Parliament
- Royal assent: 30 September 2026

Legislative history
- Introduced by: Chris Bishop
- Committee responsible: Environment Select Committee
- First reading: 9 December 2025
- Second reading: 4 August 2026
- Third reading: 22 September 2026
- Status: Current legislation

The Natural Environment Act 2026 is one of two Acts of Parliament in New Zealand, along with the Planning Act 2026, that replaces the Resource Management Act 1991. Together, the two laws govern the management of natural resources in New Zealand such as land, air and water. The two companion bills passed their first reading on 16 December 2025 and were referred to the New Zealand Parliament's environment select committee. On 22 September 2026, the Natural Environment and Planning Bills passed their third readings. It received royal assent on 30 September 2026.

== Background ==
In 2020, the Randerson report recommended that the New Zealand Government repeal and replace the Resource Management Act 1991, which governs the management of natural resources in the country. In February 2021, the Sixth Labour Government announced that it would introduce three new replacement laws: the Natural and Built Environment Act 2023 (NBA), the Spatial Planning Act 2023 (SPA), and the Climate Change Adaptation Bill (CAA). Prior to the dissolution of the 53rd New Zealand Parliament before the 2023 New Zealand general election, Parliament managed to pass the NBA and SPA bills into law on 15 August 2023.

On 19 December 2023, the NBA and SPA laws were repealed by the incoming Sixth National Government, which indicated that it would introduce its own replacement laws. On 20 September 2024, RMA Reform Minister Chris Bishop announced that the Government would introduce two new laws to replace the Resource Management Act 1991. One law would focus on managing the environmental effects of development activities while the second would enable urban development and infrastructure. On 24 March 2025, Bishop and Parliamentary Under-Secretary for the Minister for Infrastructure and RMA reform Simon Court announced details about the new legislative framework that would replace the RMA system. This included a new Natural Environment Bill focusing on the use, protection and enhancement of the natural environment, and a Planning Bill focusing on land use and development. Reflecting the government's priorities, the new RMA-replacement system would focus on the economic concept of externalities and property rights while ensuring environmental protections and safeguards.

== Key provisions ==
=== Purpose and goals ===
The purpose of the Natural Environment Act 2026 is to establish a framework for the use, protection and enhancement of the natural environment. It requires the New Zealand Crown to recognise its responsibilities in relation to the Treaty of Waitangi and to seek to enter into agreements to uphold Treaty of Waitangi claims and settlements.

Key goals of the Natural Environment Act include enabling the use and development of natural resources within environmental limits; safeguarding the life-supporting capacity of air, water, soil and ecosystems; protecting human health from the harm cause by the discharge of contaminants; protecting indigenous biodiversity; managing the effects of natural hazards through planning; and protecting Māori interests in the planning process, protecting significant Māori sites and facilitating the development and protection of Māori land.

=== Key instruments ===
Key instruments of the Natural Environment Act include national policy directions, national standards, regional spatial plans and natural environment plans. The Act also outlines the framework and procedures of the bill's instruments. It also outlines duties and restrictions on the usage of land, coastal marine areas, river and lake beds, and water. It also covers the discharge of contaminants and waste management including those from ships and offshore installations. The Act also contains provisions for continuing certain activities through a permit process. It also requires users to avoid, minimise or remedy adverse effects on natural resources and people.

The Natural Environment Act outlines the framework for environmental, human health and ecosystem limits including the use of management units and methodologies. It also outlines the framework for regional councils to implement action plans for managing resources, caps on resource use and to avoid or remedy breaches of environmental limits. The Bill also outlines the criteria for Ministers and regional councils to develop and implement national instruments for natural environment planning.

The Natural Environment Act also outlines the frameworks for developing national policy directions, national standards and regulations for the environment and fishing, and natural environmental plans. It also provides criteria for the Environment Court to give directions on lands affected by natural environment plans.

=== Permits and miscellaneous provisions ===
The Acflt also outlines the frameworks for applying for natural resource permits for navigation, aquaculture, and customary marine titles. It also outlines the process for notification, submissions and hearings. The Act also contains criteria for natural resource permits filed under the law. Natural resource permits also need to consider the impact on people, the environment and water infrastructure systems. The Act also outlines the appeal process to the Environment Court, and the conditions for cancelling or reviewing permits.

The Natural Environment Act also outlines the market allocation process, comparative permitting processes and the roles of both central and local governments. Central government and regional councils are required to keep records about Māori iwi (tribes) and hapu (clans). It also outlines the criteria for regional councils to transfer functions, powers or responsibilities to local or community boards.

The Act also contains provisions for marine areas and activities including aquaculture, permits and consulting with regard authorities. It also contains provisions for water conservation orders, and freshwater farm plans. The Act also contains amendments for other laws including the Fast-track Approvals Act 2024 and the Marine and Coastal Area (Takutai Moana) Act 2011.

=== Enforcement ===
The Act also outlines the enforcement powers of the Environmental Protection Authority (EPA) and Environment Court. It also outlines offences against the Act and various penalties and liabilities including fines and infringement notices. The Act also provides a framework for emergency works and powers to take preventive or remedial action. It also empowers the Governor-General of New Zealand, at the recommendation of the Government, to issue regulations relating to the Natural Environment and Planning Bills.

== Legislative passage ==
=== Introduction and first reading ===
On 9 December 2025, the Sixth National Government introduced both the Natural Environment and Planning Bills into Parliament, with the goal of passing them into law in late 2026. These two laws are expected to come into effect in 2029. Key policies have included reducing the over 100 policy statements and plans to 17 Regional Combined plans, requiring local councils to compensate property owners when their property rights are affected by regulation, creating a new framework of "national instruments" that would include iwi input and environmental safeguards, and standardising zoning rules. On 16 December, the Natural Environment and Planning Bills passed their first readings and were referred to the Environment select committee. The opposition Labour Party joined the ruling National, ACT and New Zealand First parties in supporting its passage to the select committee level, while the Green and Māori parties opposed the proposed bills.

=== Select committee stage ===
Public submissions on the Natural Environment and Planning Bills concluded on 13 February 2026. Kaupapa Māori environmental expert and Poipoia consultancy founder Tina Porou and law lecturer Luke Fitzmaurice-Brown expressed concern that the new RMA replacement bills would weaken Treaty of Waitangi protections, environmental safeguards and limit the ability of Māori iwi and hapu to participate in decisions affecting environmental management under the pretext of eliminating red tape.

On 20 July, the Environment select committee released its report on both the Natural Environment and Planning Bills. By majority vote, the committee voted to recommend that the House of Representatives pass the bills. They also recommended several amendments including:

- Widening the definition of "built environment" to include the surface of water in a coastal madine area.
- That "natural resources" include land being managed under the Planning Bill, while specifying that humans are not "natural resources."
- Clarifying that the bed of braided rivers can be set in national standards.
- Inserting a definition for infrastructure across both bills, which covers "green infrastructure."
- Exempting Crown activities on public conservation land from the Natural Environment Bill's land use controls.
- Clarifying the framework for consulting with both Māori groups and local councils.

That same day, Prime Minister Christopher Luxon and RMA Minister Chris Bishop confirmed that the Government would remove references relating to the Mana Whakahono ā Rohe agreements between local councils and Māori iwi from both the Natural Environment and Planning Bills. These agreements would instead be replaced by "iwi participation agreements," which would have a narrower scope. Federated Farmers and the New Zealand Taxpayers' Union had lobbied against these council-iwi agreements. In response, the opposition Labour, Green and Māori parties criticised the proposed replacement laws for their regulatory relief provisions for landlords and weakening environmental regulations in favour of private property and extraction interests. Labour leader Chris Hipkins expressed concern that the scrapping of council-iwi agreements would lead to the "relitigating" of existing Treaty of Waitangi settlements. Similarly, Ngāti Hine chair Rowena Tana and Northland Regional Council chair Pita Tipene said that scrapping the council-iwi agreements would undermine relations between local councils and iwi groups.

=== Second reading ===
On 4 August, Parliament voted along party lines to accept the amendments to the Natural Environment Bill proposed by the Environment select committee and to progress the bill. While National, ACT and New Zealand First supported the bill's passage at second reading, it was opposed by the Labour, Green, Māori parties, and independent MPs Tākuta Ferris and Mariameno Kapa-Kingi. That same day, the Planning Bill also passed its second reading.

=== Third reading ===
On 22 September 2026, the Natural Environment and Planning Bills passed their third readings along partisan lines. While National, ACT and NZ First supported the bills, they were opposed by the Labour, Green and Māori parties.

The Natural Environment Act 2026 received royal assent on 30 September.
