= Infrastructure New Zealand =

Industry association

- Infrastructure New Zealand Incorporated
- Predecessor: New Zealand Council for Infrastructure Development
- Formation: 3 August 2004; 22 years ago
- Type: Non-governmental organisation
- Location: New Zealand
- Chief Executive: Nick Leggett
- Key people: Tracey Ryan, Chair
- Website: infrastructure.org.nz

Infrastructure New Zealand (formerly New Zealand Council for Infrastructure Development) is an industry association that promotes national infrastructure development through research, advocacy and public and private sector collaboration. The members come from diverse sectors across New Zealand including equity owners, service providers, public sector agencies, and major infrastructure users.

== History ==
The organisation was originally formed as the New Zealand Council for Infrastructure Development, and was first incorporated in August 2004. It was renamed as Infrastructure New Zealand in April 2017.

== Criticisms of the Resource Management Act ==
During a visit to Whangarei in February 2020, the Chief Executive of Infrastructure New Zealand, Paul Blair, called for major changes to the Resource Management Act 1991. Blair advocated for the Act to be replaced by a sustainable development act that would refer to a set of national environmental standards. Development would be able to proceed where it could meet those standards. He criticized the way that the present Act allows the views of a local community to over-ride the best interest of a wider region, and urged that social, cultural and economic perspectives must be considered in regional development decision making, not just environmental impacts.

As part of planning for economic recovery following the COVID-19 pandemic, the Minister for the Environment announced on 3 May 2020 that the Government would amend the law to allow fast-tracking of selected projects through the RMA. The announcement was welcomed by Infrastructure New Zealand. In a statement on 4 May, the Chief Executive said that “the RMA has become a litigious, cumbersome, and complex piece of legislation. It was never intended to be applied the way it has been, and it was not designed to facilitate recovery from something like the COVID-19 lockdown”.

== Response to COVID-19 impact ==
In response to the COVID-19 lockdown ordered by Government on 25 March 2020, the Chief Executive of Infrastructure New Zealand, Paul Blair noted that the construction sector was already in a precarious situation prior to the pandemic, and that one third of all construction jobs were at risk within months. He urged the Government to create sector-specific criteria that would allow the construction industry to return to work immediately, with appropriate health and safety measures in place.

After the Government announced an intention to stimulate the economy with investment in “shovel-ready” projects, competing views were expressed about the most appropriate sector to take this investment. Paul Blair said that the Government’s COVID-19 response provided a "once-in-a-generation chance to transform New Zealand" through infrastructure.

== Annual conference ==
Infrastructure New Zealand hosts an annual conference "Building Nations". The theme for the 2022 Building Nations conference was 'Building Nations 2050'. The event looked back from the vantage point of 2050 when New Zealand will have hopefully delivered on the first New Zealand infrastructure strategy, achieved net-zero greenhouse gas emissions and be reaping the benefits of the suite of structural reforms currently underway. Top of mind at the conference was the challenge to create a system resilient to shocks and able to adapt to and anticipate key barriers to achieving the sector's shared ambitions.

In 2023 the conference will be held on June 7-8 in Christchurch at Te Pae Convention Centre. The theme will be 'moving from ambition to action'. The discussions will build on 2022's theme to look at the practicalities of delivering the infrastructure that New Zealanders urgently need within the context of massive system change and the need to commit to bold action as New Zealand heads towards a national election.

== Publications ==
- Evaluating the environmental outcomes of the RMA – A report by the Environmental Defence Society – June 2016
- Building National Infrastructure Capability: Lessons from Scotland – June 2017
- Benefits from Auckland road decongestion – July 2017
- Meeting Auckland’s Growth Challenge: The Innovation City – Discussion Document – October 2017
- Gender Diversity for Engineering Professional Services – Workshop Summary Report – December 2017
- Enabling City Growth – Lessons from the USA – June 2018
- Creating Value through Procurement – A report into public sector procurement of major infrastructure projects – August 2018
- National Development – Insights from Asia – June 2019
- Building Regions – A vision for local government planning law and funding reform – August 2019

== See also ==
- Minister for Infrastructure (New Zealand)
- Local government in New Zealand
- New Zealand Infrastructure Commission
