= Planning Act 2026 =

Act of Parliament in New Zealand

New Zealand Parliament
- Royal assent: 30 September 2026

Legislative history
- Introduced by: Chris Bishop
- Committee responsible: Environment Select Committee
- First reading: 9 December 2025
- Second reading: 4 August 2026
- Third reading: 22 September 2026
- Status: Current legislation

The Planning Act 2026 is one of two Acts of Parliament in New Zealand, along with the Natural Environment Act 2026, that replaces the Resource Management Act 1991. Together, the two laws govern the management of natural resources such as land, air and water. The two companion bills passed their first reading on 16 December 2025 and were referred to the New Zealand Parliament's environment select committee. On 22 September 2026, the Planning and Natural Environment Bills passed their third readings. They received royal assent on 30 September.

== Background ==
In 2020, the Randerson report recommended that the New Zealand Government repeal and replace the Resource Management Act 1991, which governs the management of natural resources. In February 2021, the Sixth Labour Government announced that it would introduce three new replacement laws: the Natural and Built Environment Act 2023 (NBA), the Spatial Planning Act 2023 (SPA), and the Climate Change Adaptation Bill (CAA). Prior to the dissolution of the 53rd New Zealand Parliament before the 2023 New Zealand general election, Parliament managed to pass the NBA and SPA bills into law on 15 August 2023.

On 19 December 2023, the NBA and SPA laws were repealed by the Sixth National Government, which indicated that it would introduce its own replacement laws. On 20 September 2024, RMA Reform Minister Chris Bishop announced that the Government would introduce two new laws to replace the Resource Management Act 1991. One law would focus on managing the environmental effects of development activities while the second would enable urban development and infrastructure. On 24 March 2025, Bishop and Parliamentary Under-Secretary for the Minister for Infrastructure and RMA reform Simon Court announced details about the new legislative framework that would replace the RMA system. This included a new Planning Bill focusing on land use and development and a Natural Environment Bill focusing on the use, protection and enhancement of the natural environment. The new RMA-replacement system would focus on the economic concept of externalities and property rights while ensuring environmental protections and safeguards.

== Key provisions ==
=== Purpose and goals ===
The Planning Act 2026's purpose is to establish a framework for planning and regulating the use, development and enjoyment of land. It has provisions recognising the New Zealand Crown's Treaty of Waitangi obligations by requiring the central Government and local authorities to consult with Māori iwi (tribes) and customary marine title groups regarding the implementation of regional spatial plans and land use plans. The Planning Act also requires the Crown to enter into agreements to uphold Treaty of Waitangi claims and settlements.

Key foundations of the Planning Act include ensuring that land use does not unreasonably affect others; supports economic growth by ensuring land use and development; planning and providing for necessary infrastructure for land development; maintaining public access to coastal areas, lakes, rivers, wetlands and other significant land sites; and safeguarding Māori interests in the development of natural instruments, spatial planning and land use plans.

=== Key instruments and criteria ===
Key instruments of the Planning Act include the national policy direction, national standards, spatial plans and land use plans. The Act outlines their hierarchy and roles in relation to the companion Natural Environment Bill. The Act's scope includes the management of natural resources with high natural characters, outstanding natural landscapes and features, historically significant sites, sites significant to Māori and the effects of natural hazards.

The Planning Act outlines the criteria for land use including building structures and mitigating adverse effects. The Act also outlines the criteria and process for applying for consents under the Planning Act including navigation and customary marine titles. It also outlines the hearing and decision-making process for consents.

=== Powers and responsibilities ===
The Planning Act also outlines the functions, powers and responsibilities of central and local government bodies including keeping records about iwi and hapu (clans). It would also require chief executives to prepare and maintain a system performance framework. The Act also outlines the framework for local authorities, the Environmental Protection Authority (EPA) and Environment Court to enforce the provisions of the Act. It also outlines the framework for offences against the Planning Act and the inspection powers of relevant authorities.

The Planning and Natural Environment Acts require local authorities to hold hearings into the preparation of first land use plans and the regional natural environment plan. The Planning Act also outlines the transition process for the phasing out of the Resource Management Act 1991. The Act also has provisions for regulatory relief in the event that a plan has a significant impact on the use of land.

The Act also outlines the criteria for convening independent hearing panels, the spatial planning process, the construction projects, consent applications, survey plans, esplanade reserves and strips, compensation, and reclamation plans. It also outlines the enforcement powers of the EPA and the criteria for financial assurances by central and local government entities. The Planning Act also outlines the framework, composition, powers and procedures of the Environment Court and Planning Tribunal.

=== Miscellaneous ===
The Planning Act also outlines amendments to the Resource Management Act 1991 and other relevant legislation including the Fast-track Approvals Act 2024.

== Legislative passage ==
=== Introduction and first reading ===
On 9 December 2025, the Government introduced both the Planning and Natural Environment Bills into Parliament, with the goal of passing them into law in late 2026. These two laws are expected to come into effect in 2029. Key policies have included reducing the over 100 policy statements and plans to 17 Regional Combined plans, requiring local councils to compensate property owners when their property rights are affected by regulation, creating a new framework of "national instruments" that would include iwi input and environmental safeguards, and standardising zoning rules. On 16 December, the Planning and Natural Environment Bills passed their first readings and were referred to the Environment select committee. The Labour joined the National, ACT and New Zealand First parties in supporting its passage to the select committee level, while the Green and Māori parties opposed the proposed bills.

=== Select committee stage ===
Public submissions on the Planning and Natural Environment Bills concluded on 13 February 2026. Kaupapa Māori environmental expert and Poipoia consultancy founder Tina Porou and law lecturer Luke Fitzmaurice-Brown expressed concern that the new RMA replacement bills would weaken Treaty of Waitangi protections, environmental safeguards and limit the ability of Māori iwi and hapu to participate in decisions affecting environmental management under the pretext of eliminating red tape.

On 20 July, the Environment select committee released its report on both the Planning and Natural Environment Bills. By majority vote, the committee voted to recommend that the House of Representatives pass the bills. They also recommended several amendments to the Planning Bill including:

- Emphasising the "enjoyment of land" within the legislative framework.
- Clarifying the language around facilitating housing, urban development and infrastructural development. Emphasising long-term thinking.
- Outlining the framework for the New Zealand Crown's cooperation with Māori on issues relating to the Treaty of Waitangi including settlements.
- Clarity around national policy directions (NPDs) and national instruments.
- Clarity around regional spatial plans, local government input and responsibilities and the transition system.

That same day, Prime Minister Christopher Luxon and RMA Minister Chris Bishop confirmed that the Government would remove references relating to the Mana Whakahono ā Rohe agreements between local councils and Māori iwi from both the Planning and Natural Environment Bills. These agreements would instead be replaced by narrower "iwi participation agreements." Federated Farmers and the New Zealand Taxpayers' Union had lobbied against these council-iwi agreements. In response, the opposition Labour, Green and Māori parties criticised the proposed replacement laws for their regulatory relief provisions for landlords and for weakening environmental regulations in favour of private property and extraction interests. Labour leader Chris Hipkins expressed concern that the scrapping of council-iwi agreements would lead to the "relitigating" of existing Treaty of Waitangi settlements. Similarly, Ngāti Hine chair Rowena Tana and Northland Regional Council chair Pita Tipene said that scrapping the council-iwi agreements would undermine relations between local councils and iwi groups.

=== Second reading ===
On 4 August 2026, Parliament voted along party lines to accept the amendments to the Planning Bill proposed by the Environment select committee and to progress the bill. While National, ACT and New Zealand First supported the bill's passage at second reading, it was opposed by the Labour, Green, Māori parties, and independent MPs Tākuta Ferris and Mariameno Kapa-Kingi. That same day, the Natural Environment Bill also passed its second reading.

=== Third reading ===
On 22 September 2026, the Planning and Natural Environment Bills passed their third readings along party lines. While National, ACT and New Zealand First supported the bills, they were opposed by the opposition Labour, Green and Māori parties.

They received royal assent on 30 September.
