= National Policy Statement =

A National Policy Statement is created by governments to establish a consistent policy on an issue across a nation.

- National Policy Statement (New Zealand)
- National Policy Statement (United Kingdom)
