= New Zealand Infrastructure Commission =

National oversight and planning agency

- Te Waihanga

Crown Entity overview
- Formed: 25 September 2019
- Jurisdiction: New Zealand
- Headquarters: Wellington
- Minister responsible: Chris Bishop, Minister for Infrastructure
- Crown Entity executives: Alan Bollard, Board chair; Geoff Cooper, Chief executive
- Website: tewaihanga.govt.nz

The New Zealand Infrastructure Commission (Māori: Te Waihanga) (Infracom) is an autonomous Crown entity. It has primary functions of long-term strategy and planning for infrastructure, as well as procurement and delivery advice and support for major projects.

== Establishment ==
Prior to the establishment of Infracom, the Treasury was responsible for producing the Thirty Year New Zealand Infrastructure Plan, the Capital Intentions Plan, the Infrastructure Evidence Base, and the State of Infrastructure Reports. The historical documents published by Treasury include the 2015 issue of the 30 year Infrastructure Plan

The legislation to formally establish the Infrastructure Commission, Te Waihanga came into force on 25 September 2019 and the Commission is listed under Schedule 1 – Part 2 of the Crown Entities Act 2004.

At the launch of the Infrastructure Commission in February 2019, the Minister for Infrastructure, Shane Jones, said New Zealand has an "unprecedented infrastructure deficit" and the Commission was tasked with addressing that. Transport projects and urban infrastructure issues would likely be the focus of the new commission.

In August 2019, the Minister announced the appointment of Dr Alan Bollard, a former Reserve Bank governor as chair of the new Infrastructure Commission. In commenting on the announcement, the Minister said that the government had allocated $41 billion in the Budget to build schools, hospitals, houses, roads and public transport over the next five years.

Infracom will work with central and local government, the private sector, iwi and other stakeholders, and develop a 30-year infrastructure strategy that will replace the government's current 30-year plan. The first plan will be reported to government by the end of 2021 and thereafter at least every 5 years. The strategy will cover the ability of existing infrastructure to meet community expectations; current and future infrastructure needs and priorities; as well as any barriers which could impede the delivery of infrastructure or services arising from it.

The Treasury now monitors the performance of Infracom and provides advice to Ministers on the Commission's long-term infrastructure strategy and its other recommendations.

== Leadership ==
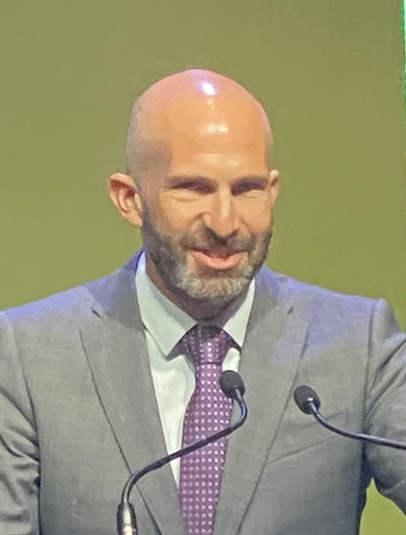
Cooper in March 2026

Ross Copland was chief executive from September 2020. His resignation was announced in June 2024. Geoff Cooper was appointed in September 2024 to succeed Copland.

== Infrastructure pipeline ==
Infracom collects and publishes searchable information about planned infrastructure projects (the pipeline).

On 29 January 2020, the Prime Minister announced a $12 billion package of infrastructure investments to be known as the New Zealand Upgrade Programme. In its quarterly update of the infrastructure pipeline in March 2020, Infracom said that it had incorporated nearly $7 billion of New Zealand Upgrade programme projects, bringing the estimated total value of the works pipeline to $33.2 billion.

== Publications ==
- Measuring the value and service outcomes of social infrastructure PPPs in Australia and New Zealand – April 2020
- Special Report – Waters Reform in New Zealand – September 2020

== See also ==
- Infrastructure New Zealand
