= Regions of New Zealand =

Top administrative divisions of New Zealand

- Location: New Zealand
- Created: 1 November 1989
- Number: 16 (as of 1 July 1992)
- Populations: 34,700 (West Coast) – 1,816,000 (Auckland)
- Areas: 450 km^{2} (172 sq mi) (Nelson) – 45,350 km^{2} (17,508 sq mi) (Canterbury)
- Government: Regional councils and unitary authorities

The regions of New Zealand are the administrative jurisdictions of the country's regional councils and unitary authorities; the country is divided into sixteen such areas. The councils derive their powers from the central government, as New Zealand is a unitary state rather than a federation.

Eleven are currently administered by regional councils, whilst the other five are administered by unitary authorities. (Note: Unitary authorities are territorial authorities that also have the powers of a regional council.) Most of New Zealand's outlying Islands are not included within its regions, with the Solander Islands being the exception as they are within the Southland Region. The Chatham Islands are not within any region, having their own specially legislated territorial authority.

== History and statutory basis ==
=== Legislative framework ===
The regional councils are listed in Part 1 of Schedule 2 of the Local Government Act 2002, along with reference to the Gazette notices that established them in 1989. The act requires regional councils to promote sustainable development – the social, economic, environmental and cultural well-being of their communities.

The current regions and most of their councils came into being through a local government reform in 1989 that took place under the Local Government Act 1974. The regional councils replaced the more than 700 ad hoc bodies that had been formed in the preceding century – roads boards, catchment boards, drainage boards, pest control boards, harbour boards, domain and reserve boards. In addition they took over some roles that had previously been performed by county councils.

The boundaries of the regions are based largely on drainage basins. This anticipated the responsibilities of the Resource Management Act 1991. Most regional boundaries conform with territorial authority boundaries but there are a number of exceptions. An example is Taupō District, split between four regions, although most of its area is in the Waikato region. There is often a high degree of co-operation between regional and territorial councils as they have complementary roles.

=== Resource management functions ===
Regional councils have these specific functions under the Resource Management Act 1991:

- Planning for the integrated management of natural and physical resources
- Planning for regionally significant land uses
- Soil conservation, water quality and quantity, water ecosystems, natural hazards, hazardous substances
- Controlling the coastal marine area
- Controlling via resource consents the taking, use, damming or diverting of water
- Controlling via resource consents the discharge of contaminants
- Establishing of rules in a regional plan to allocate water
- Controlling via resource consents the beds of waterbodies

=== Other functions ===
Regional councils have responsibility for functions under other statutes;

- flood and river control under the Soil Conservation and Rivers Control Act 1941,
- reserves vested in regional councils under the Reserves Act 1977,
- civil defence under the Civil Defence Act 1990,
- regional pest management under the Biosecurity Act 1993,
- harbour and water navigation under the Maritime Transport Act 1994,
- hazardous waste under the HSNO Act 1996,
- public transport planning under the Land Transport Act 1998, and
- supervision of the safety of dams under the Building Act 2004.

=== Proposed abolition ===
In mid 2025, Prime Minister Christopher Luxon and Regional Development Minister Shane Jones proposed scrapping the 11 regional councils as part of the Sixth National Government's proposed overhaul of the Resource Management Act 1991. In late November 2025, Local Government Minister Simon Watts and RMA Reform Minister Chris Bishop confirmed the Government would seek to abolish regional councils and transfer their responsibilities to the 67 local district and city councils.

The Government has released two replacement proposals. First, abolishing elected regional councillors and replacing them with combined territories boards, which would consist of the mayors of the district councils within the former regions. While the regional councils as organisations would remain, they would be run by the mayors of the constituent regions. The Government's second proposal would be to get the combined territories boards to prepare a regional reorganisation plan within two years of their establishment, subject to approval by the Local Government Minister. These plans would focus on the delivery of infrastructure, public services and regulatory functions, and would be tested against criteria based on housing, infrastructure, and manageable rates services. Public consultation on the proposed legislative changes was open until 20 February 2026. The legislation is expected to be introduced in mid-2026 with the goal of passing it into law by 2027.

The Government's proposal to abolish the regional councils attracted a mixture of reactions. The proposal was supported by Otago Regional councillor Michael Laws and Dunedin City councillor Lee Vandervis, who described the regional councils as an "excessive level" of bureaucracy and argued that their dissolution would lower rates and red tape. By contrast, the proposal was opposed by Mayor of Wellington Andrew Little, Otago Regional councillor Alan Somerville, Te Wānanga o Raukawa environmental planning lecturer Mahina-a-rangi Baker, Te Rūnanga o Makaawhio chair Paul Madgwick and Mayor of Dunedin Sophie Barker on the grounds that abolishing the regional councils would erode environmental protections, reduce Māori input in regional-level decision-making, infringe on Treaty of Waitangi obligations and add further to mayors and territorial authorities' workloads. Meanwhile, Mayor of Central Otago Tamah Alley, Mayor of Gisborne Rehette Stoltz and Labour leader Chris Hipkins expressed concerns about accountability, the loss of technical expertise, and the nature of the proposed reforms.

In mid-February 2026, several Otago regional councillors criticised the Government's proposal to replace the regional councils. Michael Laws described the proposal as "poorly written, drafted by bureaucrats who used AI when it was in a hallucination state and drawn up by people who had not passed their NCEA literacy tests." Instead, Laws advocated maintaining the Otago Regional Council and a unitary authority based on the Auckland Council. Gretchen Robertson said that the restructure could lead to fragmentation while Neil Gillespie described local government as something "that was not simple." By early April 2026, the Otago Daily Times reported that the Government had backed away on plans to proceed with replacing the regional councils with combined territorial boards following feedback from regional councils and territorial authorities. The Government indicated that it would instead focus on passing its two RMA replacement laws in 2026. On 30 April, Otago Regional Council chair Hilary Calvert confirmed that the Government had abandoned plans to replace the regional councils with combined territories boards before the end of the 54th New Zealand Parliamentary term following a meeting with New Zealand First Member of Parliament Mark Patterson.

By early May 2026, several district and regional councils in Northland, Taranaki, the West Coast, Waikato, the Bay of Plenty, Wairarapa, Hawke's Bay, Wellington, Otago and Southland Regions were exploring options to merge into unitary authorities. On 5 May, the Local Government Minister Simon Watts and the RMA Reform Minister Chris Bishop issued local councils with a three-month timeframe to come up with amalgamation plans under the new "Head Start" approach. These amalgamation plans replaced the earlier proposed "combined territorial boards" and would be assessed by the newly-established Ministry for Cities, Environment, Regions and Transport (MCERT). Regional councils were excluded from the three-month merger consultation. In response, Environment Southland chair Jeremy McPhail expressed disappointment that regional councils had been excluded from making proposals on the amalgamation process but said they would continue advocating.

On 24 September 2026, the Government announced that it would delay making decisions on amalgamating local councils until after the 2026 New Zealand general election. On 18 November, the Local Government Commission (LGC) proposed Environment Southland with the Southland Region's three district councils (Gore District Council, Invercargill City Council, and the Southland District Council) into a new regional Southland Council. The LGC's proposal is separate from the Government's Head Start programme.

== Current regions ==
=== List of regions ===
	Name (name in Māori if different)	Regional council	Seats	Council seat	Land area		Population	Density		ISO 3166-2 Code
	Name (name in Māori if different)	Regional council	Seats	Council seat	km^{2}	sq mi	Population	per km^{2}	per sq mi	ISO 3166-2 Code
1	Northland; Te Tai Tokerau	Northland Regional Council	9	Whangārei	12,504	4,828	201,100	16.08	41.6	NZ-NTL
2	Auckland (Note: These regions have unitary authorities.); Tāmaki-makau-rau	Auckland Council	21	Auckland	4,941	1,908	1,816,000	367.54	951.9	NZ-AUK
3	Waikato	Waikato Regional Council	14	Hamilton	23,900	9,200	532,100	22.26	57.7	NZ-WKO
4	Bay of Plenty; Te Moana-a-Toi	Bay of Plenty Regional Council	14	Whakatāne	12,072	4,661	351,500	29.12	75.4	NZ-BOP
5	Gisborne (Note: The Gisborne Region is still widely but unofficially known by its former name East Cape or as the East Coast.); Te Tairāwhiti	Gisborne District Council	14	Gisborne	8,385	3,237	52,700	6.29	16.3	NZ-GIS
6	Hawke's Bay; Te Matau-a-Māui	Hawke's Bay Regional Council	11	Napier	14,138	5,459	179,700	12.71	32.9	NZ-HKB
7	Taranaki	Taranaki Regional Council	11	Stratford	7,254	2,801	130,300	17.96	46.5	NZ-TKI
8	Manawatū-Whanganui	Horizons Regional Council	12	Palmerston North	22,221	8,580	260,700	11.73	30.4	NZ-MWT
9	Wellington; Te Whanga-nui-a-Tara	Greater Wellington Regional Council	13	Wellington	8,049	3,108	543,400	67.51	174.9	NZ-WGN
10	Tasman; Te Tai-o-Aorere	Tasman District Council	13	Richmond	9,616	3,713	59,900	6.23	16.1	NZ-TAS
11	Nelson; Whakatū	Nelson City Council	13	Nelson	422	163	54,300	128.67	333.3	NZ-NSN
12	Marlborough; Te Tauihu-o-te-waka	Marlborough District Council	14	Blenheim	10,458	4,038	50,800	4.84	12.5	NZ-MBH
13	West Coast; Te Tai Poutini	West Coast Regional Council	7	Greymouth	23,245	8,975	34,700	1.49	3.9	NZ-WTC
14	Canterbury; Waitaha	Environment Canterbury	14	Christchurch	44,504	17,183	698,200	15.69	40.6	NZ-CAN
15	Otago; Ōtākou	Otago Regional Council	12	Dunedin	31,186	12,041	253,900	8.14	21.1	NZ-OTA
16	Southland; Murihiku	Southland Regional Council	12	Invercargill	31,196	12,045	104,800	3.36	8.7	NZ-STL

=== Areas outside regional boundaries ===
Regions (indicated by colour) displayed over territorial authorities

Some outlying islands are not included within regional boundaries. The Chatham Islands is not in a region, although its council has some of the powers of a regional council under the Resource Management Act 1991. The Kermadecs and the subantarctic islands are inhabited only by a small number of Department of Conservation staff and there is no regional council for these islands.

=== Governance ===
Regional councils are popularly elected every three years in accordance with the Local Electoral Act 2001. Councils may use a first-past-the-post or single transferable vote system. The chairperson is selected by the elected council members.

=== Finances ===
Regional councils are funded through property rates, subsidies from central government, income from trading, and user charges for certain public services. Councils set their own levels of rates, though the mechanism for collecting it usually involves channelling through the territorial authority collection system.

== Regional chairs ==
List of current regional chairs
Region	Chair	Affiliation	Elected
Northland	Pita Tipene	Independent	5 November 2025
Waikato	Warren Maher	Rates Control Team	29 October 2025
Bay of Plenty	Matemoana McDonald	Independent	October 2025
Hawke's Bay	Sophie Siers	Independent	29 October 2025
Taranaki	Craig Williamson	Independent	18 February 2025
Manawatū-Whanganui	Nikki Riley	Independent	29 October 2025
Greater Wellington	Daran Ponter	Labour	October 2019
West Coast	Colin Smith	Independent	29 October 2025
Canterbury	Deon Swiggs	Independent	29 October 2025
Otago	Hilary Calvert	Vision Otago	29 October 2025
Southland	Jeremy McPhail	Independent	October 2025

== Predecessors of current structure ==
=== Auckland ===
The Auckland Regional Council (now the Auckland Council) was preceded by the Auckland Regional Authority (ARA), which existed from 1963 to 1989.

=== Wellington ===
The Wellington Regional Council was first formed in 1980 from a merger of the Wellington Regional Planning Authority and the Wellington Regional Water Board.

=== United councils ===
In 1978, legislation was passed enabling the formation of regions that had united councils. Twenty regions were designated, excluding the Auckland and Wellington areas. For most of the country this was the first time there had been a regional level of government since the abolition of provinces in 1876. Councillors were not elected directly – they were appointed from the various territorial local authorities (TLAs) within the region.

The only responsibilities mandated by the legislation were coordination of civil defence and development of a regional plan, although the constituent TLAs could agree on additional responsibilities at the point of formation of each united council. For example, in a number of cases the united council took responsibility for the allocation of revenue from regional petrol taxes.

The united councils were based in the facilities of the largest TLA in the region and largely dependent on the TLAs for resources. They were allowed to levy rates but in most cases had minimal operating budgets (below $100,000 per annum). The notable exception was Canterbury, where the united council had a number of responsibilities. Only one united council undertook any direct operational activity – a forestry project in Wanganui.

List of united councils
Region	When formed	Levy rates (1982/83)
Northland	January 1980	$118,000
Thames Valley	July 1980	$46,000
Waikato	October 1980	$36,000
Bay of Plenty	August 1979	$17,000
Tongariro	November 1979	$50,000
East Cape	August 1979	$16,000
Hawke's Bay	December 1983	–
Taranaki	February 1979	$60,000
Wanganui	May 1979	$81,000
Wairarapa	November 1978	$33,000
Manawatu	May 1981	0
Horowhenua	June 1980	$47,000
Nelson Bays	November 1978	$84,000
Marlborough	December 1978	$30,000
Canterbury	May 1979	$605,000
West Coast	November 1978	$32,000
Aorangi	1983	–
Coastal / North Otago	April 1983	–
Clutha / Central Otago	November 1980	$33,000
Southland	May 1979	$88,000

Source: Summary of the Functions and Activities of United Councils. Dept of Internal Affairs, 1984.

== See also ==
- List of regions of New Zealand by Human Development Index
- Local Government New Zealand
- Provinces of New Zealand
