= Resource Management Act 1991 =

1991 New Zealand law

New Zealand Parliament
- Long title: An Act to restate and reform the law relating to the use of land, air, and water.
- Royal assent: 22 July 1991
- Commenced: 1 October 1991

Legislative history
- Introduced by: Simon Upton
- Passed: 22 July 1991

Amended by
- 1993, 1994, 1996, 1997, 2002, 2003, 2004, 2005

Related legislation
- Crown Minerals Act 1991
- Status: Current legislation

The Resource Management Act (RMA) passed in 1991 in New Zealand is a significant, and at times, controversial Act of Parliament. The RMA promotes the sustainable management of natural and physical resources such as land, air and water. New Zealand's Ministry for the Environment describes the RMA as New Zealand's principal legislation for environmental management.

The RMA and the decisions made under it by district and regional councils and in courts affect both individuals and businesses in large numbers, and often in very tangible ways. The Act has variously been attacked for being ineffective in managing adverse environmental effects, or overly time-consuming and expensive and concerned with bureaucratic restrictions on legitimate economic activities.

The Sixth Labour Government planned to replace the RMA with two separate acts: the Natural and Built Environment Act 2023 (NBA), and the Spatial Planning Act 2023 (SPA); and planned to add the Climate Change Adaptation Bill (CAA). Following the 2023 New Zealand general election, the National-led coalition government repealed Labour's NBA and SPA legislation. It also promised to reform the RMA and eventually replace it with new resource management laws. In September 2026, Parliament passed two laws replacing the Resource Management Act: the Planning Act 2026 and the Natural Environment Act 2026.

== Significance ==
The adoption of the RMA was significant for three reasons. Firstly, the RMA established one integrated framework that replaced the many previous resource-use regimes, which had been fragmented between agencies and sectors, such as land use, forestry, pollution, traffic, zoning, water and air.

Secondly, the RMA was the first statutory planning regime to incorporate the principle of sustainability.

Thirdly, the RMA incorporated 'sustainable management', as an explicitly stated purpose placed at the heart of the regulatory framework and this purpose is to direct all other policies, standards, plans and decision-making under the RMA. Having the purpose of the RMA at the apex of an unambiguous legislative hierarchy was a unique concept worldwide at the time of the law's inception.

== Related legislations ==
The RMA replaced a large number of acts, regulations and orders. A total of 59 Acts and amended Acts were repealed (see RMA Sixth Schedule), and nineteen regulations and orders were revoked (Seventh Schedule). The notable acts repealed were the Water and Soil Conservation Act 1967 and the Town and Country Planning Act 1977. The mining and minerals regime was separated from the Resource Management Bill at the third reading stage and was enacted as the Crown Minerals Act 1991.

However, three of these statutes, provided important elements of the RMA. The Soil Conservation and Rivers Control Act 1941 provided the precedent for catchment-based entities and catchment boards became part of the new regional councils. The Town and Country Planning Act 1977 provided the consenting and planning procedures. The Water and Soil Conservation Act 1967 provided the consenting regime and case law for water.

== Beginnings ==
Following the National Party's antipathy to environmental issues in the 1980s, as expressed in the Think Big economic development projects and the National Development Act, the New Zealand Labour Party went into the 1984 election campaign with a platform of reforming planning and local government institutions and adopting better environmental policies. The reform policy involved creating an integrated resource decision-making system to replace the existing sectoral based system. The Labour Party environment policy, such as this quote from Part I, paragraph 3, owed much to the Brundtland Commission's concept of sustainable development;

to ensure the management of the human use of the biosphere to yield the greatest sustainable benefits to present generations while maintaining the potential to meet the goods and aspirations of future generations

== Resource Management Law Reform ==
In the 1987 election the fourth Labour Government won a second term in office and deputy prime minister Geoffrey Palmer became the Minister for the Environment. Palmer initiated a comprehensive reform project for New Zealand's environmental and planning laws. This was the Resource Management Law Reform or RMLR. Palmer's objectives explicitly included giving effect to the Treaty of Waitangi, cost-effective use of resources, the World Conservation Strategy, intergenerational equity, and intrinsic values of ecosystems. Palmer chaired a Cabinet committee supervising a core group of four people supported by the Ministry for the Environment. The core group developed policy through a series of 32 working papers and through extensive public consultation. In December 1988, the reform proposals were published. In December 1989, Palmer introduced the 314-page Resource Management Bill to the Parliament of New Zealand. The Select Committee reported back to the House on 14 August,1990, but the Committee of the Whole House stage was not completed before the general election of 1990, which Labour lost. However, the new National Minister for the Environment, Simon Upton, continued the law reform process leading to the enactment of the RMA.

== Final drafting of the RMA ==
The new Minister, Simon Upton, noted the divergent views of submitters on the proposed purpose and principles of the Bill. A Cabinet paper of 10 March 1989 argued that the overall objectives and the broad philosophy of the Bill should be stated in a purpose section and clarified in a section on fundamental principles. After the 1990 election, Simon Upton appointed a Review Group to assess the purpose and principle clauses. The group consisted of: Tony Randerson, a lawyer, as chair; Prue Crosson (now Prue Kapua), a lawyer; environmentalist Guy Salmon; planner Ken Tremaine; and Brent Wheeler, an economist.

The Review Group considered that the clauses had become a conflicting 'shopping list' of matters advanced by interest groups, with no clear priority. That would result in the 'trading off' or balancing of socio-economic and biophysical aspects. They rejected such a balancing approach in favour of use within biophysical constraints. They considered that the Bill should not have a purpose of sustainable development with a focus on social justice and wealth redistribution. They concluded that purpose of the Bill should be 'sustainable management' and that the critical aspect of that purpose should be intergenerational equity, that is, safeguarding natural resource options for future generations. A second purpose of avoiding, remedying or mitigating adverse effects of activities was added. The purpose and principles sections were consequently rewritten.

Finally, with the approval of Cabinet, Simon Upton added the third 'sustainable management' purpose of 'safeguarding the life-supporting capacity of air, water, soil and ecosystems'.

Simon Upton stated in his third reading speech to Parliament that the purpose of the RMA was not concerned with planning and controlling economic activity, nor about trade-offs, but about sustaining, safeguarding, avoiding, remedying, and mitigating the adverse effects of the use of natural resources.

The Bill provides us with a framework to establish objectives with a biophysical bottom line that must not be compromised. Provided that those objectives are met, what people get up to is their affair. As such, the Bill provides a more liberal regime for developers. On the other hand, activities will have to be compatible with hard environmental standards and society will set those standards. Clause 4 sets out the biophysical bottom line. Clauses 5 and 6 set out further specific matters that expand on the issues. The Bill has a clear and rigorous procedure for the setting of environmental standards – and the debate will be concentrating on just where we set those standards.

== Part 2 Purpose and Principles ==
The result of Upton's input was that RMA was enacted with a Part 2 consisting of three 'principles' (sections 6,7 & 8) in an unambiguous hierarchy below the overarching purpose of 'sustainable management', set out in section 5. Under that section, the RMA has one specifically defined purpose; to promote the sustainable management of natural and physical resources.

=== Definition of sustainable management ===
The RMA, in Section 5, describes "sustainable management" as

managing the use, development and protection of natural and physical resources in a way, or at a rate which enables people and communities to provide for their social, economic, and cultural well-being and for their health and safety while-

(a) Sustaining the potential of natural and physical resources (excluding minerals) to meet the reasonably foreseeable needs of future generations; and

(b) Safeguarding the life-supporting capacity of air, water, soil, and ecosystem; and

(c) Avoiding, remedying or mitigating any adverse effects of activities on the environment.

=== Principles ===
Section 6 is a list of matters of national importance that shall be 'recognised and provided for' in achieving the purpose of the RMA;

- natural character of the coastal environment:
- outstanding natural features and landscapes:
- significant indigenous habitats and vegetation:
- public access to waterbodies:
- Māori culture, traditions, ancestral lands, water, sites, waahi tapu (sacred place), and taonga (belongings):
- historic heritage:
- recognised customary activities.

Section 7 is a list of matters that all decisions 'shall have particular regard to' in achieving the purpose of the RMA;

- Kaitiakitanga:
- stewardship:
- efficient use and development of natural and physical resources:
- efficiency of the end use of energy:
- amenity values:
- intrinsic values of ecosystems:
- quality of the environment:
- finite characteristics of natural and physical resources:
- habitat of trout and salmon:
- climate change:
- renewable energy.

Section 8 has the title "Treaty of Waitangi" and states that in achieving the purpose of the RMA, 'account shall be taken' of the principles of the Treaty of Waitangi.

=== Designations ===
Designations protect areas planned for future public works. Requiring authorities give notice of requirement for a designation to be included in a district plan to protect routes for roads, railways and other infrastructure.

=== Interpretation ===
Under the RMA virtually all significant uses of land, air, coastal, or water-related resources are regulated by provisions of the RMA or by rules in regional or district plans or by decisions on consent applications. Plans are to achieve the purpose of the RMA which is 'sustainable management' of natural and physical resources. Most rule-making and decision-making is expressly related back to the 'Purpose and Principles' section, Part II, which contains the statutory definition of 'sustainable management' in section 5. Consequently, the interpretation that is to be placed on the definition of 'sustainable management' will be of considerable importance.

Very soon after the enactment of the RMA, Fisher (1991) wrote a substantial legal analysis of the RMA showing that the definition of 'sustainable management' was possibly ambiguous. In spite of the 'biophysical bottom line' interpretation, as in Simon Upton's third reading speech, being perhaps the most grammatically correct, Fisher noted that a 'single integrated purpose' definition could be made where providing for human well-being was equal with and not subordinate to the 'bottom line' paragraphs a) to c) of s 5(2).

Some six years after the enactment of the RMA, several decisions on consent applications had been appealed to the Environment Court where s5 was given some degree of interpretation. By 1997, two interpretations of s5 were recognised, 'balancing ' and the 'environmental bottom line'. However, the only common ground among the varying interpretations was the lack of consistence in the reasoning.

Harris (2004) states that the "broad overall judgement" is most commonly accepted interpretation of sustainable management.

Skelton and Memon (2002) reviewed the introduction of sustainable development into the RMA and the evolution of case law that had led to the "broad overall judgement" interpretation. They also criticised Simon Upton and the Ministry for the Environment for interpreting 'sustainable management' in section 5(2) of the RMA as a matter of biophysical environmental bottom lines. Skelton and Memon concluded that the "broad overall judgement" (a 'weighing', rather than a 'balancing' approach) is the interpretation of 'sustainable management' now favoured by the Environment Court.

The 'broad overall judgement' approach is not without critics. Wheen (1997, 2002) argues that the broad overall judgement interpretation reduces 'sustainable management' to a balancing test with a bias towards tangible economic benefits over the intangible environmental concerns.

Upton et al. (2002) responded to Skelton and Memon's paper by noting that the Review Group on the draft resource management bill had quite intentionally drafted section 5(2) to emphasise biophysical constraints to move away from the overly broad and unweighted list of socio-economic and environmental objectives in the Town and Country Planning Act. They concluded;

In our view, the plain wording of section 5 is easy enough to understand without recourse to concepts like sustainable development that are not referred to, or the insistence that an anthropogenic reading of the section must necessarily involve weighing up everything against everything else.

== Resource consents ==
The RMA requires that certain uses of natural resources require a specific authorisation by a resource consent. As part of an application for resource consent, an Assessment of Environmental Effects (AEE), a report similar to Planning Statement, is required. This assessment, in theory, includes all potential impacts on the environment, including those that are only long-term, with 'sustainability' as a strong, though not yet clearly legally defined part of the Act.

== Climate change decisions ==
The RMA as originally enacted classified greenhouse gases as contaminants and it allowed consent authorities to consider the effects of global warming caused by discharges of greenhouse gases. In 1994, the Fourth National Government regarded the RMA as one of its policies to mitigate climate change. A number of decisions were made on that basis.

=== Stratford gas thermal power station ===
In 1993, the Electricity Corporation of New Zealand (ECNZ) proposed to build the Stratford Power Station, a 400-megawatt gas-fired thermal power station in Stratford, Taranaki. ECNZ applied for a resource consent to discharge contaminants including carbon dioxide to the atmosphere. The Environment Minister Simon Upton established a board of inquiry under the Resource Management Act to hear and advise him on the proposal.

In February 1995, the board of inquiry Report of the Board of Inquiry, Proposed Taranaki Power Station – Air Discharge Effects (February 1995) concluded that the power station's operation would significantly increase New Zealand's emissions of carbon dioxide and make it more difficult for the Government to meet its obligation to reduce the emission of greenhouse gases to their 1990 levels as committed to under the United Nations Framework Convention on Climate Change. The board of inquiry recommended that ECNZ must establish a carbon sink "sufficient to eventually store in perpetuity the equivalent quantity of carbon emitted from the site over the term of the permit".

In March 1995, Environment Minister Simon Upton in Decision of Hon Simon Upton, Minister for the Environment, Air Discharge Permit Taranaki Combined Cycle Power Station (Wellington, Ministry for the Environment, March 1995) accepted the bulk of the board's report and approved the resource consents. Upton made the conditions requiring carbon sequestration more flexible. The offsetting condition would only apply when electricity sector carbon dioxide emissions exceeded the volume emitted when the plant was commissioned. The offsetting condition allowed for either forests to create a carbon sink or greater efficiency elsewhere.

The decisions of the Minister and the board of inquiry set the precedent that under the RMA consent authorities can consider global warming to be a relevant effect and can impose conditions on companies that limit their discharges of greenhouse gases or require mitigation through offsetting or sequestration in forest sinks. The N.Z. Forestry periodical noted that planting forests to mitigate carbon dioxide emissions would be a temporary solution for about 40 years that did not take into account the emissions from the eventual harvesting stage. In 2001, Minister for the Environment Marian Hobbs informed Parliament that ECNZ had never planted any forest for sequestration of the Stratford Power Station emissions.

=== Otahuhu C gas thermal power station ===
In 2001, Contact Energy obtained resource consents for a new 400 MW gas-fired power plant at the existing Otahuhu Power Station site. In 2002, the Environmental Defence Society (EDS) appealed the consents to the Environment Court. In the decision Environmental Defence Society (Incorporated) v Auckland Regional Council and Contact Energy', the Environment Court agreed that the predicted annual emissions of 1.2 million tonnes of carbon dioxide would contribute to climate change via the greenhouse effect. The Environment Court agreed with the scientific consensus on anthropogenic climate change and concluded that the proposed CO_{2} emissions would be an "adverse effect of some consequence" under the RMA. However the court declined to grant the relief requested by EDS. That was to impose conditions requiring the complete offsetting of the carbon dioxide emissions by planting new forests. The court cited its concerns over its "efficacy, appropriateness and reasonableness" of the offsetting conditions.

== Opinions ==
The Act has regularly made headlines since its introduction, receiving the blame for the failure of a number of high-profile projects, such as the Project Aqua hydro dam.

Proponents of the RMA argue that it ensures the sustainable use of resources for the foreseeable needs of the present and future generation, and also recognises the importance of indigenous rights in the mitigation process. In this respect, the RMA is a pioneering act in the area of sustainable development. Other advantages cited are the umbrella function, which (at least in theory) allows all consent decisions about a project to be considered in one process, freeing applicants from the need to research and apply for all the various permits they would otherwise have to apply for their development. It is also noted that the RMA is 'effects-based'. In other words, instead of a proposal needing to be on a list of approved or permitted developments or activities, if the applicant can prove that the 'effects' of the development on the environment are unproblematic, then he or she is allowed to go ahead. In practice however, this proof is often elusive, especially with new or contested activities or developments.

=== Environment and conservation groups ===
New Zealand's largest conservation organisation, the Royal Forest and Bird Protection Society of New Zealand considers that;

- public participation is minimised as that 95% of all resource consents are granted without public notification,
- less than 1% of applications for consents are declined (MfE 1999–2000 survey),
- businesses equate public participation with added costs, but the OECD considers New Zealand to have low environmental compliance costs,
- consenting is an uneven playing field, as developers have better access to legal, planning, scientific experts than the public,
- the absence of national environmental standards and national policy statements has led to inconsistency between councils.

=== Business interests ===
Critics of the act argue that the resource management process is a barrier to investment, being unpredictable, expensive, protracted and often subject to undue influence from local lobby groups, especially the indigenous Māori iwi. A typical business viewpoint is expressed by the New Zealand Business Roundtable.

'The NZBR has long expressed concerns that are widely shared in the business community about the RMA. It is a cumbersome, time-consuming and costly piece of legislation that adds considerable uncertainty to business decision-making. It is a major impediment to the country's economic growth.'

The Business Round Table has also argued that the RMA contains core concepts, such as sustainable management, intrinsic values, Treaty principles, kaitiakitanga and the definition of the environment, which are 'hopelessly fuzzy'.

Companies have used it to hinder the operations of their competitors, even though the law specifically states that business competition is not to be a factor in decisions about giving consent.

Other business critics argue that the RMA is destructive of property rights.

Also especially criticised was the inability to restrict submissions against a project to those directly affected, and the need to go through a Council-level hearings phase even when it was already apparent that a case would eventually go to the Environment Court.

The RMA has also been blamed for preventing Project Aqua, a major hydroelectric scheme, by making compliance, respectively the compliance process, too costly.

=== Māori ===
New Zealand's indigenous Māori have in return argued that decisions made under the RMA do not adequately take into account the interests and values of New Zealand's indigenous people.

== 2007 assessment of RMA's performance ==
Rod Oram's paper 'The RMA now and in the future', presented at the 2007 Beyond the RMA conference assessed the RMA's performance over its first 16 years. The paper's main conclusions were the following:

- 'The effectiveness of the RMA is patchy. In rural areas it can cope with allocation and management of relatively abundant resources. But it cannot cope when resources, particularly water, are fully allocated. Nor can it cope with cumulative effects.... Under the RMA it is not easy for councils to declare a halt to further consents. And in urban areas, the RMA works well for small, local consents. But it is inadequate for dealing with wide area, long-term and strategic issues of urban development.'
- 'The efficiency of the RMA has increased.... And there may be more gains to come from the 2005 amendments, which put in place mechanisms to upskill council staff and for councils to share knowledge. But some 20 councils were still considered to be under-performing.... And there are still complaints by consent applicants about variable quality of staff, decisions and timeliness. The continuing lack of national policy statements and environmental standards are widely considered detrimental to the Act's administration.'
- 'The future of the RMA is highly uncertain. Almost all the development effort that has gone into it has focused on improving process rather than refining purpose. Thus, administration of the Act might have become more efficient but the legislation has failed to respond to greater pressures on the environment...or greater demands from the public for higher standards and more certain sustainability'.

== 2008 RMA reform ==
The National Party, when in opposition to the government, made a promise to reform the RMA during the 2008 election campaign. After winning the election a reform group was announced. They were given the following terms of reference:

- raising New Zealand's rate of productivity and economic growth
- increasing the flexibility of the economy to facilitate adjustment and promote confidence and investment in response to the international economic crisis
- providing for sound environmental policies and practices.

In February 2009 the National-led Government announced the "Resource Management (Simplify and Streamline) Amendment Bill 2009" aimed at:

1. Removing frivolous, vexatious and anti-competitive objections
2. Streamlining processes for projects of national significance
3. Creating an Environmental Protection Authority
4. Improving plan development and plan change processes
5. Improving resource consent processes
6. Streamlining decision making
7. Improving workability and compliance

Local Government New Zealand said in its submission to the local government and environment select committee that some of the changes designed to simplify and streamline the Resource Management Act were not well thought out and may actually create more delays and increase costs.

ECO considered that the Bill will hinder the input from communities and to favour large projects. It would also fast-track large developments and make little difference to smaller projects, a similar situation to the controversial National Development Act (repealed in 1986).

In 2013, Parliamentary Commissioner for the Environment Jan Wright criticised planned amendments to the Act, saying it "is not, and should not become, an economic development act".

== Fast-tracking projects in COVID-19 recovery plan ==
As part of planning for economic recovery following the COVID-19 pandemic, the Minister for the Environment announced on 3 May 2020 that the Government would amend the law to allow fast-tracking of selected projects through the RMA. The resource consent applications for the selected projects will be processed by an expert consenting panel chaired by a current or retired Environmental Court judge or senior lawyer. Each panel will have a person nominated by the relevant local councils and a person nominated by the relevant iwi authorities. Consenting panels will issue decisions within 25 working days after receiving comments on the application, although this could be increased to 50 days for large-scale projects. Existing Treaty of Waitangi settlements will be upheld, as will sustainable management and existing RMA national directions. Appeal rights will be limited to points of law and/or judicial review to the High Court, with one further right of appeal to the Court of Appeal.

The announcement was welcomed by the industry body Infrastructure New Zealand. On 4 May, the chief executive said that "the RMA has become a litigious, cumbersome, and complex piece of legislation. It was never intended to be applied the way it has been, and it was not designed to facilitate recovery from something like the COVID-19 lockdown".

The chief executive of the New Zealand Infrastructure Commission, responsible for national oversight of infrastructure planning and investment, called for wide-ranging improvements to environmental planning, including more focus on long-term needs, more integrated decision making and institutional reform.

== Replacement efforts ==
=== Sixth Labour government, 2020–2023 ===
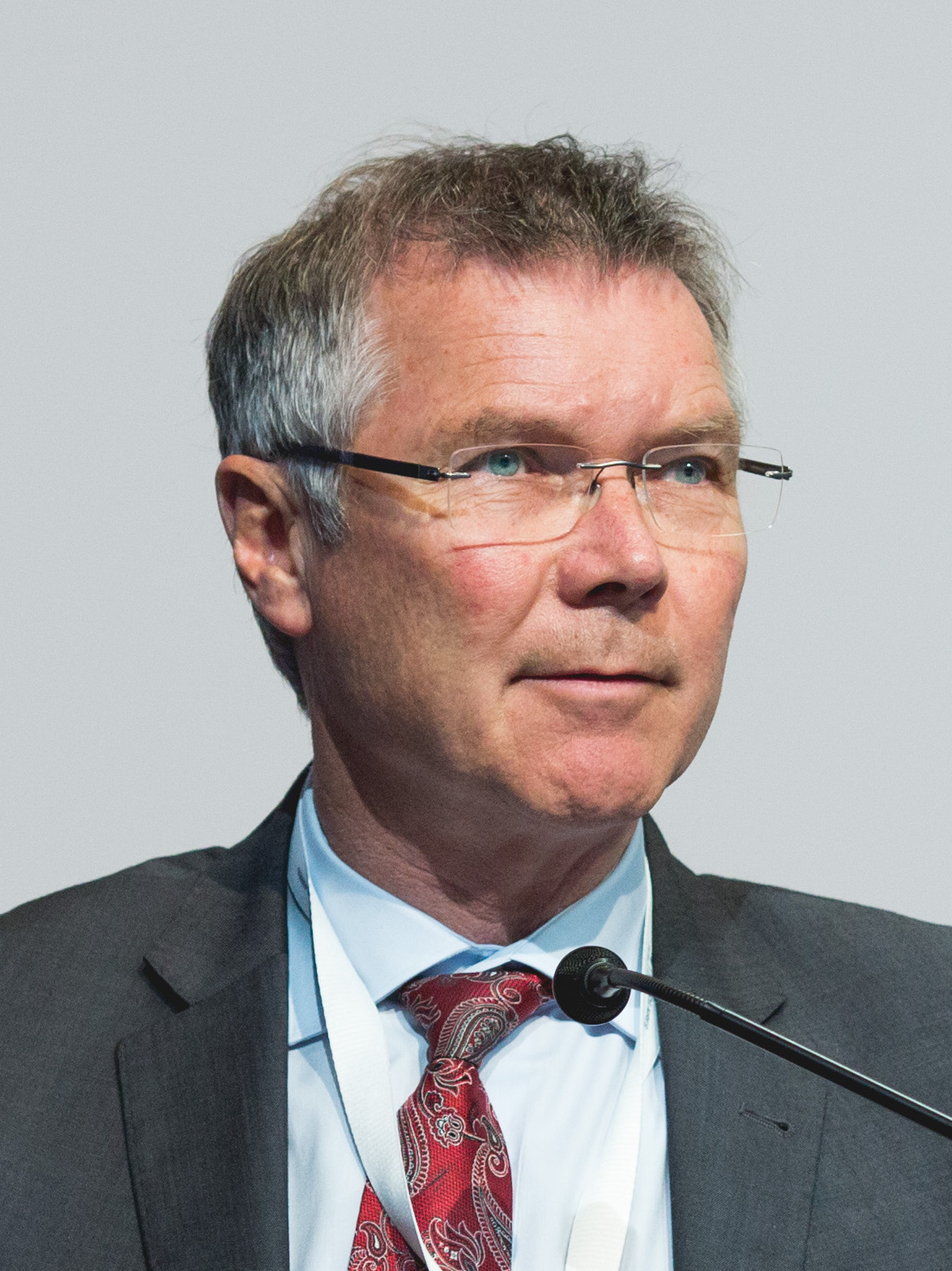
David Parker as Minister for the Environment introduced legislation intended to replace the Resource Management Act.

In 2020 a comprehensive independent review of New Zealand's resource management system was undertaken. This report was named the 'Randerson report', after the Court of Appeal Judge, Hon Tony Randerson, who led the review. The review identified issues with the current system, and concluded that the system cannot cope with current pressures. These pressures included high population growth and the lack of accommodating development, diminishing biodiversity, the degradation of nature, and the need to mitigate and adapt to climate change. The report also made several recommendations including repealing and replacing the RMA.

On 10 February 2021, the Sixth Labour Government confirmed that the Resource Management Act would be replaced by three separate new laws based on the Randerson Report's recommendations. The three new acts were the Natural and Built Environment Act 2023 (NBA), the Spatial Planning Act 2023 (SPA), and the Climate Change Adaptation Bill (CAA). The acts were to be drafted, notified and implemented over the next three years.

In June 2021, the Government released an 'exposure draft' of the Natural and Built Environment Bill, to enable two rounds of public consultation.

In mid November 2022, the Government introduced the NBA and the SPA as part of its first steps to replace the Resource Management Act. The NBA established a National Planning Framework (NPF) setting out rules for land use and regional resource allocation. The NPF also replaced the Government's policy statements on water, air quality and other issues with an umbrella framework. Under the framework of the NPF, all 15 regions would be required to develop a Natural and Built Environment Plan (NBE) that would replace the 100 district and regional plans, harmonising consenting and planning rules. An independent national Māori entity would also be established to provide input into the NPF and ensure compliance with the Treaty of Waitangi's provisions. The Spatial Planning Bill would deal with long-term planning. Local committees would be required to develop 30-year regional spatial strategies (RSS). These strategies would be informed by the NPF and would help the regions decide their NBEs. In response, the opposition National and ACT parties criticised the two replacement bills on the grounds that they created more centralisation, bureaucracy, and did little to reform the problems associated with the RMA process. The Green Party expressed concerns about the perceived lack of environment protections in the two bills.

The Natural and Built Environment and Spatial Planning Acts passed their third readings on 15 August 2023, and received royal assent on 23 August.

=== Sixth National Government, 2023–present ===
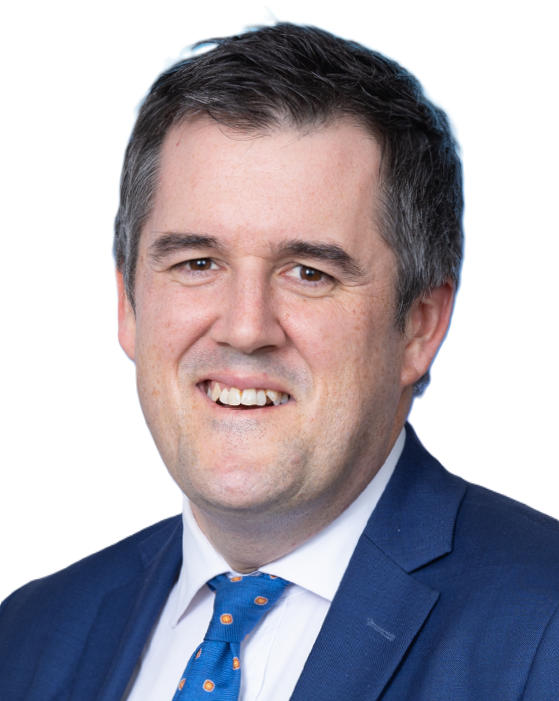
Chris Bishop, Minister for RMA reform under the National-led coalition government.

Following the 2023 New Zealand general election, the NBA and SPA laws were repealed by the National-led coalition government, which passed the Resource Management (Natural and Built Environment and Spatial Planning Repeal and Interim Fast-track Consenting) Act 2023 on 19 December 2023.

On 23 April 2024, the RMA Reform Minister Chris Bishop announced that the Government's RMA replacement legislation would remove intensive winter grazing regulations, low-slope map from stock exclusion regulations, suspend the requirement for local councils to identify new Significant Natural Areas for three years, eliminate the requirement for resource consents to comply with the "Te Mana o te Wai hierarchy of obligations," and ease coal mining restrictions. The Resource Management (Freshwater and Other Matters) Amendment Bill was introduced on 23 May 2024.

On 20 September 2024, Bishop announced that the Government would introduce two new laws to replace the Resource Management Act 1991. One law would focus on managing the environmental effects of development activities while the second would enable urban development and infrastructure. On 23 October, the Government passed the Resource Management (Freshwater and Other Matters) Amendment Act 2024, which seeks to ease the "regulatory burden" on the country's farming, mining and other primary industries.

On 24 March 2025, Bishop and Simon Court announced details about the new legislative framework that would replace the RMA system. This included a new Planning Act focusing on land use and development and a Natural Environment Act focusing on the use, protection and enhancement of the natural environment. The new RMA-replacement system would focus on the economic concept of externalities and property rights while ensuring environmental protections and safeguards.

On 18 June 2025, Bishop announced that the Government would be amending resource management legislation to allow it to override local councils if their decisions "negatively" impacted economic growth, development and employment. He also confirmed that the Government would retain the "Medium Density Residential Standards" introduced by the previous Labour Government, abandoning earlier plans by the National-led government to make them optional. In late June 2025, both Regional Development Minister Shane Jones and Prime Minister Christopher Luxon expressed support for abolishing regional councils, opining that they did not see any need for these local government bodies after the coalition government passes its RMA replacement legislation.

On 25 November 2025, Local Government Minister Simon Watts and RMA Reform Minister Bishop confirmed that the Government would introduce legislation in 2026 to abolish regional councils and transfer their responsibilities to the 67 territorial authorities. The Government has released two replacement proposals. First, abolishing elected regional councillors and replacing them with Combined Territories Boards (CTBs). These CTBs would consist of the mayors of the district councils within the former regions. While the regional councils as organisations would remain, they would be run by the mayors of the constituent regions. The Government's second proposal would be to get the Combined Territories Boards to prepare a regional reorganisation plan within two years of their establishment, subject to approval by the Local Government Minister. These plans would focus on the delivery of infrastructure, public services and regulatory functions, and would be tested against criteria based on housing, infrastructure, and manageable rates services.

On 9 December 2025, Bishop announced that the Government would introduce two new bills to replace the RMA Act in 2026, with the goal of passing them into law in late 2026. These proposed laws consist of a Planning Bill outlining how land can be used and developed including for housing growth and a Natural Environment Bill outlining the rules for managing the usage of natural resources and environmental protection. These two laws are expected to come into effect in 2029. Key policies have included reducing the over 100 policy statements and plans to 17 Regional Combined plans, requiring local councils to compensate property owners when their property rights are affected by regulation, creating a new framework of "national instruments" that would include iwi input and environmental safeguards, and standardising zoning rules. On 16 December, the Planning and Natural Environment Bills passed their first readings and were referred to the Environment select committee. Labour joined the National, ACT and NZ First parties in supporting its passage to the select committee level, while the Green and Māori parties opposed the proposed bills.

On 20 July 2026, Luxon and Bishop announced that the Government would scrap the Mana Whakahono ā Rohe agreements between local councils and Māori iwi as part of its RMA reforms. Bishop said that these agreements would be replaced with "new narrowly scoped iwi participation agreements." At the time, local councils were engaged in 20 council-iwi agreements with iwi groups. The announcement coincided with the select committee releasing its reports on the Planning and Natural Environment Bills. Federated Farmers and the New Zealand Taxpayers' Union had lobbied against these council-iwi agreements. In response, the opposition Labour, Green and Māori parties criticised the proposed replacement laws for their regulatory relief provisions for landlords, the weakening of environmental regulations and for benefiting private property and extraction interests. Labour leader Chris Hipkins expressed concern that the scrapping of council-iwi agreements would lead to the "relitigating" of existing Treaty of Waitangi settlements. Ngāti Hine chair Rowena Tana and Northland Regional Council chair Pita Tipene said that scrapping the council-iwi agreements would hurt relations between local governments and iwi groups.

On 4 August 2026, the amended Natural Environment and Planning Bills passed their second reading along party lines. On 22 September 2026, the Natural Environment and Planning Bills passed their third readings, becoming law. While National, ACT and NZ First supported the bills, they were opposed by the Labour, Green and Māori parties.

== See also ==
- District Plan, the main planning instrument of the RMA at District Council level
- Environment Court, the court dealing with Resource Management Act matters
- Environment of New Zealand
- New Zealand Coastal Policy Statement
