= Simon Court =

New Zealand ACT Party politician

Simon Court MP
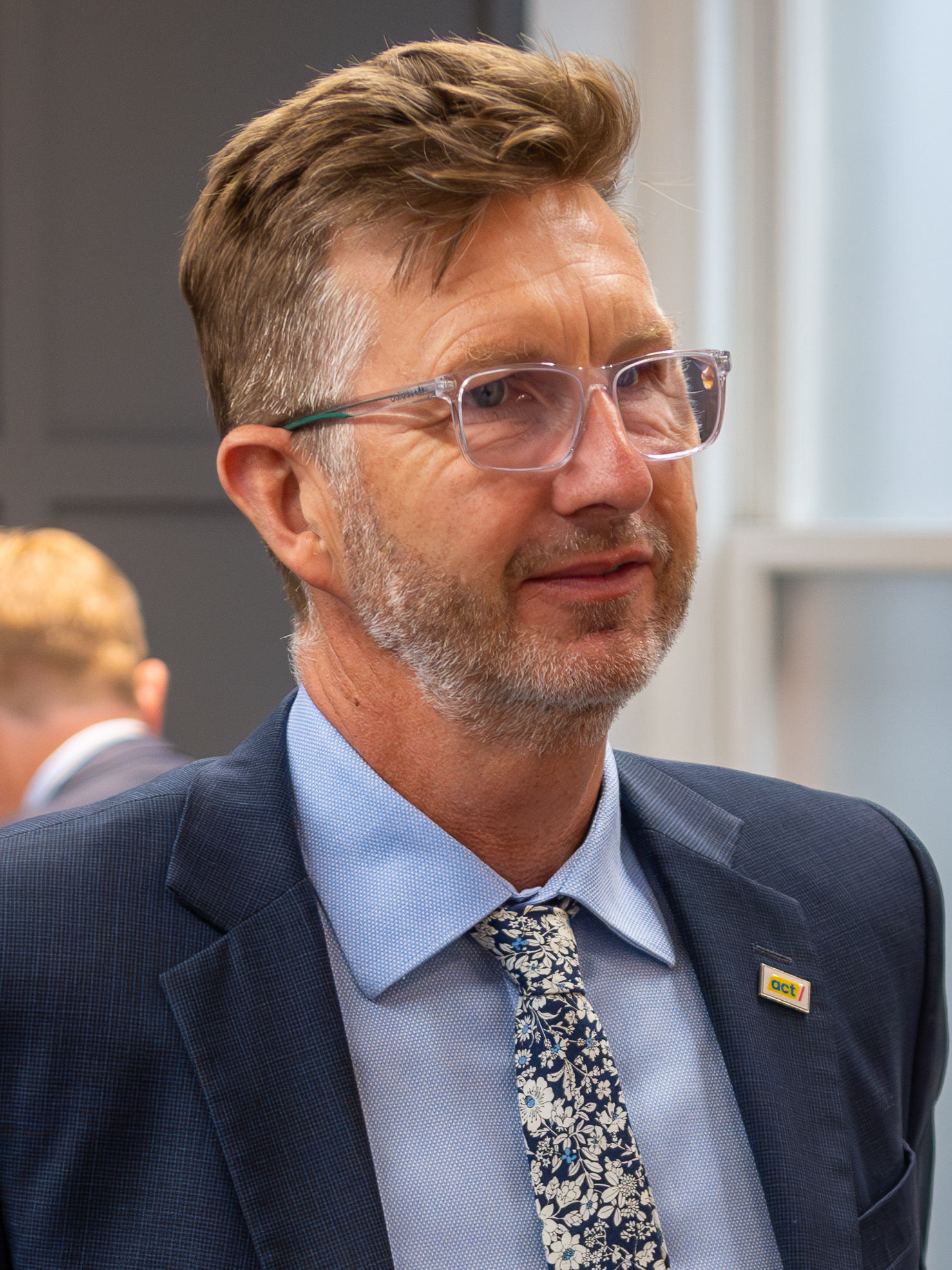
- Court in 2025

Member of the New Zealand Parliament for ACT party list
- Incumbent
- Assumed office 17 October 2020

Personal details
- Party: ACT

Simon Thomas Court is a New Zealand politician. He has been a Member of Parliament for ACT New Zealand since the 2020 general election.

== Early life and career ==
Court went to Auckland Grammar School and then attended Unitec to study civil engineering. At age 17, he was shot in the foot; Court said that this was after a cannabis deal his friend made went badly.

Court has public and private sector experience and worked in Auckland, Wellington and Fiji. For Auckland City Council, he worked as a civil and environmental engineer, and before entering parliament, he was running his own engineering firm.

In 2016 and 2017, Court worked for engineering consultancy MWH Global in Fiji. The consultancy lost its contract with the Fiji Roads Authority on alleged pay disputes, and Court and one other employee were deported from Fiji. According to Court, the deportation was in response to him speaking out about Chinese Communist Party contractors' workmanship. Fiji Roads Authority reportedly "accused MWH of extortion, breaking contract, and damaging the country", but Court disputed this, saying he did not see any evidence of that.

== Political career ==
New Zealand Parliament
Years	Term	Electorate	List	Party
2020–2023	53rd	List	5	ACT
2023–2026	54th	List	8	ACT
2026–present	55th	List	8	ACT

=== First term, 2020–2023 ===
Court stated in 2020 that he had supported the ACT Party for just over two decades, but also that he had voted Green twice. He joined ACT after going to a party event in December 2019.

In the 2020 general election, Court was placed 5th on the ACT party list and ran for the electorate of Te Atatū. He did not win the electorate, coming fourth with 1610 votes, but ACT won 7.6% of the party vote, which entitled it to 10 MPs, including Court. In his first term, he was ACT's spokesperson for the environment, climate change, infrastructure, transport, local government, and energy and resources. He was also a member of the Environment Committee.

On 20 June 2023, Court was referred to Parliament's Privileges Committee after he disclosed the Environment Committee's vote relating to the Natural and Built Environment Act 2023. On 26 July, the Privileges Committee found that Court had committed a "clear breach" of select committee confidentiality. Court apologised for his action and the committee recommended that no further action be taken against him.

=== Second term, 2023–2026 ===
Court contested Te Atatū for a second time at the 2023 general election. He was unsuccessful, but retained his position as an ACT party list MP.

Following the formation of the National-led coalition government in late November 2023, Court assumed the position of Parliamentary Under-Secretary for the Minister for Infrastructure and RMA reform.

On 24 March 2025, Court and RMA reform minister Chris Bishop announced that the Government would replace the Resource Management Act 1991 with two new laws: a Planning Act focusing on land use and development and a Natural Environment Act focusing on the use, protection and enhancement of the natural environment. The two bills passed their first reading on 16 December 2025 and were referred to the New Zealand Parliament's environment select committee. On 22 September 2026, the Planning and Natural Environment Acts passed their third readings.

=== Third term, 2026–present ===
During the 2026 New Zealand general election, Court was ranked eighth place on the ACT party list and contested the Kaipara ki Mahurangi electorate. On 7 November, Court came third place with 2,856 votes based on preliminary results. He was re-elected to Parliament on the ACT party list.

== Views and positions ==
Simon Court has expressed support for Israel, stating that "the Jewish people who deserve a place to call home." He supported Israel during the Gaza war and has called on New Zealand to condemn Iran and its proxies. Court believes that New Zealand shares much in common with Israel. In September 2025, Court published a social media post describing pro-Palestinian protesters in Auckland as wearing "terro [sic] dress" and being motivated by antisemitism. Green Party co-leader Marama Davidson criticised Court and the National-led government for failing to act against the Gaza genocide. In response, ACT leader David Seymour defended Court on free speech grounds. Court responded to criticism by accusing Hamas of seeking to divide the West and New Zealand.

== Personal life ==
Court has three teenage sons, the youngest of whom has Down syndrome. He cites his youngest son as one of the main reasons for entering Parliament.
