= National Policy Statement (New Zealand) =

National policy statements are prepared by the New Zealand Government as outlined in the Resource Management Act 1991 (RMA), an Act of Parliament to promote the sustainable management of New Zealand's natural and physical resources.

National policy statements are covered by sections 45 to 55 of the RMA.

Lack of national policy statements has often been given as one of the drawbacks of the ability of the RMA to afford protection of the environment.

As of July 2024, eight national policy statements are in force:

- New Zealand Coastal Policy Statement 2010;
- National Policy Statement on Freshwater Management 2020;
- National Policy Statement on Urban Development 2020;
- National Policy Statement on Renewable Electricity Generation 2011;
- National Policy Statement on Electricity Transmission 2008;
- National Policy Statement for Highly Productive Land 2022;
- National Policy Statement for Indigenous Biodiversity 2023; and
- National Policy Statement for Greenhouse Gas Emissions from Industrial Process 2023.

== See also ==
- Resource consent
- Environment of New Zealand
