= District Plan =

A district plan is a statutory planning document of New Zealand's territorial authorities.

Mainly covering land use/zoning questions, they have been required since the advent of the Resource Management Act 1991. They are updated periodically, though major revisions and plan changes are usually not produced very often, partly due to the large-scale legal battles that often follow proposed changes.
