= New Zealand emissions reduction plan =

New Zealand plan for reducing greenhouse gas emissions

The first New Zealand emissions reduction plan (ERP) was published in 2022. Its purpose is to set out how New Zealand will meet its climate goals. The ERP was amended in 2024, and then a second ERP covering 2026–2030 was published. The second plan was again amended in January 2026, to change how agricultural emissions were intended to be dealt with.

== Purpose ==
The ERP sets out how the government intends to meet its climate goals, which include commitments made in the Paris Agreement, as well as domestic climate goals.

== First emissions reduction plan ==
The first ERP was published by the Ministry for the Environment (now subsumed into the Ministry for Cities, Environment, Regions and Transport) in 2022.

== Second emissions reduction plan ==
The second ERP was published in December 2024 by Climate Change Minister Simon Watts, and amended in 2026. It covers the period from 2024 to 2030.

== Reception ==
In 2026 the Climate Change Commission warned that New Zealand would likely fail to meet all its climate targets, as a result of failing to provide incentives for farmers to reduce agricultural emissions. A legal challenge to the ERP was filed by the Environmental Law Initiative and Climate Action NZ, who claim the plan relied too much on tree-planting at the expense of reductions in emissions. They also estimate that 35 policies described in the first ERP were removed in an unlawful, "incoherent and internally contradictory" process. The Parliamentary Commissioner for the Environment, Simon Upton, criticised the plan as containing 'heroic' methane projections. Upton said the plan was based on uptake of a vaccine for more than a third of dairy cattle, with a vaccine that was still at the proof-of-concept stage, and despite the removal of incentives for farmers to use the vaccine.
