= Minister for Infrastructure (New Zealand) =

New Zealand minister of the Crown

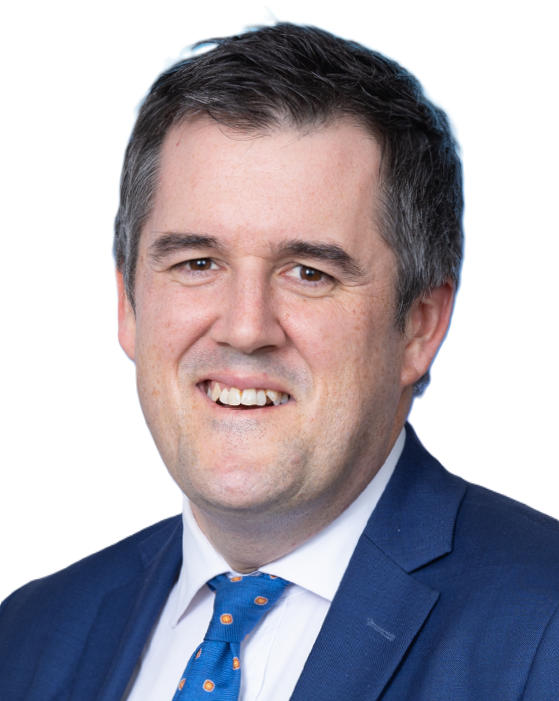
- Incumbent; Chris Bishop since 27 November 2023
- Member of: Cabinet of New Zealand; Executive Council
- Reports to: Prime Minister of New Zealand
- Appointer: Governor-General of New Zealand
- Term length: At His Majesty's pleasure
- Formation: 19 November 2008
- First holder: Bill English

The Minister for Infrastructure is a ministerial post created in November 2008 by the New Zealand Government, in accordance with the National party's pre-election policy.

== Conception ==
National leader Don Brash announced his intention to create the office on 18 August 2005 in the campaign for the 2005 New Zealand general election. He cited the rewriting of the Resource Management Act 1991–which he described as a "major impediment" to fast decisions– as a major task for the future minister, who would also work with ministers in the areas of transport, energy, communications, building and the environment. The creation of the portfolio was one of the National Party's election pledges for the 2005 general election.

== History ==
The Minister of Infrastructure post was tipped by some media for Steven Joyce but was given to Bill English, who held the position for the first term of the Fifth National Government of New Zealand, and was sworn in on 19 November 2008. Joyce was appointed Associate Minister. The portfolio was absorbed into the Minister of Finance portfolio on 14 December 2011 as Key formed his Cabinet after the 2011 New Zealand general election.

The position was re-created on 20 December 2016, when Prime Minister Bill English named his Cabinet on 18 December 2016. Steven Joyce was named to the post, as well as Minister of Finance.

== List of ministers ==
Key

National NZ First Labour

No.	Name	Portrait	Term of office		Prime Minister
1	Bill English		19 November 2008	14 December 2011	Key
Absorbed into the Minister of Finance portfolio
2	Steven Joyce		20 December 2016	26 October 2017	English
3	Shane Jones		26 October 2017	6 November 2020	Ardern
4	Grant Robertson		6 November 2020	1 February 2023	Ardern
4	Grant Robertson		6 November 2020	1 February 2023	Hipkins
5	Megan Woods		1 February 2023	27 November 2023	Hipkins
6	Chris Bishop		27 November 2023	present	Luxon
