= Minister for the Environment (New Zealand) =

New Zealand minister of the Crown

- Coat of arms of New Zealand

- Flag of New Zealand

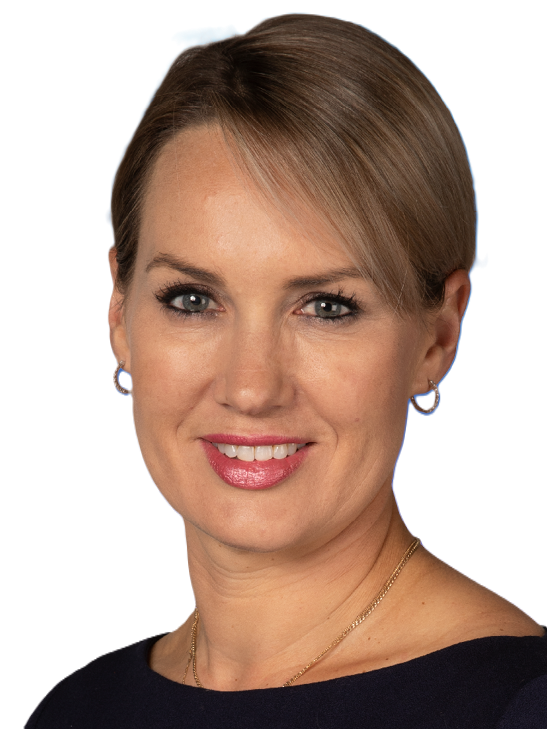
- Incumbent; Nicola Grigg since 7 April 2025
- Ministry for the Environment
- Style: The Honourable
- Member of: Cabinet of New Zealand; Executive Council
- Reports to: Prime Minister of New Zealand
- Appointer: Governor-General of New Zealand
- Term length: At His Majesty's pleasure
- Formation: 9 February 1972
- First holder: Duncan MacIntyre
- Salary: $288,900
- Website: www.beehive.govt.nz

The Minister for the Environment is a minister in the New Zealand Government with responsibility for the natural environment and the planning system, and is in charge of the Ministry for the Environment.

The present Minister is Nicola Grigg, a member of the National Party.

== Responsibilities ==
The Minister's responsibilities include the use and protection of the environment, including the management of risks.

Legislation the Minister is responsible for includes:

- Environment Act 1986
- Resource Management Act 1991
- Hazardous Substances and New Organisms Act 1996
- Waste Minimisation Act 2008.

== List of ministers for the environment ==
Key

National Labour

No.	Name	Portrait	Term of office		Prime Minister
1	Duncan MacIntyre		9 February 1972	8 December 1972	Marshall
2	Joe Walding		8 December 1972	10 September 1974	Kirk
3	Whetu Tirikatene-Sullivan		10 September 1974	12 December 1975	Rowling
4	Venn Young		12 December 1975	12 February 1981	Muldoon
5	Ian Shearer		12 February 1981	26 July 1984	Muldoon
6	Russell Marshall		26 July 1984	17 February 1986	Lange
7	Phil Goff		17 February 1986	24 August 1987	Lange
8	Geoffrey Palmer		24 August 1987	2 November 1990	Lange
8	Geoffrey Palmer		24 August 1987	2 November 1990	Palmer
8	Geoffrey Palmer		24 August 1987	2 November 1990	Moore
9	Simon Upton		2 November 1990	3 October 1991	Bolger
10	Rob Storey		3 October 1991	29 November 1993	Bolger
(9)	Simon Upton		29 November 1993	10 December 1999	Bolger
(9)	Simon Upton		29 November 1993	10 December 1999	Shipley
11	Marian Hobbs		10 December 1999	19 October 2005	Clark
12	David Benson-Pope		19 October 2005	27 July 2007	Clark
–	David Parker (acting)		27 July 2007	31 October 2007	Clark
13	Trevor Mallard		31 October 2007	19 November 2008	Clark
14	Nick Smith		19 November 2008	21 March 2012	Key
–	Chris Finlayson (acting)		21 March 2012	2 April 2012	Key
15	Amy Adams		3 April 2012	6 October 2014	Key
(14)	Nick Smith		8 October 2014	26 October 2017	Key
(14)	Nick Smith		8 October 2014	26 October 2017	English
16	David Parker		26 October 2017	27 November 2023	Ardern
16	David Parker		26 October 2017	27 November 2023	Hipkins
17	Penny Simmonds		27 November 2023	7 April 2026	Luxon
18	Nicola Grigg		7 April 2026	Present	Luxon
