= New Zealand Coastal Policy Statement =

The first New Zealand Coastal Policy Statement (NZCPS) was released in 1994 and replaced in 2010. The NZCPS is a requirement under Section 56 of the Resource Management Act 1991.

== See also ==
- Environment of New Zealand
