= Natural and Built Environment Act 2023 =

Repealed Act of Parliament in New Zealand

New Zealand Parliament
- Royal assent: 23 August 2023
- Repealed: 23 December 2023

Legislative history
- Introduced by: David Parker
- First reading: 22 November 2022
- Second reading: 18 July 2023
- Third reading: 15 August 2023

Related legislation
- Resource Management Act 1991
- Status: Repealed

The Natural and Built Environment Act 2023 (NBA), now repealed, was one of the three laws intended to replace New Zealand's Resource Management Act 1991 (RMA). The NBA aimed to promote the protection and enhancement of the natural and built environment, while providing for housing and preparing for the effects of climate change.

An exposure draft of the bill was released in June 2021 to allow for public submissions. The bill passed its third reading on 15 August 2023, and received royal assent on 23 August 2023. On 23 December 2023, the NBA and the Spatial Planning Act 2023 (SPA) were both repealed by the National-led coalition government.

== Exposure draft ==
The Natural and Built Environment Bill exposure draft features many contrasts to its RMA predecessor. This includes the ability to set environmental limits, the goal to reduce greenhouse gas emissions, the provisions to increase housing supply, and the ability for planners to access activities based on outcomes. A notable difference is the bill's stronger attention to Māori involvement in decision making and Māori environmental issues. Greater emphasis is put on upholding the nation's founding document, the Treaty of Waitangi.

Under the bill, over 100 plans and policy statements will be replaced by just 14 plans. These plans will be prepared by new Regional Council Planning Committees and their planning secretariats. The planning committee will be composed of one person to represent the Minister of Conservation, appointed representatives of mana whenua, and elected people from each district within the region. The committee will have an array of responsibilities, including the ability to vote on plan changes, set environmental limits for the region, and consider recommendations from hearings. The planning secretariat would draft the plans and provide expert advice.

== Provisions ==
In mid November 2022, the Natural and Built Environment Act was introduced into parliament. In its initial version, the bill establishes a National Planning Framework (NPF) setting out rules for land use and regional resource allocation. The NPF also replaces the Government's policy statements on water, air quality and other issues with an umbrella framework. Under NPF's framework, all 15 regions will be required to develop a Natural and Built Environment Plan (NBE) that will replace the 100 district and regional plans, harmonising consenting and planning rules. An independent national Māori entity will also be established to provide input into the NPF and ensure compliance with the Treaty of Waitangi's provisions.

Key provisions have included:

- Every person has a responsibility to protect and sustain the health and well-being of the natural environment for the benefit of all New Zealanders.
- Every person has a duty to avoid, minimise, remedy, offset, or provide redress for adverse effects including "unreasonable noise."
- Prescribes restrictions relating to land, coastal marine area, river and lake beds, water, and discharges.
- Establishes a national planning framework (NPF) to provide directions on integrated environmental management, resolve conflicts on environmental matters, and to set environmental limits and strategic directions. This framework will take the form of regulations, which will be considered secondary legislation.
- Sets Te Ture Whaimana as the primary direction-setting document for the Waikato and Waipā rivers and activities within their catchments affecting the rivers.
- Resource allocation are guided by the principles of sustainability, efficiency, and equity.
- Prescribes the criteria for setting environmental limits, human health limits, exemptions, targets, and management units.
- Outlines the process for submitting and appealing case to the Environment Court.
- Outlines the resource consent process.

== History ==
=== Background ===
A 2020 review of the Resource Management Act 1991 (RMA) found various problems with the existing resource management system, and concluded that it could not cope with modern environmental pressures. In January 2021, the government announced that the RMA will be replaced by three acts, with the Natural and Built Environment Bill being the primary of the three.

An exposure draft of the NBA was released in late June 2021.

=== Introduction ===
On 14 November 2022, the Sixth Labour Government of New Zealand introduced the Natural and Built Environment Bill into parliament alongside the companion Spatial Planning Act 2023 (SPA) as part of its efforts to replace the Resource Management Act. In response, the opposition National and ACT parties criticised the two replacement bills on the grounds that it created more centralisation, bureaucracy, and did little to reform the problems associated with the RMA process. The Green Party expressed concerns about the perceived lack of environment protection in the proposed legislation.

A third bill, the Climate Adaptation Bill (CAA), was expected to be introduced in 2023 with the goal of passing it into law in 2024. The CAA would have established the systems and mechanisms for protecting communities against the effects of climate change such as managed retreat in response to rising levels. The Climate Adaptation Bill also would have dealt with funding the costs of managing climate change.

=== First reading ===
The Natural and Built Environment Bill passed its first reading in the New Zealand House of Representatives on 22 November 2022 by a margin of 74 to 45 votes. The governing Labour and allied Green parties supported the bill while the opposition National, ACT, and Māori parties voted against the bill. The bill's sponsor David Parker and other Labour Members of Parliament including Associate Environment Minister Phil Twyford, Rachel Brooking, and Green MP Eugenie Sage advocated revamping the resource management system due to the unwieldy nature of the Resource Management Act. National MPs Scott Simpson, Chris Bishop, Sam Uffindell, and ACT MP Simon Court argued that the NBA would do little to improve the resource management system and address the centralisation of power and decision-making regarding resource management. Māori Party co-leader Debbie Ngarewa-Packer argued that the bill was insufficient in advancing co-governance and expressed concern that a proposed national Māori entity would undermine the power of Māori iwi (tribes) and hapū (sub-groups). The bill was subsequently referred to the Environment Select Committee.

=== Select committee ===
On 27 June 2023, the Environment select committee presented its final report on the Natural Built and Environment Bill. The committee made several recommendations including:

- Inserting clauses to emphasise the protection of the health of the natural environment and intergenerational well being.
- Inserting a new Clause 3A to outline the key aims of the legislation.
- Clarifying clauses around geoheritage sites, greenhouse gas emissions, coastal marine areas, fishing, land supply, customary rights, cultural heritage, and public access.
- Defining other natural environment aspects: air, soil, and estuaries.
- Allowing the National Planning Framework (NPF) to set management units for freshwater and air and provide direction on them.
- Amending Clause 58 to ease restrictions on non-commercial housing on Māori land.
- Adding directions on protecting urban trees and the supply of fresh fruits and vegetables to the NPF.

A majority of Environment committee members voted to pass the amendments.

The National, ACT and Green parties released minority submissions on the bill. While supporting a revamp of the Resource Management Act, the National Party argued that the NBA failed to address the problems with the RMA framework, and criticised the NBA as complex, bureaucratic, detrimental to local democracy and property rights. Similarly, the ACT party criticised the legislation as complex, confusing, and claimed it would discourage development. Meanwhile, the Green Party opined that the NBA was insufficient in protecting the environment and reducing environmental degradation.

=== Second reading ===
The NBA passed its second reading on 18 July 2023 by a margin of 72 to 47 votes. While it was supported by the Labour, Green parties, and former Green Member of Parliament Elizabeth Kerekere, it was opposed by the National, ACT, Māori parties, and former Labour MP Meka Whaitiri. The House of Representatives also voted to accept the Environment select committee's recommendations. Labour MPs Parker, Brooking, Twyford, Angie Warren-Clark, Neru Leavasa, and Stuart Nash, and Green MP Sage gave speeches defending the bill while National MPs Chris Bishop, Scott Simpson, Barbara Kuriger, Tama Potaka, and ACT MP Simon Court criticised the bill in their speeches.

=== Third reading ===
The NBA passed its third reading on 15 August 2023 by margin of 72 to 47 votes. The Labour, Green parties, and Kerekere supported the bill while the National, ACT, Māori parties, and Whaitiri opposed it. Labour MPs Parker, Brooking, Twyford, Warren-Clark, Angela Roberts, Arena Williams, and Lydia Sosene and Green MP Sage defended the bill while National MPs Bishop, Kuriger, and Simpson opposed the bill.

=== Repeal ===
On 23 December, the National-led coalition government repealed the Natural and Built Environment Act and Spatial Planning Act 2023. RMA Reform Minister Chris Bishop announced that New Zealand would revert to the Resource Management Act 1991 while the Government developed replacement legislation.
