= Environment Act 1986 =

Act of Parliament in New Zealand

New Zealand Parliament
- Long title: An Act to (a) Provide for the establishment of the office of Parliamentary Commissioner for the Environment: (b) Provide for the establishment of the Ministry for the Environment: (c) Ensure that, in the management of natural and physical resources, full and balanced account is taken of (i) The intrinsic values of ecosystems; and (ii) All values which are placed by individuals and groups on the quality of the environment; and (iii) The principles of the Treaty of Waitangi; and (iv) The sustainability of natural and physical resources; and (v) The needs of future generations
- Commenced: 1 January 1987
- Status: Current legislation

The Environment Act 1986 of New Zealand established the Ministry for the Environment and the Office of the Parliamentary Commissioner for the Environment.
