= Environmental Protection Authority (New Zealand) =

New Zealand crown agency

- Te Mana Rauhī Taiao (Māori)

Agency overview
- Formed: 1 July 2011
- Jurisdiction: New Zealand
- Headquarters: Wellington, New Zealand
- Minister responsible: Hon Nicola Grigg
- Agency executives: Dr. Allan Freeth, Chief Executive; Julie Hardaker, Chair of the Board
- Website: www.epa.govt.nz

The Environmental Protection Authority (EPA; Māori: Te Mana Rauhī Taiao) is a New Zealand government agency (Crown entity/agent). It is New Zealand's national-level environmental regulator. Its vision is "an environment protected, enhancing our way of life and the economy."

As a Crown agent under the Crown entity model, the EPA operates at arm’s length from ministers. Its independence in decision making is protected by statute and the established governance structures. A letter of expectations is issued annually by its responsible ministers which, within the context of its independence, sets out the broad expectations of the Government of the day.

== History ==
The Environmental Protection Authority was established on 1 July 2011 under its own Act, the Environmental Protection Authority Act 2011. The Act requires the EPA to carry out its functions in a way that:

- contributes to the effective and transparent management of New Zealand's environment and natural and physical resources
- enables New Zealand to meet its international obligations.

As part of its establishment, the EPA took over the functions of the Environmental Risk Management Authority, which was disestablished in 2011. The EPA name had been in use since 2009, when it applied to a unit of the Ministry for the Environment responsible for administering a section of the Resource Management Act relating to proposals of national significance.

Its head office is based in Wellington and it employs approximately 170 permanent staff.

== Legislation ==
The EPA is responsible for a range of environmental functions that have a national focus and reach. Specific functions are specified in six environmental Acts:

- Resource Management Act 1991
- Hazardous Substances and New Organisms Act 1996
- Ozone Layer Protection Act 1996
- Climate Change Response Act 2002
- Exclusive Economic Zone and Continental Shelf (Environmental Effects) Act 2012
- COVID-19 Recovery (Fast-track Consenting) Act 2020 (repealed on 8 July 2022)
- Imports and Exports (Restrictions) Act 1988
- Imports and Exports (Restrictions) Prohibition Order (No. 2) 2004.

== Governance and leadership ==
Allan Freeth has been the EPA's chief executive since 2015.

The EPA has a number of advisory groups and decision-making committees:

- EPA Board

The EPA's Board is appointed by the minister for the environment and must have at least one member with experience relating to the Treaty of Waitangi and tikanga Māori (Māori customary values and practices). The EPA Board is chaired by Julie Hardaker.

- Ngā Kaihautū Tikanga Taiao

Ngā Kaihautū Tikanga Taiao, is a statutory Māori advisory committee legally appointed by the EPA Board. The committee provides advice to the EPA to ensure Māori perspectives are taken into account. Members provide a broad overview of Māori interests, rather than representing their individual iwi.

- Hazardous Substances and New Organisms Committee

The Hazardous Substances and New Organisms Committee considers applications to import or manufacture hazardous substances, and to introduce new organisms into New Zealand.

- Exclusive Economic Zone and Continental Shelf (Environmental Effects) Act boards of inquiry
- Nationally Significant Proposal boards of inquiry

Boards are appointed by the Minister for the Environment to decide on Section 20 activities under the EEZ Act, and for land-based proposals of national significance (the Minister for Conservation appoints boards for coastal proposals). Boards run their own processes independently from the EPA and the Minister. The EPA provides administrative support services to boards of inquiry, ranging from organising the logistics of the hearing, to commissioning specialist advice to assist the board.

== Ministers ==
The following ministers oversee its work:

- The minister for the environment
- The associate minister(s) for the environment
- The minister for climate change

== Communications ==
The EPA has a website and various social media and communication channels.

== Appropriations ==
The EPA has two primary streams of operating revenue: Crown funding, and funding from charges and fees.
