= Chris Bishop =

New Zealand politician

The Honourable Chris Bishop
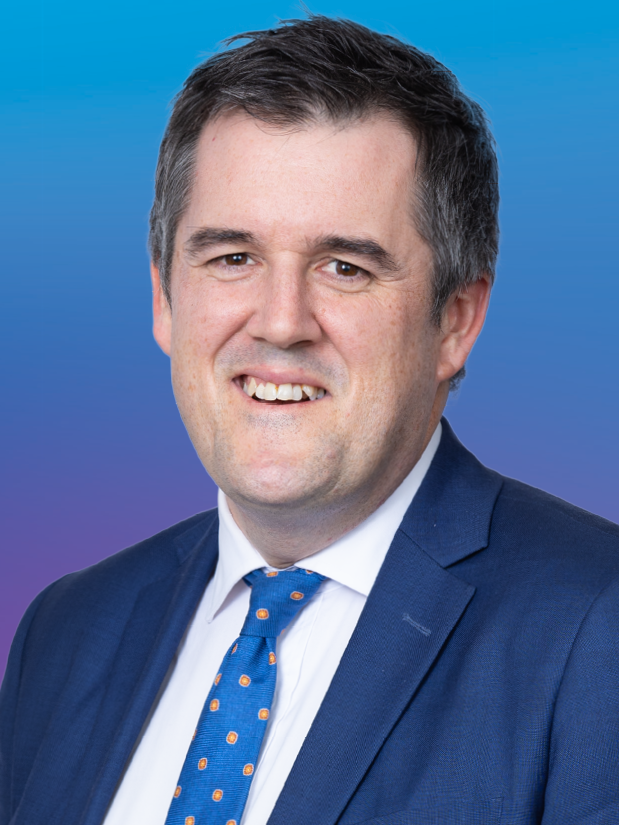
- Bishop in 2023

13th Leader of the House
- In office 27 November 2023 – 7 April 2026
- Prime Minister: Christopher Luxon
- Preceded by: Grant Robertson
- Succeeded by: Louise Upston

35th Attorney-General of New Zealand
- Incumbent
- Assumed office 7 April 2026
- Prime Minister: Christopher Luxon
- Preceded by: Judith Collins

30th Minister of Transport
- Incumbent
- Assumed office 24 January 2025
- Prime Minister: Christopher Luxon
- Preceded by: Simeon Brown

6th Minister for Housing
- Incumbent
- Assumed office 27 November 2023
- Prime Minister: Christopher Luxon
- Preceded by: Megan Woods

29th Minister for Infrastructure
- Incumbent
- Assumed office 27 November 2023
- Prime Minister: Christopher Luxon
- Preceded by: Megan Woods

1st Minister Responsible for RMA Reform
- Incumbent
- Assumed office 27 November 2023
- Prime Minister: Christopher Luxon
- Preceded by: Office established

12th Minister for Sport and Recreation
- In office 27 November 2023 – 24 January 2025
- Prime Minister: Christopher Luxon
- Preceded by: Grant Robertson
- Succeeded by: Mark Mitchell

11th Shadow Leader of the House
- In office 6 December 2021 – 19 January 2023
- Leader: Christopher Luxon
- Preceded by: Michael Woodhouse
- Succeeded by: Michael Woodhouse
- In office 16 July 2020 – 27 August 2021
- Leader: Judith Collins
- Preceded by: Gerry Brownlee
- Succeeded by: Michael Woodhouse

Member of the New Zealand Parliament
- In office 20 September 2014 – 7 November 2026
- Constituency: List (2014–17); Hutt South (2017–2020); List (2020–2023); Hutt South (2023–2026)

Personal details
- Born: Christopher John Stuart Bishop; 4 September 1983 (age 43) Lower Hutt, New Zealand
- Party: National
- Spouse: Jenna Raeburn
- Children: 2
- Education: Victoria University of Wellington
- Occupation: Manager; tobacco lobbyist

Christopher John Stuart Bishop (born 4 September 1983) is a New Zealand politician and a member of the National Party. First elected to the New Zealand House of Representatives in 2014 as a list MP, Bishop won the Hutt South electorate in 2017 but lost the seat in 2020. He returned to Parliament as a National list MP in 2020 and served as National spokesperson for Housing and Infrastructure and as the Shadow Leader of the House.

Bishop chaired National's 2023 election campaign, and again served as the electorate MP for Hutt South from 2023. He is a former lobbyist for tobacco company Phillip Morris. Bishop was an influential figure in the Sixth National Government, having been described as a "minister for everything" and as a potential successor to Christopher Luxon as party leader. He served as Leader of the House between November 2023 and April 2026. Bishop became Attorney-General in April 2026. Following the 2026 New Zealand general election, Bishop was not re-elected as a list or electorate MP. He remains a Minister for up to 28 days after the election.

== Early life ==
Bishop grew up in Lower Hutt and attended Hutt Intermediate School and Hutt International Boys' School in Upper Hutt. His father, John Bishop, was a political journalist and founder of the pressure group the New Zealand Taxpayers' Union. His mother, Rosemary Dixon, is an environmental lawyer. In 2000 he was a member of the New Zealand Youth Parliament, selected to represent List MP Muriel Newman. He graduated Victoria University of Wellington with first-class honours in Law and a Bachelor of Arts in History and Politics. He claims to have won 10 intervarsity debating tournaments, including at the Cambridge Union and Sydney Union, and a range of awards for legal argument and oratory. He met his partner, Jenna Raeburn, through the Victoria University Debating Society. Bishop worked as a summer clerk at Russell McVeagh and Crown Law while at university. While at university he had a part-time position at the Ministry of Education to draft letters for the then Minister of Education, Trevor Mallard.

After the 2008 general election, he worked as a ministerial advisor for Gerry Brownlee. Following this, he worked as the corporate affairs manager for the tobacco company Philip Morris New Zealand from 2011 to 2013. From 2013 to 2014, he was a senior adviser to Steven Joyce.

== Political career ==
New Zealand Parliament
Years	Term	Electorate	List	Party
2014–2017	51st	List	49	National
2017–2020	52nd	Hutt South	40	National
2020–2023	53rd	List	7	National
2023–2026	54th	Hutt South	3	National

Bishop's work for Philip Morris attracted headlines and comments when he stood for parliament for the National Party, given he worked against the party's plans to increase tobacco excise and introduce plain packaging. On the day of his selection as a candidate he announced that he supported both policies.

=== First term: 2014–2017 ===
He contested the Hutt South electorate at the 2014 election, where he placed second behind incumbent Labour MP Trevor Mallard but entered Parliament as a list MP for the 2014–2017 term. Redistribution of electorate boundaries prior to the election saw Hutt South lose the Labour-leaning suburb of Naenae for the National-leaning western hill suburbs, helping Bishop cut Mallard's majority from 4,825 to 709.

Let me just say finally that I come to this House with the desire to serve, to represent the people of the Hutt Valley, to apply my mind to the challenges facing New Zealand now and in the future, and to work hard each and every day for and on behalf of New Zealanders. Much faith has been placed in me by many people. I intend to work hard to repay that faith.

— Bishop in his maiden speech, 21 October 2014

Bishop served on the Finance and Expenditure, Justice and Electoral, and Regulations Review select committees. Bishop was also part of a cross-party group initiated by Jan Logie to look at and advocate for LGBTI rights. A member's bill in Bishop's name, the Compensation for Live Organ Donors’ Act 2016, passed the house unanimously. The bill aims to remove a financial deterrent to the donation of organs by live donors.

=== Second term: 2017–2020 ===
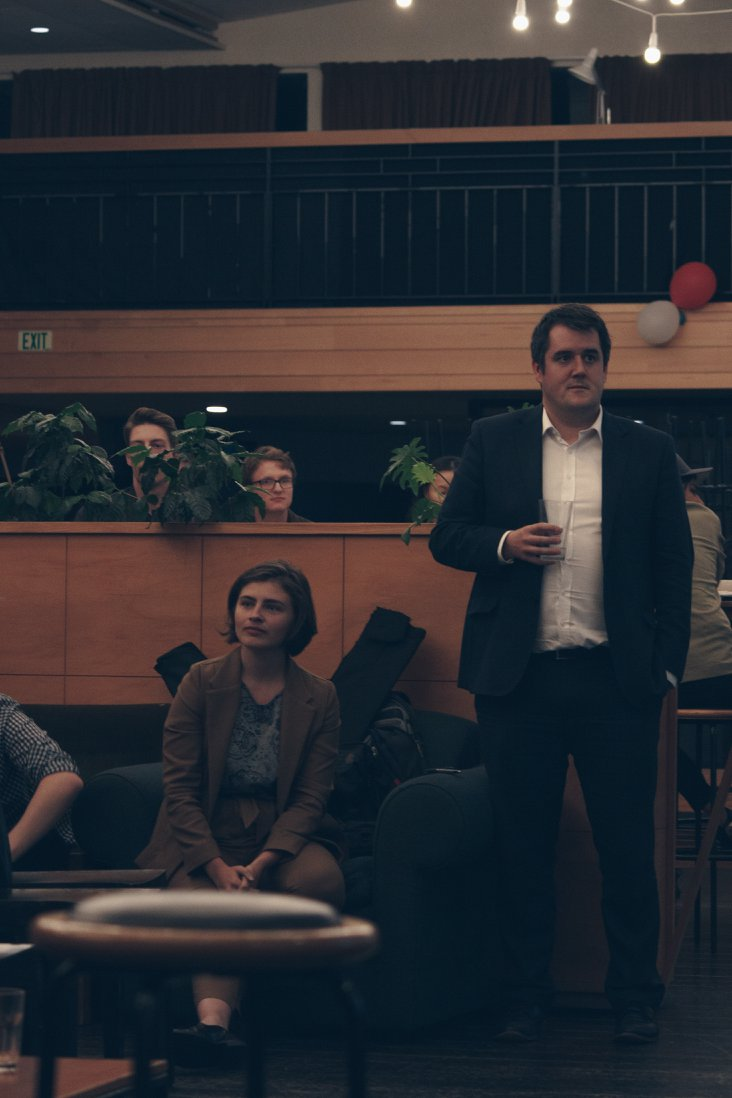
Bishop and Chlöe Swarbrick at Victoria University of Wellington, 2018

Bishop won the Hutt South electorate at the 2017 New Zealand general election. Long-serving Member of Parliament for Hutt South Trevor Mallard did not contest the election, instead choosing to only appear on the Labour list to become Speaker of the House. Ginny Andersen stood as the Labour candidate. Bishop defeated her by a margin of 1,530 votes. In doing so, Bishop became the first-ever National MP for the seat. This result was credited to a 4-year campaign in the area that donned him the title "Mr Everywhere Man".

The formation of the Sixth Labour Government saw Bishop serve in Opposition. Following Bill English's resignation in February 2018, Bishop publicly endorsed Amy Adams for Leader of the National Party. Adams represented the more liberal wing of the National Party. Adams lost the leadership vote to Simon Bridges. Bridges promoted Bishop into his shadow cabinet in June 2019, allocating him the portfolios of Transport and Regional Development.

In February 2018 it was disclosed that Bishop was using the social media platform Snapchat to communicate with his constituents including teenage girls. Parents of the affected stated that his intentions appeared misguided and not malicious. Bishop has since stated that he was running the Snapchat account to help young people become interested in politics and has changed his account so to only allow for communication with his close friends. ACT party leader David Seymour has stated his backing for Bishop, saying that "an MP's job is to engage with the young, which is what Bishop was doing".

In March 2020 Bishop went into voluntary isolation for the COVID-19 virus after visiting Australia.

Bishop played a significant role in the May 2020 leadership coup that saw Simon Bridges removed as leader and replaced by Todd Muller, acting as Muller's "numbers man" alongside Nicola Willis. He was subsequently promoted to 12th in caucus with the portfolios of Transport and Infrastructure. Muller resigned after 55 days becoming the shortest serving leader of any political party represented in Parliament in New Zealand's history, being replaced by Judith Collins. Bishop was promoted to the front bench as 7th in caucus, retaining his portfolios and gaining "Shadow Leader of the House". With Muller's backers Bishop and Willis rising under Collins, political commentators speculated that "potential dissenters are being kept busy with big new portfolios".

In June 2020, claims were made by Health Minister David Clark that Bishop lobbied for the early release from the quarantine of two sisters who later tested positive for COVID-19. Bishop later stated that he only forwarded their concern through the appropriate channels. He also stated they should have been tested before being released.

=== Third term: 2020–2023 ===
Bishop again contested the Hutt South electorate in the 2020 New Zealand general election. He lost the seat to Labour MP Ginny Andersen by a final margin of 3,777 votes. Despite this loss, Bishop was re-elected to Parliament on the National Party list.

On 28 August 2021, Bishop was stripped by party leader Collins of his Shadow Leader of the House portfolio during a reshuffle of her shadow cabinet. Collins claimed that Bishop was stepping down from the portfolio to focus on his role as the National Party's COVID-19 spokesperson. According to Stuff, Bishop had disagreed with the Party's stance on conversion therapy and pushed for a conscience vote on the proposed Conversion Practices Prohibition Legislation Bill. On 30 August, Collins denied losing her temper at Bishop and fellow National MP Erica Stanford for publicly suggesting that they disagreed with the Party's stance on the conversion therapy legislation.

After Collins was deposed as National leader in November 2021, and Christopher Luxon was elected in her place, Bishop was promoted to 4th in the National line up, retaining his COVID-19 Response portfolio in Luxon's Shadow Cabinet, and being reappointed Shadow Leader of the House. In March 2022 he was promoted to third rank in the National line-up and took on the Housing and Infrastructure portfolios. In September 2022 he was appointed as the Chairperson of National's 2023 Election Campaign, and gave up the COVID-19 Response portfolio.

On 19 January 2023, Bishop became the National Party's urban development and Resource Management Act (RMA) Reform spokesperson following a reshuffle of Luxon's Shadow Cabinet.

=== Fourth term: 2023–2026 ===
In the 2023 New Zealand general election, the Hutt South electorate preferred Bishop over Labour Party incumbent Ginny Andersen by an election night margin of 1,332 votes.

At the end of the Parlimentary term, the same electorate voted to return Ginny Andersen by a preliminary margin of 889 votes.

Following the formation of the National-led coalition government in late November 2023, Bishop became Minister of Housing, Minister for Infrastructure, Minister responsible for RMA Reform, Minister for Sport and Recreation, Leader of the House, and Associate Minister of Finance.

An October 2025 poll showed that among voters who believed the National Party should change its leader, Bishop was the most preferred choice, followed closely by Erica Stanford. Andrea Vance reported that Bishop was attempting to gather support among MPs to challenge Luxon for the leadership in November 2025 but was unsuccessful.

Following a cabinet reshuffle in early April 2026, Bishop succeeded Judith Collins as Attorney-General. He was also replaced as Leader of the House and National's election campaign chair by Louise Upston and Simeon Brown respectively.

==== Leader of the House ====
On 15 March 2024 Bishop, as Leader of the House, expressed disagreement with the Free Speech Union's (FSU) criticism of the National-led Government's repeated use of "urgency" in passing legislation during its first 100 days in power. The Government had passed 14 laws under urgency over a period of 17 weeks compared with average of 10 across a whole term. The FSU expressed concern that bills passed under urgency received less scrutiny from MPs and the public, and could become law without going through the full Select Committee process. They also wrote that the Government was not mandated explicitly to pass legislation which was not included in the policy manifestos of any of the three governing parties. In response, Bishop rejected the FSU's assertion that the frequent use of parliamentary urgency amounted to a free speech issue and cancelled his FSU membership.

On 20 May 2025 Bishop, as Leader of the House, successfully moved a motion that a parliamentary debate on the Privileges Committee's decision to suspend Te Pāti Māori MPs Rawiri Waititi, Debbie Ngarewa-Packer and Hana-Rawhiti Maipi-Clarke be deferred until 5 June. This would allowing the three MPs to participate in the debate around the 2025 New Zealand budget but does not suspend disciplinary proceedings against them. While the government coalition parties supported Bishop's motion, the opposition parties voted against it. On 5 June, Parliament voted along party lines to suspend the three Te Pāti Māori MPs.

==== Housing Minister ====
On 20 March 2024, Housing Minister Bishop and Finance Minister Nicola Willis ordered state housing provider Kāinga Ora to end the previous Labour Government's "Sustainable Tenancies Framework" and take disciplinary action against tenants with behavioural issues and persistent rent arrears. While the Government's new housing policy was criticised by the opposition Green and Labour parties' housing spokespersons Tamatha Paul and Kieran McAnulty as vindictive, ACT Party leader David Seymour and Manurewa-Papakura Ward Councillor Daniel Newman welcomed the eviction of unruly state housing tenants. By mid-July 2024, 14 state housing tenancies had been revoked in the past three months due to behavioural issues or persistent rent arrears. In addition, 80 Section 55A formal warning notices had been issued to tenants for disruptive behaviour over the past three months, compared to 13 warnings for the same period in 2023. Housing Minister Bishop praised the increase in disciplinary actions against unruly tenants, saying that "the message to Kāinga Ora tenants is clear: if your actions are causing your neighbours to live in fear and misery, your time is up. Change your behaviour now or face the consequences…" Bishop also said that the Government would prioritise families on the social housing wait list and those living in emergency housing motels.

On 11 June 2024, Bishop as Housing Minister announced that the Government would introduce legislation to amend the Overseas Investment Amendment Act 2005 to support the Government's "Build to Rent" housing development programme.

On 19 February 2026, Bishop announced that the Government would reduce the number of proposed houses in its Auckland housing intensification plan from 2 million to 1.6 million following community pushback.

==== RMA Reform Minister ====
On 23 April 2024, Bishop as RMA Reform Minister announced that the Government would scrap or ease several farming, mining, environmental and other industrial regulations as part of its planned overhaul of the Resource Management Act 1991. On 20 September, Bishop announced that the Resource Management Act 1991 would be replaced by two laws: the first would address the environmental impact of building and development activities while the second would enable urban development and infrastructure.

On 6 June 2025, Bishop rejected 17 of the Christchurch City Council's 20 recommendations to opt out of some of the Government's national housing intensification rules. Since 2022, the Council had sought to limit housing intensification and high-rise buildings in certain areas. Mayor of Christchurch Phil Mauger described the RMA Reform Minister's decision as a "kick in the guts." By contrast, Urbanist collective Greater Ōtautahi chairperson M. Grace-Stent said that the Minister's decision brought certainty after three years of delays, decision-making, submissions and hearing panels.

On 18 June 2025, Bishop announced that the Government would be amending resource management legislation to allow it to override local councils if their decisions "negatively" impacted economic growth, development and employment. He also confirmed that the Government would retain the "Medium Density Residential Standards" introduced by the previous Labour Government, reversing earlier plans by the National-led government to make them optional.

On 25 November 2025, Bishop and Local Government Minister Simon Watts announced that the Government would introduce legislation in 2026 to abolish regional councils. The Government has proposed either replacing the elected regional councillors with new Combined Territories Boards (CTBs) headed by local mayors or getting the CTBs to develop a regional reorganisation plan over a two-year period.

On 9 December 2025, Bishop announced that the Government would introduce two new bills to replace the Resource Management Act: first, a Planning Act outlining how land can be used and developed including for housing growth and second, a Natural Environment Act outlining the rules for managing the usage of natural resources and environmental protection. These two laws are expected to pass into law in late 2026 and come into effect in 2029. Key policies have included reducing the over 100 policy statements and plans to 17 Regional Combined plans, requiring local councils to compensate property owners when their property rights are affected by regulation, creating a new framework of "national instruments" that would include iwi input and environmental safeguards, and standardising zoning rules. The two companion bills passed their first reading on 16 December 2025 and were referred to the New Zealand Parliament's environment select committee. On 22 September 2026, the Planning and Natural Environment Acts passed their third readings.

On 5 May 2026, Bishop and the Local Government Minister Simon Watts announced that the Government would give local councils a three-months timeframe to develop amalgamation plans.

==== Sports and Recreation Minister ====
On 9 October 2024 Bishop, in his capacity as Sport and Recreation Minister, directed national sporting body Sport New Zealand to revise its 2022 Guiding Principles for the Inclusion of Transgender People in Community Sport. He said that the Guiding Principles were supposed to be voluntary rather than mandatory in accordance with a provision in the National-NZ First coalition agreement which "committed the Government to ensuring that publicly funded sporting bodies support fair competition that is not compromised by rules relating to gender."

==== Transport Minister ====
On 19 January 2025, Bishop was appointed as Minister of Transport during a cabinet reshuffle. On 13 April, Bishop confirmed that the Government was planning to simplify New Zealand's driving license system by replacing the second practical driving test with a 18-month trial period and reducing the number of eyesight tests required.

On 3 February 2026, Bishop confirmed that the Government would proceed with plans to eliminate the full driving test, institute a 6-12 month trial period for restricted drivers, lower licensing fees and reduce eyesight test requirements. These changes are expected to come into effect on 27 January 2027.

On 25 February 2026, Bishop announced that the Government was seeking consultation on several changes to road rules. These proposals include allowing children under the age of 12 years to ride their bikes on footpaths, allowing e-scooters to ride in cycle lanes, requiring drivers travelling under 60 km/h to give way to buses pulling out of bus stops, and easing permit and load requirements on heavy vehicles.

==== Infrastructure Minister ====
On 17 February 2026, Bishop as Minister for Infrastructure released the country's first "National Infrastructure Plan." This plan outlines 16 recommendations and 10 priorities for the next decade. Bishop said that the Government would be seeking cross-party support for the plan. By mid-June 2026, the National Infrastructure Plan had won the support of the opposition Labour and Green parties. The Government agreed to implement 13 of the 16 recommendations and four further actions including reviewing the land transport funding system, introducing legislation requiring government departments and Crown entities to develop long term investment and asset management plans, requiring infrastructure provides to maintain updated data in the National Infrastructure Network and developing a professional standard for public sector leadership.

=== Exit from Parliament ===
During the 2026 New Zealand general election, Bishop contested the Hutt South electorate for National. He was ranked third on the National Party list.

On election night, the Hutt South electorate preferred the Labour Party candidate Ginny Andersen, who won by a margin of 889 votes based on preliminary results. As the National Party's overall share of the vote entitled it to no more seats in Parliament than it had already gained in local electorates, Bishop was one of several list-only MPs who therefore were not re-elected to the next parliamentary term. On 10 November, Bishop criticised the vote splitting campaigns run by Te Pāti Māori, Mowbray and other elements for allegedly "gaming the system" by creating overhang seats and confusing voters.

== Views and positions ==
In his maiden speech, Bishop described himself as an "unashamed economic and social liberal", and is considered a prominent member of National's socially liberal faction. During his career, he has supported LGBTQ rights, decriminalising abortion, and the End of Life Choice Act 2019.

=== LGBTQ rights ===
Since 2015, Bishop has been a member of the cross-party Rainbow Parliamentary Network working group, established to support and advocate for LGBTQ rights.

Bishop welcomed the results of Australia's vote for marriage equality in 2017, stating; "marriage equality is about dignity, respect, and the legalisation of love between people of the same sex. Nothing more, and nothing less."

In 2021, Bishop reportedly disagreed with the Party's stance on conversion therapy and had pushed for a conscience vote on the Conversion Practices Prohibition Legislation Bill's first reading. In a Twitter direct message leaked to media, he said he "hated" his vote against the legislation. After the Party allowed a conscience vote on the bill's later readings, he confirmed he would vote to ban the "abhorrent" and "harmful practice".

=== Gaza war ===
In early November 2023, Bishop attracted media attention after emailing a forceful email condemning Hamas' actions during the 2023 Gaza war. Luxon subsequently spoke to Bishop about the email, stating that the "strong language" was "also representative of strong emotions on all sides of this debate."

=== 2025 Aotearoa Music Awards ===
Bishop made headlines following the 2025 Aotearoa Music Awards on 29 May 2025 after a video of him "ranting" at the ceremony circulated online. During a performance of Māori Ki te Ao by Stan Walker featuring performers on stage waving tino rangatiratanga and Toitū te Tiriti flags and banners, Bishop was recorded calling it "a load of crap" and "performative acclaim". Some attendees alleged Bishop appeared to be drunk.

Bishop declined to apologise for the comments, saying he was frustrated by the "politicisation" of the performance, but admitted he should have kept it to himself. Bishop acknowledged he had consumed alcohol but denied he was intoxicated.

== Public image ==
Bishop has been named as a contender for a potential National leader, though he has downplayed ambitions in that direction. The Post named Bishop 2025's "politician of the year" and "the main character of New Zealand politics", despite not being a party leader. The Post noted that Bishop is "not the first 'minister of everything' but he is one with an incredible level of prominence", and that he has reached out beyond National's traditional base. The Post cited him as the biggest threat to Christopher Luxon for the leadership of the National Party.

== Personal life ==
Bishop has a son born in June 2022 with his wife, Jenna Raeburn. They had a daughter in October 2024.

In 2020, amidst the COVID-19 pandemic in New Zealand, and following the lowering of COVID-19 alert levels, Bishop appeared in parliament with a mullet, nicknamed the 'Bishmullet'. He states he did it to raise money for a local charity Good Bitches Baking, raising $10,000 for the charity through online donations.

Political offices
Preceded by Gerry Brownlee	Shadow Leader of the House; 2020–2021; 2021–2023	Succeeded by Michael Woodhouse
Preceded by Michael Woodhouse	Shadow Leader of the House; 2020–2021; 2021–2023	Succeeded by Michael Woodhouse
New Zealand Parliament
Preceded by Trevor Mallard	Member of Parliament for Hutt South; 2017–2020; 2023–2026	Succeeded by Ginny Andersen
Preceded by Ginny Andersen	Member of Parliament for Hutt South; 2017–2020; 2023–2026	Succeeded by Ginny Andersen
