= Results of the 2026 New Zealand general election =

Map of preliminary results of the 2026 election

This article summarises results of the 7 November 2026 New Zealand general election, including both party vote and electorate vote outcomes.

== Release of results ==
Preliminary results were released gradually after polling booths closed at 19:00 (NZDT) on 7 November. The preliminary count only included advance ordinary and election day ordinary votes; It does not include any special votes, which are not counted until the official count. Following election night, voting papers and electoral rolls will be returned to their respective electorate returning officers, a process that can take up to ten days for special votes. A master electoral roll will be compiled to identify any instances of multiple voting, and special votes will be processed and checked. All votes will then undergo an official count. The Electoral Commission is scheduled to declare the official results on 27 November 2026, 20 days after the election.

== Party vote ==
=== Overall results ===
Party vote percentage
1. Labour (29.4%)
2. National (29.2%)
3. Green (13.3%)
4. ACT (10.9%)
5. NZ First (9.78%)
6. Opportunity (5.96%)
7. Māori (0.57%)
8. Other (0.90%)

Preliminary results of the 7 November 2026 election for the House of Representatives
Party	Party vote				Electorate vote sum				Total seats	+/-
Party	Votes	Of total (%)	Change (pp)	Seats	Votes	Of total (%)	Change (pp)	Seats	Total seats	+/-
National	706,680	29.21	▼8.86	0	992,314	41.26	▼2.21	42	42	▼6
Labour	710,330	29.36	▲2.45	15	812,660	33.79	▲2.58	21	36	▲2
Green	321,902	13.30	▲1.70	14	214,064	8.90	▲0.64	2	16	▲1
ACT	264,121	10.92	▲2.28	12	90,296	3.76	▼1.70	1	13	▲2
NZ First	236,630	9.78	▲3.70	12	120,618	5.02	▲2.22	0	12	▲4
Opportunity	144,298	5.96	▲3.74	7	52,913	2.20	▲1.18	0	7	▲7
Te Pāti Māori	13,845	0.57	▼2.51	0	81,682	3.40	▼0.49	5	5	▼1
Legalise Cannabis	4,829	0.19	▼0.26	0	4,880	0.20	▼0.26	0	0	Steady
Outdoors	2,685	0.11		0	3,214	0.13		0	0	Steady
Animal Justice	2,585	0.10	▼0.07	0	2,881	0.12	▼0.09	0	0	Steady
Conservative	1,886	0.07	▼0.08	0	651	0.03	▼0.09	0	0	Steady
Women's Rights	1,856	0.07	▼0.01	0	0	0.00	0.00	0	0	Steady
NZ Loyal	1,855	0.07	▼1.13	0	3,239	0.14	▼1.04	0	0	Steady
Vision New Zealand	1,529	0.06		0	857	0.04		0	0	Steady
Te Tai Tokerau	1,217	0.05		0	4,059	0.17		0	0	new
Free Palestine	1,168	0.04		0	136	0.01		0	0	new
Alliance	1,149	0.04		0	1,572	0.07		0	0	new
Independent					18,734	0.78	▼0.47	0	0	Steady
Valid votes	2,418,565				2,404,770					
Informal votes	13,838	0.49			27,633	0.98				
Disallowed votes										
Special votes	399,365	14.10			399,365	14.10				
Total	2,831,768	100.00		60	2,831,768	100.00		71	131	
Eligible voters and turnout	3,796,891	74.58								

=== By electorate ===
The following is a breakdown of the party vote received in each electorate, for parties receiving at least 1% of the nationwide party vote or a seat in parliament.

Electorate	Labour	National	Green	ACT	NZ First	Opportunity	Māori
Auckland Central	25.8	26.6	20.0	11.0	5.2	10.6	0.2
Banks Peninsula	28.0	26.0	17.9	9.0	8.1	10.2	<0.1
Botany	18.3	51.2	5.8	12.6	7.2	4.4	<0.1
Christchurch Central	32.3	23.5	18.7	7.7	7.4	9.3	<0.1
Christchurch East	36.9	21.6	15.5	8.1	10.4	5.9	0.2
Coromandel	19.5	34.6	8.1	16.4	16.0	4.3	0.1
Dunedin	33.4	16.8	26.0	6.6	7.5	6.6	0.2
East Cape	28.4	30.4	9.8	13.4	12.6	4.2	0.5
East Coast Bays	18.6	44.5	8.1	14.0	8.3	5.7	0.1
Epsom	16.9	42.8	11.7	15.5	4.4	8.4	<0.1
Glendene	41.5	23.6	14.0	5.7	8.5	5.7	0.2
Hamilton East	30.3	31.9	12.4	9.5	8.7	6.4	0.2
Hamilton West	32.4	29.7	11.5	9.9	10.0	5.4	0.3
Henderson	43.7	25.4	10.8	6.2	9.0	3.9	0.2
Hutt South	36.6	24.9	14.0	6.9	7.9	9.0	0.3
Ilam	25.5	35.3	12.6	10.7	6.9	8.3	<0.1
Invercargill	27.1	33.7	7.5	13.4	13.2	3.9	0.1
Kaikōura	20.4	34.7	7.8	16.0	15.1	5.0	<0.1
Kaipara ki Mahurangi	17.3	37.4	9.0	17.3	12.9	5.6	<0.1
Kapiti	31.1	28.2	12.9	9.2	9.2	8.8	0.1
Kenepuru	42.5	20.3	15.1	5.7	7.1	8.6	0.2
Māngere	64.5	11.7	8.4	2.5	9.2	2.7	0.3
Manurewa	59.4	17.1	8.2	2.6	9.4	1.9	0.3
Maungakiekie	32.4	30.6	12.8	9.2	6.3	8.0	0.1
Mount Albert	31.1	25.0	20.3	7.5	5.2	10.3	0.2
Mt Maunganui	19.1	38.6	8.2	14.8	12.8	5.6	0.2
Mount Roskill	36.1	34.0	11.0	6.5	5.9	5.3	0.1
Napier	26.0	34.3	8.6	14.8	10.5	5.1	0.1
Nelson	29.0	27.1	13.5	11.6	9.4	8.3	0.1
New Plymouth	24.0	33.9	9.3	13.5	12.3	6.0	0.2
North Shore	20.1	40.4	9.5	15.5	6.0	8.0	<0.1
Northcote	28.1	32.0	13.4	9.8	7.5	8.4	<0.1
Northland	20.7	29.6	10.6	16.2	16.6	4.6	0.3
Ōtāhuhu	63.6	15.6	7.1	2.3	8.0	2.2	0.3
Pakuranga	20.2	46.6	7.0	12.7	7.7	5.2	<0.1
Palmerston North	32.8	26.7	12.3	10.4	10.4	6.2	0.2
Papakura	28.3	38.1	6.5	12.0	10.8	3.2	0.2
Port Waikato	20.6	37.9	6.6	16.0	13.9	3.7	0.2
Rangitata	26.3	36.5	5.8	14.8	11.9	3.7	<0.1
Rangitīkei	26.7	30.3	7.6	14.7	15.2	4.3	0.2
Remutaka	41.1	21.0	12.5	7.6	10.2	6.8	0.2
Rotorua	24.3	32.3	9.1	13.5	14.4	5.3	0.4
Selwyn	21.1	36.6	8.4	15.3	11.8	6.0	<0.1
Southland	17.0	39.1	8.6	17.2	11.0	5.8	0.1
Taieri	34.2	26.0	11.4	10.3	11.6	5.6	0.2
Takanini	37.1	37.6	7.2	6.1	8.1	3.1	0.2
Tāmaki	20.7	41.2	8.7	16.6	5.0	7.4	<0.1
Taranaki-King Country	18.6	36.4	8.0	17.6	13.8	4.2	0.3
Taupō	22.4	36.2	7.0	16.9	11.9	4.7	0.2
Tauranga	19.9	37.2	7.9	14.2	13.8	6.1	0.2
Tukituki	24.7	33.9	8.4	15.4	11.7	5.1	0.2
Upper Harbour	23.9	40.6	9.0	12.0	7.6	6.3	0.1
Waikato	18.7	39.7	6.0	16.9	13.6	4.1	0.2
Waimakariri	25.1	33.6	8.4	14.0	12.9	5.1	<0.1
Wairarapa	28.9	31.0	8.7	12.8	12.2	5.2	0.1
Waitākere	31.3	25.5	17.2	8.8	9.2	7.1	0.2
Waitaki	20.2	36.6	9.6	15.6	11.4	5.8	<0.1
Wellington Bays	34.3	14.9	29.0	4.5	4.1	12.6	0.2
Wellington North	30.4	18.0	27.1	5.7	3.1	15.1	0.1
West Coast-Tasman	21.0	29.7	11.3	14.4	15.8	6.0	0.1
Whanganui	26.4	30.8	9.4	12.5	15.5	4.3	0.2
Whangaparāoa	17.3	40.6	7.5	16.7	12.3	4.7	<0.1
Whangārei	23.6	30.5	10.5	13.4	15.4	5.3	0.2
Wigram	33.9	29.1	12.0	8.0	9.1	7.0	0.1
Māori electorates
Hauraki-Waikato	50.3	2.6	34.4	0.8	3.5	1.5	5.6
Ikaroa-Rāwhiti	55.0	1.7	32.1	0.5	2.9	1.6	5.4
Tāmaki Makaurau	48.4	2.2	35.6	0.6	3.5	2.5	5.7
Te Tai Hauāuru	46.7	2.4	37.1	0.7	4.0	2.0	5.7
Te Tai Tokerau	44.3	3.0	36.8	0.8	4.7	2.3	4.4
Te Tai Tonga	40.5	5.4	37.2	1.7	6.1	3.9	3.5
Waiariki	46.7	1.7	38.0	0.5	3.1	1.8	6.9

== Electorate results ==
The table below shows the preliminary results of the electorate vote in the 2026 general election:

Key

Labour
National
Green
ACT
Te Pāti Māori
NZ First
Opportunity
Te Tai Tokerau
Independent

Electorate results of the 2026 New Zealand general election
Electorate	Incumbent	Winner	Majority	Runner up	Third place
Auckland Central	Chlöe Swarbrick		2,831	Candace Kinser	Naisi Chen
Banks Peninsula	Vanessa Weenink	Tracey McLellan	2,261	Vanessa Weenink	Craig Pauling
Botany	Christopher Luxon		13,073	Neru Leavasa	Craig Stobo
Christchurch Central	Duncan Webb	George Hampton	2,632	Dale Stephens	Kahurangi Carter
Christchurch East	Reuben Davidson		9,012	Alexandra Davids	Teresa Butler
Coromandel	Scott Simpson		14,932	Glen Bennett	Pamela Grealey
Dunedin	Rachel Brooking		8,718	Francisco Hernandez	Kristine Asuncion
East Cape	New electorate	Dana Kirkpatrick	5,325	Jo Luxton	Jordan Walker
East Coast Bays	Erica Stanford		13,819	Brendan McEnroe	Abe McKee
Epsom	David Seymour		2,044	Paul Goldsmith	Camilla Belich
Glendene	New electorate	Carmel Sepuloni	6,940	Sunil Kumar	Yasmine Serhan
Hamilton East	Ryan Hamilton		456	Georgie Dansey	Nicola Laboyrie
Hamilton West	Tama Potaka		2,181	Myra Williamson	Louise Hutt
Henderson	New electorate	Phil Twyford	6,213	Angee Nicholas	Alika Wells
Hutt South	Chris Bishop	Ginny Andersen	889	Chris Bishop	Courtney White
Ilam	Hamish Campbell		6,712	Rata Jamieson	Mike Davidson
Invercargill	Penny Simmonds		9,615	Janice Lee	Dave Kennedy
Kaikōura	Stuart Smith		8,018	Matthew Flight	Jamie Arbuckle
Kaipara ki Mahurangi	Chris Penk	Jessica Rowe	12,592	Jolyon Swinburn	Simon Court
Kapiti	New electorate	Tim Costley	2,077	Sophie Handford	Melody Willis
Kenepuru	New electorate	Barbara Edmonds	9,297	Matthew Evetts	Lan Pham
Māngere	Lemauga Lydia Sosene		11,970	Rosemary Burke	Michel Mulipola
Manurewa	Arena Williams		10,973	Ghouse Majeed	Esther Tofilau Tevaga
Maungakiekie	Greg Fleming		2,952	Priyanca Radhakrishnan	Adam Powell
Mount Albert	Helen White		4,678	Melissa Lee	Qiulae Wong
Mount Maunganui	New electorate	Tom Rutherford	14,059	Rhieve Grey	Tracey Coxhead
Mount Roskill	Carlos Cheung	Michael Wood	262	Carlos Cheung	Anjana Iyer
Napier	Katie Nimon		6,847	Alex Hedley	Te Kira Lawrence
Nelson	Rachel Boyack	Blair Cameron	1,210	Rachel Boyack	Rohan O'Neill-Stevens
New Plymouth	David MacLeod		7,788	Amanda Clinton-Gohdes	Sarah Lucas
North Shore	Simon Watts		11,151	Sam Collins	Josh Jacobsen
Northcote	Dan Bidois		3,064	Shanan Halbert	Bhen Goodsir
Northland	Grant McCallum		7,942	Ashleigh Litmer	Shane Jones
Ōtāhuhu	New electorate	Jenny Salesa	10,558	Lalit Arya	Te Whatanui Skipwith
Pakuranga	Simeon Brown		13,691	Campbell Matthews	Kevin Huang
Palmerston North	Tangi Utikere		2,933	Ankit Bansal	Teanau Tuiono
Papakura	Judith Collins	Emma Chatterton	8,394	Anahila Kanongata'a	Angela Dalton
Port Waikato	Andrew Bayly	Matthew Paul	10,437	Matt Brachi	Casey Costello
Rangitata	James Meager		13,917	Sange Malama	Isaac Nicholson
Rangitīkei	Suze Redmayne		5,506	Karl Severinsen	Steve Gibson
Remutaka	Chris Hipkins		14,424	Zabeen Lateef	Andy Foster
Rotorua	Todd McClay		5,301	Fisher Wang	Billy Brown
Selwyn	Nicola Grigg		13,941	Sunita Gautam	Alma de Anda
Southland	Joseph Mooney		11,484	Peter McDonald	Jason Herrick
Taieri	Ingrid Leary		4,798	Matthew French	Mark Patterson
Takanini	Rima Nakhle		1,487	Kharag Singh	Elliot Ikilei
Tāmaki	Brooke van Velden	Mahesh Muralidhar	5,356	Max Harris	James Christmas
Taranaki-King Country	Barbara Kuriger		12,031	David Pattemore	Lee Smith
Taupō	Louise Upston		13,052	Chris Flatt	Celine Kearney
Tauranga	Sam Uffindell		10,274	Jan Tinetti	Bryan Norton
Tukituki	Catherine Wedd		8,933	Dan Scott	Taine Randell
Upper Harbour	Cameron Brewer		8,967	Hannah Pia Baral	Ryan Richards
Waikato	Tim van de Molen		12,576	Jamie Toko	Robbie Cookson
Waimakariri	Matt Doocey		11,283	Dan Rosewarne	Jackie Farrelly
Wairarapa	Mike Butterick		139	Kieran McAnulty	Ron Mark
Waitākere	New electorate	Vanushi Walters	2,675	Agnes Loheni	Steve Abel
Waitaki	Miles Anderson		8,352	Damien O'Connor	Sean Beamish
Wellington Bays	New electorate	Craig Renney	140	Julie Anne Genter	Karunā Muthu
Wellington North	New electorate	Tamatha Paul	3,006	Ayesha Verrall	Jonathan Pitts
West Coast-Tasman	Maureen Pugh	Katie Milne	6,601	Rory Paterson	Jamie Cleine
Whanganui	Carl Bates		6,748	Angela Roberts	Harete Hipango
Whangaparāoa	Mark Mitchell		15,368	Estefania Muller Pallarès	Helena Roza
Whangārei	Shane Reti	Lloyd Budd	1,092	Gary Payinda	Vince Cocurullo
Wigram	Megan Woods	Dominik Yanzick	1,935	Tracy Summerfield	Shreejan Pandey
Māori electorates
Hauraki-Waikato	Hana-Rawhiti Maipi-Clarke		10,441	Kingi Kiriona	Neil Denby
Ikaroa-Rāwhiti	Cushla Tangaere-Manuel		3,132	Haley Maxwell	Heather Te Au-Skipworth
Tāmaki Makaurau	Oriini Kaipara		7,470	Kerrin Leoni	Florence Te Ohaere
Te Tai Hauāuru	Debbie Ngarewa-Packer		3,841	Te Pūoho Kātene	Coral Raukawa
Te Tai Tokerau	Mariameno Kapa-Kingi	Aperahama Edwards	436	Hūhana Lyndon	Willow-Jean Prime
Te Tai Tonga	Tākuta Ferris	Mananui Ramsden	2,773	Lisa Te Morenga	Lisa Marie Murch
Waiariki	Rawiri Waititi		2,274	Tania Waikato	Toni Boynton

Based on the election night results, The New Zealand Herald considers five electorates as not decided yet:

- Wairarapa, where Kieran McAnulty (Labour Party) trails Mike Butterick (National Party) by 139 votes.
- Wellington Bays, where Julie Anne Genter (Green Party) trails Craig Renney (Labour Party) by 140 votes.
- Mount Roskill, where Carlos Cheung (National Party) trails Michael Wood (Labour Party) by 262 votes.
- Te Tai Tokerau, where Hūhana Lyndon (Green Party) trails Aperahama Edwards (Te Pāti Māori) by 436 votes.
- Hamilton East, where Georgie Dansey (Labour Party) trails Ryan Hamilton (National Party) by 456 votes.

== List results ==
The following list candidates are presumed elected based on the preliminary results. National and Te Pāti Māori did not win any list seats as they both caused an overhang.

ACT	Green	Labour	NZ First	Opportunity
Nicole McKee (2); Andrew Hoggard (3); Paul Henry (4); Karen Chhour (5); Todd Stephenson (6); James Christmas (7); Simon Court (8); Laura McClure (9); Parmjeet Parmar (10); Iain Murray (11); Cameron Luxton (12); Antonia Modkova (13)	Marama Davidson (1); Teanau Tuiono (3); Julie Anne Genter (5); Lan Pham (6); Hūhana Lyndon (7); Lawrence Xu-Nan (8); Ricardo Menéndez March (9); Francisco Hernandez (10); Kahurangi Carter (11); Steve Abel (12); Tania Waikato (13); Craig Pauling (14); Scott Willis (15); Rohan O'Neill-Stevens (16)	Willie Jackson (4); Megan Woods (5); Ayesha Verrall (6); Willow-Jean Prime (7); Kieran McAnulty (10); Rakesh Naidoo (13); Jan Tinetti (15); Damien O'Connor (16); Jo Luxton (17); Priyanca Radhakrishnan (18); Shanan Halbert (19); Chris Flatt (20); Kingi Kiriona (22); Camilla Belich (23); Glen Bennett (25)	Winston Peters (1); Shane Jones (2); Casey Costello (3); Mark Patterson (4); Alfred Ngaro (5); Michael Laws (6); Harete Hipango (7); Craig Stobo (8); Taine Randell (9); Jenny Marcroft (10); Andy Foster (11); David Wilson (12)	Qiulae Wong (1); Daniel Eb (2); Jessica Hammond (3); Kayla Kingdon-Bebb (4); Eden Skipper (5); Jodie Kuntzsch (6); Sarah Lucas (7)

== MPs who lost their seats ==
Based on preliminary results, the following MPs lost their seats:

Name	Party	Electorate/List	Term in office
Jamie Arbuckle	NZ First	List	2023–2026
Chris Bishop	National	Hutt South	2014–2026
Rachel Boyack	Labour	Nelson	2020–2026
Gerry Brownlee	National	List	1996–2026
Mark Cameron	ACT	List	2020–2026
Carlos Cheung	National	Mount Roskill	2023–2026
Georgie Dansey	Labour	List	2026
Mike Davidson	Green	List	2025–2026
Tākuta Ferris	Independent	Te Tai Tonga	2023–2026
Paul Goldsmith	National	List	2011–2026
Mariameno Kapa-Kingi	Te Tai Tokerau	Te Tai Tokerau	2023–2026
Melissa Lee	National	List	2008–2026
Nancy Lu	National	List	2023–2026
Dan Rosewarne	Labour	List	2022–2023, 2026
Deborah Russell	Labour	List	2017–2026
Vanessa Weenink	National	Banks Peninsula	2023–2026
Nicola Willis	National	List	2018–2026
