= Party lists in the 2026 New Zealand general election =

New Zealand political candidates in the MMP era
Year	Party list	Candidates
1996	party lists	by electorate
1999	party lists	by electorate
2002	party lists	by electorate
2005	party lists	by electorate
2008	party lists	by electorate
2011	party lists	by electorate
2014	party lists	by electorate
2017	party lists	by electorate
2020	party lists	by electorate
2023	party lists	by electorate
2026	party lists	by electorate

The 2026 New Zealand general election was held on Saturday, 7 November 2026, to determine the membership of the 55th New Zealand Parliament. This page lists candidates by party, including their ranking on a list. Full official lists were published on 9 October.

== Incumbent parliamentary parties ==
Names in bold font are current members of the House of Representatives.

=== ACT Party ===
ACT New Zealand released their list on 13 September 2026.

Rank	Name	Incumbency	Contesting electorate	Previous rank	Change	Initial results	Later changes
1	**David Seymour**	Electorate	Epsom	1	0		
2	**Nicole McKee**	List	Wellington Bays	3	+1		
3	**Andrew Hoggard**	List	Rangitīkei	5	+2		
4	Paul Henry			—	—		
5	**Karen Chhour**	List	North Shore	6	+1		
6	**Todd Stephenson**	List	Southland	4	−2		
7	James Christmas		Tāmaki	(National: 28)	+21		
8	**Simon Court**	List	Kaipara ki Mahurangi	8	0		
9	**Laura McClure**	List	Wigram	10	+1		
10	**Parmjeet Parmar**	List	Pakuranga	9	−1		
11	Iain Murray		Selwyn	—	—		
12	**Cameron Luxton**	List	Mount Maunganui	11	−1		
13	Antonia Modkova		Auckland Central	12	−1		
14	Alex Price		Mount Albert	—	—		
15	Janelle Hocking		West Coast-Tasman	(National: 72)	+57		
16	Ash Parmar		Waikato	13	−3		
17	Yang Qu		Mount Roskill	—	—		
18	Davina Smolders			—	—		
19	Amanda Roberts		Glendene	—	—		
20	Callum Sheridan		Waitakere	—	—		
21	Henrietta Devoe		Ōtāhuhu	—	—		
22	Samuel Mills		East Coast Bays	—	—		
23	Nigel Elder		Remutaka	—	—		
24	Tom Spooner		Kaikōura	—	—		
25	Juan Alvarez de Lugo		Maungakiekie	33	+8		
26	Manu Singh		Māngere	—	—		
27	Helena Roza		Whangaparāoa	—	—		
28	Ali Dahche		Botany	—	—		
29	Malkiat Singh		Papakura	—	—		
30	Ash Bettridge		Waimakariri	—	—		
31	Zachary Wellman		Banks Peninsula	—	—		
32	Robbie Byars		Taieri	—	—		
33	Matthew Hague		Wellington North	—	—		
34	Nick Peirce		Henderson	—	—		
35	Darrin Hawkes		East Cape	—	—		
36	Panos Patros		Upper Harbour	—	—		
37	Aaron Allred		Rangitata	—	—		
38	Doug Graham		Whangārei	—	—		
39	Toni Severin	(Former MP)	Christchurch East	14	−25		
40	John Ormond		Napier	—	—		
41	Bryan Norton		Tauranga	—	—		
42	Martin Lundqvist		Northcote	—	—		
43	Sarah Lochead-Macmillan		Port Waikato	—	—		
44	Ken Harpur		Ilam	—	—		
45	Sean Beamish		Waitaki	38	−7		
46	Chris Baillie	(Former MP)	Nelson	17	−29		

=== Green Party ===
The Green Party has a two-stage process to determine its party list: an initial list determined by attendees of the annual Green Party conference and then a vote and ordering by members of the party to either uphold the list or generate a different list voted on by the party. The initial list was published on 12 March 2026.

Rank	Name	Portrait	Incumbency	Contesting electorate	Previous rank	Change	Initial results	Later changes
1	**Marama Davidson**		List		1	0		
2	**Chlöe Swarbrick**		Electorate	Auckland Central	3	+1		
3	**Teanau Tuiono**		List	Palmerston North	5	+2		
4	**Tamatha Paul**		Electorate	Wellington North	—	—		
5	**Julie Anne Genter**		Electorate	Wellington Bays	4	−1		
6	**Hūhana Lyndon**		List	Te Tai Tokerau	10	+4		
7	**Lawrence Xu-Nan**		List	Epsom	16	+9		
8	**Lan Pham**		List	Kenepuru	6	−2		
9	**Ricardo Menéndez March**		List	Mount Albert	8	−1		
10	**Francisco Hernandez**		List	Dunedin	17	+7		
11	**Kahurangi Carter**		List	Christchurch Central	14	+3		
12	Craig Pauling			Banks Peninsula	—	—		
13	Bhen Goodsir				—	—		
14	**Steve Abel**		List	Waitakere	9	−5		
15	Tania Waikato			Waiariki	—	—		
16	**Scott Willis**		List	Taieri	12	−4		
17	Rohan O'Neill-Stevens			Nelson	—	—		
18	Yasmine Serhan			Glendene	—	—		
19	Heather Te Au-Skipworth			Ikaroa-Rāwhiti	—	—		
20	Louise Hutt			Hamilton West	—	—		
21	Shreejan Pandey				—	—		
22	**Mike Davidson**		List	Ilam	19	−3		
23	Asher Wilson-Goldman			Kapiti	—	—		
24	Zephyr Brown			Kaipara ki Mahurangi	31	+7		
25	Angela Dalton			Papakura	—	—		
26	Josh Jacobsen				—	—		
27	Lauren Craig				—	—		
28	Carl Morgan			Port Waikato	—	—		
29	Nathan Gray				—	—		
30	Te Whatanui Skipwith				—	—		
32	Alika Wells			Henderson	—	—		
33	Courtney White			Hutt South	—	—		
34	Awhi Haenga			Whanganui	—	—		
35	Pamela Grealey			Coromandel	35	0		
36	Alma de Anda				—	—		
37	Chris Norton			Remutaka	43	+6		
38	Melody Willis				—	—		

The final list was released on 22 April 2026. Whanganui candidate Awhi Haenga, ranked 31st on the list, withdrew her candidacy on 27 May, citing family issues.

Rank	Name	Portrait	Incumbency	Contesting electorate	Previous rank	Change	Initial results	Later changes
1	**Marama Davidson**		List		1	0		
2	**Chlöe Swarbrick**		Electorate	Auckland Central	3	+1		
3	**Teanau Tuiono**		List	Palmerston North	5	+2		
4	**Tamatha Paul**		Electorate	Wellington North	—	—		
5	**Julie Anne Genter**		Electorate	Wellington Bays	4	−1		
6	**Lan Pham**		List	Kenepuru	6	0		
7	**Hūhana Lyndon**		List	Te Tai Tokerau	10	+3		
8	**Lawrence Xu-Nan**		List	Epsom	16	+8		
9	**Ricardo Menéndez March**		List	Mount Albert	8	−1		
10	**Francisco Hernandez**		List	Dunedin	17	+7		
11	**Kahurangi Carter**		List	Christchurch Central	14	+3		
12	**Steve Abel**		List	Waitakere	9	−3		
13	Tania Waikato			Waiariki	—	—		
14	Craig Pauling			Banks Peninsula	—	—		
15	**Scott Willis**		List	Taieri	12	−3		
16	Rohan O'Neill-Stevens			Nelson	—	—		
17	Bhen Goodsir			Northcote	—	—		
18	Yasmine Serhan			Glendene	—	—		
19	Louise Hutt			Hamilton West	—	—		
20	**Mike Davidson**		List	Ilam	19	−1		
21	Heather Te Au-Skipworth			Ikaroa-Rāwhiti	—	—		
22	Shreejan Pandey			Wigram	—	—		
23	Lauren Craig			Wairarapa	—	—		
24	Zephyr Brown			Kaipara ki Mahurangi	31	+7		
25	Josh Jacobsen			North Shore	—	—		
26	Angela Dalton			Papakura	—	—		
27	Alika Wells			Henderson	—	—		
28	Carl Morgan			Port Waikato	—	—		
29	Courtney White			Hutt South	—	—		
30	Te Whatanui Skipwith			Ōtāhuhu	—	—		
31	Melody Willis			Kapiti	—	—		
32	Pamela Grealey			Coromandel	35	+3		
33	Alma de Anda			Selwyn	—	—		
34	Chris Norton			Remutaka	43	+9		
35	Abe McKee			East Coast Bays	—	—		
36	Adam Powell			Maungakiekie	—	—		
37	Andrew Charles Beaumont			West Coast-Tasman	—	—		
38	Anjana Iyer			Mount Roskill	—	—		
39	Bernard Long			Rangitīkei	37	−2		
40	Daniël Oosthuizen			Tauranga	—	—		
41	Dave Kennedy			Invercargill	22	−19		
42	Dave Richards			Rangitata	—	—		
43	Donald Mackenzie-Mayo			Tāmaki	—	—		
44	Florence Te Ohaere			Tāmaki Makaurau	—	—		
45	Jordan Walker			East Cape	49	+4		
46	Lisa Te Morenga			Te Tai Tonga	—	—		
47	Mark Norman Longworth			Tukituki	—	—		
48	Mike Finlayson			Northland	—	—		
49	Michel Mulipola			Māngere	—	—		
50	Phil McCabe			Taranaki-King Country	—	—		
51	Pualele Joan Westhead			Mount Maunganui	—	—		
52	Roy Peter Boonen			Napier	—	—		
53	Ryan Richards			Upper Harbour	—	—		
54	Richard Wesley			Waimakariri	26	−28		
55	Teresa Butler			Christchurch East	(Te Pāti Māori: 22)	−33		

=== Labour Party ===
The Labour Party released its list on 8 June 2026. On 22 September, list-only candidate Warrick Cleine withdrew his candidacy following controversy over the fact that he doesn't live in New Zealand.

Rank	Name	Portrait	Incumbency	Contesting electorate	Previous rank	Change	Initial results	Later changes
1	**Chris Hipkins**		Electorate	Remutaka	1	0		
2	**Carmel Sepuloni**		Electorate	Glendene	3	+1		
3	**Barbara Edmonds**		Electorate	Kenepuru	18	+15		
4	**Willie Jackson**		List		8	+4		
5	**Megan Woods**		Electorate		5	0		
6	**Ayesha Verrall**		List	Wellington North	7	+1		
7	**Willow-Jean Prime**		List	Te Tai Tokerau	9	+2		
8	**Vanushi Walters**		List	Waitakere	30	+22		
9	**Cushla Tangaere-Manuel**		Electorate	Ikaroa-Rawhiti	—	—		
10	**Kieran McAnulty**		List	Wairarapa	16	+6		
11	**Rachel Brooking**		Electorate	Dunedin	23	+12		
12	**Ginny Andersen**		List	Hutt South	17	+5		
13	Rakesh Naidoo				—	—		
14	**Tangi Utikere**		Electorate	Palmerston North	25	+11		
15	**Jan Tinetti**		List	Tauranga	6	−9		
16	**Damien O'Connor**		List	Waitaki	10	−6		
17	**Jo Luxton**		List	East Cape	19	+2		
18	**Priyanca Radhakrishnan**		List	Maungakiekie	15	−3		
19	**Shanan Halbert**		List	Northcote	28	+9		
20	Chris Flatt			Taupō	—	—		
21	**Reuben Davidson**		Electorate	Christchurch East	57	+36		
22	Kingi Kiriona			Hauraki-Waikato	—	—		
23	**Camilla Belich**		List	Epsom	26	+3		
24	**Jenny Salesa**		Electorate	Ōtāhuhu	24	0		
25	**Glen Bennett**		List	Coromandel	29	+4		
26	Sophie Handford			Kapiti	—	—		
27	**Deborah Russell**		List		22	−5		
28	**Tracey McLellan**		List	Banks Peninsula	27	−1		
29	Max Harris			Tāmaki	—	—		
30	Ibrahim Omer		(Former MP)		37	+7		
31	Neru Leavasa		(Former MP)	Botany	38	+7		
32	**Georgie Dansey**		List	Hamilton East	31	−1		
33	Te Pūoho Kātene			Te Tai Hauāuru	—	—		
34	Naisi Chen		(Former MP)	Auckland Central	33	−1		
35	**Dan Rosewarne**		List	Waimakariri	32	−3		
36	**Rachel Boyack**		Electorate	Nelson	42	+6		
37	**Helen White**		Electorate	Mount Albert	47	+10		
38	**Ingrid Leary**		Electorate	Taieri	52	+14		
39	**Phil Twyford**		Electorate	Henderson	49	+10		
40	**Arena Williams**		Electorate	Manurewa	48	+8		
41	**Lemauga Lydia Sosene**		Electorate	Māngere	53	+12		
42	Kerrin Leoni			Tāmaki Makaurau	—	—		
43	Toni Boynton			Waiariki	39	−4		
44	Hannah Pia Baral			Upper Harbour	—	—		
45	Angela Roberts		(Former MP)	Whanganui	35	−10		
46	Estefania Muller-Pallarès			Whangaparāoa	55	+9		
47	Anahila Kanongata'a		(Former MP)	Papakura	34	−13		
48	Gary Payinda			Whangārei	—	—		
49	Alex Hedley			Napier	—	—		
50	Craig Renney			Wellington Bays	—	—		
51	George Hampton			Christchurch Central	41	−10		
52	Dominik Yanzick			Wigram	—	—		
53	Rory Paterson			West Coast-Tasman	—	—		
54	Ashleigh Latimer			Northland	—	—		
55	Rata Jamieson			Ilam	—	—		
56	Naresh Perinpanayagam				—	—		
57	Peter McDonald			Southland	—	—		
58	Amanda Clinton-Gohdes			New Plymouth	—	—		
59	Myra Williamson			Hamilton West	62	+3		
60	Kharag Singh			Takanini	66	+6		
61	Janice Lee			Invercargill	—	—		
62	Sam Collins			North Shore	—	—		
63	Sange Malama			Rangitata	—	—		
64	Rhieve Grey			Mount Maunganui	—	—		
65	Karl Severinsen			Rangitīkei	—	—		
66	Henrietta Hunkin-Tagaloa				—	—		
67	Fisher Wang			Rotorua	—	—		
68	Brendan McEnroe			East Coast Bays	—	—		
69	Campbell Matthews			Pakuranga	—	—		
70	David Pattemore			Taranaki-King Country	—	—		
71	Nathaniel Howe				—	—		

=== National Party ===
The National Party released its list on 8 August 2026. Chris Penk later withdrew his candidacy, and his Kaipara ki Mahurangi replacement Jessica Rowe was placed 68th on the list.

Rank	Name	Portrait	Incumbency	Contesting electorate	Previous rank	Change	Initial results	Later changes
1	**Christopher Luxon**		Electorate	Botany	1	0		
2	**Nicola Willis**		List		2	0		
3	**Chris Bishop**		Electorate	Hutt South	3	0		
4	**Simeon Brown**		Electorate	Pakuranga	9	+5		
5	**Erica Stanford**		Electorate	East Coast Bays	7	+2		
6	**Paul Goldsmith**		List	Epsom	5	−1		
7	**Louise Upston**		Electorate	Taupō	6	−1		
8	**Mark Mitchell**		Electorate	Whangaparāoa	11	+3		
9	**Gerry Brownlee**		List		14	+5		
10	**Todd McClay**		Electorate	Rotorua	12	+2		
11	**Tama Potaka**		Electorate	Hamilton West	24	+13		
12	**Matt Doocey**		Electorate	Waimakariri	8	−4		
13	**Simon Watts**		Electorate	North Shore	17	+4		
14	**Penny Simmonds**		Electorate	Invercargill	16	+2		
15	**Nancy Lu**		List		20	+5		
16	**Nicola Grigg**		Electorate	Selwyn	19	+3		
17	**James Meager**		Electorate	Rangitata	69	+52		
18	**Scott Simpson**		Electorate	Coromandel	55	+37		
19	**Cameron Brewer**		Electorate	Upper Harbour	62	+43		
20	**Mike Butterick**		Electorate	Wairarapa	61	+41		
21	**Stuart Smith**		Electorate	Kaikōura	56	+35		
22	Dale Stephens			Christchurch Central	29	+7		
23	Mahesh Muralidhar			Tāmaki	43	+20		
24	Katie Milne			West Coast-Tasman	—	—		
25	Angee Nicholas			Henderson	39	+14		
26	**Katie Nimon**		Electorate	Napier	22	−4		
27	**Tom Rutherford**		Electorate	Mount Maunganui	70	+43		
28	**Carl Bates**		Electorate	Whanganui	47	+19		
29	**Melissa Lee**		List	Mount Albert	13	−16		
30	**Dan Bidois**		Electorate	Northcote	60	+30		
31	**Suze Redmayne**		Electorate	Rangitīkei	21	−10		
32	**Dana Kirkpatrick**		Electorate	East Cape	44	+12		
33	**Carlos Cheung**		Electorate	Mount Roskill	48	+15		
34	**Grant McCallum**		Electorate	Northland	68	+34		
35	**Ryan Hamilton**		Electorate	Hamilton East	66	+31		
36	**Catherine Wedd**		Electorate	Tukituki	23	−13		
37	**Tim Costley**		Electorate	Kapiti	64	+27		
38	**Vanessa Weenink**		Electorate	Banks Peninsula	40	+2		
39	Rosemary Bourke			Māngere	32	−7		
40	Blair Cameron			Nelson	35	−5		
41	Kristine Asuncion			Dunedin	—	—		
42	**Barbara Kuriger**		Electorate	Taranaki-King Country	36	−6		
43	**Greg Fleming**		Electorate	Maungakiekie	65	+22		
44	**Rima Nakhle**		Electorate	Takanini	41	−3		
45	**David MacLeod**		Electorate	New Plymouth	67	+22		
46	**Miles Anderson**		Electorate	Waitaki	59	+13		
47	**Hamish Campbell**		Electorate	Ilam	63	+16		
48	**Tim van de Molen**		Electorate	Waikato	58	+10		
49	**Joseph Mooney**		Electorate	Southland	53	+4		
50	**Sam Uffindell**		Electorate	Tauranga	57	+7		
51	Emma Chatterton			Papakura	27	−24		
52	Ankit Bansal			Palmerston North	52	0		
53	Matthew French			Taieri	49	−4		
54	Candace Kinser			Auckland Central	—	—		
55	Coral Raukawa			Te Tai Hauāuru	—	—		
56	Tracy Summerfield			Wigram	37	−19		
57	Agnes Loheni		(Former MP)	Waitakere	25	−32		
58	Lalit Arya			Ōtāhuhu	—	—		
59	Matthew Evetts			Kenepuru	—	—		
60	Lloyd Budd			Whangārei	—	—		
61	Matthew Paul			Port Waikato	—	—		
62	Sunil Kumar			Glendene	—	—		
63	Karunā Muthu			Wellington Bays	51	−12		
64	Alexandra Davids			Christchurch East	—	—		
65	Ghouse Majeed			Manurewa	—	—		
66	Jonathan Pitts			Wellington North	—	—		
67	Zabeen Lateef			Remutaka	—	—		
68	Jessica Rowe			Kaipara ki Mahurangi	—	—		
69	Troy Elliott				—	—		
70	Robin Atwall				—	—		
71	Ash Nayyar				—	—		
72	Maria Sanson				—	—		

=== New Zealand First ===
New Zealand First released its list on 7 October 2026.

Rank	Name	Incumbency	Contesting electorate	Previous rank	Change	Initial results	Later changes
1	**Winston Peters**	List		1	0		
2	**Shane Jones**	List	Northland	2	0		
3	**Casey Costello**	List	Port Waikato	3	0		
4	**Mark Patterson**	List	Taieri	4	0		
5	Alfred Ngaro	(Former MP)	Glendene	(NewZeal: 1)	−4		
6	Michael Laws	(Former MP)	Waitaki	—	—		
7	Harete Hipango	(Former MP)	Whanganui	(National: 31)	+24		
8	Craig Stobo		Botany	—	—		
9	Taine Randell		Tukituki	—	—		
10	**Jenny Marcroft**	List	Kaipara ki Mahurangi	5	−5		
11	**Andy Foster**	List	Remutaka	7	−4		
12	**David Wilson**	List	Henderson	9	−3		
13	**Jamie Arbuckle**	List	Kaikōura	6	−7		
14	Jamie Cleine		West Coast-Tasman	—	—		
15	Tracey Coxhead		Mount Maunganui	—	—		
16	Ron Mark	(Former MP)	Wairarapa	—	—		
17	Jason Herrick		Southland	—	—		
18	Esther Tofilau-Tevaga		Manurewa	—	—		
19	Penny Gaylor		Kapiti	—	—		
20	Elliot Ikilei		Takanini	—	—		
21	Vicky Hau		Māngere	—	—		
22	Bernadette Soares		Upper Harbour	—	—		
23	Robert Cookson		Waikato	—	—		
24	Mark Arneil		Christchurch Central	23	−1		
25	Lee Smith		Taranaki-King Country	—	—		
26	Kym McDonald-King		Dunedin	—	—		
27	Martin Gummer		Epsom	—	—		
28	Te Kira Lawrence		Napier	—	—		
29	Daryl Habraken		Northcote	—	—		
30	Vincent Anderson		Coromandel	—	—		
31	Vince Cocurullo		Whangārei	—	—		
32	Sheldon Eden-Whaitiri		Mount Albert	—	—		
33	Steve Gibson		Rangitīkei	—	—		
34	Billy Brown		Rotorua	—	—		
35	Alister Boyce		Hutt South	—	—		
36	Keegan Langeveld		Maungakiekie	20	−16		
37	Bryce Park		Wigram	—	—		
38	Isaac Nicholson		Rangitata	—	—		
39	Gerald Warner		Wellington Bays	—	—		
40	Taylor Arneil		Wellington North	19	−21		
41	Nicola Laboyrie		Hamilton East	—	—		
42	Vaughan Taylor		East Coast Bays	—	—		
43	Kevin Stone		Hamilton West	26	−17		
44	Jackie Farrelly		Waimakariri	27	−17		
45	Shane Wiremu		Christchurch East	22	−23		
46	Elizabeth Mundt		Selwyn	—	—		
47	John Stringer		Banks Peninsula	—	—		
48	Jon Blackshaw		Kenepuru	—	—		
49	Nathan Walton		Ilam	—	—		
50	Murray Chong			—	—		

=== Te Pāti Māori ===
Te Pāti Māori announced their list on 4 October 2026. As part of their strategy of campaigning only for electorate votes in order to create an overhang, their list only contains the party's general secretary, Lance Norman.

Rank	Name	Incumbency	Contesting electorate	Previous rank	Change	Initial results	Later changes
1	Lance Norman			—	—		

== Other registered parties ==
=== Alliance ===
The Alliance released their list via Scoop on 7 October 2026.

Rank	Name	Incumbency	Contesting electorate	Previous rank	Change	Initial results	Later changes
1	Victor Billot		Dunedin	6	+5		
2	Anna Knight		Taieri	—	—		
3	Ethan Gullery		Christchurch East	—	—		
4	Sara Dyatlova–Murphy		West Coast-Tasman	—	—		
5	Kyle Turnbull		Banks Peninsula	—	—		
6	Victoria Ale		Wairarapa	—	—		
7	Kelly Campbell			—	—		
8	Josh Harford		Wellington North	—	—		
9	Courtney Fraser		Ilam	—	—		
10	Jesse Luke		Selwyn	—	—		
11	Joshua Moss		Palmerston North	—	—		
12	Jen Olsen			10	−2		
13	Quentin Findlay			—	—		
14	Greg Byrnes		Christchurch Central	—	—		
15	Peter Wilson			—	—		
16	Cory Aitken			—	—		
17	Brian Byas			—	—		

=== Animal Justice Party ===
The Animal Justice Party Aotearoa New Zealand list was released by the Electoral Commission on 9 October.

Rank	Name	Incumbency	Contesting electorate	Previous rank	Change	Initial results	Later changes
1	Robert McNeil		Glendene	1	0		
2	Danette Wereta			5	+3		
3	Lily Carrington		Northcote	8	+5		
4	Sandra Kyle		Whanganui	9	+5		
5	Brian Baker		Palmerston North	—	—		
6	Priyanka Deo		Mount Roskill	—	—		
7	Avalua Tavui		Manurewa	—	—		
8	Lynley Tulloch		Takanini	17	+9		
9	Caitlin Grattan		Mount Maunganui	14	+5		
10	Sam Connely		Tauranga	—	—		

=== Aotearoa Legalise Cannabis Party ===
The Aotearoa Legalise Cannabis Party released their list via their website.

Rank	Name	Incumbency	Contesting electorate	Previous rank	Change	Initial results	Later changes
1	Maki Herbert		Te Tai Tokerau	1	0		
2	Michael Appleby		Wellington North	2	0		
3	Jeff Lye		Northland	7	+4		
4	Paula Lambert		Christchurch East	4	0		
5	Christopher Manaia		Auckland Central	—	—		
6	Anntwinette Grumball		Invercargill	12	+6		
7	Blair Anderson		Christchurch Central	10	+3		
8	Tania Henare		Te Tai Tonga	—	—		
9	Romana Manz Manning		Tukituki	11	+2		
10	Adrian McDermott		Dunedin	14	+4		
11	Irinka Britnell			6	−5		
12	Russell Haynes			—	—		

=== Conservative Party NZ ===
The Conservative Party NZ released their list via Scoop on 30 September 2026.

Rank	Name	Incumbency	Contesting electorate	Previous rank	Change	Initial results	Later changes
1	Helen Houghton		Christchurch East	1	0		
2	Karl Thomas		Rangitata	3	+1		
3	Mel Libre			—	—		
4	Doug Lyell		Northland	—	—		
5	Marie Drury		Northcote	—	—		
6	Paul Deacon			4	−2		
7	Jonathan Marshall			—	—		
8	Amy Turner		Banks Peninsula	—	—		

=== Free Palestine ===
The Free Palestine Party list was released by the Electoral Commission on 9 October.

Rank	Name	Incumbency	Contesting electorate	Previous rank	Change	Initial results	Later changes
1	John Minto			—	—		
2	Deborah Ruawai			—	—		
3	Dale Frew			—	—		
4	Warren Brewer			—	—		
5	William Donald Alexander		Wigram	—	—		
6	Bryan Anthony Clearwater			—	—		

=== New Zealand Loyal ===
The New Zealand Loyal list was released by the Electoral Commission on 9 October.

Rank	Name	Incumbency	Contesting electorate	Previous rank	Change	Initial results	Later changes
1	Kelvyn Alp		Māngere	—	—		
2	Paul Nooroa Teio		Takanini	—	—		
3	Brenton Faithful		Whangaparāoa	—	—		
4	Alexander Hislop		West Coast-Tasman	—	—		
5	Kelly Blomfield			—	—		
6	Greer Young		Tauranga	—	—		
7	Julian Crawford		Nelson	—	—		
8	Leslie Sales		Banks Peninsula	—	—		
9	John Alcock		Ōtāhuhu	(Freedoms NZ: 10)	+1		
10	Pete Verhoeven		Northland	—	—		
11	Collin Blackman		Whangārei	—	—		
12	Allan Lind		East Coast Bays	—	—		
13	Gordon Wilson		Taupō	—	—		
14	Jason Smith		Rangitīkei	—	—		
15	Christine Fisher		Te Tai Tonga	—	—		
16	Barak Ford		Northcote	—	—		
17	Glenn Thompson		Christchurch East	—	—		

=== Opportunity Party ===
The Opportunity Party announced their list on 31 July 2026.

Rank	Name	Incumbency	Contesting electorate	Previous rank	Change	Initial results	Later changes
1	Qiulae Wong		Mount Albert	—	—		
2	Daniel Eb		Kaipara ki Mahurangi	—	—		
3	Jessica Hammond		Wellington North	6	+3		
4	Kayla Kingdon-Bebb		Wellington Bays	—	—		
5	Eden Skipper		Christchurch Central	—	—		
6	Jodie Kuntzsch		Nelson	—	—		
7	Sarah Lucas		New Plymouth	—	—		
8	David Bainbridge-Zafar		Dunedin	—	—		
9	Holly Knill		North Shore	—	—		
10	Pāpā Wharewera		Waiariki	—	—		
11	Bianca Beebe		Southland	—	—		
12	Romeo Tevaga		Upper Harbour	—	—		
13	Ben Wylie-van Eerd		Hutt South	11	−2		
14	Rachel Ward		Tukituki	—	—		
15	Naomi Pocock		Hamilton East	9	−6		
16	Helen Tait		Waitaki	—	—		
17	Cody Marsh		Northcote	—	—		
18	Adam Macrae-Martin		Ōtāhuhu	—	—		
19	Mark Roach		Waitakere	—	—		
20	Robert Mason		Kenepuru	—	—		
21	Luke Ross		Remutaka	—	—		
22	Michael Carter		Tauranga	—	—		
23	Derrick Paul		Maungakiekie	—	—		
24	Matt Shepherd		Wairarapa	—	—		
25	Ben Lane		Māngere	—	—		
26	Chee Khiang (CK) Sng		Kapiti	—	—		
27	Finn Liley		Rotorua	—	—		
28	Evan French		Glendene	—	—		
29	Jamie Attenborough		Mount Roskill	—	—		
30	Matthew Harris		Rangitata	—	—		
31	Sacha Haskell		Tāmaki	—	—		
32	Netra Ghimire		Palmerston North	—	—		
33	Cail Smith		East Cape	—	—		
34	Sam Plummer		Taupō	—	—		
35	Blair Smith		Hamilton West	—	—		
36	Johan Chang		Auckland Central	—	—		
37	Almo Wong		Henderson	—	—		
38	Adrian Mee		Selwyn	—	—		
39	Paul Jackson		Epsom	—	—		
40	Kevin Huang		Pakuranga	—	—		

=== Outdoors & Freedom Party ===
The NZ Outdoors & Freedom Party announced their list on 6 October 2026.

Rank	Name	Incumbency	Contesting electorate	Previous rank	Change	Initial results	Later changes
1	Sue Grey		West Coast-Tasman	(Freedoms NZ: 2)	+1		
2	Aly Cook			(Freedoms NZ: 6)	+4		
3	Barry Young		Wairarapa	—	—		
4	Hine Afeaki		Māngere	—	—		
5	Alistair Wait		Northland	—	—		
6	Donna Pokere-Phillips		Hamilton West	(Freedoms NZ: 4)	−2		
7	Alison Pavlovich			—	—		
8	Ray Cobb		Coromandel	—	—		
9	Keith Upson			—	—		
10	Bruce Dooley			—	—		
11	Liz Dotcom		Kaipara ki Mahurangi	—	—		
12	Cedric Backhouse		Rangitīkei	—	—		
13	David Cajar-Mueller		Christchurch East	—	—		
14	Daymond Goulder-Horobin			—	—		
15	Kevin McCracken		Rangitata	—	—		
16	Victoria Hoskin			—	—		
17	Noah Wakelam		Whangārei	—	—		

=== Te Tai Tokerau Party ===
The Te Tai Tokerau Party list was released by the Electoral Commission on 9 October.

Rank	Name	Incumbency	Contesting electorate	Previous rank	Change	Initial results	Later changes
1	Kyla Campbell-Kamariera			(Te Pāti Māori: 23)	+22		
2	Mariameno Kapa-Kingi	Electorate	Te Tai Tokerau	(Te Pāti Māori: 7)	+5		

=== Vision NZ ===
The Vision NZ list was released by the Electoral Commission on 9 October.

Rank	Name	Incumbency	Contesting electorate	Previous rank	Change	Initial results	Later changes
1	Hannah Tamaki		Papakura	(Freedoms NZ: 3)	+2		
2	Heker Robertson			(Freedoms NZ: 5)	+3		
3	Sawan Jerry		Epsom	—	—		
4	Karl Mokaraka		Ōtāhuhu	(Freedoms NZ: 23)	+19		
5	Naomi Maclean		Southland	(Freedoms NZ: 19)	+14		
6	Anne Williamson			—	—		

=== Women's Rights Party ===
The Women's Rights Party released their list via Scoop on 28 September 2026.

Rank	Name	Incumbency	Contesting electorate	Previous rank	Change	Initial results	Later changes
1	Jill Ovens			1	0		
2	Yvonne Van Dongen			—	—		
3	Hilary Oxley			—	—		
4	Ann Galloway			—	—		
5	Prue Hyman			5	0		
6	Kerry Neilson			—	—		
7	Sally Warren			—	—		
8	Francesca Holloway			—	—		
9	Sue Hoskins			8	−1		
10	Caroline Jamieson			—	—		
11	Sue Carnegie-Harding			—	—		
12	Louise Burnside			—	—		
13	Kathleen Lauderdale			11	−2		

== See also ==
- Candidates in the 2026 New Zealand general election by electorate
