= 55th New Zealand Parliament =

Future New Zealand parliamentary term

55th Parliament of New Zealand
←	54th Parliament	56th Parliament	→
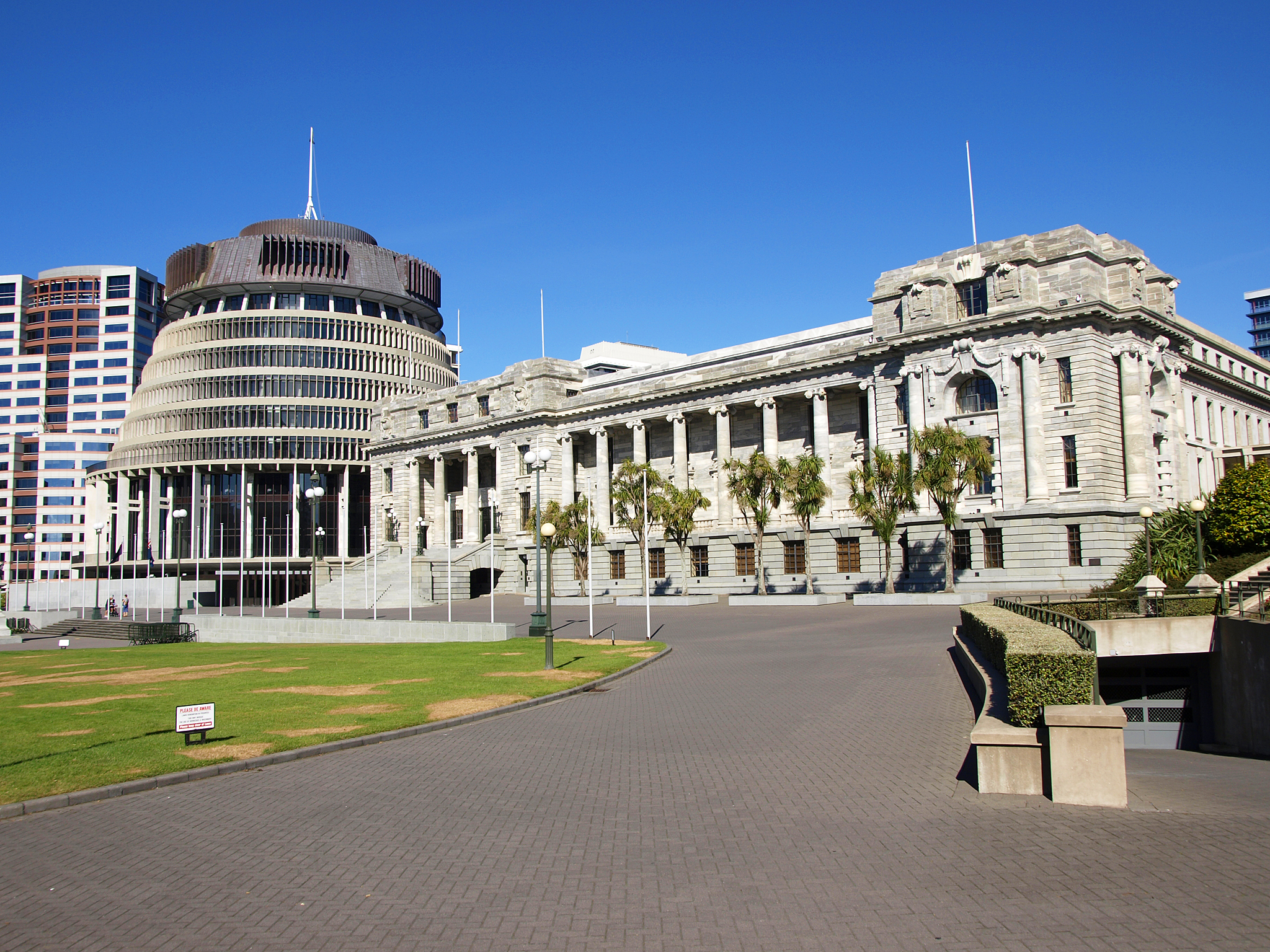
- Parliament House, Wellington

Overview
- Legislative body: New Zealand Parliament
- Term: 14 January 2027 – TBD
- Election: 2026 general election
- Government: TBD
- Opposition: TBD
- Website: www.parliament.nz

House of Representatives
- Members: 131
- Speaker of the House: TBD
- Leader of the House: TBD
- Prime Minister: TBD
- Leader of the Opposition: TBD

Sovereign
- Monarch: Charles III
- Governor-General: Cindy Kiro

Terms of the
New Zealand Parliament

1st | 2nd | 3rd | 4th | 5th
6th | 7th | 8th | 9th | 10th
11th | 12th | 13th | 14th | 15th
16th | 17th | 18th | 19th | 20th
21st | 22nd | 23rd | 24th | 25th
26th | 27th | 28th | 29th | 30th
31st | 32nd | 33rd | 34th | 35th
36th | 37th | 38th | 39th | 40th
41st | 42nd | 43rd | 44th | 45th
46th | 47th | 48th | 49th | 50th
51st | 52nd | 53rd | 54th | 55th

The 55th New Zealand Parliament is the future meeting of the legislature in New Zealand. It will open by proclamation on or before 14 January 2027, following the 2026 general election.

The Parliament will be elected using a mixed-member proportional representation (MMP) voting system. MPs represent 71 geographical electorates: 16 in the South Island, 48 in the North Island and 7 Māori electorates. The Electoral Act 1993 provides for the remaining seats to be elected from party lists using the Sainte-Laguë method to realise proportionality to an expected total of at least 120 MPs.

== Members ==
Members elected to the 55th Parliament (preliminary results)
Member	Party	Seat
Steve Abel	Green	List
Ginny Andersen	Labour	Hutt South
Miles Anderson	National	Waitaki
Carl Bates	National	Whanganui
Camilla Belich	Labour	List
Glen Bennett	Labour	List
Dan Bidois	National	Northcote
Cameron Brewer	National	Upper Harbour
Rachel Brooking	Labour	Dunedin
Simeon Brown	National	Pakuranga
Lloyd Budd	National	Whangārei
Mike Butterick	National	Wairarapa
Blair Cameron	National	Nelson
Hamish Campbell	National	Ilam
Kahurangi Carter	Green	List
Emma Chatterton	National	Papakura
Karen Chhour	ACT	List
James Christmas	ACT	List
Casey Costello	NZ First	List
Tim Costley	National	Ōtaki
Simon Court	ACT	List
Marama Davidson	Green	List
Reuben Davidson	Labour	Christchurch East
Matt Doocey	National	Waimakariri
Daniel Eb	Opportunity	List
Barbara Edmonds	Labour	Kenepuru
Aperahama Edwards	Te Pāti Māori	Te Tai Tokerau
Chris Flatt	Labour	List
Greg Fleming	National	Maungakiekie
Andy Foster	NZ First	List
Julie Anne Genter	Green	List
Nicola Grigg	National	Selwyn
Shanan Halbert	Labour	List
Ryan Hamilton	National	Hamilton East
Jessica Hammond	Opportunity	List
George Hampton	Labour	Christchurch Central
Paul Henry	ACT	List
Francisco Hernandez	Green	List
Harete Hipango	NZ First	List
Chris Hipkins	Labour	Remutaka
Andrew Hoggard	ACT	List
Willie Jackson	Labour	List
Shane Jones	NZ First	List
Oriini Kaipara	Te Pāti Māori	Tāmaki Makaurau
Kayla Kingdon-Bebb	Opportunity	List
Kingi Kiriona	Labour	List
Dana Kirkpatrick	National	East Cape
Jodie Kuntzsch	Opportunity	List
Barbara Kuriger	National	Taranaki-King Country
Michael Laws	NZ First	List
Ingrid Leary	Labour	Taieri
Sarah Lucas	Opportunity	List
Christopher Luxon	National	Botany
Cameron Luxton	ACT	List
Jo Luxton	Labour	List
Hūhana Lyndon	Green	List
David MacLeod	National	New Plymouth
Hana-Rawhiti Maipi-Clarke	Te Pāti Māori	Hauraki-Waikato
Jenny Marcroft	NZ First	List
Kieran McAnulty	Labour	List
Grant McCallum	National	Northland
Todd McClay	National	Rotorua
Laura McClure	ACT	List
Nicole McKee	ACT	List
Tracey McLellan	Labour	Banks Peninsula
James Meager	National	Rangitata
Ricardo Menéndez March	Green	List
Katie Milne	National	West Coast-Tasman
Mark Mitchell	National	Whangaparāoa
Antonia Modkova	ACT	List
Joseph Mooney	National	Southland
Mahesh Muralidhar	National	Tāmaki
Iain Murray	ACT	List
Rima Nakhle	National	Takanini
Rakesh Naidoo	Labour	List
Debbie Ngarewa-Packer	Te Pāti Māori	Te Tai Hauāuru
Alfred Ngaro	NZ First	List
Katie Nimon	National	Napier
Damien O'Connor	Labour	List
Rohan O'Neill-Stevens	Green	List
Parmjeet Parmar	ACT	List
Matthew Paul	National	Port Waikato
Tamatha Paul	Green	Wellington North
Mark Patterson	NZ First	List
Craig Pauling	Green	List
Winston Peters	NZ First	List
Lan Pham	Green	List
Tama Potaka	National	Waitaki
Willow-Jean Prime	Labour	List
Priyanca Radhakrishnan	Labour	List
Mananui Ramsden	Labour	Te Tai Tonga
Taine Randell	NZ First	List
Suze Redmayne	National	Rangitīkei
Craig Renney	Labour	Wellington Bays
Jessica Rowe	National	Kaipara ki Mahurangi
Tom Rutherford	National	Mount Maunganui
Jenny Salesa	Labour	Ōtāhuhu
Carmel Sepuloni	Labour	Glendene
David Seymour	ACT	Epsom
Eden Skipper	Opportunity	List
Penny Simmonds	National	Invercargill
Scott Simpson	National	Coromandel
Stuart Smith	National	Kaikōura
Lemauga Lydia Sosene	Labour	Māngere
Erica Stanford	National	East Coast Bays
Todd Stephenson	ACT	List
Craig Stobo	NZ First	List
Chlöe Swarbrick	Green	Auckland Central
Cushla Tangaere-Manuel	Labour	Ikaroa-Rāwhiti
Jan Tinetti	Labour	List
Teanau Tuiono	Green	List
Phil Twyford	Labour	Henderson
Sam Uffindell	National	Tauranga
Louise Upston	National	Taupō
Tangi Utikere	Labour	Palmerston North
Tim van de Molen	National	Waikato
Ayesha Verrall	Labour	List
Tania Waikato	Green	List
Rawiri Waititi	Te Pāti Māori	Waiariki
Vanushi Walters	Labour	Waitākere
Simon Watts	National	North Shore
Catherine Wedd	National	Tukituki
Helen White	Labour	Mount Albert
Arena Williams	Labour	Manurewa
Scott Willis	Green	List
David Wilson	NZ First	List
Qiulae Wong	Opportunity	List
Michael Wood	Labour	Mount Roskill
Megan Woods	Labour	List
Lawrence Xu-Nan	Green	List
Dominik Yanzick	Labour	Wigram

== See also ==
- Opinion polling for the 2026 New Zealand general election
- Politics of New Zealand
