= Mount Maunganui (disambiguation) =

Mount Maunganui is a suburb of Tauranga in New Zealand.

Mount Maunganui may also refer to:

- Mount Maunganui (mountain), the hill after which the suburb received its name
- Mt Maunganui (New Zealand electorate), an electorate to be used from the next general election
