= Antonia Modkova =

New Zealand politician and patent attorney

Antonia Modkova MP

Member of the New Zealand Parliament for ACT party list
- Incumbent
- Assumed office 7 November 2026

Personal details
- Born: 1990 or 1991 (age 34–35) Bulgaria
- Party: ACT New Zealand

Antonia Krassimirova Modkova (born 1990 or 1991) is a New Zealand politician, representing ACT New Zealand as a Member of Parliament since the 2026 New Zealand general election.

== Early life ==
Modkova was born in Bulgaria in 1990 or 1991 and moved to New Zealand with her parents as a two-year-old in the early 1990s. She graduated from ACG Senior College. In 2025 she completed a Master of Science degree at the University of Auckland, with a thesis titled Exploring Structure-Informed Information Retrieval for Legal Statutes, supervised by Michael Witbrock. Modkova is Director of Intellectual Property and Innovation at Soul Machines.

== Political career ==
New Zealand Parliament
Years	Term	Electorate	List	Party
2026–present	55th	List	13	ACT

Modkova contested Panmure-Ōtāhuhu in the 2023 election. She was twelfth on the national list.

Modkova contested Auckland Central in the 2026 election. She was thirteenth on the national list. Based on preliminary results, Modkova came fourth place in the Auckland Central electorate with 996 votes. She was elected to the New Zealand Parliament on the party list.
