= Eden Skipper =

New Zealand politician

Eden Skipper MP

Member of the New Zealand Parliament for Opportunity party list
- Incumbent
- Assumed office 7 November 2026

Personal details
- Born: 1997 or 1998 (age 27–28) Banks Peninsula, New Zealand
- Party: Opportunity

Eden Skipper (born 1997 or 1998) is a New Zealand politician who was elected to the New Zealand House of Representatives at the 2026 New Zealand general election from the Opportunity Party list.

== Early life ==
Skipper was born and raised in the Banks Peninsula region. He is of Māori origin. He belongs to the Ngāti Irakehu and Ngāti Mākoro iwi. He attended Lincoln High School and was Head Boy in 2015, alongside former Crusaders rugby player Antonio Shalfoon, before studying a Bachelor of Science in Statistics at the University of Canterbury

== Career ==
Skipper works in environmental restoration and indigenous development at the University of Canterbury. He previously lived and worked in London, England.

== Political career ==
New Zealand Parliament
Years	Term	Electorate	List	Party
2026–present	55th	List	5	Opportunity

In 2026, Skipper was announced as the Opportunity Party candidate for Christchurch Central. He was placed fifth on the party list. On 7 November, Skipper came in fifth place in Christchurch Central with 1,155 votes, based on preliminary results. He was elected to the New Zealand Parliament on the Opportunity party list.
