= Craig Stobo =

New Zealand politician and economist

Member of the New Zealand House of Representatives for New Zealand First party list
- Incumbent
- Assumed office 2026

Personal details
- Born: Craig Hamilton Stobo Oamaru, New Zealand
- Party: New Zealand First
- Website: Official website

Craig Hamilton Stobo is a New Zealand politician from New Zealand First. He was elected to the New Zealand House of Representatives at the 2026 New Zealand general election.

== Early life ==
Stobo was born and raised in Oamaru.

== Career ==
New Zealand Parliament
Years	Term	Electorate	List	Party
2026–present	55th	List	8	NZ First

Stobo was the chair of the Financial Markets Authority until May 2026. He was an advisor to the New Zealand School Property Agency.

Stobo is the New Zealand First candidate for Botany in the 2026 New Zealand general election and is 8th on the party list. On 7 November, Stobo came third place in the Botany contest, gaining 1,667 votes. He was elected to the New Zealand Parliament on the NZ First party list.
