= Sarah Lucas (politician) =

New Zealand politician

Sarah Lucas MP

Member of the New Zealand Parliament for Opportunity party list
- Incumbent
- Assumed office 7 November 2026

Personal details
- Party: Opportunity

Sarah Lucas is a New Zealand politician. She was elected to the New Zealand House of Representatives at the 2026 New Zealand general election from the Opportunity Party list.

== Early life ==
Lucas grew up in the United Kingdom. She has worked as a social worker and mental health manager, as well as in conservation strategy. While serving on the Inglewood Community Board she was chair of the community boards executive for Local Government New Zealand.

== Political career ==
New Zealand Parliament
Years	Term	Electorate	List	Party
2026–present	55th	List	7	Opportunity

In 2022 Lucas was elected to the Inglewood Community Board. She stood for mayor of New Plymouth in the 2025 New Plymouth District Council election, coming third. While a candidate she was targeted by misogynistic abuse.

In 2026, she was announced as the Opportunity Party candidate for New Plymouth. She was placed seventh on the party list. On 7 November, Lucas came third place in New Plymouth with 2,330 votes, based on preliminary results. She was elected to the New Zealand Parliament on the Opportunity party list.
