= Jodie Kuntzsch =

New Zealand politician

Jodie Kuntzsch MP
- Kuntzsch in 2026

Member of the New Zealand Parliament for Opportunity party list
- Incumbent
- Assumed office 7 November 2026

Personal details
- Born: 1980 or 1981 (age 44–45) United States
- Party: Opportunity
- Other political affiliations: New Zealand First (2016–17)
- Spouse: Volker Kuntsch
- Children: 6

Jodie Kuntzsch (born 1980 or 1981) is a American-born New Zealand politician. She was elected to the New Zealand House of Representatives at the 2026 New Zealand general election from the Opportunity Party list.

== Early life and career ==
Kuntzsch was born in Iowa in the United States and was educated at Luther College. She moved to New Zealand as a young adult originally working at a restaurant before working for the Ministry of Fisheries. She worked for 20 years in the seafood and aquaculture sectors, and is the CEO of Moananui, a company in the blue economy.

== Political career ==
New Zealand Parliament
Years	Term	Electorate	List	Party
2026–present	55th	List	6	Opportunity

Kuntzsch was previously a New Zealand First member from 2016 and attended their candidate college prior to the 2017 New Zealand general election. She did not stand as a candidate at the election.

In 2026, she was announced as the Opportunity Party candidate for Nelson. She was placed sixth on the party list. On 7 November, Kuntzsch came sixth place in Nelson with 1,083 votes, based on preliminary results. She was elected to the New Zealand Parliament on the party list.

== Personal life ==
She and her husband Volker Kuntsch have six children.
