= Dominik Yanzick =

New Zealand politician

Member of the New Zealand House of Representatives for Wigram
- Incumbent
- Assumed office 7 November 2026

Personal details
- Born: 1992 or 1993 (age 32–33)
- Party: Labour
- Education: St Kevin's College, Oamaru
- Website: Official website

Dominik Yanzick (born 1992 or 1993) is a New Zealand politician from the Labour Party. He was elected to the New Zealand House of Representatives at the 2026 New Zealand general election for Wigram.

== Early life and education ==
Yanzick, schooled at St Kevin's College, Oamaru was a promising youth athlete, excelling at rugby, a track and field, competing at various events at New Zealand secondary schools athletics competition. Following a significant oral injury where he lost a tooth, he hung up the cleats.

In 2011, Yanzick was awarded a North Otago Masonic Lodges scholarship from St Kevin's College, Oamaru. He is a tech consultant by profession.

An avid bird watcher, Yanzick reportedly sighted all 12 of New Zealands 'flightless fancies' over one summer, noted in Bird and Fern magazine as quite the achievement.

== Political career ==
New Zealand Parliament
Years	Term	Electorate	List	Party
2026–present	55th	Wigram	53	Labour

Yanzick stood as the New Zealand Labour Party's candidate for Wigram in the 2026 New Zealand general election. He was 53rd on the party list for Labour.

On 7 November, Yanzick retained Wigram for Labour by a margin of 1,935 votes and was elected into the New Zealand Parliament.
