= Kingi Kiriona =

New Zealand politician

Member of the New Zealand Parliament for Labour Party List
- Incumbent
- Assumed office 7 November 2026

Personal details
- Born: Dannevirke, New Zealand
- Party: Labour

Kingi Kiriona is a New Zealand politician from the Labour Party. He was elected to the New Zealand House of Representatives at the 2026 New Zealand general election as a list MP.

== Personal life ==
Kiriona was born and raised in Dannevirke. He is of Māori descent and his iwi are Ngāti Ruanui, Ngā Rauru, Ngāti Apa, and Ngāti Kahungunu.

== Journalistic career ==
Kiriona is a journalist by profession.

Kiriona is an expert in Te ao Māori and has worked in Māori language and cultural development. He is a winner of the Ngā Manu Kōrero. He is the founder of Māori education provider, TupuOra. He is also a composer. Kiriona is co-founder of Hamilton-based kapa haka group "Te Iti Kahurangi".

In 2025, Kingi was appointed to the Waitangi Tribunal. He also served as the Deputy Chair of the NZ Māori Broadcasting Funding Agency, Te Māngai Pāho, following three terms as Board Director of Whakaata Māori (formerly Māori Television). He was previously a journalist for TVNZ.

== Political career ==
New Zealand Parliament
Years	Term	Electorate	List	Party
2026–present	55th	List	22	Labour

Kiriona was announced as a candidate by leader Chris Hipkins in June 2026. Kiriona stood as the Labour candidate for Hauraki-Waikato in the 2026 New Zealand general election. It is a Māori electorate which contains parts of the Auckland Region and the Waikato Region. He stood against incumbent member Hana-Rawhiti Maipi-Clarke from the Maori Party. He was 22nd on the party list. On 7 November, Kiriona came second place in Hauraki-Waikato with 7,541 votes, based on preliminary results. He was elected to Parliament via the Labour Party list.
