= Tania Waikato =

New Zealand politician

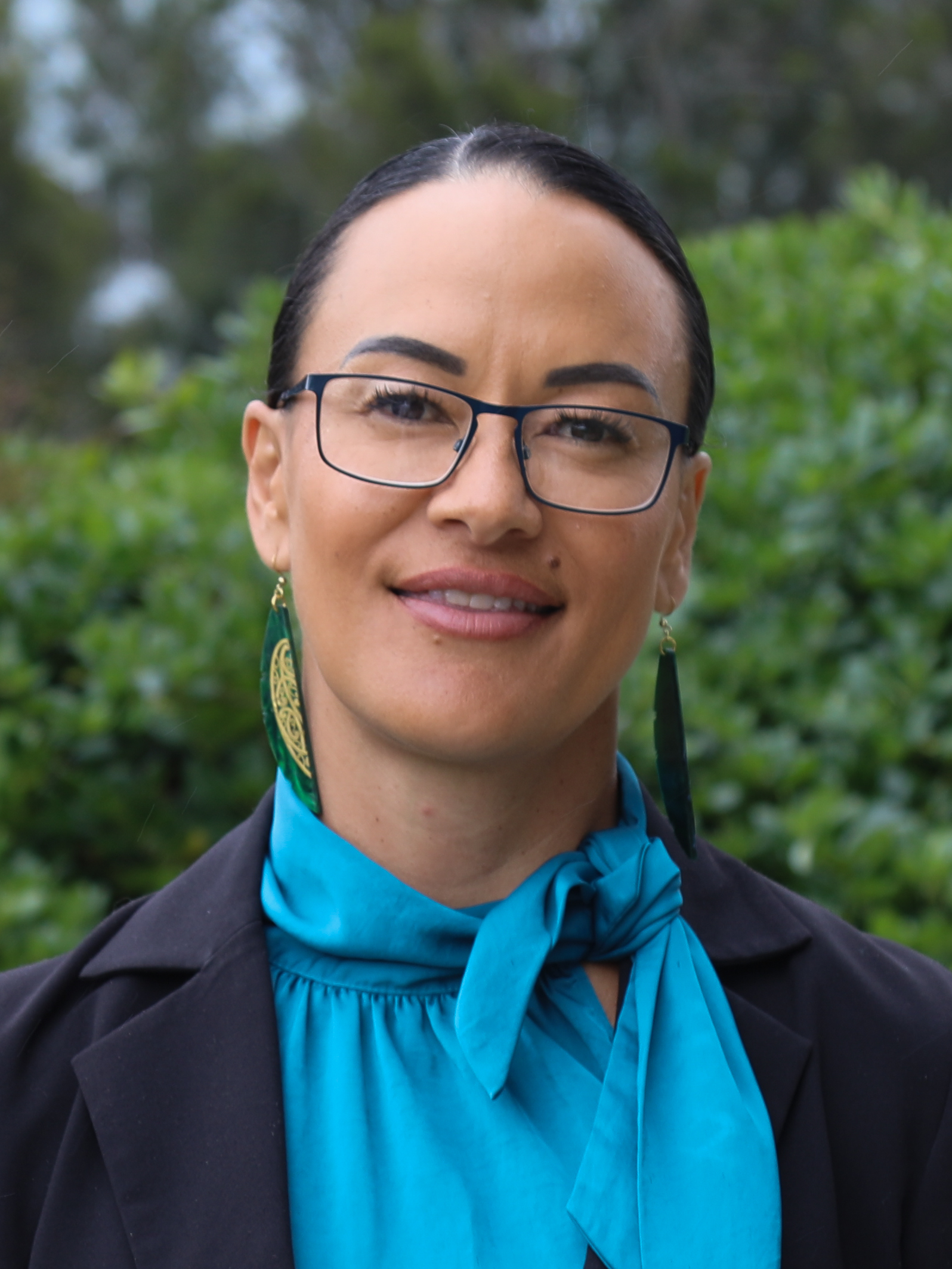
- Tania Waikato in 2026

Member of the New Zealand Parliament for Green party list
- Incumbent
- Assumed office 2026

Personal details
- Party: Green Party
- Education: University of Waikato; University of Auckland

Tania Waikato is a New Zealand politician. She was elected to the New Zealand House of Representatives at the 2026 New Zealand general election as a Green Party of Aotearoa New Zealand List MP.

== Early life ==
Waikato is of Māori descent. Her iwi are Ngāti Awa, Tūhoe, Ngāti Tūwharetoa, Ngāti Hine and Whakatōhea. She grew up in Te Teko, Bay of Plenty. She received two scholarships from the University of Auckland Law School, from where she graduated with a Master of Laws with First Class Honours.

== Career ==
Waikato is based in Tauranga. She is a Te Tiriti and constitutional lawyer. She is also a social media advocate.

== Political career ==
New Zealand Parliament
Years	Term	Electorate	List	Party
2026–present	55th	List	13	Green

She was previously a lawyer for Te Pāti Māori. Waikato opposed the Regulatory Standards Act 2025. She launched a calling upon the Government to cancel the Compass Group's school lunch contract.

Waikato later joined the Green Party. She is an advocate for Māori political engagement. She announced her candidacy for Parliament in December 2025. She stood in the 2026 New Zealand general election in the Waiariki electorate. She ran a campaign with her posing in bikinis to get young men to enrol, starting when just 53.4% of people in the 18 to 24 age group were enrolled.

On 7 November, Waikato came second place in the Waiariki electorate with 10,806 votes, based on preliminary results. She failed to unseat the incumbent Te Pāti Māori incumbent Rawiri Waititi, who won by a margin of 2,274 votes. Due to her high party list ranking, Waikato was elected to Parliament as a list MP.
