= Kayla Kingdon-Bebb =

New Zealand politician and environmental advocate

Kayla Kingdon-Bebb MP
- Kingdon-Bebb in 2026

CEO of WWF-New Zealand
- In office March 2023 – March 2026

Member of the New Zealand Parliament for Opportunity party list
- Incumbent
- Assumed office 7 November 2026

Personal details
- Born: 1985 or 1986 (age 39–40) British Columbia, Canada
- Party: Opportunity
- Education: University of Cambridge; Victoria University of Wellington

Kayla Kingdon-Bebb (born 1985 or 1986) is a Canadian-born New Zealand politician. She was elected to the New Zealand House of Representatives at the 2026 New Zealand general election from the Opportunity Party list.

== Early life ==
Kingdon-Bebb was born and raised in British Columbia, Canada, and moved to New Zealand in 2012.

== Early career ==
Kingdon-Bebb is a biodiversity advocate. She has engaged with indigenous communities across Oceania to tackle the effects of climate change. In 2024, she attended the Oceania First Voices Regional Forum. The event was held in Fiji.

Kingdon-Bebb was CEO of WWF New Zealand until March 2026. She has experience in environmental policy. She previously lived in the United Kingdom where she gained a Doctorate of Philosophy in Land Economy at Cambridge University.

== Political career ==
New Zealand Parliament
Years	Term	Electorate	List	Party
2026–present	55th	List	4	Opportunity

Prior to entering parliament Kingdon-Bebb worked for the New Zealand Ministry for the Environment and the Department of Conservation. In 2019 she was part of the Declaration Working Group that authored the He Puapua report.

In 2026, Kingdon-Bebb was announced as the Opportunity Party candidate for Wellington Bays. She was placed fourth on the party list. On 7 November, Kingdon-Bebb came fourth place in Wellington Bays with 2,115 votes, based on preliminary results. She was elected to the New Zealand Parliament on the party list.

== Views and positions ==
Kingdon-Bebb has described climate change as a "really personal topic" due to her career in environmental policy and advocacy. During the launch of the Members of Parliament Climate Consensus report at Parliament on 19 November 2026, she attributed her decision to stand as an Opportunity Party candidate to the National-led coalition government's alleged "systemic dismantling of our Zero Carbon Act framework." Kingdon-Bebb criticised ACT New Zealand leader David Seymour for voting against the legislation in 2019.

== Personal life ==
She met her husband Matt O'Connor while studying at Cambridge.
