= Iain Murray (politician) =

New Zealand politician

Iain Murray MP

Member of the New Zealand Parliament for ACT party list
- Incumbent
- Assumed office 2026

Personal details
- Party: ACT New Zealand

Iain Murray is a New Zealand politician, representing ACT New Zealand as a member of Parliament since the 2026 New Zealand general election. He is a teacher and has been principal for a number of schools.

== Professional career ==
Murray worked in education for over a decade, serving as principal to Hornby High School, Westland High School, Cheviot Area School, and Emmanuel Christian School in Christchurch. Murray was employed as an executive principal in Thailand for one year.

== Political career ==
New Zealand Parliament
Years	Term	Electorate	List	Party
2026–present	55th	List	11	ACT

Murray was announced as ACT's candidate for Selwyn on 31 May 2026. When ACT announced their list on 13 September, Murray was placed 11th. On 7 November, Murray came fifth place in Selwyn, with 1,562 votes based on provisional results. He was elected to the New Zealand Parliament on the ACT party list.
