= Angee Nicholas =

New Zealand National Party politician (born 1993 or 1994)

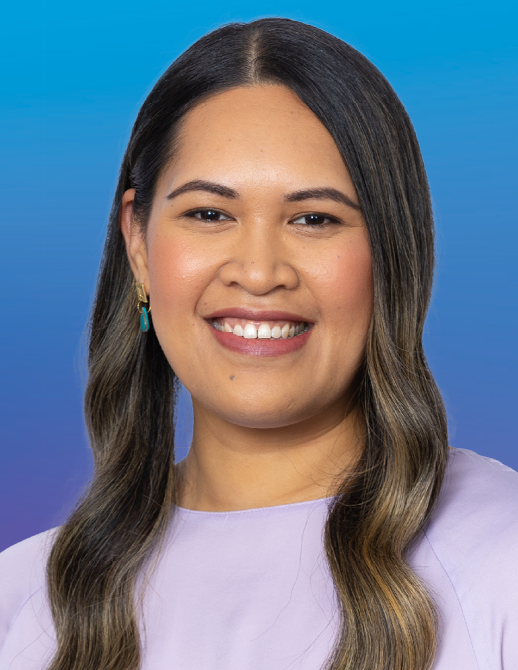
- Nicholas in 2023

Personal details
- Born: 1993 or 1994 (age 31–32) Rarotonga, Cook Islands
- Party: National
- Education: Auckland University of Technology

Angee Ngatokoono Nicholas (born 1993 or 1994) is a New Zealand lawyer and politician.

== Early life and career ==
Nicholas was born in Rarotonga in 1993 or 1994. She moved to New Zealand as a child, growing up in Te Atatū and attending Ranui Primary School and St Dominic's Catholic College. She went on to receive a Bachelor of Laws from the Auckland University of Technology, and worked for some National Party politicians in their non-Parliament offices, including Nikki Kaye. Nicholas then worked as an in-house lawyer for the Pacific investigation portion of the Royal Commission of Inquiry into Abuse in Care. Nicholas has also worked as a company director, and as owner/operator of her family's Auckland-based security firm.

== Political career ==
On 11 December 2022, Nicholas was announced as the National Party candidate for Te Atatū in the 2023 New Zealand general election. The preliminary result on election night showed Nicholas to have received 11,171 votes, ahead of incumbent Labour MP Phil Twyford by 30. If elected, Nicholas would have been National's only Pasifika MP and she expressed interest in holding the position of Minister for Pacific Peoples. The official result showed that Twyford retained the electorate by 131 votes. Nicholas had been placed at 39th on the party list, too low to be returned as a list MP.

Nicholas was selected as National's candidate for the new electorate of Henderson in the 2026 general election. She was ranked 25th on the National Party list. On 7 November, Nicholas came second place in Henderson, gaining 7,751 votes based on preliminary results. Based on preliminary results, no National Party MPs were elected to Parliament in 2026 through the party list, with all 42 MPs winning electorates.
