= Chris Flatt =

New Zealand politician

Member of the New Zealand Parliament for Labour Party List
- Incumbent
- Assumed office 7 November 2026

Personal details
- Party: Labour
- Profession: Trade unionist

Chris Flatt is a New Zealand trade unionist and politician from the Labour Party. He was elected to the New Zealand House of Representatives at the 2026 New Zealand general election as a List MP.

== Early life and career ==
Flatt was raised in Papatoetoe by parents who had emigrated to New Zealand in the 1960s. He is the son of an Air New Zealand freight loading worker and a bank teller. He has described the stable terms and conditions of his parents jobs as having "really set us up as a family." As a young man he worked a summer job at a distribution centre in 1990 and 1991, where he observed the effects of the Employment Contracts Act on overtime and penal rates. He holds two degrees from the University of Waikato: a social science degree in industrial relations and politics, and a law degree. While studying law he was taught by Margaret Wilson, who later became a Member of Parliament and was then dean of the law school. He also spent a year studying in Finland.

Flatt is a lawyer by profession. He began his professional career as an employment lawyer at Chapman Tripp in Auckland before moving to Sydney, where he worked as an employment lawyer and then spent five years representing the Electrical Trades Union. In that role he helped lead opposition to labour-law reforms introduced by the Howard government; he has said he was motivated by concern that a low-wage model in Australia would harm New Zealand. He later returned to New Zealand in the final period of Helen Clark's Labour government and took a position with the New Zealand Council of Trade Unions.

He has been the National Secretary of the NZ Dairy Workers Union - Te Runanga Waiū (DWU) since 2012.

== Political career ==
New Zealand Parliament
| Years | Term | Electorate | List | Party |
|---|---|---|---|---|
| 2026–present | 55th | List | 20 | Labour |

Flatt was the General Secretary of the New Zealand Labour Party for three years. He endorsed Andrew Little for Labour Leader in Little's successful 2014 leadership bid. Until 2026 he was the Affiliates Vice-President on the New Zealand Council of the Labour Party.

Flatt was the Labour candidate for Taupō in the 2026 New Zealand general election. In his candidacy, he emphasised energy reform as important for job sustainability, along with infrastructure, tourism management, economic diversification beyond dairy, and changes to industrial laws including pay equity, fair pay agreements, the Employment Relations Act, health and safety provisions, and the Holidays Act. During his 2026 campaign he stated he noticed local job losses were contributing to New Zealand's brain drain and advocated for the need for New Zealanders to stay in the country.

On 7 November, Flatt came second place in Taupo with 13,052 votes, based on preliminary results. He was elected to Parliament on the Labour Party list.

== Personal life ==
Flatt lives in Cambridge.

Party political offices
| Preceded by Mike Smith | General Secretary of the Labour Party; 2008–2012 | Succeeded by Tim Barnett |
