= Kelston (New Zealand electorate) =

- Single-member general constituency for the New Zealand House of Representatives
- Formation: 2014
- Region: Auckland
- Character: Suburban
- Term: 3 years

Member for Kelston

Kelston was a New Zealand parliamentary electorate that returned one member to the House of Representatives. The current MP for Kelston is Labour's Carmel Sepuloni, who has held the electorate since its creation in 2014. The electorate was abolished ahead of the 2026 general election.

== Population centres ==
Kelston is located in an area in Auckland south-west of Waitematā Harbour covering part of Te Atatū South, the suburbs of Glen Eden, Sunnyvale, Glendene, Kelston, New Lynn, and Avondale, part of Mt Albert and the suburb of Waterview, with the name coming from one of its component suburbs.

== History ==
Kelston was proposed in the 2013/14 electorate boundary review and confirmed by the Electoral Commission on 17 April 2014. The increase in population in the Auckland region as recorded in the 2013 census meant an extra electorate was required to keep all electorates within five percent of their quota. To accommodate an extra electorate the Electoral Commission abolished Waitakere and established two new electorates, namely Kelston and Upper Harbour.

The Kelston electorate took over parts of the Te Atatū, New Lynn, Mount Albert and Waitakere electorates. The first three electorates were all safe Labour electorates while Waitakere was marginal; National's Paula Bennett won the electorate by just nine votes in 2011 from Labour's Carmel Sepuloni. Subsequently, Kelston was regarded as a safe Labour electorate. Labour selected Sepuloni as its candidate for the 2014 general election, and she won the election with a majority of over 5,000 votes to National's Chris Penk.

The 2025 boundary review saw the reconfiguration of electorates in West Auckland resulting in the disestablishment of Te Atatū, Kelston and New Lynn. Most of the population of Kelston has been redistributed to the new electorates of Glendene and Waitakere.

=== Members of Parliament ===
Unless otherwise stated, all MPs' terms began and ended at general elections.

Key Labour

Election	Winner
2014 election	Carmel Sepuloni
2017 election	Carmel Sepuloni
2020 election	Carmel Sepuloni
2023 election	Carmel Sepuloni
(Electorate abolished in 2026; see Glendene)

=== List MPs ===
Members of Parliament elected from party lists in elections where that person also unsuccessfully contested the Kelston electorate. Unless otherwise stated, all MPs' terms began and ended at general elections.

Key Green

Election	
2023 election	Golriz Ghahraman (Note: Ghahraman resigned from Parliament on 18 January 2024)

== Election results ==
=== 2023 election ===
2023 general election: Kelston
Notes:	Blue background denotes the winner of the electorate vote. Pink background denotes a candidate elected from their party list. Yellow background denotes an electorate win by a list member, or other incumbent. A ✓ or ✗ denotes status of any incumbent, win or lose respectively.						
Party	Candidate	Votes	%	±%	Party votes	%	±%
Labour	✓ Carmel Sepuloni	14,413	43.71	−19.09	12,460	37.05	−24.80
National	Ruby Schaumkel	10,017	30.38	+11.93	10,442	31.04	+13.90
Green	Golriz Ghahraman	3,777	11.45	+4.76	4,709	14.00	+5.80
ACT	Jacob Curran	1,774	5.38	+2.00	1,990	5.91	+1.59
NZ First	Anne Degia-Pala	1,142	3.46	+1.83	1,580	4.69	+2.13
Te Pāti Māori	Jacqui Harema	679	2.05	—	591	1.75	+1.24
DemocracyNZ	Leao Tildsley	416	1.26	−0.42	97	0.28	–
New Conservative	Alister Hood	219	0.66	−1.02	70	0.20	−1.15
Opportunities					650	1.93	+0.79
NewZeal					267	0.79	+0.49
NZ Loyal					238	0.70	-
Legalise Cannabis					125	0.37	±0.00
Freedoms NZ					93	0.27	–
Animal Justice					56	0.16	–
Women's Rights					30	0.08	–
Leighton Baker Party					12	0.03	–
New Nation					12	0.03	–
Informal votes		533			208		
Total valid votes		32,970			33,630		
Labour hold	Majority	4,396	13.33	−33.01			

=== 2020 election ===
2020 general election: Kelston
Notes:	Blue background denotes the winner of the electorate vote. Pink background denotes a candidate elected from their party list. Yellow background denotes an electorate win by a list member, or other incumbent. A ✓ or ✗ denotes status of any incumbent, win or lose respectively.						
Party	Candidate	Votes	%	±%	Party votes	%	±%
Labour	✓ Carmel Sepuloni	22,177	62.80	+8.63	22,081	61.85	+11.67
National	Bala Beeram	6,517	18.45	−12.26	6,121	17.14	−15.68
Green	Jessamine Fraser	2,365	6.69	+0.29	2929	8.20	+1.50
ACT	Matthew Percival	1,195	3.38	—	1543	4.32	+3.97
New Conservative	Leao Tildsley	594	1.68	+0.99	484	1.35	+1.06
NZ First	Anne Degia-Pala	576	1.63	−3.10	915	2.56	−3.99
Legalise Cannabis	Jeff Lye	425	1.20	+0.07	135	0.37	+0.04
Advance NZ	Maureen Kumeroa	288	0.81	—	294	0.82	—
ONE	Faye Lavaka Tangipa	177	0.50	—	109	0.30	—
Trump New Zealand	Kevin Brett	57	0.16				
Social Credit	Jason Jobsis	33	0.50	—	14	0.03	+0.02
Opportunities					408	1.14	−0.41
Māori Party					185	0.51	+0.01
TEA					61	0.17	—
Vision NZ					20	0.05	—
Outdoors					14	0.03	—
Sustainable NZ					13	0.03	—
Heartland					4	0.01	—
Informal votes		908			367		
Total valid votes		35,312			35,697		
Labour hold	Majority	15,660	44.34	+20.88			

=== 2017 election ===
2017 general election: Kelston
Notes:	Blue background denotes the winner of the electorate vote. Pink background denotes a candidate elected from their party list. Yellow background denotes an electorate win by a list member, or other incumbent. A ✓ or ✗ denotes status of any incumbent, win or lose respectively.						
Party	Candidate	Votes	%	±%	Party votes	%	±%
Labour	✓ Carmel Sepuloni	16,789	54.17	+3.27	15,982	50.18	+8.05
National	Bala Beeram	9,520	30.71	−2.09	10,456	32.83	−0.51
Green	Nicola Smith	1,984	6.40	−0.52	2,133	6.70	−4.04
NZ First	Anne Degia-Pala	1,467	4.73	+0.40	2,087	6.55	−1.90
Legalise Cannabis	Jeff Lye	350	1.13	+0.11	106	0.33	−0.02
Māori Party	Cinnamon Whitlock	288	0.93	—	159	0.50	+0.19
Conservative	Warren Knott	213	0.69	−1.38	91	0.29	−2.67
Opportunities					494	1.55	—
ACT					112	0.35	−0.65
People's Party					45	0.14	—
Mana Party					24	0.08	—
United Future					14	0.04	−0.12
Outdoors					11	0.03	—
Internet					9	0.03	—
Ban 1080					7	0.02	−0.02
Democrats					1	0.01	−0.02
Informal votes		385			120		
Total valid votes		30,996			31,851		
Labour hold	Majority	7,269	23.46	+5.36			

=== 2014 election ===
2014 general election: Kelston
Notes:	Blue background denotes the winner of the electorate vote. Pink background denotes a candidate elected from their party list. Yellow background denotes an electorate win by a list member, or other incumbent. A ✓ or ✗ denotes status of any incumbent, win or lose respectively.						
Party	Candidate	Votes	%	±%	Party votes	%	±%
Labour	Carmel Sepuloni	15,091	50.90		12,934	42.13	
National	Chris Penk	9,724	32.80		9,924	32.32	
Green	Ruth Irwin	2,052	6.92		3,298	10.74	
NZ First	Anne Degia-Pala	1,283	4.33		2,595	8.45	
Conservative	Paul Sommer	613	2.07		910	2.96	
Legalise Cannabis	Jeff Lye	301	1.02		108	0.35	
ACT	Bruce Haycock	267	0.90		308	1.00	
Internet	Roshni Sami	234	0.79				
United Future	Jason Woolston	82	0.28		48	0.16	
Internet Mana					432	1.41	
Māori Party					94	0.31	
Civilian					15	0.05	
Ban 1080					13	0.04	
Democrats					8	0.03	
Focus					7	0.02	
Independent Coalition					7	0.02	
Informal votes		415			179		
Total valid votes		30,062			30,880		
Turnout		30,810	72.71				
Labour win new seat	Majority	5,367	18.10				
