= Blair Cameron =

New Zealand National Party politician

Blair Cameron MP
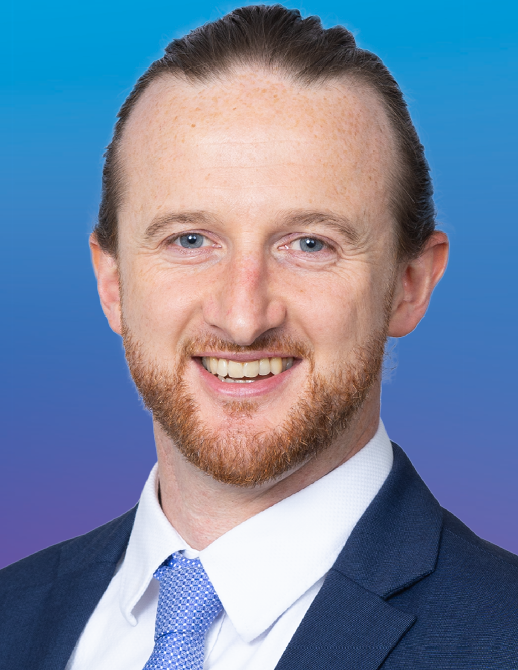
- Cameron in 2023

Member of the New Zealand Parliament for Nelson
- Incumbent
- Assumed office 7 November 2026
- Preceded by: Rachel Boyack

Personal details
- Born: 1990 or 1991 (age 35–36) New Zealand
- Party: National

Blair Cameron (born 1990/1991) is a New Zealand researcher and political candidate. He ran as the New Zealand National Party's candidate in Nelson during the 2023 and 2026 New Zealand general elections. While Cameron was narrowly defeated by New Zealand Labour Party candidate Rachel Boyack in 2023, he unseated her in 2026.

== Early life and career ==
Cameron grew up in rural Canterbury outside Methven, where his mother was a schoolteacher and his father was a barman at the working men's club. Cameron was schooled in Highbank, and at Mount Hutt College. At the age of sixteen, he was awarded a scholarship to study at Li Po Chun United World College. He gained a Bachelor of Arts in International Relations from Brown University in the United States.

Cameron has worked in research positions at Princeton University, the International Monetary Fund and the World Bank. His work for the World Bank involved researching how governments could be made less corrupt.

He returned to New Zealand in 2020, settling in Nelson where his mother had moved.

== Political career ==
New Zealand Parliament
| Years | Term | Electorate | List | Party |
|---|---|---|---|---|
| 2026–present | 55th | Nelson | 41 | National |

Cameron was selected by the National Party to contest the Nelson electorate at the 2023 general election. He was 35th on the party list. His campaign focused on Nelson infrastructure and health services, including the state of Nelson hospital. On election night it appeared Cameron would be elected with a 54-vote margin over incumbent Labour Party MP Rachel Boyack, but the official result showed Boyack retaining the seat by 29 votes. The National Party sought a judicial recount which confirmed Boyack's win by a margin of 26 votes.

In the 2026 general election, Cameron won the Nelson electorate on November 6, unseating incumbent MP Rachel Boyack with a 1,210 vote margin, although special votes are still to be counted. He was ranked 40th on the National Party list.

== Personal life ==
Cameron enjoys kayaking, tramping, rugby and racing.
