= Rakesh Naidoo =

New Zealand politician

Rakesh Naidoo MNZM MP
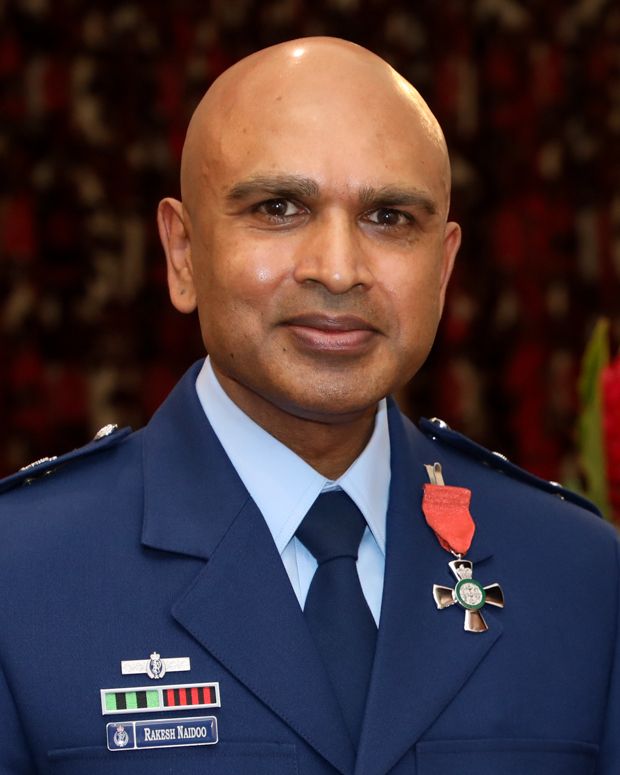
- Naidoo in 2023

Member of the New Zealand Parliament for Labour party list
- Incumbent
- Assumed office 7 November 2026

Personal details
- Born: South Africa
- Party: Labour

Rakesh Sharanund Naidoo MNZM is a New Zealand politician and former police Superintendent. He was elected to the New Zealand House of Representatives at the 2026 New Zealand general election from the New Zealand Labour Party list.

== Early life ==
Naidoo was born and raised in South Africa, moving to India when he was 19. He lived in Washington, D.C. before migrating to New Zealand in 2001. He attended the Royal New Zealand Police College. Naidoo was the first Asian person to attain the rank of Inspector with the New Zealand Police, doing so in 2012. He served as the ethnic, iwi and communities relationships manager and was a strategic advisor to Race Relations Commissioner Susan Devoy. He was promoted to the rank of Superintendent in 2021.

Naidoo was made a Member of the New Zealand Order of Merit for services to the New Zealand Police and ethnic communities in the 2023 Birthday and Coronation Honours.

== Political career ==
New Zealand Parliament
Years	Term	Electorate	List	Party
2026–present	55th	List	13	Labour

Naidoo was revealed as the Labour Party's highest-ranking new candidate when they announced their list for the 2026 New Zealand general election on 8 June 2026. He was a list-only candidate, not contesting an electorate, and his placement of 13th effectively guaranteed his election. Police Commissioner Richard Chambers criticised Naidoo for not earlier disclosing his intention to stand as a Labour candidate. Chambers said that his candidacy posed a conflict of interest, making it untenable for him to continue serving as a senior Police executive. Chambers also confirmed that the Police would conduct an investigation into whether Naidoo had shared any sensitive information during the time he was being courted by Labour. Labour leader Chris Hipkins defended Naidoo's candidacy, and Labour's police spokesperson Ginny Andersen accused Police Minister Mark Mitchell of instructing Chambers to criticise Naidoo, saying that Mitchell violated the Police's independence. An open letter supporting Naidoo was signed by 23 people involved in work with migrants and refugees, including former Race Relations Commissioners Gregory Fortuin and Susan Devoy, and criminal justice advocate Kim Workman. A third former Race Relations Commissioner, Joris de Bres, also voiced his support on social media. Naidoo's manager, Assistant Commissioner Tim Anderson, later apologised, as Naidoo had notified him earlier than Chambers claimed, and before he had made a final decision to stand for election.

During the 2026 general election held on 7 November, Naidoo was elected into the New Zealand Parliament on the Labour Party list.

== Personal life ==
As of 2022, Naidoo was dating human rights advocate Vanisa Dhiru.
