= Lan Pham =

New Zealand politician and freshwater ecologist

Lan Pham MP
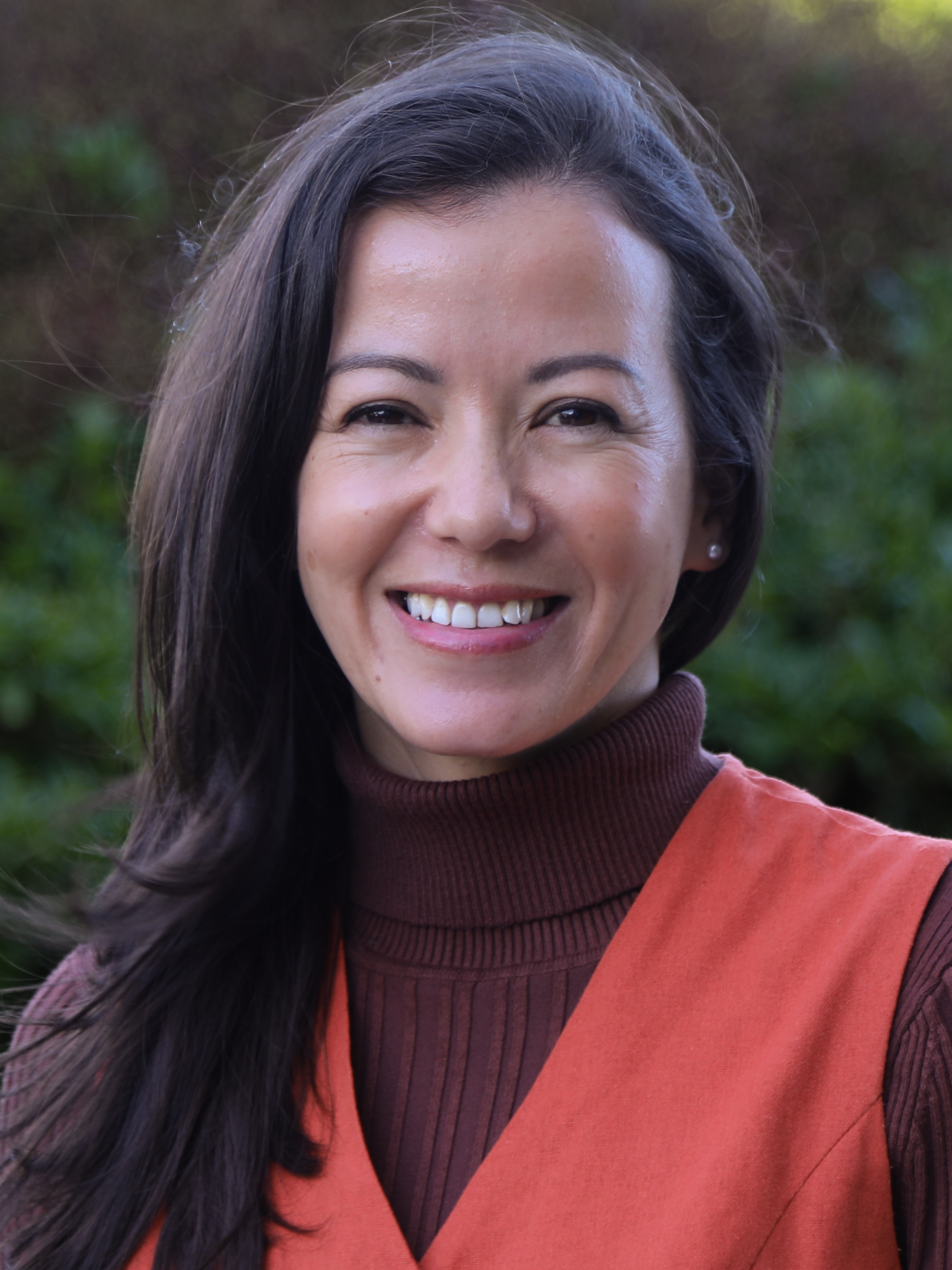
- Pham in 2026

Member of the New Zealand Parliament for Green party list
- Incumbent
- Assumed office 14 October 2023

Canterbury Regional Councillor for Christchurch Central Christchurch (2016–2019)
- In office October 2016 – October 2022

Personal details
- Born: 1985 or 1986 (age 40–41)
- Party: Green
- Other political affiliations: The People's Choice (2016–2019)
- Education: Massey (BSc); Otago (MSc)
- Occupation: Ecologist
- Pham's voice recorded July 2024

Ngoc-Lan Thi Pham MP (born 1985 or 1986) is a New Zealand politician and ecologist. She has served as a list Member of Parliament for the Green Party of Aotearoa New Zealand since 2023. She previously served as a regional councillor for Environment Canterbury from 2016 to 2022.

== Early life and career ==
Pham was born in 1985 or 1986 to a Catholic mother of English and Irish ancestry and a Buddhist Vietnamese father. Pham's mother was a supporter of the Alliance and Labour. She grew up in Brooklyn, Wellington and attended Sacred Heart Cathedral School and St Mary's College, Wellington. She moved to Palmerston North to study and graduated with a Bachelor of Science in ecology from Massey University in 2009. Pham moved to the South Island to work for the Department of Conservation in freshwater ecology, which prompted an interest in freshwater fish. She completed a Master of Science in ecology at the University of Otago in 2014. Pham's professional specialisation is in the rivers of Canterbury.

== Political career ==
=== Local government ===
Pham was elected to the Canterbury Regional Council, also known as Environment Canterbury, at the 2016 New Zealand local elections. She ran her campaign while working on Raoul Island. She stood as a candidate for the four-member Christchurch constituency under the ticket The People's Choice–Independent and received the most votes of the eight candidates. In the 2019 elections she ran with Axel Downard-Wilke on the ticket The Common Good, choosing not to run with The People's Choice. She was re-elected to the council in the new Christchurch Central constituency. Pham has been a resource management commissioner, and a freshwater commissioner at the Office of the Chief Freshwater Commissioner.

=== Member of Parliament ===
New Zealand Parliament
Years	Term	Electorate	List	Party
2023–2026	54th	List	6	Green
2026–present	54th	List	6	Green

Pham was selected by the Green Party of Aotearoa New Zealand to contest the Banks Peninsula electorate at the 2023 New Zealand general election. She was placed at number six on the national party list. During the 2023 election, Pham came third place in the Banks Peninsula electorate but was elected to Parliament on the party list.

In late November 2023, Pham assumed the Green Party's environment, water services, biosecurity, emergency management and recovery, land information, statistics, tourism and hospitality, and customs spokesperson portfolios.

In late May 2026, Pham's member's bill seeking to ban mining on public conservation land was drawn from Parliament's private ballot system. Wayne Henry-Scott of the Aggregate and Quarry Association expressed concern about the broad definition of mining under the bill.

During the 2026 general election, Pham confirmed she would contest the Kenepuru electorate. She was ranked sixth on the Green Party list. On 7 November, Pham came third place with 2,587 votes based on preliminary results. She was re-elected to Parliament on the Green Party list.

== Personal life ==
Pham has two children with her husband Emerson. In 2024, Pham and her family sold their home in Woolston, Christchurch and moved to Wellington to spend more time together.
