= Henderson (electorate) =

Map showing Henderson electorate boundaries first used in 2026

Interactive map of boundaries at the 2026 general election

Henderson is a New Zealand electorate, returning a single member to the New Zealand House of Representatives. A former electorate from 1969 to 1978 and again from 1993 to 1996, it has been recreated with new boundaries for the 2026 general election.

== Population centres ==
Henderson is based in West Auckland and provides representation for the communities of Henderson, Henderson Valley, Lincoln, Massey, Rānui and Swanson.

The electorate is roughly triangular and borders the electorates of Kaipara ki Mahurangi and Upper Harbour in the north, Glendene in the east, and Waitakere on the southwest.

== History ==
=== 1969 to 1978 ===
Henderson was first created through the 1967 electoral redistribution which saw the creation of three additional electorates in the North Island and one additional electorate in the South Island. One of those new electorates was Henderson, which took over most of Waitakere's area. These changes came into effect with the 1969 election. Localities covered by the electorate included Henderson, Oratia, Waiatarua, Parau, Huia, and Piha. In the 1972 electoral redistribution, there were slight boundary adjustments with the adjoining Waitemata and New Lynn electorates.

Henderson existed for three electoral cycles, all of which were won by Martyn Finlay of the Labour Party, who had represented the former Waitakere electorate since 1963. Henderson was abolished again through the 1977 electoral redistribution. Much of its population were transferred to the restored Waitakere electorate.

=== 1993 to 1996 ===
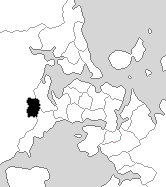
Henderson electorate boundaries between 1993 and 1996

Henderson was recreated for the 1993 election and existed for one parliamentary term. In 1996, the first mixed-member proportional (MMP) election, the area was absorbed into the new Waipareira electorate.

=== From 2026 ===
The 2025 boundary review saw the reconfiguration of electorates in West Auckland resulting in the disestablishment of Te Atatū, Kelston and New Lynn. The restored Henderson electorate took population from parts of Te Atatū (Swanson, Rānui, Western Heights, Henderson and Lincoln), Upper Harbour (Massey) and Kaipara ki Mahurangi (Birdwood Heights). The original proposal for the name of the electorate was Rānui.

=== Members of Parliament ===
Key

Labour NZ First

Election	Winner
1969 election	Martyn Finlay
1972 election	Martyn Finlay
1975 election	Martyn Finlay
(Electorate abolished 1978–1993, see Waitakere)
1993 election	Jack Elder
(Electorate abolished 1996, see Waipareira)

== Election results ==
=== 2026 election ===
The next election will be held on 7 November 2026. Candidates for Henderson are listed at Candidates in the 2026 New Zealand general election by electorate § Henderson. Official results will be available after 27 November 2026.

=== 1993 election ===
1993 general election: Henderson
Party	Candidate	Votes	%	±%
Labour	Jack Elder	6,381	39.81	
National	David Jorgensen	4,251	26.52	
Alliance	Alistair Paterson	3,378	21.07	
NZ First	Arthur Albert	1,120	6.98	
Christian Heritage	Clive Thompson	618	3.85	
McGillicuddy Serious	Doug Mackie	106	0.66	
Workers Rights	Sue Bradford	95	0.59	
Independent	Grant Philpott	53	0.33	
Independent	Victor Bryers	23	0.14	
Majority		2,130	13.29	
Turnout		16,025	80.73	
Registered electors		19,850		

=== 1975 election ===
1975 general election: Henderson
Party	Candidate	Votes	%	±%
Labour	Martyn Finlay	7,665	43.16	−17.05
National	Warren Adams	7,264	40.90	
Social Credit	Wendy Glamuzina	1,572	8.85	
Values	Julie Mowat	1,222	6.88	
Socialist Unity	Jim Thomson	35	0.19	
Majority		401	2.25	−27.87
Turnout		17,758	80.84	−5.03
Registered electors		21,966		

=== 1972 election ===
1972 general election: Henderson
Party	Candidate	Votes	%	±%
Labour	Martyn Finlay	8,438	60.21	+4.14
National	Ross C. MacFarlane	4,217	30.09	
Social Credit	Wayne Brodeur	1,240	8.84	
New Democratic	Len Inkster	117	0.83	
Majority		4,221	30.12	+8.73
Turnout		14,012	85.87	−4.14
Registered electors		16,316		

=== 1969 election ===
1969 general election: Henderson
Party	Candidate	Votes	%	±%
Labour	Martyn Finlay	8,635	56.07	
National	Adrian Clarke	5,340	34.67	
Social Credit	William Edward Rossiter	1,204	7.81	
Independent	Marianne Simpkins	219	1.42	
Majority		3,295	21.39	
Turnout		15,398	90.01	
Registered electors		17,106		
