= Glendene (electorate) =

Glendene 2025 electorate boundaries

Map of boundaries at the 2026 general election

Glendene is a New Zealand electorate in West Auckland, returning a single member to the New Zealand House of Representatives. It was used for the first time in the 2026 New Zealand general election.

== Population centres ==
The Glendene electorate is centred on the Whau River. It provides representation for communities in Avondale, Kelston, Glendene, Te Atatū South and the Te Atatū peninsula.

The electorate borders Henderson to the west at Oratia Stream, Waitakere to the south at Great North Road and the North Auckland Line, Mount Roskill to the south east at Great North Road and Mount Albert to the east at Oakley Creek.

== History ==
The 2025 boundary review saw the reconfiguration of electorates in West Auckland resulting in the disestablishment of Te Atatū, Kelston and New Lynn. The new Glendene electorate was created using about half of the former Te Atatū and Kelston electorates, as well as a small population around Avondale Racecourse from New Lynn.

== Election results ==
=== 2026 election ===
The next election was held on 7 November 2026. Candidates for Glendene are listed at Candidates in the 2026 New Zealand general election by electorate § Glendene. Official results will be available after 27 November 2026.
