= Waitākere (electorate) =

Map showing the Waitakere electorate following the 2025 boundary changes

Interactive map of boundaries at the 2026 general election

Waitākere, previously called Waitakere, is a New Zealand electorate, returning a single member to the New Zealand House of Representatives. It has been recreated with new boundaries for the 2026 general election following three previous periods of existence.

The electorate was first formed for the 1946 election and it continued until 1969. It was restored in 1978 and was abolished in 1987. The third period of the electorate was from 1993 to 2014.

== Population centres ==
Waitakere is centred on the Waitakere Ranges in west Auckland. It covers the coastal settlements and rural towns of Waitākere, Te Henga / Bethells Beach, Piha, Karekare, Waiatarua, Oratia, Huia, Little Huia, Cornwallis, Parau and Laingholm, and the West Auckland suburbs of Woodlands Park, Waima, Titirangi, Konini, Glen Eden, Kaurilands, Green Bay and southern New Lynn.

The electorate's western boundary runs along the coast from Whatipu Beach, through Piha, to Te Henga / Bethells Beach. Its northern edge abuts the Kaipara ki Mahurangi, Henderson and Glendene electorates before meeting Mt Roskill in the east. The southern boundary runs through Manukau Harbour.

== History ==
The 1941 New Zealand census had been postponed due to World War II, so the 1946 electoral redistribution had to take ten years of population growth and movements into account. The North Island gained a further two electorates from the South Island due to faster population growth. The abolition of the country quota through the Electoral Amendment Act, 1945 reduced the number and increased the size of rural electorates. None of the existing electorates remained unchanged, 27 electorates were abolished, eight former electorates were re-established, and 19 electorates were created for the first time, including Waitakere.

Waitakere was based around the western suburbs of Auckland. Given the nature of population growth in greater Auckland, and the addition of three new seats in Auckland, the boundaries of Waitakere moved around at every electoral redistribution; in 1999, they were moved northwards as far as Helensville before being pulled back south three years later. In its last boundaries before abolition, the electorate included the Waitakere City suburbs of Henderson, Rānui and Swanson before heading west over the Waitākere Ranges to Piha.

Waitakere was first abolished in the 1967 electoral redistribution and most of its area went into the new Henderson electorate. Henderson existed for three electoral cycles and was abolished again through the 1977 electoral redistribution, when Waitakere was recreated. It continued in existence until 1987 when its population was split between Titirangi and West Auckland. In both of its first two periods, the seat was won only by Labour candidates.

The name Waitakere was reclaimed and applied to a new seat in 1993, which was expanded ahead of the introduction of Mixed Member Proportional (MMP) voting in 1996 election at the expense of the former seats of Henderson and Titirangi. In this period, the electorate was won five times by National candidates and only twice by Labour. The election result in 2011 was very close: on election night, Paula Bennett was thought to have held the seat by 349 votes but after all votes were counted it was determined that Carmel Sepuloni had won by 11 votes. National requested a judicial recount which found Bennett had held the seat by nine votes.

In November 2013, it was proposed that the Waitakere electorate be abolished for the 2014 general election. The electorate was mainly subsumed by Helensville, Te Atatū, and the new Kelston electorate, with a small section moving to the new Upper Harbour electorate.

The 2025 boundary review saw the reconfiguration of electorates in West Auckland resulting in the disestablishment of Te Atatū, Kelston and New Lynn. Waitakere was reconstituted with new boundaries drawing from parts of New Lynn and Kelston.

=== Members of Parliament ===
Key

Labour National

Election	Winner
1946 election	Rex Mason
1949 election	Rex Mason
1951 election	Rex Mason
1954 election	Rex Mason
1957 election	Rex Mason
1960 election	Rex Mason
1963 election	Martyn Finlay
1966 election	Martyn Finlay
(Electorate abolished 1969–1978, see Henderson)
1978 election	Ralph Maxwell
1981 election	Ralph Maxwell
1984 election	Ralph Maxwell
(Electorate abolished 1987–1993, see Titirangi and West Auckland)
1993 election	Brian Neeson
1996 election	Marie Hasler
1999 election	Brian Neeson
2002 election	Lynne Pillay
2005 election	Lynne Pillay
2008 election	Paula Bennett
2011 election	Paula Bennett
(Electorate abolished in 2014, see Kelston)

=== List MPs ===
Members of Parliament elected from party lists in elections where that person also unsuccessfully contested the Waitakere electorate. Unless otherwise stated, all MPs terms began and ended at general elections.

Election	Winner
1999 election	Jonathan Hunt
2005 election	Paula Bennett
2008 election	Lynne Pillay

== Election results ==
=== 2026 election ===
The next election will be held on 7 November 2026. Candidates for Waitakere are listed at Candidates in the 2026 New Zealand general election by electorate § Waitakere. Official results will be available after 27 November 2026.

=== 2011 election ===
Due to the closeness of the election in Waitakere a judicial recount was undertaken on 16 December and it was confirmed that Bennett had won by nine votes on 17 December.

2011 general election: Waitakere
Notes:	Blue background denotes the winner of the electorate vote. Pink background denotes a candidate elected from their party list. Yellow background denotes an electorate win by a list member, or other incumbent. A ✓ or ✗ denotes status of any incumbent, win or lose respectively.						
Party	Candidate	Votes	%	±%	Party votes	%	±%
National	✓ Paula Bennett	13,465	44.74	−0.16	12,533	40.27	−0.95
Labour	Carmel Sepuloni	13,456	44.71	+1.88	11,579	37.21	−2.57
Green	Stephen Tollestrup	1,855	6.16	+0.67	3,308	10.63	+4.16
Conservative	Danny Mountain	611	2.03	+2.03	753	2.42	+2.42
Legalise Cannabis	Jeff Lye	331	1.10	+1.10	166	0.53	+0.01
Mana	Sue Bradford	322	1.06	+1.06	174	0.56	+0.56
Libertarianz	Peter Osborne	55	0.18	+0.18	33	0.11	+0.06
NZ First					2,011	6.46	+2.91
ACT					259	0.83	−2.56
Māori Party					168	0.54	−0.23
United Future					125	0.40	−0.31
Alliance					9	0.03	−0.10
Democrats					4	0.01	−0.01
Informal votes		652			300		
Total valid votes		30,095			31,122		
National hold	Majority	9	0.03	−2.04			

Electorate (as at 26 November 2011): 43,143

=== 2008 election ===
2008 general election: Waitakere
Notes:	Blue background denotes the winner of the electorate vote. Pink background denotes a candidate elected from their party list. Yellow background denotes an electorate win by a list member, or other incumbent. A ✓ or ✗ denotes status of any incumbent, win or lose respectively.						
Party	Candidate	Votes	%	±%	Party votes	%	±%
National	Paula Bennett	13,704	44.90	+11.83	12,952	41.22	+7.05
Labour	✗ Lynne Pillay	13,072	42.83	−5.98	12,498	39.77	−6.88
Green	Gary Stewart	1,676	5.49	+0.05	2,032	6.47	+0.54
NZ First	Craig McNair	597	1.96	−2.36	1,117	3.55	−2.07
ACT	John G Riddell	482	1.58	+0.25	1,067	3.40	+2.07
Pacific	Fia Misa Tupou	448	1.47	+1.47	398	1.27	+1.27
Family Party	Michael Kidd	358	1.17	+1.17	136	0.43	+0.43
Independent	Rita Beckmannflay	107	0.35	+0.35			
Alliance	Sandra Ethell	78	0.26	+0.06	42	0.13	+0.02
Māori Party					241	0.77	+0.10
Progressive					225	0.72	−0.44
United Future					224	0.71	−2.23
Bill and Ben					168	0.53	+0.53
Legalise Cannabis					166	0.53	+0.26
Kiwi					106	0.34	+0.34
Workers Party					15	0.05	+0.05
Libertarianz					14	0.04	+0.02
RAM					10	0.03	+0.03
Democrats					7	0.02	+0.004
RONZ					5	0.02	±0.00
Informal votes		300			149		
Total valid votes		30,522			31,423		
National gain from Labour	Majority	632	2.07	+17.81			

=== 2005 election ===
2005 general election: Waitakere
Notes:	Blue background denotes the winner of the electorate vote. Pink background denotes a candidate elected from their party list. Yellow background denotes an electorate win by a list member, or other incumbent. A ✓ or ✗ denotes status of any incumbent, win or lose respectively.						
Party	Candidate	Votes	%	±%	Party votes	%	±%
Labour	✓ Lynne Pillay	15,325	48.81	+10.42	14,988	46.65	
National	Paula Bennett	10,383	33.07	+13.41	10,976	34.16	
Green	David Clendon	1,709	5.44		1,903	5.92	
NZ First	Brendon Stewart	1,354	4.31		1,806	5.62	
United Future	Hannah Baral	1,035	3.30		944	2.94	
ACT	John Riddell	416	1.33		427	1.33	
Destiny	Stan Green	394	1.25		227	0.71	
Progressive	David Parkyn	293	0.93		370	1.15	
Māori Party	Charles Joe	272	0.87		213	0.66	
Direct Democracy	Alona Covich	79	0.25		33	0.10	
Family Rights	John Ulberg	74	0.24		28	0.09	
Alliance	Sandra Ethell	62	0.20	−27.37	36	0.11	
Legalise Cannabis					87	0.27	
Christian Heritage					58	0.18	
Libertarianz					8	0.02	
99 MP					7	0.02	
Democrats					6	0.02	
One NZ					5	0.02	
RONZ					5	0.02	
Informal votes		271			127		
Total valid votes		31,396			32,127		
Labour hold	Majority	4,942	15.74	+7.08			

=== 2002 election ===
2002 general election: Waitakere
Notes:	Blue background denotes the winner of the electorate vote. Pink background denotes a candidate elected from their party list. Yellow background denotes an electorate win by a list member, or other incumbent. A ✓ or ✗ denotes status of any incumbent, win or lose respectively.						
Party	Candidate	Votes	%	±%	Party votes	%	±%
Labour	Lynne Pillay	9,756	35.95		12,868	46.68	
Alliance	Laila Harré	7,423	27.35		667	2.41	
National	Marie Hasler	5,295	19.51		3,848	13.96	
NZ First	Arthur Albert	1,249	4.60		2,924	10.60	
Green	Meriel Anne Watts	1,154	4.25		2,194	7.95	
United Future	Graeme Torkler	802	2.95		1,861	6.75	
ACT	John G Riddell	650	2.39		1,860	6.74	
Christian Heritage	Madeleine Jane Flannagan	380	1.40		414	1.50	
Progressive	David Parkin	218	0.80		425	1.54	
ORNZ					215	0.78	
Legalise Cannabis					170	0.62	
One NZ					14	0.05	
Mana Māori					8	0.02	
NMP					0	0.00	
Informal votes		95			204		
Total valid votes		27,131			27,563		
Labour gain from National	Majority	2,333	8.60				

=== 1999 election ===
Refer to Candidates in the New Zealand general election 1999 by electorate#Waitakere for a list of candidates.

=== 1993 election ===
1993 general election: Waitakere
Party	Candidate	Votes	%	±%
National	Brian Neeson	8,283	41.96	
Labour	Barbara Hutchinson	5,103	25.85	
Alliance	Peter Maddison	3,933	19.92	
NZ First	Alf Lake	1,683	8.52	
Christian Heritage	Gary Rae	366	1.85	
McGillicuddy Serious	Allan Martin-Buss	171	0.86	
Independent	Trevor Cullen	120	0.60	
Natural Law	Kay Morgan	81	0.41	
Majority		3,180	16.10	
Turnout		19,740	83.73	
Registered electors		23,573		

=== 1984 election ===
1984 general election: Waitakere
Party	Candidate	Votes	%	±%
Labour	Ralph Maxwell	9,926	48.28	+5.54
National	John McIntosh	5,452	26.51	
NZ Party	Marsha Maxine Marshall	3,224	15.68	
Social Credit	Pat Wojcik	1,872	9.10	−19.10
Independent	Blanche Victoria Holloway	85	0.41	
Majority		4,474	21.76	+8.07
Turnout		20,559	91.49	+2.31
Registered electors		22,471		

=== 1981 election ===
1981 general election: Waitakere
Party	Candidate	Votes	%	±%
Labour	Ralph Maxwell	8,996	42.74	−1.27
National	Martin Gummer	6,113	29.04	
Social Credit	Pat Wojcik	5,935	28.20	+9.14
Majority		2,883	13.69	+3.39
Turnout		21,044	89.18	+16.78
Registered electors		23,595		

=== 1978 election ===
1978 general election: Waitakere
Party	Candidate	Votes	%	±%
Labour	Ralph Maxwell	8,612	44.01	
National	Bill Haresnape	6,596	33.71	
Social Credit	Pat Wojcik	3,731	19.06	
Values	Sandy Gauntlett	452	2.31	
Socialist Action	B A Jones	174	0.88	
Majority		2,016	10.30	
Turnout		19,565	72.40	
Registered electors		27,021		

=== 1966 election ===
1966 general election: Waitakere
Party	Candidate	Votes	%	±%
Labour	Martyn Finlay	9,256	52.39	−2.14
National	Peter Wilkinson	5,443	30.80	
Social Credit	Keith Edward Donald Robertson	2,968	16.79	
Majority		3,813	21.58	+3.54
Turnout		17,667	86.61	−2.63
Registered electors		20,398		

=== 1963 election ===
1963 general election: Waitakere
Party	Candidate	Votes	%	±%
Labour	Martyn Finlay	8,751	54.53	
National	Horace Alexander Nash	5,856	36.49	
Social Credit	George Eric Sutherland	1,079	6.72	
Liberal	Alan Charles Warden	216	1.34	
Communist	Vic Wilcox	144	0.89	−0.16
Majority		2,895	18.04	
Turnout		16,046	89.24	−0.53
Registered electors		17,979		

=== 1960 election ===
1960 general election: Waitakere
Party	Candidate	Votes	%	±%
Labour	Rex Mason	10,680	55.94	−1.78
National	John Herbert Wilkinson	6,971	36.51	
Social Credit	Keith Edward Donald Robertson	1,239	6.48	−1.02
Communist	Vic Wilcox	201	1.05	
Majority		2,895	15.16	−7.78
Turnout		19,091	89.77	−4.07
Registered electors		21,265		

=== 1957 election ===
1957 general election: Waitakere
Party	Candidate	Votes	%	±%
Labour	Rex Mason	9,263	57.72	+1.31
National	Leonard Bradley	5,581	34.77	
Social Credit	Keith Edward Donald Robertson	1,204	7.50	
Majority		3,682	22.94	+1.28
Turnout		16,048	93.84	+3.09
Registered electors		17,100		

=== 1954 election ===
1954 general election: Waitakere
Party	Candidate	Votes	%	±%
Labour	Rex Mason	8,914	56.41	+9.49
National	Jim McAllister	5,490	34.74	
Social Credit	Norman Monteith	1,397	8.84	
Majority		3,424	21.66	+18.37
Turnout		15,801	90.75	+0.20
Registered electors		17,411		

=== 1951 election ===
1951 general election: Waitakere
Party	Candidate	Votes	%	±%
Labour	Rex Mason	9,132	46.92	+4.76
National	Robert Tapper	8,491	43.62	+2.30
Majority		641	3.29	−2.47
Turnout		17,623	90.55	−3.65
Registered electors		19,462		

=== 1949 election ===
1949 general election: Waitakere
Party	Candidate	Votes	%	±%
Labour	Rex Mason	8,341	51.68	−7.46
National	Robert Tapper	7,411	45.92	
Communist	George Jackson	386	2.39	
Majority		930	5.76	−14.20
Turnout		16,138	94.20	+0.10
Registered electors		17,131		

=== 1946 election ===
1946 general election: Waitakere
Party	Candidate	Votes	%	±%
Labour	Rex Mason	8,285	59.14	
National	Archibald Morrison Laing	5,488	39.17	
Independent	Frederick Allen	235	1.67	
Majority		2,797	19.96	
Turnout		14,008	94.30	
Registered electors		14,854		
