= Kenepuru (electorate) =

- Single-member general constituency for the New Zealand House of Representatives
- Interactive map of boundaries from the 2026 election
- Formation: 2026
- Region: Wellington
- Character: Urban
- Term: 3 years

Member for Kenepuru

Kenepuru is a New Zealand parliamentary electorate that was used for the first time in the 2026 New Zealand general election. It is focused on northern Wellington and southern Porirua.

== Population centres ==
The Kenepuru electorate is centered on the Kenepuru suburb of Porirua. It reaches north through Porirua city centre to Onepoto and Titahi Bay in the west and Papakōwhai and Ascot Park in the east. Facing south, the electorate encompasses the major Wellington suburbs of Tawa and Johnsonville, as well as the rural community of Ohariu.

== History ==
The 2025 boundary review required a reduction in North Island electorates by one to reflect nationwide population shifts. The three Wellington City electorates (Rongotai, Wellington Central and Ōhāriu) were all underpopulated. All were abolished with flow-on effects for the wider region. The Mana electorate centred on Porirua was also abolished, with its population divided between Kenepuru and Kapiti.

== Election results ==
=== 2026 election ===
The 2026 election was held on 7 November 2026. Candidates for Kenepuru are listed at Candidates in the 2026 New Zealand general election by electorate § Kenepuru. Official results will be available after 27 November 2026.
