= Mt Maunganui (electorate) =

- Single-member general constituency for the New Zealand House of Representatives
- Interactive map of boundaries from the 2026 election
- Formation: 2026
- Region: Tauranga
- Character: Urban
- Term: 3 years

Member for Mt Maunganui

Mt Maunganui is a parliamentary electorate in the 2026 New Zealand general election. The Tauranga electorate is moving westwards, with the Bay of Plenty electorate gaining the suburb of Mount Maunganui. This shift triggered a renaming to Mt Maunganui. Also included are the suburbs of Papamoa, Welcome Bay, Hairini, Maungatapu, Ohauiti, Waimapu, and Poike. The electorate will be used from the 2026 general election onwards.

== Election results ==
=== 2026 election ===
The 2026 election was held on 7 November 2026. Candidates for Mt Maunganui are listed at Candidates in the 2026 New Zealand general election by electorate § Mt Maunganui. Official results will be available after 27 November 2026.
