= Candidates in the 2023 New Zealand general election by electorate =

New Zealand political candidates in the MMP era
| Year | Party list | Candidates |
|---|---|---|
| 1996 | party lists | by electorate |
| 1999 | party lists | by electorate |
| 2002 | party lists | by electorate |
| 2005 | party lists | by electorate |
| 2008 | party lists | by electorate |
| 2011 | party lists | by electorate |
| 2014 | party lists | by electorate |
| 2017 | party lists | by electorate |
| 2020 | party lists | by electorate |
| 2023 | party lists | by electorate |
| 2026 | party lists | by electorate |

This page lists candidates contesting electorates in the 2023 New Zealand general election.

== General electorates ==
=== Auckland Central ===
2023 general election: Auckland Central
| Notes: | Blue background denotes an incumbent. Pink background denotes a current list MP. Yellow background denotes a retiring MP. | | | |
| Party | Candidate | Notes | List # | Source |
|---|---|---|---|---|
| Legalise Cannabis | Christopher Coker | Contested Bay of Plenty in 2020; contested Tauranga in 2022 | 9 | |
| Rock the Vote NZ | Paul Davie | Contested New Lynn for Voice of the People in 2020 | 7 | |
| Animal Justice | Madeleine Kane | | 15 | |
| Independent | Andi Shen Liu | | | |
| National | Mahesh Muralidhar | | 43 | |
| ACT | Felix Poole | Contested electorate in 2020 | 25 | |
| Labour | Oscar Sims | | 63 | |
| New Nation | Guy Slocum | | 2 | |
| Green | Chlöe Swarbrick | | 3 | |
| Opportunities | Damian Sycamore | | 8 | |
Retiring incumbents and withdrawn candidates
| Money Free Party | Luke Beharral | Announced, but not on final list of candidates | | |
| ACT | Scott Boness | | | |
| NZ First | Heeni Phillips-Williams | Announced, but not on final list of candidates | | |

=== Banks Peninsula ===
2023 general election: Banks Peninsula
| Notes: | Blue background denotes an incumbent. Pink background denotes a current list MP. Yellow background denotes a retiring MP. | | | |
| Party | Candidate | Notes | List # | Source |
|---|---|---|---|---|
| DemocracyNZ | Doug Allington | | 9 | |
| Animal Justice | Paran Jeet | | 10 | |
| NZ First | Lindsay Kerslake | | | |
| Labour | Tracey McLellan | | 27 | |
| NewZeal | Lisa Mead | | | |
| Green | Lan Pham | | 6 | |
| ACT | Laura Trask | | 10 | |
| Independent | Peter Wakeman | Contested Tauranga and Hamilton West in 2022 | | |
| National | Vanessa Weenink | | 40 | |

=== Bay of Plenty ===
2023 general election: Bay of Plenty
| Notes: | Blue background denotes an incumbent. Pink background denotes a current list MP. Yellow background denotes a retiring MP. | | | |
| Party | Candidate | Notes | List # | Source |
|---|---|---|---|---|
| Leighton Baker Party | Wendy Gillespie | | 2 | |
| Animal Justice | Caitlin Grattan | | 14 | |
| ACT | Cameron Luxton | Contested Tauranga in 2020 and 2022 | 11 | |
| Green | Matthew Macmillan | | | |
| NZ First | Kirsten Murfitt | Originally selected to contest Tauranga for DemocracyNZ | | |
| National | Tom Rutherford | Sought nomination in 2022 Tauranga by-election | 70 | |
| Labour | Pare Taikato | | 54 | |
| Independent | Taupo Wahed | | | |
Retiring incumbents and withdrawn candidates
| National | Todd Muller | Was re-selected, but later chose to retire | | |

=== Botany ===
2023 general election: Botany
| Notes: | Blue background denotes an incumbent. Pink background denotes a current list MP. Yellow background denotes a retiring MP. | | | |
| Party | Candidate | Notes | List # | Source |
|---|---|---|---|---|
| NZ Loyal | John Armstrong | | | |
| ACT | Bo Burns | | 54 | |
| New Conservative | Dieuwe de Boer | Contested electorate in 2020 | 2 | |
| National | Christopher Luxon | | 1 | |
| Animal Justice | Robert McNeil | | 1 | |
| Labour | Kharag Singh | | 66 | |
Retiring incumbents and withdrawn candidates
| Vision NZ | Mark Terrill | Announced, but not on final list of candidates | | |

=== Christchurch Central ===
2023 general election: Christchurch Central
| Notes: | Blue background denotes an incumbent. Pink background denotes a current list MP. Yellow background denotes a retiring MP. | | | |
| Party | Candidate | Notes | List # | Source |
|---|---|---|---|---|
| NZ First | Mark Arneil | Contested electorate in 2020 | | |
| Legalise Cannabis | Michael Britnell | Contested electorate in 2020 | 3 | |
| Green | Kahurangi Carter | | 14 | |
| ACT | Matthew Fisken | | 44 | |
| Animal Justice | Sarah Jackson | | 7 | |
| National | Dale Stephens | Contested Ohariu-Belmont in 2002, Contested electorate in 2020 | 29 | |
| Labour | Duncan Webb | | 20 | |

=== Christchurch East ===
2023 general election: Christchurch East
| Notes: | Blue background denotes an incumbent. Pink background denotes a current list MP. Yellow background denotes a retiring MP. | | | |
| Party | Candidate | Notes | List # | Source |
|---|---|---|---|---|
| Green | Sahra Ahmed | | | |
| Labour | Reuben Davidson | Contested Selwyn in 2020 | 57 | |
| New Conservative | Helen Houghton | Contested electorate in 2020 | 1 | |
| Legalise Cannabis | Paula Lambert | Contested electorate in 2020 | 4 | |
| Independent | Sam Park | | | |
| ACT | Toni Severin | Contested electorate in 2020 | 14 | |
| National | Matt Stock | | 50 | |
| Animal Justice | Danette Wereta | | 5 | |
| NZ First | Shane Wiremu | | | |
Retiring incumbents and withdrawn candidates
| Labour | Poto Williams | | | |

=== Coromandel ===
2023 general election: Coromandel
| Notes: | Blue background denotes an incumbent. Pink background denotes a current list MP. Yellow background denotes a retiring MP. | | | |
| Party | Candidate | Notes | List # | Source |
|---|---|---|---|---|
| NZ First | Caleb Ansell | Contested Waikato for New Conservative in 2020 | | |
| NZ Loyal | Ray Cobb | | | |
| Green | Pamela Grealey | Contested electorate in 2020 | | |
| Labour | Beryl Riley | | 75 | |
| National | Scott Simpson | | 55 | |
| Outdoors | Sarai TePou | Contested Tāmaki for Advance NZ in 2020 | | |
| ACT | Joanna Verburg | | 55 | |
Retiring incumbents and withdrawn candidates
| New Nation | Andrew Hollis | | | |

=== Dunedin ===
2023 general election: Dunedin
| Notes: | Blue background denotes an incumbent. Pink background denotes a current list MP. Yellow background denotes a retiring MP. | | | |
| Party | Candidate | Notes | List # | Source |
|---|---|---|---|---|
| Labour | Rachel Brooking | | 23 | |
| New Conservative | Cyndee Elder | | 7 | |
| Green | Francisco Hernandez | | 17 | |
| NZ First | Keegan Langeveld | | 20 | |
| Legalise Cannabis | Adrian McDermott | | | |
| ACT | Tim Newman | | 53 | |
| Independent | Jim O'Malley | | | |
| Opportunities | Benjamin Peters | Contested electorate in 2020 | 3 | |
| Independent | Pamela Taylor | | | |
| National | Michael Woodhouse | Contested electorate in 2020 | none | |
Retiring incumbents and withdrawn candidates
| Labour | David Clark | | | |

=== East Coast ===
2023 general election: East Coast
| Notes: | Blue background denotes an incumbent. Pink background denotes a current list MP. Yellow background denotes a retiring MP. | | | |
| Party | Candidate | Notes | List # | Source |
|---|---|---|---|---|
| Independent | Monaco Caracas | | | |
| Labour | Tāmati Coffey | MP for Waiariki 2017–20; cancelled planned retirement from Parliament following Allan's resignation | 36 | |
| Independent | Gordon Dickson | Contested Tauranga and Hamilton West in 2022 | | |
| Te Pāti Māori | Fallyn Flavell | | | |
| ACT | Michael Howe | | 27 | |
| National | Dana Kirkpatrick | | 44 | |
| Vision NZ | Leighton Packer | | | |
| Independent | Don Richards | | | |
| DemocracyNZ | Chris Robinson | | 12 | |
| NZ First | Craig Sinclair | | | |
| Green | Jordan Walker | | | |
Retiring incumbents and withdrawn candidates
| Labour | Kiri Allan | Was re-selected, but later chose to retire | | |

=== East Coast Bays ===
2023 general election: East Coast Bays
| Notes: | Blue background denotes an incumbent. Pink background denotes a current list MP. Yellow background denotes a retiring MP. | | | |
| Party | Candidate | Notes | List # | Source |
|---|---|---|---|---|
| NewZeal | Paul Adams | United Future list MP 2002–2005; contested electorate for Family Party in 2008 | | |
| Labour | Naisi Chen | Contested electorate in 2017; contested Botany in 2020; sought nomination in Auckland Central | 33 | |
| NZ Loyal | Bill Dyet | Originally selected by DemocracyNZ to contest Whangaparāoa; contested Northcote for New Conservative in 2020 | | |
| ACT | Michael McCook | Contested electorate in 2020 | 32 | |
| National | Erica Stanford | | 7 | |

=== Epsom ===
2023 general election: Epsom
| Notes: | Blue background denotes an incumbent. Pink background denotes a current list MP. Yellow background denotes a retiring MP. | | | |
| Party | Candidate | Notes | List # | Source |
|---|---|---|---|---|
| Labour | Camilla Belich | Contested electorate in 2020; sought nomination in Mount Albert | 26 | |
| National | Paul Goldsmith | Contested electorate in 2020 | 5 | |
| NZ Loyal | Anna Rotheray | | | |
| ACT | David Seymour | | 1 | |
| Opportunities | Nina Su | | 4 | |
| NZ First | Tanya Unkovich | | 8 | |
| Green | Lawrence Xu-Nan | Contested Pakuranga in 2020 | 16 | |

=== Hamilton East ===
2023 general election: Hamilton East
| Notes: | Blue background denotes an incumbent. Pink background denotes a current list MP. Yellow background denotes a retiring MP. | | | |
| Party | Candidate | Notes | List # | Source |
|---|---|---|---|---|
| NZ Loyal | Tanya Ban | | | |
| Animal Justice | Lily Carrington | | 8 | |
| Opportunities | Alex Corkin | | 12 | |
| New World Order McCann Party | Nathan Lee Couper | | | |
| Labour | Georgie Dansey | Contested Hamilton West in 2022 | 31 | |
| Republic of New Zealand Party | Jacobus Gielen | Contested electorate in 2020 | | |
| National | Ryan Hamilton | | 66 | |
| NZ First | Russelle Knaap | | 32 | |
| Te Pāti Māori | Awatea Parker | | 30 | |
| ACT | Ash Parmar | | 13 | |
Retiring incumbents and withdrawn candidates
| Labour | Jamie Strange | | | |

=== Hamilton West ===
2023 general election: Hamilton West
| Notes: | Blue background denotes an incumbent. Pink background denotes a current list MP. Yellow background denotes a retiring MP. | | | |
| Party | Candidate | Notes | List # | Source |
|---|---|---|---|---|
| Green | Benjamin Doyle | | 18 | |
| Vision NZ | Rudi du Plooy | Originally selected as New Conservative candidate; contested electorate for New Conservative in 2022 | | |
| Opportunities | Naomi Pocock | Contested electorate in 2022; contested Hamilton East in 2020 | 9 | |
| National | Tama Potaka | | 24 | |
| ACT | Susan Stevenson | | 31 | |
| NZ First | Kevin Stone | | | |
| Labour | Myra Williamson | | 62 | |
| Animal Justice | Melanie Wilson | | 16 | |

=== Hutt South ===
2023 general election: Hutt South
| Notes: | Blue background denotes an incumbent. Pink background denotes a current list MP. Yellow background denotes a retiring MP. | | | |
| Party | Candidate | Notes | List # | Source |
|---|---|---|---|---|
| Labour | Ginny Andersen | | 17 | |
| National | Chris Bishop | MP for Hutt South 2017–2020 | 3 | |
| NZ Loyal | Jordan Blake | | | |
| NZ First | Lee Donoghue | | 12 | |
| Green | Neelu Jennings | | 28 | |
| ACT | Andy Parkins | Contested electorate in 2020 | 24 | |
| Vision NZ | Max Rangitutia | | 32 | |
| Opportunities | Ben Wylie-van Eerd | Contested electorate in 2020 | 11 | |

=== Ilam ===
2023 general election: Ilam
| Notes: | Blue background denotes an incumbent. Pink background denotes a current list MP. Yellow background denotes a retiring MP. | | | |
| Party | Candidate | Notes | List # | Source |
|---|---|---|---|---|
| Legalise Cannabis | Irinka Britnell | | 10 | |
| National | Hamish Campbell | Contested Wigram in 2020 | 63 | |
| Green | Mike Davidson | | 19 | |
| Opportunities | Raf Manji | Contested electorate as an independent in 2017 | 1 | |
| New Conservative | Chris O'Brien | | 5 | |
| DemocracyNZ | Juanita O'Connell | | 6 | |
| Labour | Sarah Pallett | | 51 | |

=== Invercargill ===
2023 general election: Invercargill
| Notes: | Blue background denotes an incumbent. Pink background denotes a current list MP. Yellow background denotes a retiring MP. | | | |
| Party | Candidate | Notes | List # | Source |
|---|---|---|---|---|
| Labour | Liz Craig | Contested electorate in 2020 | 44 | |
| ACT | Scott Donaldson | | 43 | |
| NZ Loyal | David Kowalewski | | | |
| Legalise Cannabis | Kevin O'Connell | | 7 | |
| National | Penny Simmonds | | 16 | |
| Vision NZ | Judith Terrill | Contested Southland for ONE in 2020 | | |

=== Kaikōura ===
2023 general election: Kaikōura
| Notes: | Blue background denotes an incumbent. Pink background denotes a current list MP. Yellow background denotes a retiring MP. | | | |
| Party | Candidate | Notes | List # | Source |
|---|---|---|---|---|
| NZ First | Jamie Arbuckle | Contested electorate in 2020 | 6 | |
| Money Free Party NZ | Shaun Brown | | | |
| DemocracyNZ | Sandra Campbell | | 11 | |
| NZ Loyal | Natalie Colello | | | |
| Labour | Emma Dewhirst | | 67 | |
| New Conservative | David Greenslade | Contested electorate in 2020 | | |
| ACT | Keith Griffiths | | 29 | |
| Independent | Ted Howard | Contested electorate in 2020 | | |
| Independent | John McCaskey | Contested electorate for Social Credit in 2020 | | |
| Green | Richard McCubbin | Contested electorate in 2020 | 39 | |
| National | Stuart Smith | | 56 | |
Retiring incumbents and withdrawn candidates
| Green | Alec McNeil | | | |

=== Kaipara ki Mahurangi ===
2023 general election: Kaipara ki Mahurangi
| Notes: | Blue background denotes an incumbent. Pink background denotes a current list MP. Yellow background denotes a retiring MP. | | | |
| Party | Candidate | Notes | List # | Source |
|---|---|---|---|---|
| ACT | Brent Bailey | | 58 | |
| DemocracyNZ | Sarah Brewer | | 10 | |
| Green | Zephyr Brown | Contested electorate in 2020 | | |
| NZ First | Jenny Marcroft | List MP 2017–2020; contested Auckland Central in 2020 | | |
| National | Chris Penk | | 18 | |
| Labour | Guy Wishart | | 71 | |
Retiring incumbents and withdrawn candidates
| ACT | Anto Coates | | | |
| NZ Loyal | Brenton Faithfull | Withdrew to act as justice of the peace | | |

=== Kelston ===
2023 general election: Kelston
| Notes: | Blue background denotes an incumbent. Pink background denotes a current list MP. Yellow background denotes a retiring MP. | | | |
| Party | Candidate | Notes | List # | Source |
|---|---|---|---|---|
| ACT | Jake Curran | | 42 | |
| NZ First | Anne Degia-Pala | Contested electorate in 2020 | 15 | |
| Green | Golriz Ghahraman | Contested Mount Roskill in 2020 | 7 | |
| Te Pāti Māori | Jacqui Harema | | 24 | |
| New Conservative | Alister Hood | | 6 | |
| National | Ruby Manukia Schaumkel | | 42 | |
| Labour | Carmel Sepuloni | | 3 | |
| DemocracyNZ | Leao Tildsley | Contested electorate for New Conservative in 2020 | 3 | |

=== Mana ===
2023 general election: Mana
| Notes: | Blue background denotes an incumbent. Pink background denotes a current list MP. Yellow background denotes a retiring MP. | | | |
| Party | Candidate | Notes | List # | Source |
|---|---|---|---|---|
| Protect & Prosper New Zealand | Kush Bhargava | | | |
| ACT | Lily Brown | | 22 | |
| Green | Gina Dao-McLay | | 23 | |
| Labour | Barbara Edmonds | | 18 | |
| NZ First | Andy Foster | Contested Wellington Central in 2017 | 7 | |
| Not A Party | Richard Goode | Contested electorate in 2020 | | |
| National | Frances Hughes | | 33 | |
| NZ Loyal | Lisa Temperton | | | |

=== Māngere ===
2023 general election: Māngere
| Notes: | Blue background denotes an incumbent. Pink background denotes a current list MP. Yellow background denotes a retiring MP. | | | |
| Party | Candidate | Notes | List # | Source |
|---|---|---|---|---|
| Vision NZ | Fuiavailili Ala'ilima | Contested electorate for New Conservative in 2020 | 20 | |
| National | Rosemary Bourke | | 32 | |
| ACT | Pothen Joseph | | 46 | |
| Independent | Brooke Pao Stanley | | | |
| Te Pāti Māori | Hilda Peters | | 11 | |
| Labour | Lemauga Lydia Sosene | | 53 | |
| Green | Peter Sykes | Contested electorate in 2020 | 48 | |
Retiring incumbents and withdrawn candidates
| Labour | William Sio | | | |

=== Manurewa ===
2023 general election: Manurewa
| Notes: | Blue background denotes an incumbent. Pink background denotes a current list MP. Yellow background denotes a retiring MP. | | | |
| Party | Candidate | Notes | List # | Source |
|---|---|---|---|---|
| National | Siva Kilari | | 30 | |
| Te Pāti Māori | Rangi McLean | Contested Tāmaki Makaurau in 2014 | 28 | |
| Vision NZ | Caine Warren | | 9 | |
| Labour | Arena Williams | | 48 | |

=== Maungakiekie ===
2023 general election: Maungakiekie
| Notes: | Blue background denotes an incumbent. Pink background denotes a current list MP. Yellow background denotes a retiring MP. | | | |
| Party | Candidate | Notes | List # | Source |
|---|---|---|---|---|
| Independent | Phillip Bridge | | | |
| Rock the Vote NZ | Eric Chuah | Contested Owairaka for Advance NZ in 1996 | 14 | |
| National | Greg Fleming | | 65 | |
| NZ First | Andrew Hogg | | 34 | |
| ACT | Margo Onishchenko | | 59 | |
| Labour | Priyanca Radhakrishnan | | 15 | |
| Green | Sapna Samant | | 30 | |

=== Mount Albert ===
2023 general election: Mount Albert
| Notes: | Blue background denotes an incumbent. Pink background denotes a current list MP. Yellow background denotes a retiring MP. | | | |
| Party | Candidate | Notes | List # | Source |
|---|---|---|---|---|
| National | Melissa Lee | | 13 | |
| Green | Ricardo Menéndez March | Contested Maungakiekie in 2020 | 8 | |
| ACT | Ollie Murphy | | 28 | |
| Independent | Tesi Naufahu | | | |
| Opportunities | Ciara Swords | Contested Whangārei in 2020 | 7 | |
| Human Rights Party | Anthony van den Heuvel | Contested electorate in 2020 | | |
| Labour | Helen White | Contested Auckland Central in 2020 | 47 | |
Retiring incumbents and withdrawn candidates
| Labour | Jacinda Ardern | | | |

=== Mount Roskill ===
2023 general election: Mount Roskill
| Notes: | Blue background denotes an incumbent. Pink background denotes a current list MP. Yellow background denotes a retiring MP. | | | |
| Party | Candidate | Notes | List # | Source |
|---|---|---|---|---|
| National | Carlos Cheung | | 48 | |
| ACT | Rahul Chopra | | 26 | |
| Green | Suveen Sanis Walgampola | | 21 | |
| Labour | Michael Wood | | 45 | |

=== Napier ===
2023 general election: Napier
| Notes: | Blue background denotes an incumbent. Pink background denotes a current list MP. Yellow background denotes a retiring MP. | | | |
| Party | Candidate | Notes | List # | Source |
|---|---|---|---|---|
| Green | Julienne Dickey | | | |
| Labour | Mark Hutchinson | | 60 | |
| DemocracyNZ | Martin Langford | | 4 | |
| ACT | Pawel Milewski | | 34 | |
| National | Katie Nimon | Contested electorate in 2020 | 22 | |
| Independent | John Smith | Contested electorate in 2020 | | |
| NZ First | Laurie Turnbull | | 18 | |
Retiring incumbents and withdrawn candidates
| Labour | Stuart Nash | Was re-selected, but later chose to retire | | |

=== Nelson ===
2023 general election: Nelson
| Notes: | Blue background denotes an incumbent. Pink background denotes a current list MP. Yellow background denotes a retiring MP. | | | |
| Party | Candidate | Notes | List # | Source |
|---|---|---|---|---|
| ACT | Chris Baillie | Contested electorate in 2020 | 17 | |
| Labour | Rachel Boyack | | 42 | |
| National | Blair Cameron | | 35 | |
| Progressive Aotearoa | Bruce Dyer | Contested electorate in 2020 | | |
| Green | Jace Hobbs | | | |
| NZ Loyal | Peter Vaughan | | | |
Retiring incumbents and withdrawn candidates
| Green | Teall Crossen | Contested Rongotai in 2020 | | |
| NZ Loyal | Anne Fitzsimon | Contested West Coast-Tasman for Advance NZ in 2020 | | |
| New Nation | Dean McNamara | Announced, but not on final list of candidates | | |

=== New Lynn ===
2023 general election: New Lynn
| Notes: | Blue background denotes an incumbent. Pink background denotes a current list MP. Yellow background denotes a retiring MP. | | | |
| Party | Candidate | Notes | List # | Source |
|---|---|---|---|---|
| Green | Steve Abel | Contested electorate in 2020 | 9 | |
| ACT | Juan Alvarez de Lugo | | 33 | |
| National | Paulo Garcia | List MP 2019–2020 | 34 | |
| Vision NZ | Phineas Mann | | | |
| NZ Loyal | Steve Oliver | | | |
| Labour | Deborah Russell | | 22 | |

=== New Plymouth ===
2023 general election: New Plymouth
| Notes: | Blue background denotes an incumbent. Pink background denotes a current list MP. Yellow background denotes a retiring MP. | | | |
| Party | Candidate | Notes | List # | Source |
|---|---|---|---|---|
| Labour | Glen Bennett | | 29 | |
| National | David MacLeod | | 67 | |
| ACT | Bruce McGechan | | 62 | |
| New Nation | Greg Robinson | | 3 | |
| Animal Justice | Hamish Watkins | | 6 | |
| NZ Loyal | Warren Willetts | | | |

=== North Shore ===
2023 general election: North Shore
| Notes: | Blue background denotes an incumbent. Pink background denotes a current list MP. Yellow background denotes a retiring MP. | | | |
| Party | Candidate | Notes | List # | Source |
|---|---|---|---|---|
| Green | Pat Baskett | | | |
| Opportunities | Abe Gray | Contested Wellington Central in 2020 | 10 | |
| Labour | George Hampton | | 41 | |
| National | Simon Watts | | 17 | |
| ACT | Anna Yallop | | 21 | |

=== Northcote ===
2023 general election: Northcote
| Notes: | Blue background denotes an incumbent. Pink background denotes a current list MP. Yellow background denotes a retiring MP. | | | |
| Party | Candidate | Notes | List # | Source |
|---|---|---|---|---|
| National | Dan Bidois | MP for Northcote 2018–2020 | 60 | |
| Vision NZ | Mark Donaldson | | | |
| ACT | Leo Foley | | 20 | |
| Labour | Shanan Halbert | | 28 | |
| Green | Andrew Shaw | | | |
| NZ First | Michelle Warren | | | |

=== Northland ===
2023 general election: Northland
| Notes: | Blue background denotes an incumbent. Pink background denotes a current list MP. Yellow background denotes a retiring MP. | | | |
| Party | Candidate | Notes | List # | Source |
|---|---|---|---|---|
| ACT | Mark Cameron | Contested electorate in 2020 | 7 | |
| NZ Loyal | Michael Feyen | Selected to contest Ōtaki for Public Party in 2020 but withdrew | | |
| Northland Party | Mike Finlayson | | | |
| NZ First | Shane Jones | List MP 2005–2014, 2017–2020; contested electorate in 2020 | | |
| DemocracyNZ | Matt King | MP for Northland 2017–2020 | 1 | |
| Legalise Cannabis | Jeffrey Lye | Contested Kelston in 2020 | | |
| National | Grant McCallum | | 68 | |
| Green | Reina Penney | | 24 | |
| Labour | Willow-Jean Prime | | 9 | |

=== Ōhāriu ===
2023 general election: Ōhāriu
| Notes: | Blue background denotes an incumbent. Pink background denotes a current list MP. Yellow background denotes a retiring MP. | | | |
| Party | Candidate | Notes | List # | Source |
|---|---|---|---|---|
| ACT | Paul Day | | 61 | |
| Opportunities | Jessica Hammond | Contested electorate in 2020 | 6 | |
| Protect & Prosper New Zealand | Martin Jenkins | | | |
| Vision NZ | Patrick Lim | | | |
| Labour | Greg O'Connor | | none | |
| Green | Stephanie Rodgers | | 20 | |
| National | Nicola Willis | Contested Wellington Central in 2020 | 2 | |
Retiring incumbents and withdrawn candidates
| DemocracyNZ | Matt Shelton | | | |

=== Ōtaki ===
2023 general election: Ōtaki
| Notes: | Blue background denotes an incumbent. Pink background denotes a current list MP. Yellow background denotes a retiring MP. | | | |
| Party | Candidate | Notes | List # | Source |
|---|---|---|---|---|
| National | Tim Costley | Contested electorate in 2020 | 64 | |
| Green | Ali Muhammad | | 40 | |
| Labour | Terisa Ngobi | | 46 | |
| ACT | Sean Rush | | 51 | |
| NZ Loyal | Bryan Ten-Have | | | |
| Not A Party | Bob Wessex | Contested Coromandel in 2020 | | |

=== Pakuranga ===
2023 general election: Pakuranga
| Notes: | Blue background denotes an incumbent. Pink background denotes a current list MP. Yellow background denotes a retiring MP. | | | |
| Party | Candidate | Notes | List # | Source |
|---|---|---|---|---|
| Rock the Vote NZ | John Alcock | | 10 | |
| National | Simeon Brown | | 9 | |
| Animal Justice | Nicholas Hancock | | 4 | |
| Labour | Nerissa Henry | Contested electorate in 2020 | 61 | |
| ACT | Parmjeet Parmar | National List MP 2014–2020; contested Mount Roskill for National in 2020 | 9 | |
| NZ Loyal | Phil Scothern | | | |

=== Palmerston North ===
2023 general election: Palmerston North
| Notes: | Blue background denotes an incumbent. Pink background denotes a current list MP. Yellow background denotes a retiring MP. | | | |
| Party | Candidate | Notes | List # | Source |
|---|---|---|---|---|
| National | Ankit Bansal | | 52 | |
| Animal Justice | Douglas Begg | | 12 | |
| NZ Loyal | Dean Grant | | | |
| ACT | Mike Harnett | | 45 | |
| Labour | Tangi Utikere | | 25 | |
| Green | Teanau Tuiono | Contested electorate in 2020 | 5 | |

=== Panmure-Ōtāhuhu ===
2023 general election: Panmure-Ōtāhuhu
| Notes: | Blue background denotes an incumbent. Pink background denotes a current list MP. Yellow background denotes a retiring MP. | | | |
| Party | Candidate | Notes | List # | Source |
|---|---|---|---|---|
| Green | Efeso Collins | | 11 | |
| ACT | Antonia Modkova | | 12 | |
| Vision NZ | Karl Mokaraka | | 23 | |
| National | Navtej Singh Randhawa | | 46 | |
| Workers Now | James Robb | | | |
| Labour | Jenny Salesa | | 24 | |
Retiring incumbents and withdrawn candidates
| NZ First | Mahesh Bindra | List MP 2014–2017; contested Hutt South in 2020; announced, but not on final list of candidates | | |

=== Papakura ===
2023 general election: Papakura
| Notes: | Blue background denotes an incumbent. Pink background denotes a current list MP. Yellow background denotes a retiring MP. | | | |
| Party | Candidate | Notes | List # | Source |
|---|---|---|---|---|
| National | Judith Collins | | 10 | |
| Vision NZ | Kathy Harvey | | 24 | |
| Labour | Anahila Kanongata'a-Suisuiki | Contested electorate in 2020 | 34 | |
| Independent | Karin Kerr | | | |
| NZ Loyal | Donna Kouka | | | |
| ACT | Mike McCormick | Contested Takanini in 2020 | 23 | |
| NZ First | Robert Monds | Contested electorate in 2020 | 25 | |

=== Port Waikato ===
2023 general election: Port Waikato
| Notes: | Blue background denotes an incumbent. Pink background denotes a current list MP. Yellow background denotes a retiring MP. | | | |
| Party | Candidate | Notes | List # | Source |
|---|---|---|---|---|
| National | Andrew Bayly | | 15 | |
| DemocracyNZ | Scotty Bright | | 5 | |
| Green | Karla Buchanan | | | |
| ACT | Neil Christensen† | Died during election, triggering a by-election | 35 | |
| NZ First | Casey Costello | Contested Māngere for ACT in 2011 | | |
| Labour | Gwendoline Keel | | 65 | |
| Animal Justice | Anna Rippon | | 2 | |
| Vision NZ | Vijay Sudhamalla | Originally selected as DemocracyNZ candidate | | |
| NZ Loyal | Kim Turner | | | |

=== Rangitata ===
2023 general election: Rangitata
| Notes: | Blue background denotes an incumbent. Pink background denotes a current list MP. Yellow background denotes a retiring MP. | | | |
| Party | Candidate | Notes | List # | Source |
|---|---|---|---|---|
| NZ First | Robert Ballantyne | | 16 | |
| Rock the Vote NZ | Michael Clarkson | | 18 | |
| Green | Barbara Gilchrist | | 34 | |
| Labour | Jo Luxton | | 19 | |
| National | James Meager | | 69 | |
| NZ Loyal | Wayne Shearer | | | |
| New Conservative | Karl Thomas | | 3 | |
| New Nation | Dolf van Amersfoort | | 4 | |
Retiring incumbents and withdrawn candidates
| ACT | Elaine Naidu Franz | Withdrew after a social media controversy | | |

=== Rangitīkei ===
2023 general election: Rangitīkei
| Notes: | Blue background denotes an incumbent. Pink background denotes a current list MP. Yellow background denotes a retiring MP. | | | |
| Party | Candidate | Notes | List # | Source |
|---|---|---|---|---|
| Labour | Zulfiqar Butt | | 68 | |
| Green | Bernard Long | | | |
| ACT | Andrew Hoggard | | 5 | |
| National | Suze Redmayne | | 21 | |
| NZ First | Helma Vermeulen | | | |
Retiring incumbents and withdrawn candidates
| National | Ian McKelvie | | | |
| Green | John Cockrem | | | |

=== Remutaka ===
2023 general election: Remutaka
| Notes: | Blue background denotes an incumbent. Pink background denotes a current list MP. Yellow background denotes a retiring MP. | | | |
| Party | Candidate | Notes | List # | Source |
|---|---|---|---|---|
| National | Emma Chatterton | | 27 | |
| Labour | Chris Hipkins | | 1 | |
| ACT | Michael Hurle | | 60 | |
| Green | Chris Norton | Contested electorate in 2020 | | |
| NewZeal | Tony Pitiroi | | | |
| Vision NZ | Heker Robertson | | | |

=== Rongotai ===
2023 general election: Rongotai
| Notes: | Blue background denotes an incumbent. Pink background denotes a current list MP. Yellow background denotes a retiring MP. | | | |
| Party | Candidate | Notes | List # | Source |
|---|---|---|---|---|
| Animal Justice | Atom Emet | | 3 | |
| Labour | Fleur Fitzsimons | | 56 | |
| Green | Julie Anne Genter | Contested Mount Albert in 2017 | 4 | |
| Independent | Don McDonald | Contested electorate in 2020 | | |
| ACT | Nicole McKee | Contested electorate in 2020 | 3 | |
| NZ First | Geoff Mills | Contested electorate in 2017 | 28 | |
| National | Karuna Muthu | Contested electorate for United Future in 2008 | 51 | |
| Vision NZ | Merania Roa | | 25 | |
| New Conservative | Bruce Welsh | Contested electorate in 2020 | | |
Retiring incumbents and withdrawn candidates
| Labour | Paul Eagle | | | |

=== Rotorua ===
2023 general election: Rotorua
| Notes: | Blue background denotes an incumbent. Pink background denotes a current list MP. Yellow background denotes a retiring MP. | | | |
| Party | Candidate | Notes | List # | Source |
|---|---|---|---|---|
| NewZeal | Kariana Black-Vercoe | Contested electorate in 2020 | 3 | |
| National | Todd McClay | | 12 | |
| Independent | Jonn Naera | | | |
| Te Pāti Māori | Merepeka Raukawa-Tait | | 8 | |
| ACT | Marten Rozeboom | | 50 | |
| Labour | Ben Sandford | Contested electorate in 2017 | 69 | |

=== Selwyn ===
2023 general election: Selwyn
| Notes: | Blue background denotes an incumbent. Pink background denotes a current list MP. Yellow background denotes a retiring MP. | | | |
| Party | Candidate | Notes | List # | Source |
|---|---|---|---|---|
| New Conservative | Abe Coulter | | 9 | |
| NZ Loyal | Logan Courtney | | | |
| National | Nicola Grigg | | 19 | |
| ACT | Ben Harvey | | 15 | |
| Labour | Luke Jones | | 74 | |

=== Southland ===
2023 general election: Southland
| Notes: | Blue background denotes an incumbent. Pink background denotes a current list MP. Yellow background denotes a retiring MP. | | | |
| Party | Candidate | Notes | List # | Source |
|---|---|---|---|---|
| NZ Loyal | Logan Evans | | | |
| Legalise Cannabis | Anntwinette Grumball | | 11 | |
| Green | Dave Kennedy | Contested electorate in 2020 | 22 | |
| Vision NZ | Naomi Maclean | | 19 | |
| Labour | Simon McCallum | | 70 | |
| National | Joseph Mooney | | 53 | |
| ACT | Todd Stephenson | | 4 | |
Retiring incumbents and withdrawn candidates
| New Conservative | Paul Deacon | Announced, but not on final list of candidates | 4 | |

=== Taieri ===
2023 general election: Taieri
| Notes: | Blue background denotes an incumbent. Pink background denotes a current list MP. Yellow background denotes a retiring MP. | | | |
| Party | Candidate | Notes | List # | Source |
|---|---|---|---|---|
| Independent | Changrong Dong | | | |
| National | Matthew French | | 49 | |
| Independent | Mac Gardner | | | |
| Labour | Ingrid Leary | | 52 | |
| ACT | Berty Meffan | | 49 | |
| NZ First | Mark Patterson | List MP 2017–2020; contested electorate in 2020 | 4 | |
| NZ Loyal | Fred Roberts | Contested electorate for Advance NZ in 2020 | | |
| Independent | David Webber | Contested electorate in 2020 | | |
| Green | Scott Willis | Contested electorate in 2020 | 12 | |
Retiring incumbents and withdrawn candidates
| National | Stephen Jack | Withdrew due to social media controversy | | |

=== Takanini ===
2023 general election: Takanini
| Notes: | Blue background denotes an incumbent. Pink background denotes a current list MP. Yellow background denotes a retiring MP. | | | |
| Party | Candidate | Notes | List # | Source |
|---|---|---|---|---|
| ACT | Rae Ah Chee | | 30 | |
| Labour | Neru Leavasa | | 38 | |
| National | Rima Nakhle | Contested electorate in 2020 | 41 | |
| Animal Justice | Lynley Tulloch | | 17 | |

=== Tāmaki ===
2023 general election: Tāmaki
| Notes: | Blue background denotes an incumbent. Pink background denotes a current list MP. Yellow background denotes a retiring MP. | | | |
| Party | Candidate | Notes | List # | Source |
|---|---|---|---|---|
| National | Simon O'Connor | | 54 | |
| NZ Loyal | Anne Perratt | | | |
| Labour | Fesaitu Solomone | | 59 | |
| ACT | Brooke van Velden | Contested Wellington Central in 2020 | 2 | |

=== Taranaki-King Country ===
2023 general election: Taranaki-King Country
| Notes: | Blue background denotes an incumbent. Pink background denotes a current list MP. Yellow background denotes a retiring MP. | | | |
| Party | Candidate | Notes | List # | Source |
|---|---|---|---|---|
| Independent | William Bruce Burr | | | |
| National | Barbara Kuriger | | 36 | |
| Vision NZ | Daryl Raison | | | |
| Labour | Angela Roberts | Contested electorate in 2020 | 35 | |
Retiring incumbents and withdrawn candidates
| ACT | Brent Miles | | 56 | |
| DemocracyNZ | Lee Smith | | | |

=== Taupō ===
2023 general election: Taupō
| Notes: | Blue background denotes an incumbent. Pink background denotes a current list MP. Yellow background denotes a retiring MP. | | | |
| Party | Candidate | Notes | List # | Source |
|---|---|---|---|---|
| Labour | Ala' Al-Bustanji | Contested electorate in 2020 | 64 | |
| ACT | Zane Cozens | | 19 | |
| Green | George Patena | | 44 | |
| NZ First | Tira Pehi | | 21 | |
| National | Louise Upston | | 6 | |
| NZ Loyal | Gordon Wilson | | | |

=== Tauranga ===
2023 general election: Tauranga
| Notes: | Blue background denotes an incumbent. Pink background denotes a current list MP. Yellow background denotes a retiring MP. | | | |
| Party | Candidate | Notes | List # | Source |
|---|---|---|---|---|
| Independent | Larry Baldock | United Future list MP 2002–2005; contested electorate for Conservatives in 2011 | | |
| Green | Justin Crooks | | 32 | |
| NZ First | Erika Harvey | Contested electorate in 2020 | 10 | |
| New Conservative | Jonathan Langridge | | 8 | |
| Vision NZ | Leon Samuels | | 27 | |
| Animal Justice | Chelsea Stokman | | 13 | |
| Te Pāti Māori | Mikaere Sydney | | 29 | |
| Labour | Jan Tinetti | Contested electorate in 2020 and 2022 | 6 | |
| National | Sam Uffindell | | 57 | |
| ACT | Christine Young | | 18 | |
Retiring incumbents and withdrawn candidates
| DemocracyNZ | Kirsten Murfitt | Contesting the Bay of Plenty electorate for New Zealand First | | |

=== Te Atatū ===
2023 general election: Te Atatū
| Notes: | Blue background denotes an incumbent. Pink background denotes a current list MP. Yellow background denotes a retiring MP. | | | |
| Party | Candidate | Notes | List # | Source |
|---|---|---|---|---|
| ACT | Simon Court | Contested electorate in 2020 | 8 | |
| Green | Zooey Neumann | | 41 | |
| National | Angee Nicholas | | 39 | |
| Independent | Melanie Phillips | | | |
| Te Pāti Māori | John Tamihere | Contested Tāmaki Makaurau in 2020 | 26 | |
| Labour | Phil Twyford | | 49 | |

=== Tukituki ===
2023 general election: Tukituki
| Notes: | Blue background denotes an incumbent. Pink background denotes a current list MP. Yellow background denotes a retiring MP. | | | |
| Party | Candidate | Notes | List # | Source |
|---|---|---|---|---|
| ACT | Rob Douglas | | 16 | |
| NZ Loyal | Rob Hulman | | | |
| Labour | Anna Lorck | | 40 | |
| Legalise Cannabis | Romana Manning | Contested electorate in 2020 | 8 | |
| Vision NZ | Michael Ngahuka | | 16 | |
| Independent | Melanie Petrowski | Contested electorate for ONE in 2020 | | |
| Independent | Michael Ponk | | | |
| Green | Nick Ratcliffe | | 25 | |
| Future Youth | Allister Tosh | Contested electorate in 2020 | | |
| National | Catherine Wedd | | 23 | |
Retiring incumbents and withdrawn candidates
| Te Pāti Māori | Heather Te Au-Skipworth | Initially selected for Ikaroa-Rāwhiti | | |

=== Upper Harbour ===
2023 general election: Upper Harbour
| Notes: | Blue background denotes an incumbent. Pink background denotes a current list MP. Yellow background denotes a retiring MP. | | | |
| Party | Candidate | Notes | List # | Source |
|---|---|---|---|---|
| National | Cameron Brewer | | 62 | |
| ACT | Karen Chhour | Contested electorate in 2020 | 6 | |
| New Zealand Sovereignty Party | Tony Corbett | Contested Tauranga in 2022 | | |
| Green | Thea Doyle | | 33 | |
| Opportunities | Shai Navot | Contested North Shore in 2020 | 5 | |
| NZ Loyal | Chris Newman | | | |
| Vision NZ | Bernadette Soares | Contested electorate for New Conservative in 2020 | | |
| Labour | Vanushi Walters | | 30 | |
| NZ First | David Wilson | Contested Whangārei in 2020 | 9 | |

=== Waikato ===
2023 general election: Waikato
| Notes: | Blue background denotes an incumbent. Pink background denotes a current list MP. Yellow background denotes a retiring MP. | | | |
| Party | Candidate | Notes | List # | Source |
|---|---|---|---|---|
| Vision NZ | Lois Dornan | | | |
| NZ First | Stu Husband | Contested Hamilton East in 2020 | | |
| Opportunities | Megan Owen | | 13 | |
| Labour | Jamie Toko | | 73 | |
| National | Tim van de Molen | | 58 | |
Retiring incumbents and withdrawn candidates
| DemocracyNZ | Steve Cranston | | | |
| ACT | Darren Gilchrist | | | |

=== Waimakariri ===
2023 general election: Waimakariri
| Notes: | Blue background denotes an incumbent. Pink background denotes a current list MP. Yellow background denotes a retiring MP. | | | |
| Party | Candidate | Notes | List # | Source |
|---|---|---|---|---|
| Leighton Baker Party | Leighton Baker | Contested electorate for New Conservative in 2020 | 1 | |
| ACT | Ross Campbell | | 40 | |
| National | Matt Doocey | | 8 | |
| DemocracyNZ | Gordon Malcolm | | 2 | |
| Labour | Dan Rosewarne | Contested electorate in 2020 | 32 | |

=== Wairarapa ===
2023 general election: Wairarapa
| Notes: | Blue background denotes an incumbent. Pink background denotes a current list MP. Yellow background denotes a retiring MP. | | | |
| Party | Candidate | Notes | List # | Source |
|---|---|---|---|---|
| NZ Loyal | Pete Arnott | | | |
| National | Mike Butterick | Contested electorate in 2020 | 61 | |
| ACT | Simon Casey | | 41 | |
| Independent | Jared Gardner | | | |
| Labour | Kieran McAnulty | | 16 | |
| Green | Celia Wade-Brown | Contested electorate in 2020 | 15 | |
| Te Pāti Māori | Te Whakapono Waikare | | 31 | |

=== Waitaki ===
2023 general election: Waitaki
| Notes: | Blue background denotes an incumbent. Pink background denotes a current list MP. Yellow background denotes a retiring MP. | | | |
| Party | Candidate | Notes | List # | Source |
|---|---|---|---|---|
| National | Miles Anderson | | 59 | |
| NZ Loyal | Ray Bailey | | | |
| ACT | Sean Beamish | | 38 | |
| Green | Pleasance Hansen | | 36 | |
| NZ First | Anthony Odering | Contested electorate in 2020 | 29 | |
| Labour | Ethan Reille | | 76 | |
| Independent | Daniel Shand | Contested electorate in 2020 | | |
| DemocracyNZ | Roger Small | | 7 | |
Retiring incumbents and withdrawn candidates
| National | Jacqui Dean | | | |

=== Wellington Central ===
2023 general election: Wellington Central
| Notes: | Blue background denotes an incumbent. Pink background denotes a current list MP. Yellow background denotes a retiring MP. | | | |
| Party | Candidate | Notes | List # | Source |
|---|---|---|---|---|
| Opportunities | Natalia Albert | | 2 | |
| Legalise Cannabis | Michael Appleby | Contested electorate in 2020 | 1 | |
| NZ First | Taylor Arneil | | 19 | |
| Independent | Pete Bains | | | |
| Workers Now | Don Franks | | | |
| Independent | Karl Geiringer | | | |
| Animal Justice | Christopher Gordon | | 11 | |
| Vision NZ | Meg Lim | | 30 | |
| Labour | Ibrahim Omer | | 37 | |
| Green | Tamatha Paul | | none | |
| National | Scott Sheeran | | 45 | |
Retiring incumbents and withdrawn candidates
| Labour | Grant Robertson | Contesting list only | | |

=== West Coast-Tasman ===
2023 general election: West Coast-Tasman
| Notes: | Blue background denotes an incumbent. Pink background denotes a current list MP. Yellow background denotes a retiring MP. | | | |
| Party | Candidate | Notes | List # | Source |
|---|---|---|---|---|
| NZ First | Jackie Farrelly | | 27 | |
| Outdoors | Sue Grey | Contested Nelson in 2020; contested Tauranga in 2022 | 2 | |
| ACT | Kelly Lilley | | 47 | |
| NZ Loyal | Sebastian Marinkovich | | | |
| Labour | Damien O'Connor | | 10 | |
| Money Free Party | Richard Osmaston | Contested electorate in 2020; contested Hamilton West in 2022 | | |
| Independent | Patrick Phelps | | | |
| National | Maureen Pugh | Contested electorate in 2020 | 26 | |
| Green | Steve Richards | Contested electorate in 2020 | 45 | |

=== Whanganui ===
2023 general election: Whanganui
| Notes: | Blue background denotes an incumbent. Pink background denotes a current list MP. Yellow background denotes a retiring MP. | | | |
| Party | Candidate | Notes | List # | Source |
|---|---|---|---|---|
| NZ First | William Arnold | | | |
| National | Carl Bates | | 47 | |
| ACT | Craig Dredge | | 52 | |
| Animal Justice | Sandra Kyle | | 9 | |
| Labour | Steph Lewis | | 50 | |
| Green | Marion Sanson | | | |

=== Whangaparāoa ===
2023 general election: Whangaparāoa
| Notes: | Blue background denotes an incumbent. Pink background denotes a current list MP. Yellow background denotes a retiring MP. | | | |
| Party | Candidate | Notes | List # | Source |
|---|---|---|---|---|
| ACT | Simon Angelo | | 37 | |
| DemocracyNZ | Craig Laybourn | | 13 | |
| National | Mark Mitchell | | 11 | |
| Labour | Estefania Muller-Pallares | | 55 | |
| Green | Lorraine Newman | | 42 | |
| NZ Loyal | Jeanette Wilson | Selected to contest Mount Albert for New Zealand Public Party in 2020 but withdrew | | |
Retiring incumbents and withdrawn candidates
| DemocracyNZ | Bill Dyet | | | |
| NZ First | Janina Massee | Announced, but not on final list of candidates | | |

=== Whangārei ===
2023 general election: Whangārei
| Notes: | Blue background denotes an incumbent. Pink background denotes a current list MP. Yellow background denotes a retiring MP. | | | |
| Party | Candidate | Notes | List # | Source |
|---|---|---|---|---|
| NZ Loyal | Janita Andrews | | | |
| Green | Rick Bazeley | | 30 | |
| NZ First | Gavin Benney | | 14 | |
| ACT | Susy Bretherton | | 39 | |
| DemocracyNZ | Diana Burgess | | 8 | |
| Legalise Cannabis | Jeni de Jong | Contested electorate in 2020 | 6 | |
| Independent | Fiona Green | | | |
| National | Shane Reti | MP for Whangārei 2014–2020 | 4 | |
| Labour | Angie Warren-Clark | Contested Bay of Plenty in 2020 | 43 | |
Retiring incumbents and withdrawn candidates
| Labour | Emily Henderson | | | |

=== Wigram ===
2023 general election: Wigram
| Notes: | Blue background denotes an incumbent. Pink background denotes a current list MP. Yellow background denotes a retiring MP. | | | |
| Party | Candidate | Notes | List # | Source |
|---|---|---|---|---|
| Legalise Cannabis | Blair Anderson | | 10 | |
| Leighton Baker Party | Debra Cullimore | | 3 | |
| Economic Euthenics | Tubby Hansen | Contested electorate in 2020 | | |
| ACT | Ankita Lynn | | 57 | |
| Independent | Geoff McTague | Contested electorate in 2020 | | |
| National | Tracy Summerfield | | 37 | |
| Independent | Wiremu Thomson | | | |
| NZ Loyal | Christine Van Duivenboden | | | |
| Green | Richard Wesley | Contested electorate in 2020 | 27 | |
| Labour | Megan Woods | | 5 | |

== Māori electorates ==
=== Hauraki-Waikato ===
2023 general election: Hauraki-Waikato
| Notes: | Blue background denotes an incumbent. Pink background denotes a current list MP. Yellow background denotes a retiring MP. | | | |
| Party | Candidate | Notes | List # | Source |
|---|---|---|---|---|
| Labour | Nanaia Mahuta | | none | |
| Te Pāti Māori | Hana-Rawhiti Maipi-Clarke | | 4 | |
| Outdoors | Donna Pokere-Phillips | Contested electorate for Te Pāti Māori in 2020; contested Hamilton West in 2022 | | |

=== Ikaroa-Rāwhiti ===
2023 general election: Ikaroa-Rāwhiti
| Notes: | Blue background denotes an incumbent. Pink background denotes a current list MP. Yellow background denotes a retiring MP. | | | |
| Party | Candidate | Notes | List # | Source |
|---|---|---|---|---|
| Labour | Cushla Tangaere-Manuel | | none | |
| Vision NZ | Ata Tuhakaraina | | | |
| Te Pāti Māori | Meka Whaitiri | Labour MP from 2013–2023 | 3 | |
Retiring incumbents and withdrawn candidates
| Te Pāti Māori | Heather Te Au-Skipworth | Withdrew upon Whaitiri's defection to Te Pāti Māori; later selected for Tukituki, subsequently withdrew altogether | | |

=== Tāmaki Makaurau ===
2023 general election: Tāmaki Makaurau
| Notes: | Blue background denotes an incumbent. Pink background denotes a current list MP. Yellow background denotes a retiring MP. | | | |
| Party | Candidate | Notes | List # | Source |
|---|---|---|---|---|
| Labour | Peeni Henare | | 14 | |
| Te Pāti Māori | Takutai Tarsh Kemp | | 6 | |
| Vision NZ | Hannah Tamaki | Contested Waiariki in 2020 | | |
| Green | Darleen Tana | Contested Northland in 2020 | 13 | |
| National | Hinurewa te Hau | Contested Upper Harbour for Te Pāti Māori in 2014 | 38 | |

=== Te Tai Hauāuru ===
2023 general election: Te Tai Hauāuru
| Notes: | Blue background denotes an incumbent. Pink background denotes a current list MP. Yellow background denotes a retiring MP. | | | |
| Party | Candidate | Notes | List # | Source |
|---|---|---|---|---|
| National | Harete Hipango | MP for Whanganui 2017–2020 | 31 | |
| Te Pāti Māori | Debbie Ngarewa-Packer | Contested electorate in 2020 | 1 | |
| Labour | Soraya Peke-Mason | Contested electorate in 2011; contested Rangitīkei in 2020 | none | |
| Vision NZ | Paris Winiata | Contested Hutt South in 2020 | | |
Retiring incumbents and withdrawn candidates
| Labour | Adrian Rurawhe | Contesting list only | | |

=== Te Tai Tokerau ===
2023 general election: Te Tai Tokerau
| Notes: | Blue background denotes an incumbent. Pink background denotes a current list MP. Yellow background denotes a retiring MP. | | | |
| Party | Candidate | Notes | List # | Source |
|---|---|---|---|---|
| Labour | Kelvin Davis | | 2 | |
| Legalise Cannabis | Maki Herbert | Contested electorate in 2020 | 2 | |
| Te Pāti Māori | Mariameno Kapa-Kingi | Contested electorate in 2020 | 7 | |
| Green | Hūhana Lyndon | | 10 | |
| Independent | Paturiri Toautu | Contested electorate in 2020 under the name Moemoea Mohoawhenua | | |

=== Te Tai Tonga ===
2023 general election: Te Tai Tonga
| Notes: | Blue background denotes an incumbent. Pink background denotes a current list MP. Yellow background denotes a retiring MP. | | | |
| Party | Candidate | Notes | List # | Source |
|---|---|---|---|---|
| Te Pāti Māori | Tākuta Ferris | Contested electorate in 2020 | 5 | |
| Independent | Geoffrey Karena Fuimaono Puhi | | | |
| Legalise Cannabis | Rebecca Rae Robin | | | |
| Labour | Rino Tirikatene | | 21 | |

=== Waiariki ===
2023 general election: Waiariki
| Notes: | Blue background denotes an incumbent. Pink background denotes a current list MP. Yellow background denotes a retiring MP. | | | |
| Party | Candidate | Notes | List # | Source |
|---|---|---|---|---|
| Labour | Toni Boynton | | 39 | |
| Vision NZ | Charles Hunia | | | |
| Te Pāti Māori | Rawiri Waititi | | 2 | |
