= List of appointments to the New Zealand House of Representatives =

This is a list of appointments to the New Zealand House of Representatives, which is the sole house of the New Zealand Parliament, filling vacancies of List MPs, from the first election to be held under the mixed-member proportional (MMP) electoral system in 1996 until the present day.

Vacancies can be caused in several ways:

- The resignation of a List MP
- The death of a List MP
- The expulsion of a List MP
- The election of a sitting List MP to an electorate seat

== List of appointments ==
45th Parliament (1996–1999)
Date	Incumbent	Party	Cause	Appointee	Party	Source
23 April 1997	Jim Gerard	National	Resignation	Annabel Young	National	
24 November 1998	Jill White	Labour	Resignation	Helen Duncan	Labour	
16 February 1999	Deborah Morris	Independent	Resignation	Gilbert Myles	NZ First	
16 February 1999	Paul East	National	Resignation	Alec Neill	National	
46th Parliament (1999–2002)
Date	Incumbent	Party	Cause	Appointee	Party	Source
15 March 2000	Don McKinnon	National	Resignation	Arthur Anae	National	
13 February 2001	Simon Upton	National	Resignation	Alec Neill	National	
47th Parliament (2002–2005)
Date	Incumbent	Party	Cause	Appointee	Party	Source
29 July 2003	Graham Kelly	Labour	Resignation	Moana Mackey	Labour	
30 November 2004	Donna Awatere Huata	Independent	Expulsion	Kenneth Wang	ACT	
5 April 2005	Jonathan Hunt	Labour	Resignation	Lesley Soper	Labour	
48th Parliament (2005–2008)
Date	Incumbent	Party	Cause	Appointee	Party	Source
15 November 2005	Rod Donald	Green	Death	Nándor Tánczos	Green	
1 August 2006	Jim Sutton	Labour	Resignation	Charles Chauvel	Labour	
13 February 2007	Don Brash	National	Resignation	Katrina Shanks	National	
20 February 2007	Georgina Beyer	Labour	Resignation	Lesley Soper	Labour	
19 February 2008	Brian Donnelly	NZ First	Resignation	Dail Jones	NZ First	
4 March 2008	Ann Hartley	Labour	Resignation	Louisa Wall	Labour	
1 April 2008	Dianne Yates	Labour	Resignation	William Sio	Labour	
1 July 2008	Nándor Tánczos	Green	Resignation	Russel Norman	Green	
49th Parliament (2008–2011)
Date	Incumbent	Party	Cause	Appointee	Party	Source
5 May 2009	Michael Cullen	Labour	Resignation	Damien O'Connor	Labour	
17 June 2009	Richard Worth	National	Resignation	Cam Calder	National	
17 November 2009	Sue Bradford	Green	Resignation	David Clendon	Green	
16 February 2010	Jeanette Fitzsimons	Green	Resignation	Gareth Hughes	Green	
12 October 2010	David Garrett	ACT	Resignation	Hilary Calvert	ACT	
12 April 2011	Darren Hughes	Labour	Resignation	Louisa Wall	Labour	
50th Parliament (2011–2014)
Date	Incumbent	Party	Cause	Appointee	Party	Source
19 February 2013	Lockwood Smith	National	Resignation	Aaron Gilmore	National	
13 March 2013	Charles Chauvel	Labour	Resignation	Carol Beaumont	Labour	
28 May 2013	Jackie Blue	National	Resignation	Paul Foster-Bell	National	
29 May 2013	Aaron Gilmore	National	Resignation	Claudette Hauiti	National	
28 January 2014	Katrina Shanks	National	Resignation	Jo Hayes	National	
27 May 2014	Shane Jones	Labour	Resignation	Kelvin Davis	Labour	
51st Parliament (2014–2017)
Date	Incumbent	Party	Cause	Appointee	Party	Source
28 April 2015	Winston Peters	NZ First	Elected to electorate seat	Ria Bond	NZ First	
3 November 2015	Russel Norman	Green	Resignation	Marama Davidson	Green	
9 February 2016	Tim Groser	National	Resignation	Maureen Pugh	National	
7 October 2016	Kevin Hague	Green	Resignation	Barry Coates	Green	
16 March 2017	Jacinda Ardern	Labour	Elected to electorate seat	Raymond Huo	Labour	
52nd Parliament (2017–2020)
Date	Incumbent	Party	Cause	Appointee	Party	Source
20 March 2018	Bill English	National	Resignation	Maureen Pugh	National	
3 April 2018	Steven Joyce	National	Resignation	Nicola Willis	National	
12 February 2019	Chris Finlayson	National	Resignation	Agnes Loheni	National	
16 May 2019	Nuk Korako	National	Resignation	Paulo Garcia	National	
53rd Parliament (2020–2023)
Date	Incumbent	Party	Cause	Appointee	Party	Source
11 June 2021	Nick Smith	National	Resignation	Harete Hipango	National	
1 May 2022	Louisa Wall	Labour	Resignation	Lemauga Lydia Sosene	Labour	
25 July 2022	Kris Faafoi	Labour	Resignation	Dan Rosewarne	Labour	
25 October 2022	Trevor Mallard	Labour	Resignation	Soraya Peke-Mason	Labour	
54th Parliament (2023–present)
Date	Incumbent	Party	Cause	Appointee	Party	Source
6 December 2023	Andrew Little	Labour	Resignation	Camilla Belich	Labour	
14 December 2023	Andrew Bayly	National	Elected to electorate seat	Nancy Lu	National	
19 January 2024	Golriz Ghahraman	Green	Resignation	Celia Wade-Brown	Green	
29 January 2024	Rino Tirikatene	Labour	Resignation	Tracey McLellan	Labour	
7 February 2024	Kelvin Davis	Labour	Resignation	Shanan Halbert	Labour	
6 March 2024	Efeso Collins	Green	Death	Lawrence Xu-Nan	Green	
25 March 2024	Grant Robertson	Labour	Resignation	Glen Bennett	Labour	
6 May 2024	James Shaw	Green	Resignation	Francisco Hernandez	Green	
22 October 2024	Darleen Tana	Independent	Expulsion	Benjamin Doyle	Green	
12 May 2025	David Parker	Labour	Resignation	Vanushi Walters	Labour	
30 June 2025	Tanya Unkovich	NZ First	Resignation	David Wilson	NZ First	
6 October 2025	Benjamin Doyle	Green	Resignation	Mike Davidson	Green	
9 February 2026	Adrian Rurawhe	Labour	Resignation	Georgie Dansey	Labour	
16 March 2026	Peeni Henare	Labour	Resignation	Dan Rosewarne	Labour	
