= Party lists in the 2023 New Zealand general election =

New Zealand political candidates in the MMP era
Year	Party list	Candidates
1996	party lists	by electorate
1999	party lists	by electorate
2002	party lists	by electorate
2005	party lists	by electorate
2008	party lists	by electorate
2011	party lists	by electorate
2014	party lists	by electorate
2017	party lists	by electorate
2020	party lists	by electorate
2023	party lists	by electorate
2026	party lists	by electorate

The 2023 New Zealand general election was held on Saturday, 14 October 2023 to determine the membership of the 54th New Zealand Parliament. This page lists candidates by party, including their ranking on a list. Full official lists were published on 16 September.

== Successful parties ==
Names in bold are incumbent MPs.

=== ACT Party ===
ACT New Zealand released their list on 16 July 2023. Anto Coates, 33rd on the list, withdrew in July. Elaine Naidu Franz, 29th on the list, stood down on 23 August due to controversial social media comments. Brent Miles, 57th on the list, and contesting Taranaki-King Country, withdrew in September for "personal reasons". ACT's Port Waikato candidate Neil Christensen died during the early voting period, triggering a by-election in the electorate.

Rank	Name	Incumbency	Contesting electorate	Previous rank	Change	Initial results	Later changes
1	**David Seymour**	Electorate	Epsom	1	0	✓ Won Epsom	
2	**Brooke van Velden**	List	Tāmaki	2	0	✓ Won Tāmaki	
3	**Nicole McKee**	List	Rongotai	3	0	✓ Elected from list	
4	Todd Stephenson		Southland	—	—	✓ Elected from list	
5	Andrew Hoggard		Rangitīkei	—	—	✓ Elected from list	
6	**Karen Chhour**	List	Upper Harbour	7	+1	✓ Elected from list	
7	**Mark Cameron**	List	Northland	8	+1	✓ Elected from list	
8	**Simon Court**	List	Te Atatū	5	−3	✓ Elected from list	
9	Parmjeet Parmar	(Former MP)	Pakuranga	(National: 27)	+18	✓ Elected from list	
10	Laura Trask		Banks Peninsula	—	—	✓ Elected from list	
11	Cameron Luxton		Bay of Plenty	15	+4	✓ Elected from list	
12	Antonia Modkova		Panmure-Ōtāhuhu	—	—		
13	Ash Parmar		Hamilton East	—	—		
14	**Toni Severin**	List	Christchurch East	9	−5	✗ Lost seat	
15	Ben Harvey		Selwyn	—	—		
16	Rob Douglas		Tukituki	—	—		
17	**Chris Baillie**	List	Nelson	4	−13	✗ Lost seat	
18	Christine Young		Tauranga	—	—		
19	Zane Cozens		Taupō	—	—		
20	Leo Foley		Northcote	—	—		
21	Anna Yallop		North Shore	—	—		
22	Lily Brown		Mana	—	—		
23	Mike McCormick		Papakura	45	+22		
24	Andy Parkins		Hutt South	20	−4		
25	Felix Poole		Maungakiekie	50	+25		
26	Rahul Chopra		Mount Roskill	—	—		
27	Michael Howe		East Coast	—	—		
28	Ollie Murphy		Mount Albert	—	—		
29	Keith Griffiths		Kaikōura	—	—		
30	Rae Ah Chee		Takanini	—	—		
31	Susan Stevenson		Hamilton West	—	—		
32	Michael McCook		East Coast Bays	44	+12		
33	Juan Alvarez de Lugo		New Lynn	—	—		
34	Pawel Milewski		Napier	—	—		
35	Neil Christensen†		Port Waikato	—	—		
36	Dion Anderson			—	—		
37	Simon Angelo		Whangaparāoa	—	—		
38	Sean Beamish		Waitaki	23	−15		
39	Susy Bretherton		Whangārei	—	—		
40	Ross Campbell		Waimakariri	—	—		
41	Simon Casey		Wairarapa	—	—		
42	Jake Curran		Kelston	—	—		
43	Scott Donaldson		Invercargill	—	—		
44	Matthew Fisken		Christchurch Central	—	—		
45	Mike Harnett		Palmerston North	—	—		
46	Pothen Joseph		Mangere	—	—		
47	Kelly Lilley		West Coast-Tasman	—	—		
48	Kevin Matthews			—	—		
49	Burty Meffan		Taieri	—	—		
50	Marten Rozeboom		Rotorua	—	—		
51	Sean Rush		Ōtaki	—	—		
52	Craig Dredge		Whanganui	—	—		
53	Tim Newman		Dunedin	—	—		
54	Bo Burns		Botany	—	—		
55	Joanna Verburg		Coromandel	—	—		
56	Ankita Lynn		Wigram	—	—		
57	Brent Bailey		Kaipara ki Mahurangi	—	—		
58	Margo Onishchenko		Maungakiekie	—	—		
59	Michael Hurle		Remutaka	—	—		
60	Paul Day		Ōhāriu	—	—		
61	Bruce McGechan		New Plymouth	—	—		

=== Green Party ===
The Green Party has a two-stage process to determine its party list: an initial list determined by attendees of the annual Green Party conference and then a vote and ordering by members of the party to either uphold the list or generate a different list voted on by the party. The party claims this process is the "most democratic list selection process in the country". The initial list was published on 3 April 2023.

Rank	Name	Incumbency	Contesting electorate	Previous rank	Change	Initial results	Later changes
1	**Marama Davidson**	List		1	0		
2	**James Shaw**	List		2	0		
3	**Chlöe Swarbrick**	Electorate	Auckland Central	3	0		
4	**Elizabeth Kerekere**	List		9	+5		
5	**Julie Anne Genter**	List	Rongotai	4	−1		
6	**Teanau Tuiono**	List	Palmerston North	8	+2		
7	**Ricardo Menéndez March**	List	Mount Albert	10	+3		
8	Hūhana Lyndon		Te Tai Tokerau	—	—		
9	**Golriz Ghahraman**	List		7	−2		
10	Lan Pham		Banks Peninsula	—	—		
11	Steve Abel		New Lynn	11	0		
12	Efeso Collins			—	—		
13	Darleen Tana			42	+29		
14	Kahurangi Carter			—	—		
15	Lawrence Xu-Nan			17	+2		
16	Benjamin Doyle		Hamilton West	—	—		
17	Francisco Hernandez		Dunedin	—	—		
18	Scott Willis		Taieri	13	−5		
19	Stephanie Rodgers		Ōhāriu	—	—		
20	Suveen Sanis Walgampola			—	—		
21	Gina Dao-McLay		Mana	—	—		
22	Celia Wade-Brown		Wairarapa	—	—		
23	Reina Tuai Penney			—	—		
24	Mike Davidson			—	—		
25	David Kennedy			—	—		
26	Nick Ratcliffe			—	—		
27	Rochelle Francis			—	—		
28	Sapna Samant			—	—		
29	Alec McNeil		Kaikōura	—	—		
30	Richard Wesley			44	+14		
31	Neelu Jennings		Hutt South	—	—		
32	Kair Lippiatt			—	—		

A finalised list was released on 20 May. (Note: Elizabeth Kerekere resigned from her position as a current list MP in May 2023 during the list ranking process and will not stand for the Green Party in the 2023 election.) On 15 June Alec McNeil, previously ranked 26th on the list, withdrew from the list. Rochelle Francis (#29 on the final list) withdrew from the election in late August, leaving the party with no candidate for the Invercargill electorate. Also by late August, Kair Lippiatt (#31 on the final list; list-only) was no longer listed on the Green Party website as one of their candidates.

Rank	Name	Portrait	Incumbency	Contesting electorate	Previous rank	Change	Initial results	Later changes
1	**Marama Davidson**		List		1	0	✓ Elected from list	
2	**James Shaw**		List		2	0	✓ Elected from list	✗ Left parliament in 2024
3	**Chlöe Swarbrick**		Electorate	Auckland Central	3	0	✓ Won Auckland Central	
4	**Julie Anne Genter**		List	Rongotai	4	0	✓ Won Rongotai	
5	**Teanau Tuiono**		List	Palmerston North	8	+3	✓ Elected from list	
6	Lan Pham			Banks Peninsula	—	—	✓ Elected from list	
7	**Golriz Ghahraman**		List	Kelston	7	0	✓ Elected from list	✗ Left parliament in 2024
8	**Ricardo Menéndez March**		List	Mount Albert	10	+2	✓ Elected from list	
9	Steve Abel			New Lynn	11	+2	✓ Elected from list	
10	Hūhana Lyndon			Te Tai Tokerau	—	—	✓ Elected from list	
11	Efeso Collins			Panmure-Ōtāhuhu	—	—	✓ Elected from list	✗ Died in 2024
12	Scott Willis			Taieri	13	+1	✓ Elected from list	
13	Darleen Tana			Tāmaki Makaurau	42	+29	✓ Elected from list	✗ Left parliament in 2024
14	Kahurangi Carter			Christchurch Central	—	—	✓ Elected from list	
15	Celia Wade-Brown			Wairarapa	—	—		✓ Replaced Golriz Ghahraman in 2024
16	Lawrence Xu-Nan			Epsom	17	+1		✓ Replaced Efeso Collins in 2024
17	Francisco Hernandez			Dunedin	—	—		✓ Replaced James Shaw in 2024
18	Benjamin Doyle			Hamilton West	—	—		✓ Replaced Darleen Tana in 2024. ✗ Left parliament in 2025
19	Mike Davidson			Ilam	—	—		✓ Replaced Benjamin Doyle in 2025
20	Stephanie Rodgers			Ōhāriu	—	—		
21	Suveen Sanis Walgampola			Mount Roskill	—	—		
22	David Kennedy			Southland	—	—		
23	Gina Dao-McLay			Mana	—	—		
24	Reina Tuai Penney			Northland	—	—		
25	Nick Ratcliffe			Tukituki	—	—		
26	Richard Wesley			Wigram	44	+18		
27	Neelu Jennings			Hutt South	—	—		
28	Sapna Samant			Maungakiekie	—	—		
29	Pat Baskett			North Shore	—	—		
30	Rick Bazeley			Whangārei	—	—		
31	Zephyr Brown			Kaipara ki Mahurangi	28	−3		
32	Justin Crooks			Tauranga	—	—		
33	Thea Doyle			Upper Harbour	—	—		
34	Barbara Gilchrist			Rangitata	—	—		
35	Pamela Grealey			Coromandel	32	−3		
36	Pleasance Hansen			Waitaki	—	—		
37	Bernard Long			Rangitīkei	—	—		
38	Matthew Macmillan			Bay of Plenty	—	—		
39	Richard McCubbin			Kaikōura	35	−4		
40	Ali Muhammad			Ōtaki	—	—		
41	Zooey Neumann			Te Atatū	—	—		
42	Lorraine Newman			Whangaparāoa	—	—		
43	Chris Norton			Remutaka	36	−7		
44	George O'Connor Patena			Taupō	—	—		
45	Steve Richards			West Coast-Tasman	39	−6		
46	Marion Sanson			Whanganui	—	—		
47	Andrew Shaw			Northcote	—	—		
48	Peter Sykes			Māngere	—	—		
49	Jordan Walker			East Coast	—	—		
—	Tamatha Paul			Wellington Central	—	—	✓ Won Wellington Central	

=== Labour Party ===
The Labour Party released its list on 31 July 2023.

Rank	Name	Portrait	Incumbency	Contesting electorate	Previous rank	Change	Initial results	Later changes
1	**Chris Hipkins**		Electorate	Remutaka	6	+5	✓ Won Remutaka	
2	**Kelvin Davis**		Electorate	Te Tai Tokerau	2	0	✓ Elected from list	✗ Left parliament in 2024
3	**Carmel Sepuloni**		Electorate	Kelston	8	+5	✓ Won Kelston	
4	**Grant Robertson**		Electorate		3	−1	✓ Elected from list	✗ Left parliament in 2024
5	**Megan Woods**		Electorate	Wigram	5	0	✓ Won Wigram	
6	**Jan Tinetti**		List	Tauranga	32	+26	✓ Elected from list	
7	**Ayesha Verrall**		List		17	+10	✓ Elected from list	
8	**Willie Jackson**		List		19	+11	✓ Elected from list	
9	**Willow-Jean Prime**		Electorate	Northland	36	+27	✓ Elected from list	
10	**Damien O'Connor**		Electorate	West Coast-Tasman	14	+4	✓ Elected from list	
11	**Adrian Rurawhe**		Electorate		24	+13	✓ Elected from list	✗ Left parliament in 2026
12	**Andrew Little**		List		7	−5	✓ Elected from list	✗ Left parliament in 2023
13	**David Parker**		List		9	−4	✓ Elected from list	✗ Left parliament in 2025
14	**Peeni Henare**		Electorate	Tāmaki Makaurau	18	+4	✓ Elected from list	✗ Left parliament in 2026
15	**Priyanca Radhakrishnan**		Electorate	Maungakiekie	31	+16	✓ Elected from list	
16	**Kieran McAnulty**		Electorate	Wairarapa	26	+10	✓ Elected from list	
17	**Ginny Andersen**		Electorate	Hutt South	45	+28	✓ Elected from list	
18	**Barbara Edmonds**		Electorate	Mana	49	+31	✓ Won Mana	
19	**Jo Luxton**		Electorate	Rangitata	39	+20	✓ Elected from list	
20	**Duncan Webb**		Electorate	Christchurch Central	43	+23	✓ Won Christchurch Central	
21	**Rino Tirikatene**		Electorate	Te Tai Tonga	29	+8	✓ Elected from list	✗ Left parliament in 2024
22	**Deborah Russell**		Electorate	New Lynn	33	+11	✓ Elected from list	
23	**Rachel Brooking**		List	Dunedin	46	+23	✓ Won Dunedin	
24	**Jenny Salesa**		Electorate	Panmure-Ōtāhuhu	13	−11	✓ Won Panmure-Ōtāhuhu	
25	**Tangi Utikere**		Electorate	Palmerston North	—	—	✓ Won Palmerston North	
26	**Camilla Belich**		List	Epsom	30	+4	✗ Lost seat	✓ Replaced Andrew Little in 2023
27	**Tracey McLellan**		Electorate	Banks Peninsula	53	+26	✗ Lost seat	✓ Replaced Rino Tirikatene in 2024
28	**Shanan Halbert**		Electorate	Northcote	51	+23	✗ Lost seat	✓ Replaced Kelvin Davis in 2024
29	**Glen Bennett**		Electorate	New Plymouth	72	+43	✗ Lost seat	✓ Replaced Grant Robertson in 2024
30	**Vanushi Walters**		Electorate	Upper Harbour	22	−8	✗ Lost seat	✓ Replaced David Parker in 2025
31	Georgie Dansey			Hamilton East	81	+50		✓ Replaced Adrian Rurawhe in 2026
32	**Dan Rosewarne**		List	Waimakariri	56	+24	✗ Lost seat	✓ Replaced Peeni Henare in 2026
33	**Naisi Chen**		List	East Coast Bays	38	+5	✗ Lost seat	
34	**Anahila Kanongata'a**		List	Papakura	44	+10	✗ Lost seat	
35	**Angela Roberts**		List	Taranaki-King Country	50	+15	✗ Lost seat	
36	**Tāmati Coffey**		List	East Coast	37	+1	✗ Lost seat	
37	**Ibrahim Omer**		List	Wellington Central	42	+5	✗ Lost seat	
38	**Neru Leavasa**		Electorate	Takanini	52	+14	✗ Lost seat	
39	Toni Boynton			Waiariki	—	—		
40	**Anna Lorck**		Electorate	Tukituki	—	—	✗ Lost seat	
41	George Hampton			North Shore	—	—		
42	**Rachel Boyack**		Electorate	Nelson	57	+15	✓ Won Nelson	
43	**Angie Warren-Clark**		List	Whangārei	35	−8	✗ Lost seat	
44	**Liz Craig**		List	Invercargill	41	−3	✗ Lost seat	
45	**Michael Wood**		Electorate	Mount Roskill	23	−22	✗ Lost seat	
46	**Terisa Ngobi**		Electorate	Ōtaki	65	+19	✗ Lost seat	
47	**Helen White**		List	Mount Albert	48	+1	✓ Won Mount Albert	
48	**Arena Williams**		Electorate	Manurewa	58	+10	✓ Won Manurewa	
49	**Phil Twyford**		Electorate	Te Atatū	4	−45	✓ Won Te Atatū	
50	**Steph Lewis**		Electorate	Whanganui	55	+5	✗ Lost seat	
51	**Sarah Pallett**		Electorate	Ilam	62	+11	✗ Lost seat	
52	**Ingrid Leary**		Electorate	Taieri	59	+7	✓ Won Taieri	
53	**Lemauga Lydia Sosene**		List	Māngere	54	+1	✓ Won Māngere	
54	Pare Taikato			Bay of Plenty	—	—		
55	Estefania Muller-Pallarès			Whangaparāoa	—	—		
56	Fleur Fitzsimons			Rongotai	—	—		
57	Reuben Davidson			Christchurch East	67	+10	✓ Won Christchurch East	
58	Nick Ruane				—	—		
59	Fesaitu Solomone			Tāmaki	—	—		
60	Mark Hutchinson			Napier	—	—		
61	Nerissa Henry			Pakuranga	77	+16		
62	Myra Williamson			Hamilton West	—	—		
63	Oscar Sims			Auckland Central	—	—		
64	Ala' Al-Bustanji			Taupō	71	+7		
65	Gwendoline Keel			Port Waikato	—	—		
66	Kharag Singh			Botany	—	—		
67	Emma Dewhirst			Kaikōura	—	—		
68	Zulfiqar Butt			Rangitīkei	—	—		
69	Ben Sandford			Rotorua	—	—		
70	Simon McCallum			Southland	—	—		
71	Guy Wishart			Kaipara ki Mahurangi	—	—		
72	Deborah Rhodes				—	—		
73	Jamie Toko			Waikato	—	—		
74	Luke Jones			Selwyn	—	—		
75	Beryl Riley			Coromandel	—	—		
76	Ethan Reille			Waitaki	—	—		
—	**Nanaia Mahuta**		Electorate	Hauraki-Waikato	10	—	✗ Lost seat	
—	**Greg O'Connor**		Electorate	Ōhāriu	—	—	✓ Won Ōhāriu	
—	**Soraya Peke-Mason**		List	Te Tai Hauāuru	60	—	✗ Lost seat	
—	Cushla Tangaere-Manuel			Ikaroa-Rawhiti	—	—	✓ Won Ikaroa-Rawhiti	

=== National Party ===
The National Party released its list on 19 August 2023.

Rank	Name	Portrait	Incumbency	Contesting electorate	Previous rank	Change	Initial results	Later changes
1	**Christopher Luxon**		Electorate	Botany	61	+60	✓ Won Botany	
2	**Nicola Willis**		List	Ōhāriu	13	+11	✓ Elected from list	
3	**Chris Bishop**		List	Hutt South	7	+4	✓ Won Hutt South	
4	**Shane Reti**		List	Whangārei	5	+1	✓ Won Whangārei	
5	**Paul Goldsmith**		List	Epsom	3	−2	✓ Elected from list	
6	**Louise Upston**		Electorate	Taupō	9	+3	✓ Won Taupō	
7	**Erica Stanford**		Electorate	East Coast Bays	39	+32	✓ Won East Coast Bays	
8	**Matt Doocey**		Electorate	Waimakariri	31	+23	✓ Won Waimakariri	
9	**Simeon Brown**		Electorate	Pakuranga	37	+28	✓ Won Pakuranga	
10	**Judith Collins**		Electorate	Papakura	1	−9	✓ Won Papakura	
11	**Mark Mitchell**		Electorate	Whangaparāoa	15	+4	✓ Won Whangaparāoa	
12	**Todd McClay**		Electorate	Rotorua	6	−6	✓ Won Rotorua	
13	**Melissa Lee**		List	Mount Albert	16	+3	✓ Elected from list	
14	**Gerry Brownlee**		List		2	−12	✓ Elected from list	
15	**Andrew Bayly**		Electorate	Port Waikato	17	+2	✓ Elected from list	✓ Replaced a vacancy in the 2023 Port Waikato by-election
16	**Penny Simmonds**		Electorate	Invercargill	63	+47	✓ Won Invercargill	
17	**Simon Watts**		Electorate	North Shore	65	+48	✓ Won North Shore	
18	**Chris Penk**		Electorate	Kaipara ki Mahurangi	41	+23	✓ Won Kaipara ki Mahurangi	
19	**Nicola Grigg**		Electorate	Selwyn	60	+41	✓ Won Selwyn	
20	Nancy Lu				26	+6		✓ Replaced Andrew Bayly (in his role as list MP) in 2023
21	Suze Redmayne			Rangitīkei	—	—	✓ Won Rangitīkei	
22	Katie Nimon			Napier	45	+23	✓ Won Napier	
23	Catherine Wedd			Tukituki	—	—	✓ Won Tukituki	
24	**Tama Potaka**		Electorate	Hamilton West	—	—	✓ Won Hamilton West	
25	Agnes Loheni		(Former MP)		28	+3		
26	**Maureen Pugh**		List	West Coast-Tasman	19	−7	✓ Won West Coast-Tasman	
27	Emma Chatterton			Remutaka	—	—		
28	James Christmas				—	—		
29	Dale Stephens			Christchurch Central	29	0		
30	Siva Kilari			Manurewa	—	—		
31	**Harete Hipango**		List	Te Tai Hauāuru	21	−10	✗ Lost seat	
32	Rosemary Bourke			Māngere	—	—		
33	Frances Hughes			Mana	—	—		
34	Paulo Garcia		(Former MP)	New Lynn	25	−9	✓ Won New Lynn	
35	Blair Cameron			Nelson	—	—		
36	**Barbara Kuriger**		Electorate	Taranaki-King Country	20	−16	✓ Won Taranaki-King Country	
37	Tracy Summerfield			Wigram	—	—		
38	Hinurewa te Hau			Tāmaki Makaurau	—	—		
39	Angee Nicholas			Te Atatū	—	—		
40	Vanessa Weenink			Banks Peninsula	—	—	✓ Won Banks Peninsula	
41	Rima Nakhle			Takanini	50	+9	✓ Won Takanini	
42	Ruby Schaumkel			Kelston	—	—		
43	Mahesh Muralidhar			Auckland Central	—	—		
44	Dana Kirkpatrick			East Coast	—	—	✓ Won East Coast	
45	Scott Sheeran			Wellington Central	—	—		
46	Navtej Singh Randhawa			Panmure-Ōtāhuhu	—	—		
47	Carl Bates			Whanganui	—	—	✓ Won Whanganui	
48	Carlos Cheung			Mount Roskill	—	—	✓ Won Mount Roskill	
49	Matthew French			Taieri	—	—		
50	Matt Stock			Christchurch East	—	—		
51	Karunā Muthu			Rongotai	—	—		
52	Ankit Bansal			Palmerston North	—	—		
53	**Joseph Mooney**		Electorate	Southland	62	+9	✓ Won Southland	
54	**Simon O'Connor**		Electorate	Tāmaki	35	−19	✗ Lost seat	
55	**Scott Simpson**		Electorate	Coromandel	10	−45	✓ Won Coromandel	
56	**Stuart Smith**		Electorate	Kaikōura	32	−24	✓ Won Kaikōura	
57	**Sam Uffindell**		Electorate	Tauranga	—	—	✓ Won Tauranga	
58	**Tim van de Molen**		Electorate	Waikato	42	−16	✓ Won Waikato	
59	Miles Anderson			Waitaki	—	—	✓ Won Waitaki	
60	Dan Bidois		(Former MP)	Northcote	43	−17	✓ Won Northcote	
61	Mike Butterick			Wairarapa	58	−3	✓ Won Wairarapa	
62	Cameron Brewer			Upper Harbour	—	—	✓ Won Upper Harbour	
63	Hamish Campbell			Ilam	47	−16	✓ Won Ilam	
64	Tim Costley			Ōtaki	59	−5	✓ Won Ōtaki	
65	Greg Fleming			Maungakiekie	—	—	✓ Won Maungakiekie	
66	Ryan Hamilton			Hamilton East	—	—	✓ Won Hamilton East	
67	David MacLeod			New Plymouth	—	—	✓ Won New Plymouth	
68	Grant McCallum			Northland	—	—	✓ Won Northland	
69	James Meager			Rangitata	—	—	✓ Won Rangitata	
70	Tom Rutherford			Bay of Plenty	—	—	✓ Won Bay of Plenty	
71	Felicity Foy				—	—		
72	Janelle Hocking				—	—		
73	Kesh Naidoo-Rauf				—	—		
74	Senthuran Arulanantham				—	—		
—	**Michael Woodhouse**		List	Dunedin	12	—	✗ Lost seat	

=== New Zealand First ===
New Zealand First released its list on 16 September 2023.

Rank	Name	Incumbency	Contesting electorate	Previous rank	Change	Initial results	Later changes
1	Winston Peters	(Former MP)		1	0	✓ Elected from list	
2	Shane Jones	(Former MP)	Northland	4	+2	✓ Elected from list	
3	Casey Costello		Port Waikato	—	—	✓ Elected from list	
4	Mark Patterson	(Former MP)	Taieri	7	+3	✓ Elected from list	
5	Jenny Marcroft	(Former MP)	Kaipara ki Mahurangi	17	+12	✓ Elected from list	
6	Jamie Arbuckle		Kaikōura	13	+7	✓ Elected from list	
7	Andy Foster		Mana	—	—	✓ Elected from list	
8	Tanya Unkovich		Epsom	—	—	✓ Elected from list	✗ Left parliament in 2025
9	David Wilson		Upper Harbour	9	0		✓ Replaced Tanya Unkovich in 2025
10	Erika Harvey		Tauranga	11	+1		
11	Kirsten Murfitt		Bay of Plenty	—	—		
12	Lee Donoghue		Hutt South	—	—		
13	Stu Husband		Waikato	16	+3		
14	Gavin Benney		Whangārei	—	—		
15	Anne Degia-Pala		Kelston	24	+9		
16	Robert Ballantyne		Rangitata	—	—		
17	Helma Vermeulen		Rangitīkei	—	—		
18	Laurie Turnbull		Napier	—	—		
19	Taylor Arneil		Wellington Central	23	+4		
20	Keegan Langeveld		Dunedin	—	—		
21	Tira Pehi		Taupō	—	—		
22	Shane Wiremu		Christchurch East	—	—		
23	Mark Arneil		Christchurch Central	14	−9		
24	Michelle Warren		Northcote	—	—		
25	Robert Monds		Papakura	27	+2		
26	Kevin Stone		Hamilton West	—	—		
27	Jackie Farrelly		West Coast-Tasman	21	−6		
28	Geoff Mills		Rongotai	—	—		
29	Anthony Odering		Waitaki	22	−7		
30	William Arnold		Whanganui	—	—		
31	Craig Sinclair		East Coast	—	—		
32	Russelle Knaapp		Hamilton East	—	—		
33	Lindsay Kirslake		Banks Peninsula	—	—		
34	Andrew Hogg		Maungakiekie	—	—		
35	Caleb Ansell		Coromandel	—	—		

=== Te Pāti Māori ===
Te Pāti Māori released their list on 20 August 2023.

Rank	Name	Incumbency	Contesting electorate	Previous rank	Change	Initial results	Later changes
1	**Debbie Ngarewa-Packer**	List	Te Tai Hauāuru	1	0	✓ Won Te Tai Hauāuru	
2	**Rawiri Waititi**	Electorate	Waiariki	2	0	✓ Won Waiariki	
3	**Meka Whaitiri**	Electorate	Ikaroa-Rāwhiti	(Labour: 28)	+25	✗ Lost seat	
4	Hana-Rawhiti Maipi-Clarke		Hauraki-Waikato	—	—	✓ Won Hauraki-Waikato	
5	Tākuta Ferris		Te Tai Tonga	4	−1	✓ Won Te Tai Tonga	
6	Takutai Tarsh Kemp		Tāmaki Makaurau	—	—	✓ Won Tāmaki Makaurau	✗ Died in 2025
7	Mariameno Kapa-Kingi		Te Tai Tokerau	6	−1	✓ Won Te Tai Tokerau	
8	Merepeka Raukawa-Tait		Rotorua	9	+1		
9	Eru Kapa-Kingi			10	+1		
10	Keanu Flavell			—	—		
11	Hilda Peters		Māngere	—	—		
12	Arabela Poihegatama			—	—		
13	Pere Huriwai-Seger			—	—		
14	Hoera Kereama			—	—		
15	Te Ao Kapa			—	—		
16	Bridget Bell			—	—		
17	Fallyn Flavell		East Coast	20	+3		
18	Rivah Hura			—	—		
19	Conor Watene-O'Sullivan			—	—		
20	Tureiti Moxon			11	−9		
21	Nancy Tuaine			—	—		
22	Teresa Butler			—	—		
23	Kyla Campbell-Kamariera			—	—		
24	Jacqui Harema		Kelston	—	—		
25	Te Waka Ruapounamu McLeod			—	—		
26	John Tamihere	(Former MP)	Te Atatū	7	−19		
27	Elijah Pue			12	−15		
28	Rangi McLean		Manurewa	21	−7		
29	Mikaere Sydney		Tauranga	—	—		
30	Awatea Parker		Hamilton East	—	—		
31	Te Whakapono Waikare		Wairarapa	—	—		

== Unsuccessful parties ==
=== Animal Justice Party ===
Animal Justice Party Aotearoa New Zealand announced their list.

Rank	Name	Incumbency	Contesting electorate	Previous rank	Change	Initial results	Later changes
1	Robert McNeil		Botany	—	—		
2	Anna Rippon		Port Waikato	—	—		
3	Atom Emet		Rongotai	—	—		
4	Nicholas Hancock		Pakuranga	—	—		
5	Danette Wereta		Christchurch East	—	—		
6	Hamish Watkins		New Plymouth	—	—		
7	Sarah Jackson		Christchurch Central	—	—		
8	Lily Carrington		Hamilton East	—	—		
9	Sandra Kyle		Whanganui	—	—		
10	Paran Jeet		Banks Peninsula	—	—		
11	Christopher Gordon		Wellington Central	—	—		
12	Douglas Begg		Palmerston North	—	—		
13	Chelsea Stokman		Tauranga	—	—		
14	Caitlin Grattan		Bay of Plenty	—	—		
15	Madeleine Kane		Auckland Central	—	—		
16	Melanie Wilson		Hamilton West	—	—		
17	Lynley Tulloch		Takanini	—	—		

=== Aotearoa Legalise Cannabis Party ===
Aotearoa Legalise Cannabis Party has published its list via Policy.nz.

Rank	Name	Incumbency	Contesting electorate	Previous rank	Change	Initial results	Later changes
1	Maki Herbert		Te Tai Tokerau	2	+1		
2	Michael Appleby		Wellington Central	1	−1		
3	Mike Britnell		Christchurch Central	3	0		
4	Paula Lambert		Christchurch East	4	0		
5	Kevin O'Connell		Invercargill	6	+1		
6	Irinka Britnell		Ilam	5	−1		
7	Jeff Lye		Northland	9	+2		
8	Jennifer de Jonge		Whangārei	10	+2		
9	Christopher Coker		Auckland Central	11	+2		
10	Blair Anderson		Wigram	—	—		
11	Romana Manning		Tukituki	8	−3		
12	Anntwinette Grumball		Southland	—	—		
13	Rebecca Robin		Te Tai Tonga	—	—		
14	Adrian McDermott		Dunedin	—	—		
15	Anituhia McDonald			—	—		
16	Antony Brown			12	−4		

=== DemocracyNZ ===
DemocracyNZ has published its party list via its website.

Rank	Name	Incumbency	Contesting electorate	Previous rank	Change	Initial results	Later changes
1	Matt King	(Former MP)	Northland	(National: 40)	+39		
2	Gordon Malcolm		Waimakariri	—	—		
3	Leao Tildsley		Kelston	—	—		
4	Martin Langford		Napier	—	—		
5	Scotty Bright		Port Waikato	—	—		
6	Juanita O'Connell		Ilam	—	—		
7	Roger Small		Waitaki	—	—		
8	Diana Burgess		Whangārei	—	—		
9	Doug Allington		Banks Peninsula	(Advance NZ: 11)	+2		
10	Sarah Brewer		Kaipara ki Mahurangi	—	—		
11	Sandra Campbell		Kaikōura	—	—		
12	Chris Robinson		East Coast	—	—		
13	Craig Laybourn		Whangaparāoa	—	—		

=== Freedoms NZ ===
Freedoms New Zealand is a political alliance made up of The Freedoms & Rights Coalition, Vision NZ, and the NZ Outdoors & Freedom Party.

Rank	Name	Component Party	Incumbency	Contesting electorate	Previous rank	Change	Initial results	Later changes
1	Brian Tamaki	Freedoms NZ			—	—		
2	Sue Grey	Outdoors & Freedom		West Coast-Tasman	(Outdoors: 1)	−1		
3	Hannah Tamaki	Vision NZ		Tāmaki Makaurau	(Vision NZ: 1)	−2		
4	Donna Pokere-Phillips	Outdoors & Freedom		Hauraki-Waikato	(Māori: 5)	+1		
5	Heker Robertson	Vision NZ		Remutaka	—	—		
6	Aly Cook	Outdoors & Freedom			—	—		
7	Paul Davie	Rock The Vote NZ		Auckland Central	—	—		
8	Phineas Mann	Vision NZ		New Lynn	—	—		
9	Caine Warren	Vision NZ		Manurewa	—	—		
10	John Alcock	Rock The Vote NZ		Pakuranga	—	—		
11	Sarai Tepou	Outdoors & Freedom		Coromandel	(Advance NZ: 58)	+47		
12	Charles Hunia	Vision NZ		Waiariki	—	—		
13	Mark Donaldson	Vision NZ		Northcote	—	—		
14	Eric Chuah	Rock The Vote NZ		Maungakiekie	—	—		
15	Alan Simmons	Outdoors & Freedom			(Outdoors: 2)	−13		
16	Michael Ngahuka	Vision NZ		Tukituki	—	—		
17	Vijay Sudhamalla	Vision NZ		Port Waikato	—	—		
18	Michael Clarkson	Rock The Vote NZ		Rangitata	—	—		
19	Naomi Maclean	Vision NZ		Southland	—	—		
20	Fuiavailili Ala'ilima	Vision NZ		Māngere	(New Conservative: 18)	−2		
21	Grant Mountjoy	Rock The Vote NZ			—	—		
22	Rudi du Plooy	Vision NZ		Hamilton West	—	—		
23	Karl Mokaraka	Vision NZ		Panmure-Ōtāhuhu	—	—		
24	Kathy Harvey	Vision NZ		Papakura	—	—		
25	Merania Roa	Vision NZ		Rongotai	—	—		
26	Paris Winiata	Vision NZ		Te Tai Hauāuru	(Vision NZ: 5)	−21		
27	Leon Samuels	Vision NZ		Tauranga	—	—		
28	Patrick Lim	Vision NZ		Ōhāriu	—	—		
29	Lois Dornan	Vision NZ		Waikato	—	—		
30	Meg Lim	Vision NZ		Wellington Central	—	—		
31	Leighton Packer	Vision NZ		East Coast	(ONE: 11)	−20		
32	Max Rangitutia	Vision NZ		Hutt South	—	—		
33	Daryl Raison	Vision NZ		Taranaki-King Country	—	—		
34	Judith Terrill	Vision NZ		Invercargill	(ONE: 15)	−19		
35	Ata Tuhakaraina	Vision NZ		Ikaroa-Rāwhiti	—	—		

=== Leighton Baker Party ===
Leighton Baker Party's list was published by the Electoral Commission.

Rank	Name	Incumbency	Contesting electorate	Previous rank	Change	Initial results	Later changes
1	Leighton Baker		Waimakariri	(New Conservative: 1)	0		
2	Wendy Gillespie		Bay of Plenty	—	—		
3	Debra Marie Cullimore		Wigram	—	—		

=== New Conservatives ===
The New Conservatives announced their list.

Rank	Name	Incumbency	Contesting electorate	Previous rank	Change	Initial results	Later changes
1	Helen Houghton		Christchurch East	6	+5		
2	Dieuwe de Boer		Botany	9	+7		
3	Karl Thomas		Rangitata	—	—		
4	Paul Deacon			—	—		
5	Chris O'Brien		Ilam	—	—		
6	Alister Hood		Kelston	—	—		
7	Cyndee Elder		Dunedin	—	—		
8	Jonathan Langridge		Tauranga	—	—		
9	Abe Coulter		Selwyn	—	—		
10	Steven Senn			—	—		

=== New Nation Party ===
New Nation Party list was published by the Electoral Commission.

Rank	Name	Incumbency	Contesting electorate	Previous rank	Change	Initial results	Later changes
1	Michael Jacomb			—	—		
2	Guy Slocum		Auckland Central	—	—		
3	Greg Robinson		New Plymouth	—	—		
4	Dolf van Amersfoort		Rangitata	—	—		
5	Jeremy Elvidge			—	—		
6	Nathan Barnes			—	—		
7	Jan Newbould			—	—		
8	Anthony de Vries			—	—		
9	Angela Mackie			—	—		
10	Brian Johnston			—	—		

=== NewZeal ===
NewZeal's list was published by the Electoral Commission.

Rank	Name	Incumbency	Contesting electorate	Previous rank	Change	Initial results	Later changes
1	Alfred Ngaro	(Former MP)		(National: 30)	+29		
2	Paul Adams	(Former MP)	East Coast Bays	—	—		
3	Kariana Black-Vercoe		Rotorua	(ONE: 5)	+2		
4	Lisa Marie Mead		Banks Peninsula	—	—		
5	Tony Pitiroi		Remutaka	—	—		
6	Charles Nimmo			—	—		
7	Waipatu Winitana			—	—		
8	Tracey Pita			—	—		
9	Hayley Colling			—	—		
10	Watson Pita			—	—		
11	Marlene Angilene Greaves			—	—		

=== New Zealand Loyal ===
New Zealand Loyal's list was published by the Electoral Commission.

Rank	Name	Incumbency	Contesting electorate	Previous rank	Change	Initial results	Later changes
1	Liz Gunn			—	—		
2	Peter Drew			—	—		
3	Phillip George Engel			—	—		

=== The Opportunities Party ===
The Opportunities Party (TOP) announced their list on 4 August 2023.

Rank	Name	Incumbency	Contesting electorate	Previous rank	Change	Initial results	Later changes
1	Raf Manji		Ilam	—	—		
2	Natalia Albert		Wellington Central	—	—		
3	Benjamin Peters		Dunedin	5	+2		
4	Nina Su		Epsom	—	—		
5	Shai Navot		Upper Harbour	2	−3		
6	Jessica Hammond		Ōhāriu	3	−3		
7	Ciara Swords		Mount Albert	18	+11		
8	Damian Sycamore		Auckland Central	—	—		
9	Naomi Pocock		Hamilton West	8	−1		
10	Abe Gray		North Shore	11	+1		
11	Ben Wylie-van Eerd		Hutt South	14	+3		
12	Alex Corkin		Hamilton East	—	—		
13	Megan Owen		Waikato	—	—		

=== Women's Rights Party ===
Women's Rights Party announced their list on 14 September 2023 via its website.

Rank	Name	Incumbency	Contesting electorate	Previous rank	Change	Initial results	Later changes
1	Jill Ovens			—	—		
2	Chimene del la Varis			—	—		
3	Karen Guilliland			—	—		
4	Marnie Fornusek			—	—		
5	Prue Hyman			—	—		
6	Catherine Ormsby			—	—		
7	Linde Rose			—	—		
8	Sue Hoskins			—	—		
9	Catherine Mann			—	—		
10	MacKenzie Clark			—	—		
11	Kathleen Lauderdale			(Social Credit: 5)	−6		
12	Adrienne Owen-Jones			—	—		

== See also ==
- Candidates in the 2023 New Zealand general election by electorate
