= James Christmas =

New Zealand lawyer and politician (born 1985)

James Christmas MP
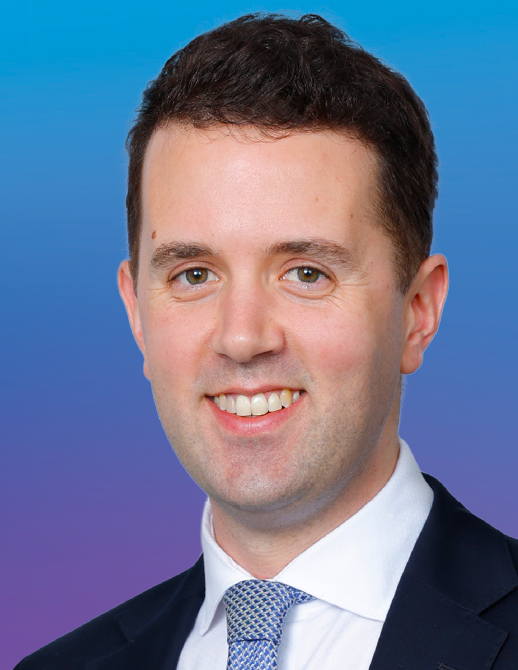
- Christmas in 2023

Member of the New Zealand Parliament for ACT party list
- Incumbent
- Assumed office 7 November 2026

Personal details
- Born: 1985 (age 40–41) New Zealand
- Party: ACT (since 2026)
- Other political affiliations: National (before 2026)
- Spouse: James Carpinter
- Education: University of Canterbury; Victoria University of Wellington
- Profession: Lawyer; barrister

James Nicholas Christmas (born 1985) is a New Zealand lawyer and politician, serving as an ACT New Zealand list MP since the 2026 general election. Christmas previously stood for the National Party at the 2023 general election and worked as an advisor to senior National ministers.

== Early life and career ==
James Nicholas Christmas was born in 1985. He attended Burnside High School, the University of Canterbury, and Victoria University of Wellington. Christmas graduated with a Bachelor of Laws and Master of Arts. He was admitted to the bar in 2012.

Christmas introduced himself to newly elected National MP Chris Finlayson at a classical concert in 2005. Six years later, after graduating from university, he went on to work in Finlayson's ministerial office, advising on his Treaty negotiations and security and intelligence portfolios. He then joined then-Prime Minister John Key's office in 2016 shortly before his resignation, and continued working for Key's successor, Bill English.

In 2019, Christmas became a barrister sole and joined Britomart Chambers four years later.

Christmas released a book about Treaty settlements co-authored with Finlayson in 2021, called He Kupu Taurangi : Treaty settlements and the future of Aotearoa New Zealand.

== Political career ==
New Zealand Parliament
Years	Term	Electorate	List	Party
2026–present	55th	List	7	ACT

Christmas was selected by the National Party to be a list-only candidate in the 2023 election. He was 28th on National's party list and was understood to be a favourite to become Attorney-General. He "narrowly" missed getting into parliament.

In April 2026, Christmas was selected by ACT New Zealand as their candidate for the Tāmaki electorate in the 2026 election, replacing deputy leader Brooke van Velden. He was placed 7th on ACT's party list.

Following the election on 7 November 2026 preliminary results showed that Christmas had come third in the Tāmaki electorate, behind National's Mahesh Muralidhar and Labour's Max Harris, but had comfortably won a list seat, as ACT was entitled to 13 seats.

== Personal life ==
Christmas is married to James Carpinter. He affiliates to Ngāi Tahu. Christmas plays the French horn, tuba, and piano.
