= Suveen Sanis Walgampola =

New Zealand advocate

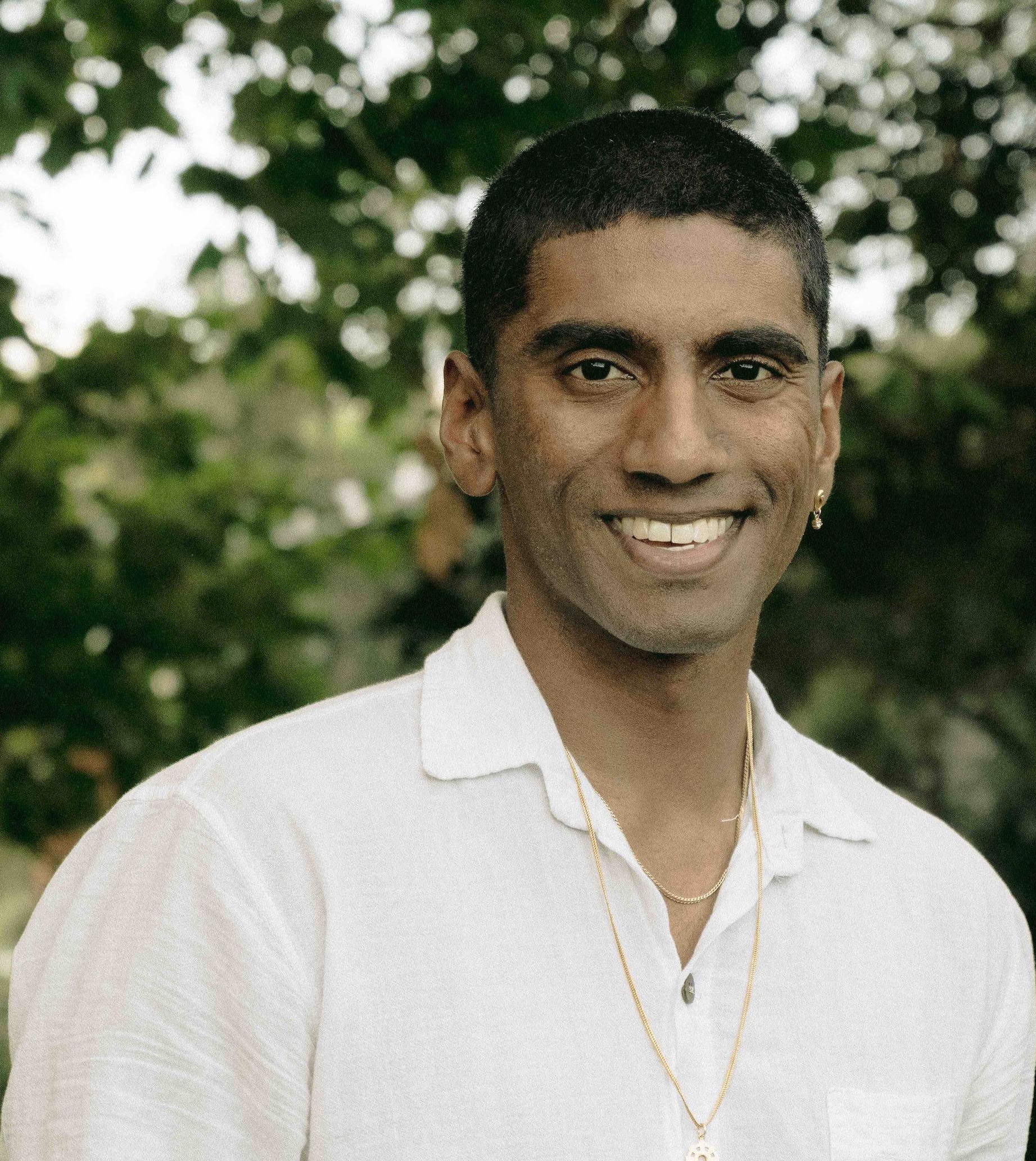

Personal details
- Born: Colombo, Sri Lanka
- Party: Green
- Website: https://www.greens.org.nz/suveen_sanis_walgampola_2023

Suveen Sanis Walgampola is a community advocate and co-founder of Duality, an organisation for Sri Lankan youths in New Zealand. He is also a member of the Green Party of Aotearoa New Zealand and was the candidate for the Mount Roskill electorate in the 2023 general election.

== Biography ==
Walgampola was born in Colombo, Sri Lanka, and is Sinhalese. He moved to New Zealand at the age of two. Growing up in Auckland, he attended Auckland Grammar School from 2004 to 2009, then Massey University from 2010 to 2014 where he studied a Bachelor of Commerce (B.Com.), Banking, Corporate, Finance, and Securities Law. In 2016 Walgampola completed a Graduate Diploma in Commerce, Operations, and Supply Chain Management from the University of Auckland.

Walgampola is the co-founder of Duality, an organisation for Sri Lankan youths in New Zealand. In supporting the Sri Lankan diasporic community in Aotearoa New Zealand, Walgampola aims to foster support for identity formation and success among the community. Duality organises community engagement projects, mentorship programmes and knowledge and story sharing opportunities.

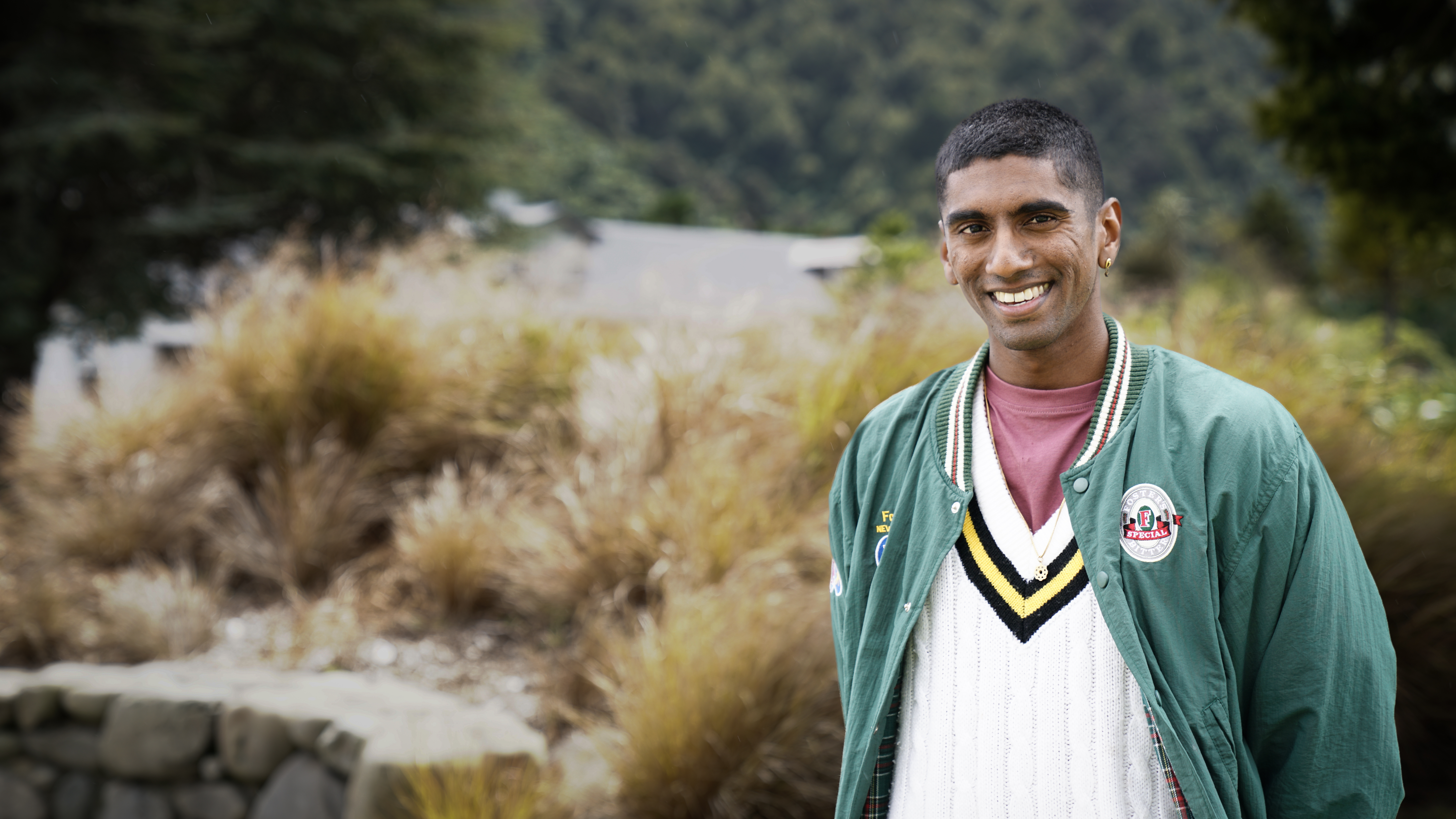
Walgampola in 2023

In 2020 Walgampola volunteered for the Green Party election campaign. In 2023 Walgampola ran as the candidate for the Mount Roskill electorate and received 12.12% of votes behind the Labour Party's Michael Wood (30.4%) and National Party member Carlos Cheung (43.40%). Walgampola advocates for a community-led attitude towards politics and focuses on issues supporting tino rangatiratanga and migrant and minority voices.

Before being involved in New Zealand politics, Walgampola was a mental health support worker.

Walgampola practices the art form of Geta Beraya, the traditional Sri Lankan drums.
