= Laura McClure =

New Zealand politician (born 1985)

Laura McClure MP
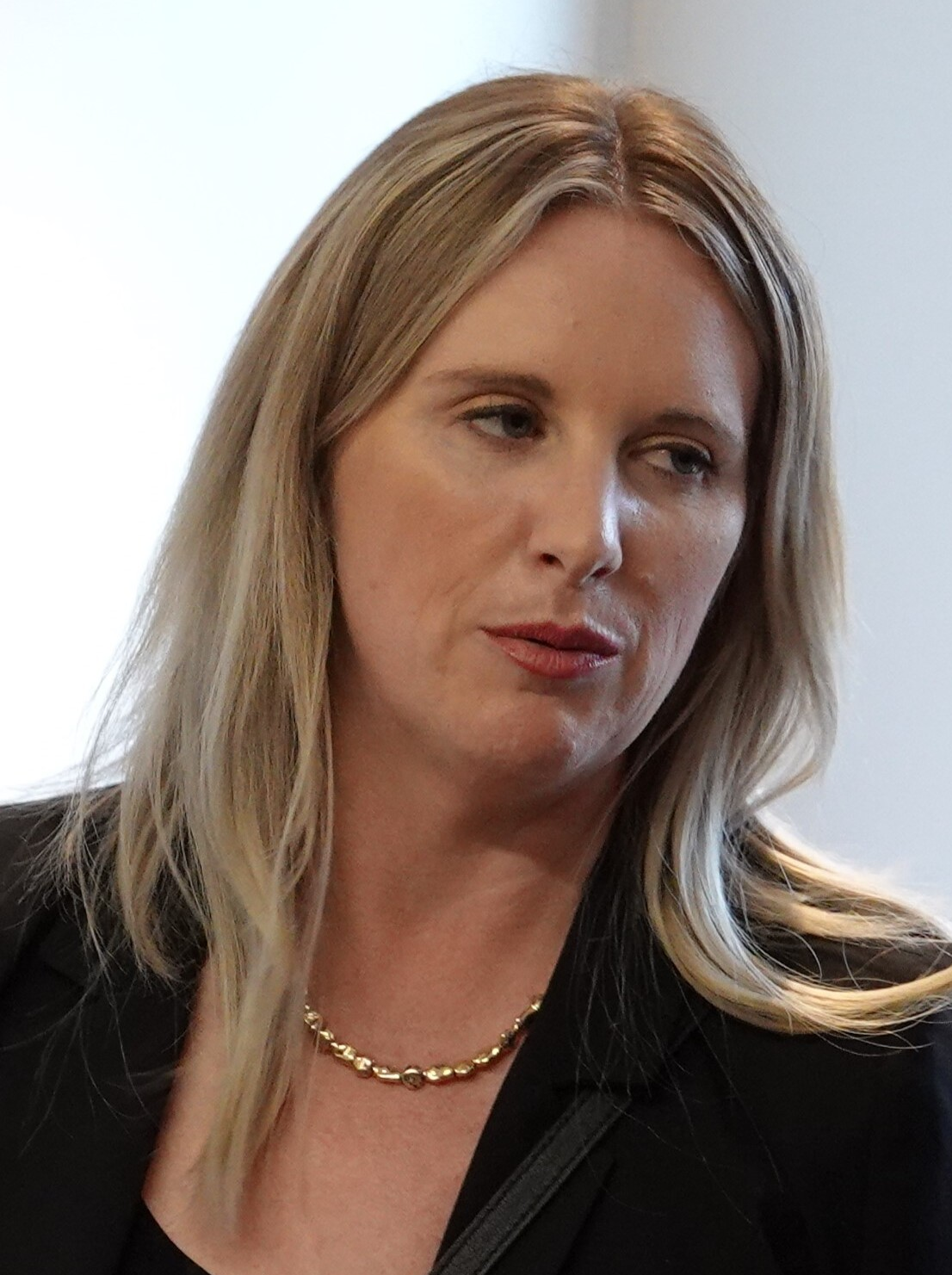
- McClure in 2025

Member of the New Zealand Parliament for ACT party list
- Incumbent
- Assumed office 14 October 2023

Personal details
- Born: Laura Barbara McClure; 3 August 1985 (age 41) Christchurch, New Zealand
- Party: ACT New Zealand
- Children: 2

Laura Barbara McClure (born 3 August 1985), previously known as Laura Trask, is a New Zealand politician. She was elected to the New Zealand House of Representatives in the 2023 New Zealand general election, representing ACT New Zealand.

== Early life and family ==
McClure was born in Christchurch on 3 August 1985, and raised there as the eldest of three children. Her father Bill McClure, who moved from England to New Zealand in the 1970s, was a former general manager at Kraft Heinz who later founded a fire evacuation business. Her mother Sharyn (née Neame), one of eight children, was a hairdresser who grew up in public housing. McClure's parents disagreed with one another politically, with her mother being a staunch Labour Party supporter and her father a National supporter; she grew up in an environment of significant political discourse.

She attended Burnside High School and began an arts degree at the University of Canterbury but did not complete the course, instead training as a pharmacy technician. She married Riki Trask, a construction project manager. They have two children.

== Career ==
McClure worked as a pharmacy technician in Christchurch and Wellington. After having their first child, McClure and her husband took over the Auckland branch of her father's fire safety business. She is a registered fire safety evacuation consultant. While living in Auckland, McClure advocated for 24-hour medical support for south Auckland, as she found herself driving more than 40 kilometres (25 mi) for after-hours medical care for her children.

In 2020, she started volunteering for the ACT Party in Christchurch and worked for Toni Severin, a Member of Parliament elected on the ACT list. In a 2023 interview, McClure described her entry into politics as spontaneous, saying she would "have absolutely laughed" if someone told her ten years prior that she would become a politician.

== Member of Parliament ==
New Zealand Parliament
Years	Term	Electorate	List	Party
2023–2026	54th	List	10	ACT
2026–present	55th	List	9	ACT

=== 2023 general election ===
Under her married name Laura Trask, McClure contested Banks Peninsula in the 2023 election. She was tenth on ACT's party list, placed higher than Severin at 14. Speaking to The Press about her list position, McClure said did not expect to be given a winnable position and “it was not an ideal situation that I wanted to be in, but at the same time, I’m very honoured.” On election night, McClure came fourth, with 2,073 votes based on final results, but entered parliament due to her position on the party list.

McClure's primary political concerns are oriented around regulation and the perception of "specific extra rights" for members of particular demographic groups. McClure criticises New Zealand's education system as "incredibly woke", which she defines as policies that detract from educating children in favour of ideological pursuits. She supports cutting government spending, which she considers the primary factor in inflation.

=== First term, 2023–present ===
After being elected to Parliament on the ACT party list, McClure was appointed ACT spokesperson on education, mental health, small business, and seniors. She sits on the social services and community committee and the foreign affairs, defence and trade committee.

During her first term, McClure authored a member's bill called the "Deepfake Digital Harm and Exploitation Bill," which seeks to amend the definition of intimate visual recordings to include "deepfake" images. The bill was drawn from Parliament's "biscuit tin" on 23 October 2025. The proposed bill also seeks to expand the remit of the Harmful Digital Communications Act 2015 to include deepfakes.

McClure has also sponsored the Broadcasting (Disestablishment of Broadcasting Standards Authority) Amendment Bill, which proposes abolishing the broadcasting regulating, the Broadcasting Standards Authority (BSA). She argued that regulator operated based on the definition of a broadcaster established in 1991. After the BSA ruled on 31 March 2026 that it had jurisdiction over the online radio station The Platform, McClure criticised the regulator, calling it "a bureaucratic empire that has taken a law written for rabbit-ear TV, and stretched it over the internet."

In May 2026, McClure was part of a cross-party delegation of four New Zealand MPs including Maureen Pugh, David Wilson and Duncan Webb who visited Taiwan, meeting with Taiwanese legislators and foreign ministry officials. In response, the Chinese government in early June 2026 banned the four from visiting China, Hong Kong and Macau for a year on the grounds that their actions violated the One China policy. The Chinese Embassy in New Zealand stated that their travel ban could be waived or rescinded if they apologised for their actions. In response, McClure said that the "demand for an apology was frankly insulting," and refused to apologise for visiting Taiwan.

=== 2026 general election ===
During the 2026 New Zealand general election, McClure was ranked ninth place on the ACT party list and contested the Wigram electorate. On 7 November, McClure came fifth place in the Wigram race, with 1,115 votes. She was re-elected into Parliament via the ACT part list.
