= Tanya Unkovich =

New Zealand politician

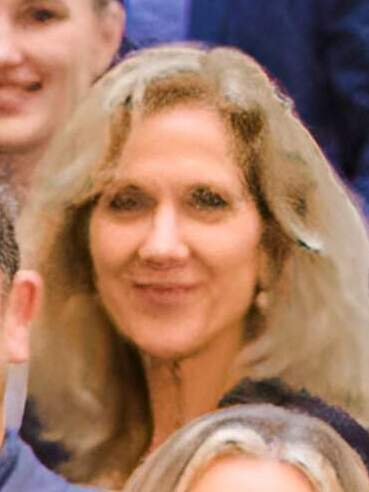

Member of the New Zealand Parliament for New Zealand First party list
- In office 14 October 2023 – 27 June 2025
- Succeeded by: David Wilson (Note: Normally, list MPs do not have individual predecessors or successors, but Unkovich resigned during a sitting parliament and therefore was succeeded by Wilson.)

Personal details
- Born: Tanya Marie Unkovich Dargaville, New Zealand
- Party: New Zealand First
- Spouses: Phil Morrow (died 2005); Grant Anderson (m. 2011)
- Education: University of Auckland
- Occupation: Life and business coach

Tanya Marie Unkovich is a former New Zealand politician, who represented New Zealand First as a member of parliament from the 2023 general election to 2025. She is the author of four books, and has previously worked in finance, as a life coach, and public speaker.

== Early life, family and career ==
Unkovich was born in Dargaville, and is of Croatian descent. Her father, Smiljan Unković from Račišće on the island of Korčula, and her mother Pavica Samić from Opuzen, migrated to New Zealand in 1958 with their first child, settling in Northland where they had three further children. After their home burnt down when Unkovich was eight years old, the family moved to Auckland. Unkovich studied at the University of Auckland, graduating with a Bachelor of Commerce degree in accounting and commercial law in 1984.

After leaving university, Unkovich found employment at a large accountancy firm as an auditor. In 1986, she took a break from commerce and became a flight attendant with Air New Zealand. After three years flying domestic routes and internationally, she took a position as an internal and inflight services auditor with the airline. When she was 28 years old, Unkovich left Air New Zealand and established her own accounting practice. And not long after, she became a consultant for MYOB accounting software after its introduction to New Zealand.

In the 1990s, Unkovich obtained her Diploma in Counselling while continuing to provide consultancy services. In 2005, her husband, Phil Morrow, died of cancer, five months after being diagnosed. After being widowed, Unkovich expanded her work, becoming a life and business coach, author and public speaker. She has been married to her second husband, Grant Anderson, since 2011.

Unkovich is the author of four books. Her fourth title From Grief to Greatness: The Art of Overcoming Adversity (2022) was published by Christian publishing company Deep River Books, a member of the Evangelical Christian Publishers Association (ECPA).

== Political career ==
New Zealand Parliament
Years	Term	Electorate	List	Party
2023–2025	54th	List	8	NZ First

Unkovich entered politics when she was selected by New Zealand First to contest the Epsom electorate at the 2023 election, and was ranked 8th on the party list. During the campaign, she faced criticism for participating in a Nuremberg trials Telegram group that likened COVID-19 vaccines to Nazi war crimes.

During the 2023 election, Unkovich came sixth place in the Epsom electorate, gaining 573 votes. However, she was elected to Parliament on the NZ First party list. NZ First won 6.08% percent of the vote, entitling it to eight seats.

In December 2023, Unkovich began hosting an NZ First podcast called FirstHand.

In May 2024, Unkovich introduced a Member's Bill called the "Fair Access to Bathrooms Bill", which would require new public buildings to provide "separate, clearly demarcated, unisex and single sex bathrooms." It would also make it an offense for any person found using a toilet "who is not of the sex for which that toilet has been designated." on 15 May, Netsafe confirmed it was investigating a fake Facebook account impersonating Unkovich's official page, which sent abusive messages to a respondent disagreeing with her party's Bathroom Bill. In mid-May 2024, Unkovich spoke at the "Unsilenced: Middle New Zealand on Ideology" conference organised by Inflection Point, which has expressed opposition to LGBT and transgender rights in New Zealand. During the conference, Unkovich likened the gender dysphoria facing transgender children to weight issues and body dysmorphia. She also said that God inspired her to get involved with politics.

On 23 July 2024, NZ First lodged a complaint against Labour MP Ingrid Leary with Speaker Gerry Brownlee after she described Unkovich as an "anti-trans activist” during a health select committee on 19 June 2024. Leary had questioned Unkovich's involvement with the mental health programme "Gumboot Friday" due to her alleged anti-transgender views. Unkovich and NZ First regarded Leary's remarks as a potential breach of parliamentary privilege. On 1 August 2024, Leary apologised to Unkovich during Question Time in Parliament.

Unkovich resigned her post as a member of Parliament on 27 June 2025 to concentrate on work in the private sector. She was succeeded by David Wilson.

== Books ==
Unkovich has written the following books:

- Unplanned Journey: A Triumph in Life and Death (2008), eBook, VMI Publishers, Sisters, Oregon
- A Wolf in Sheep's Clothing (2014), eBook, Austin Macauley Publishers Ltd
- Unplanned Journey: A Triumph in Life and Death (2020), eAudiobook, Findaway World
- From Grief to Greatness: The Art of Overcoming Adversity (2022), Deep River Books, Sisters, Oregon
