= David Wilson (New Zealand First politician) =

New Zealand politician

David Wilson MP

Member of the New Zealand Parliament for New Zealand First party list
- Incumbent
- Assumed office 30 June 2025
- Preceded by: Tanya Unkovich (Note: Normally, list MPs do not have individual predecessors or successors, but Unkovich resigned during a sitting parliament and therefore was succeeded by Wilson.)

Personal details
- Born: David Ashley Wilson Kumeū, New Zealand
- Party: New Zealand First
- Spouse: Anna Tabuteau
- Children: Two

Academic background
- Education: Auckland University of Technology
- Thesis: The Metropolitan Auckland Project: A Step-Change in Governance and Regional Economic Development in a City-Region (2016)
- Doctoral advisor: Marilyn Waring; Paul Dalziel

David Ashley Wilson is a New Zealand politician. A member of the New Zealand First party, he was elected a Member of the New Zealand House of Representatives (MP) on 30 June 2025.

== Early life and career ==
Wilson was born in Kumeū, Auckland and was raised in Glendowie by adoptive parents. He was schooled at Mount Taylor Primary School, Glen Innes Intermediate School, and Saint Kentigern College, where he was a boarder. His adopted father, a businessman, died in Wilson's final year of high school and he said that inhibited his ability to go to university. After working as a retailer while his wife trained to be a doctor, he studied for a Bachelor of Arts in social policy and psychology and a masters degree in public policy.

In 2016, Wilson was awarded a PhD from Auckland University of Technology for his thesis The Metropolitan Auckland Project: A Step-Change in Governance and Regional Economic Development in a City-Region, which was supervised by Marilyn Waring.

Wilson's career has been in economic development. He was the chief executive officer of the Northland Regional Council's economic development agency Northland Inc from 2013 to 2017, when he resigned to become a parliamentary candidate. Simultaneously, he was the chairman of the Economic Development Association of New Zealand. After not being elected in the 2017 general election, he went back to Northland Inc until 2019. He then moved to the Upper Harbour area of Auckland, where he worked as a consultant.

== Political career ==
New Zealand Parliament
Years	Term	Electorate	List	Party
2025–2026	54th	List	9th	NZ First
2026–present	55th	List	12th	NZ First

Wilson joined the New Zealand First party in 2015. He was an unsuccessful candidate for the party in both the 2017 and 2020 general elections: in 2017, he was number 14 on the list and stood in Te Atatū; and in 2020, he stood in Whangārei and was ranked 9th on the party list. When the Labour–New Zealand First coalition government created the Provincial Growth Fund (PGF) during its 2017–2020 term, regional economic development minister Shane Jones appointed Wilson to the PGF independent advisory panel. Wilson contested Upper Harbour for New Zealand First in the 2023 general election and was 9th on the party list.

=== Member of Parliament, 2025–present ===
While he was not elected at the 2023 election, he was declared elected on 30 June 2025 to fill the vacancy left by Tanya Unkovich's resignation. In his first term in Parliament, he was sat on the economic development, science and innovation committee and the finance and expenditure committee.

In May 2026, Wilson was part of a cross-party delegation of four New Zealand MPs including Maureen Pugh, Laura McClure and Duncan Webb who visited Taiwan, meeting with Taiwanese legislators and foreign ministry officials. In response, the Chinese government in early June 2026 banned the four from visiting China, Hong Kong and Macau for a year on the grounds that their actions violated the One China policy. The Chinese Embassy in New Zealand stated that their travel ban could be waived if they apologised for their actions. Prime Minister Christopher Luxon denounced the ban on the four MPs as "entirely inappropriate" and said that the New Zealand government would raise the matter with their Chinese counterparts.

In the 2026 New Zealand general election, Wilson was selected to be his party's candidate for the new electorate of Henderson. He was ranked 12th place on the party list. Based on preliminary results, Wilson came fourth place in Henderson with 1,741 votes. He was re-elected to Parliament on the New Zealand First party list.

== Personal life ==
Wilson coached netball and basketball. He is also an accessibility and innovation advocate, being a board member of social enterprise The Be. In 2024 he was defrauded, losing $200,000 from his retirement savings in an investment scam. Wilson spoke publicly about the incident to bring awareness of scams as well as the lack of protections for victims.
