= Emma Chatterton =

New Zealand politician

Emma Chatterton MP
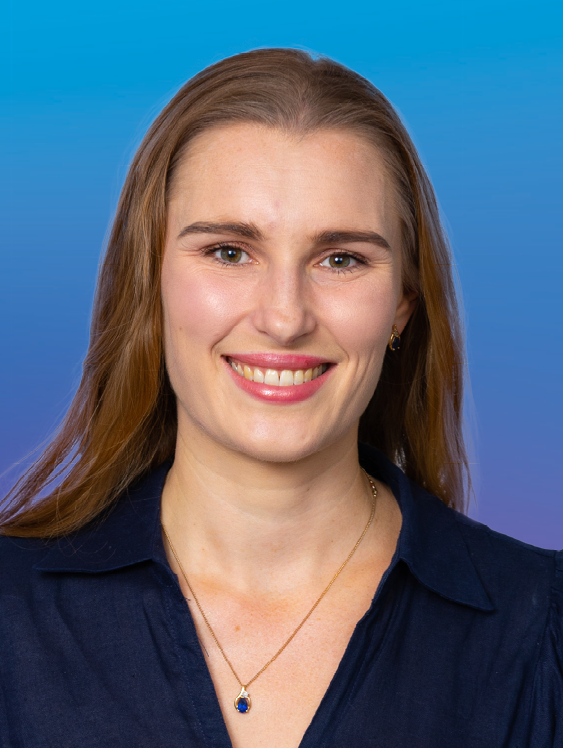
- Chatterton in 2023

Member of the New Zealand Parliament for Papakura
- Incumbent
- Assumed office 7 November 2026
- Preceded by: Judith Collins

Personal details
- Born: 1989 or 1990 (age 36–37) New Zealand
- Party: National
- Education: University of Cambridge

Emma Chatterton (née Hutton) is a New Zealand politician. She was selected as a candidate for the Papakura for the National Party, in the 2026 New Zealand general election.

== Early life and career ==
Chatterton is the eldest of four children born to Dorothy and Ross Hutton. Her father was a police officer. As a child, she appeared with her family on the 2002 reality television programme Colonial House produced by Julie Christie. The programme saw the Hutton family live as English immigrants to Canterbury from 1852.

Chatterton attended Columba College in Dunedin. She was awarded the Otago Daily Times Class Act award in 2007. She later studied music at Cambridge University. Her qualifications include a bachelor of arts, master of arts, postgraduate certificate in education and bachelor of arts with honours in English literature.

Chatterton was a teacher. She later worked as a senior leader at Wellington-based social investment company ImpactLab, founded by former National Party leader Sir Bill English. After unsuccessfully contesting the Remutaka electorate at the 2023 general election, she worked for education minister Erica Stanford as a senior advisor.

== Political career ==
=== 2023 election campaign ===
Chatterton was selected by the National Party to contest the Remutaka electorate at the 2023 election. She was 27th on the party list. On election night, Chatterton lost to Chris Hipkins by more than 7600 votes, although as there was a possibility of her entering parliament through her list position, she still attended the induction for new MPs.

During the School Strike for Climate while a candidate in 2023, Chatterton spoke to the crowd outside parliament. She was heckled, and as other parties had sent sitting MPs to speak, it led James Shaw to say she had been "strung out to dry" by the National Party. During her campaign, Chatterton walked into a dairy to hand out pamphlets to find an attempted robbery was in progress.

=== First term, 2026–present ===
New Zealand Parliament
Years	Term	Electorate	List	Party
2026–present	55th	Papakura	52	National

Ahead of the 2026 general election, Chatterton was nominated as the National candidate in Papakura, which had been held by senior minister Judith Collins until her retirement. Chatterton was Wellington-based at the time of her selection and won ahead of Auckland-based list MP Nancy Lu. It was suggested that implicit support for Chatterton by East Coast Bays MP Erica Stanford was beneficial for her candidacy. Based on preliminary results, she retained Papakura for National by a margin of 8,394 votes.

== Personal life ==
Chatterton has four children with her husband Tom.
