= Benjamin Doyle =

New Zealand politician

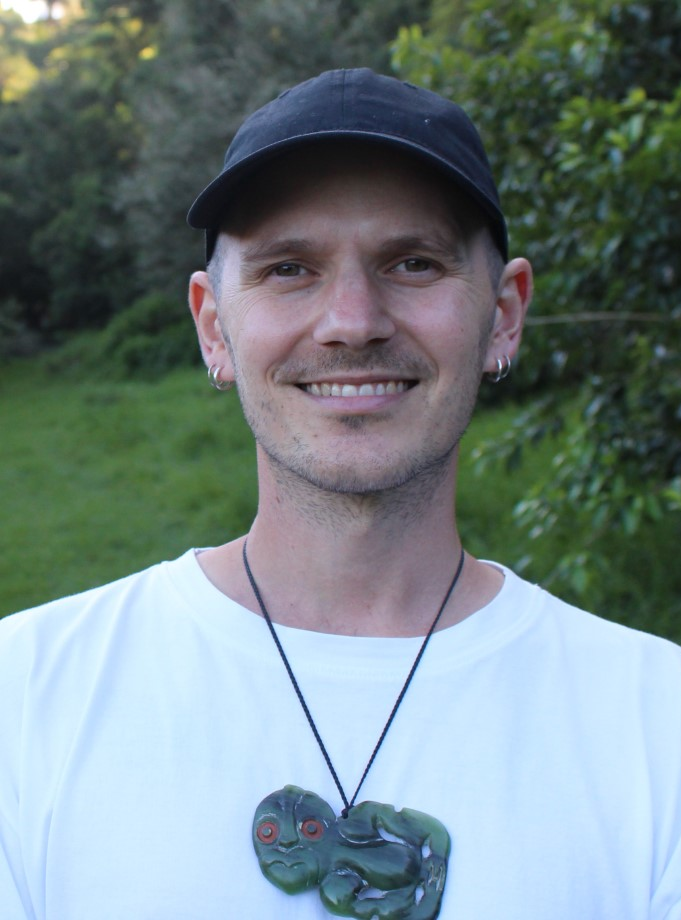
- Doyle in 2023

Member of the New Zealand Parliament for Green party list
- In office 22 October 2024 – 3 October 2025
- Preceded by: Darleen Tana (Note: Normally, list MPs do not have individual predecessors or successors, but Tana was removed during a sitting parliament and therefore was succeeded by Doyle.)
- Succeeded by: Mike Davidson (Note: Normally, list MPs do not have individual predecessors or successors, but Doyle resigned during a sitting parliament and therefore was succeeded by Davidson.)

Personal details
- Born: Benjamin Cody Doyle; 1991 or 1992 (age 33–34)
- Party: Green
- Children: 1

Benjamin Cody Doyle (born 1991 or 1992) is a former New Zealand politician, having served as the country's first non-binary member of parliament from October 2024 until October 2025, representing the Green Party as a list MP.

== Early and personal life ==
Doyle was born in 1991 or 1992, and grew up in Whangaparāoa. Doyle is of Ngāpuhi, Scottish, and Irish descent. Doyle lived in Auckland through high school and university.

Doyle was a teacher at Auckland Girls' Grammar School and Manurewa High School. Later, they held positions of head of Māori at Melville High School and head of social sciences at Rototuna Senior High School. They then worked as a kaupapa Māori researcher and facilitator at the University of Waikato, and as a community organiser for artists and LGBTQIA+ communities. Until becoming an MP, they worked at Burnett Foundation Aotearoa.

Doyle is non-binary, takatāpui and disabled. As of 2024, they live in Hamilton with their partner and child.

== Political career ==
New Zealand Parliament
Years	Term	Electorate	List	Party
2024–2025	54th	List	18	Green

=== 2023 general election ===
Doyle spoke against allowing the anti-trans activist Kellie-Jay Keen-Minshull (known as Posie Parker) into New Zealand, saying "Posie Parker should not be allowed into Aotearoa. In letting her enter, the minister has chosen to allow hateful anti-trans rhetoric into Aotearoa. That is unacceptable."

Doyle contested the Hamilton West electorate in the 2023 election. They were 18th on the Green Party list. Doyle came third in the Hamilton West electorate with 3,230 votes. The Green Party won 12 list seats in the election, and therefore Doyle was not elected at 18th on the party list.

=== First term, 2024–2025 ===
Doyle was declared elected on 22 October 2024 following the removal of Darleen Tana as a list MP earlier that month. They said about Tana's removal:

I made a really intentional decision about not getting involved in that because I was aware of the fact that I was implicated in it. But if I was seen to be involved in that process, it would be perceived as biased and it would be perceived as having motivations.

Doyle was the first non-binary member of parliament. In their first term, they were a member of the Māori Affairs committee and the Green Party spokesperson for ACC, internal affairs, and takatāpui and rainbow communities, associate spokesperson for education with a focus on Māori and early childhood education and associate spokesperson for health with a focus on sexual and reproductive health.

In early 2025, businessman and former New Zealand First member Rhys Williams launched a social media campaign targeting Doyle over a photo album Doyle had posted to their personal Instagram account, @biblebeltbussy, in 2023. The album, captioned "bussy galore", garnered controversy over the inclusion of a photo of Doyle posing with their child. On 9 April, Doyle addressed a press conference where they explained that their social media posts did not have a sexual meaning, and that they had received "a significant number of threats to my life and the safety of my child and family."

On 5 September 2025, Doyle announced they would be resigning from Parliament on 3 October 2025, citing safety concerns. During their farewell speech at Parliament, Doyle described Parliament as a "hostile and toxic place that wasn't built for people like[ them]." Their resignation took effect at 11:59 p.m. on 3 October.

In mid-September 2025, Doyle later told Te Ao Māori News that they had experienced a "relentless campaign of threats, break-ins, threats against their child, assaults and police interventions" as a result of Williams' social media campaign. By 21 September, Police had charged over 10 individuals for threats or actions against them. Police had also issued formal warnings to four individuals for breaching the Harmful Digital Communications Act 2015 and were investigating five other cases at the time of writing. On 10 October, Police charged a 19-year old man with making death threats against Doyle via a social media platform.

In June 2026, the Broadcasting Standards Authority (BSA) ordered radio station Newstalk ZB to censure host Heather du Plessis-Allan and correspondent Barry Soper for making dehumanising comments about Doyle on-air on 5 September 2025.
