= Mahesh Muralidhar =

New Zealand politician

Mahesh Muralidhar MP
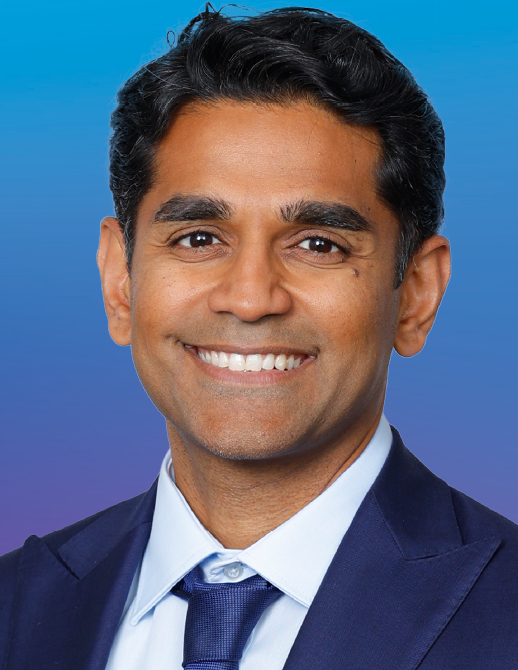

Member of the New Zealand Parliament for Tāmaki
- Incumbent
- Assumed office 7 November 2026
- Preceded by: Brooke van Velden

Personal details
- Born: 1979 or 1980 Kerala, India
- Party: National
- Spouse: Praveena Karu

Mahesh Muralidhar (born 1979 or 1980) is a New Zealand politician, representing the New Zealand National Party as a Member of Parliament since the 2026 New Zealand general election.

== Early life and career ==
Muralidhar was born in Kerala, India and spent his early childhood in Singapore from the ages of two to fourteen. He then moved to New Zealand in 1994, where he attended Napier Boys' High School.

He holds a Bachelor of Science in Statistics and a postgraduate qualification in Public Policy from the University of Auckland, as well as a Master of Business Administration (MBA) from the Australian Graduate School of Management at the University of New South Wales.

In 2003, Muralidhar won the New Zealand reality television programme Going Straight, a competition featuring physical challenges. During filming, he sustained third-degree burns to approximately 12% of his body when a stunt went wrong, requiring extensive medical treatment.

Muralidhar is the founder and Chief Executive Officer of Phase One Ventures, a New Zealand-based early-stage venture capital firm that was a firm believer in startups like VXT, KiwiFibre Innovation and NextWork. He was a member of the early leadership team at Canva, serving as the company's first Head of People Operations. He has also held senior executive positions at several Australian technology companies, including Airtasker and Simply Wall St.

== Political career ==
New Zealand Parliament
Years	Term	Electorate	List	Party
2026–present	55th	Tāmaki	23	National

Muralidhar was selected by the National Party to contest the Auckland Central electorate at the 2023 election. He was ranked 43rd on the party list, and was unsuccessful in his bid to unseat incumbent Green Party MP Chlöe Swarbrick.

In February 2026, Muralidhar was selected by the National Party to contest the Tāmaki electorate at the 2026 election. He was ranked 23rd on the party list. At the 2026 election held on 7 November, Muralidhar won Tāmaki, returning the electorate to National after it was won by ACT's Brooke van Velden in 2023. His election made him the first National Party MP of Indian descent to win an electorate seat. He is the third MP of Indian descent to represent the National Party in Parliament after Kanwaljit Singh Bakshi and Parmjeet Parmar. Based on preliminary results, Muralidhar gained Tāmaki by a margin of 5,356 votes.
