= Mike Davidson (politician) =

New Zealand politician (born 1976)

Mike Davidson MP
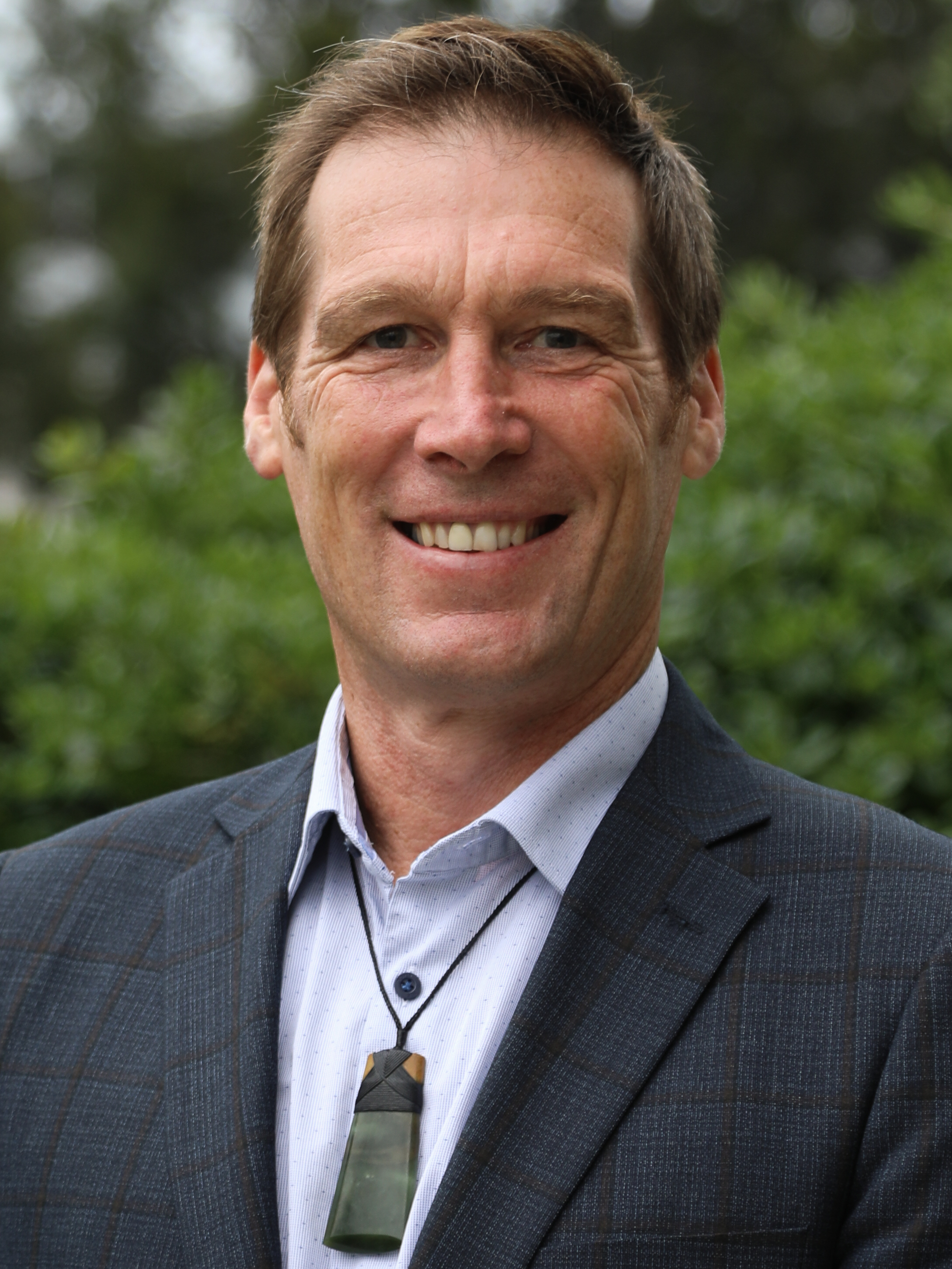
- Davidson in 2026

Member of the New Zealand Parliament for Green party list
- In office 6 October 2025 – 7 November 2026
- Preceded by: Benjamin Doyle (Note: Normally, list MPs do not have individual predecessors or successors, but Doyle resigned during a sitting parliament and therefore was succeeded by Davidson.)

Member of the Christchurch City Council for the Papanui ward
- In office 2016–2022
- Succeeded by: Victoria Henstock

Personal details
- Born: Michael John Davidson; 29 January 1976 (age 50) Kaikōura, New Zealand
- Party: Green Party of Aotearoa New Zealand
- Relatives: Lianne Dalziel (stepmother)

Michael John Davidson (born 29 January 1976) is a New Zealand politician. He has represented the Green Party of Aotearoa New Zealand as a Member of Parliament since 6 October 2025, when he replaced Benjamin Doyle.

== Early life ==
Davidson was born in Kaikōura on 29 January 1976, the son of Gaye and Rob Davidson, and is of Ngāi Tahu descent. His father was a locomotive driver and later a lawyer, who died in 2020 at the age of 69. The elder Davidson had been married to Lianne Dalziel, the mayor of Christchurch from 2013 to 2022, for 25 years until his death. Davidson's father and grandfather had both previously unsuccessfully run for Christchurch City Council. Davidson was previously an environmental scientist. He worked for the Earthquake Commission for seven years. Davidson also worked as an operational manager at Whitiora, a skills and employment centre.

== Local government ==
Davidson first entered local politics in 2013, when he was elected to the Shirley-Papanui Community Board. From 2016 to 2022 Davidson was a councillor for Christchurch City Council, representing the Papanui ward. He was elected at the age of 40. Davidson was chairperson of the urban development and transport committee, and is an advocate for cycleways and better urban transport. He has supported the re-opening of Edgeware pool, which was closed in 2006. Davidson lost the Papanui ward in 2022 to Victoria Henstock.

In the 2025 Christchurch City Council elections, Davidson was a candidate for the Innes ward on the Waipapa Papanui-Innes-Central community board, standing for The People's Choice. Davidson was elected to Parliament during the local election and had said that if he was also elected to the community board he intended to donate that salary to the mayor's welfare fund. He was successfully elected to the Waipapa Papanui-Innes-Central community board.

== Member of Parliament ==
New Zealand Parliament
Years	Term	Electorate	List	Party
2025–present	54th	List	19	Green

Davidson contested the Ilam electorate in the 2023 election as a Green Party candidate. He was 19th on the party list. He was unsuccessful in winning the seat, placing fourth, and was not initially high enough on the party list to be allocated a seat.

Davidson was elected to parliament on 6 October 2025 to fill the list vacancy arising from the resignation of Benjamin Doyle.

Davidson is running again in the 2026 general election as the Green Party's candidate for Ilam. He is also ranked 20th on their party list. On 7 November, Davidson came third place in Ilam with 4,261 votes, based on provisional results. Due to his lower list ranking, Davidson was not re-elected to Parliament via the party vote.
