= Candidates in the 2014 New Zealand general election by electorate =

New Zealand political candidates in the MMP era
Year	Party list	Candidates
1996	party lists	by electorate
1999	party lists	by electorate
2002	party lists	by electorate
2005	party lists	by electorate
2008	party lists	by electorate
2011	party lists	by electorate
2014	party lists	by electorate
2017	party lists	by electorate
2020	party lists	by electorate
2023	party lists	by electorate
2026	party lists	by electorate

71 members of the New Zealand House of Representatives were elected in the general election on 20 September 2014.

== General electorates ==
=== Auckland Central ===
2014 general election: Auckland Central
Notes:	Blue background denotes an incumbent. Pink background denotes a current list MP. Yellow background denotes a retiring MP.			
Party	Candidate	Notes	List #	Source
Labour	Jacinda Ardern	List MP since 2008	5	
National	Nikki Kaye	Incumbent since 2008	19	
ACT	Dasha Kovalenko		7	
Conservative	Regan Monahan			
Money Free	Jordan Osmaston			
Internet	Miriam Pierard		6	
Green	Denise Roche	List MP since 2011	13	
Climate	Peter Whitmore			
Withdrawn candidates and retiring MPs
Legalise Cannabis	Richard Neutgens	Announced, but not on final candidate list		

=== Bay of Plenty ===
2014 general election: Bay of Plenty
Notes:	Blue background denotes an incumbent. Pink background denotes a current list MP. Yellow background denotes a retiring MP.			
Party	Candidate	Notes	List #	Source
Conservative	Deborah Cunliffe		17	
NZ First	Ray Dolman		19	
Independent Coalition	Brendan Horan	NZ First List MP 2011–2012, Independent since 2012	1	
Democrats	Tracy Livingston		19	
National	Todd Muller		59	
United Future	Ben Rickard		5	
Labour	Clare Wilson		50	
Withdrawn candidates and retiring MPs
National	Tony Ryall	MP since 1990; Incumbent since 1996		

=== Botany ===
2014 general election: Botany
Notes:	Blue background denotes an incumbent. Pink background denotes a current list MP. Yellow background denotes a retiring MP.			
Party	Candidate	Notes	List #	Source
Independent	David John McCormick			
Labour	Tofik Mamedov		60	
National	Jami-Lee Ross	Incumbent since 2011 by-election	29	
Conservative	Paul Young		10	
Withdrawn candidates and retiring MPs
United Future	Ram Parkash	Announced, but not on final candidate list		

=== Christchurch Central ===
2014 general election: Christchurch Central
Notes:	Blue background denotes an incumbent. Pink background denotes a current list MP. Yellow background denotes a retiring MP.			
Party	Candidate	Notes	List #	Source
NZ First	George Abraham		18	
Democrats	Robin Columbus		12	
Conservative	Michael Cooke			
Māori Party	Lenis Davidson		20	
Labour	Tony Milne		36	
Green	David Moorhouse		21	
ACT	Toni Severin		11	
National	Nicky Wagner	List MP 2005–2011, Incumbent since 2011	25	
Withdrawn candidates and retiring MPs
Legalise Cannabis	Rob Wilkinson	Announced, but instead standing for Christchurch East		

=== Christchurch East ===
2014 general election: Christchurch East
Notes:	Blue background denotes an incumbent. Pink background denotes a current list MP. Yellow background denotes a retiring MP.			
Party	Candidate	Notes	List #	Source
Conservative	Leighton Baker			
National	Jo Hayes	List MP since January 2014	47	
Māori Party	Tania Mataki		21	
Green	Mojo Mathers	List MP since 2011	9	
United Future	Sam Park		11	
Legalise Cannabis	Rob Wilkinson	Originally announced for Christchurch Central	8	
Labour	Poto Williams	Incumbent since 2013 by-election	28	
Withdrawn candidates and retiring MPs
Legalise Cannabis	Paula Lambert	Announced, but replaced on final candidate list		

=== Clutha-Southland ===
2014 general election: Clutha-Southland
Notes:	Blue background denotes an incumbent. Pink background denotes a current list MP. Yellow background denotes a retiring MP.			
Party	Candidate	Notes	List #	Source
Conservative	Lachlan Ashton			
National	Todd Barclay		54	
Independent Coalition	Karl Barkley		7	
Labour	Liz Craig		32	
Green	Rachael Goldsmith		30	
Democrats	Jason Jobsis		9	
ACT	Don Nicolson		5	
Ban 1080	James Veint		4	
Withdrawn candidates and retiring MPs
National	Bill English	Standing as List only; MP since 1990, incumbent since 1996		

=== Coromandel ===
2014 general election: Coromandel
Notes:	Blue background denotes an incumbent. Pink background denotes a current list MP. Yellow background denotes a retiring MP.			
Party	Candidate	Notes	List #	Source
Green	Catherine Delahunty	List MP since 2008	6	
Ban 1080	Mike Downard		1	
NZ First	Grant Ertel		29	
ACT	David Olsen		14	
Māori Party	Hiria Pakinga		17	
Labour	Korbinian Poschl			
National	Scott Simpson	Incumbent since 2011	45	
Conservative	David Walkden			

=== Dunedin North ===
2014 general election: Dunedin North
Notes:	Blue background denotes an incumbent. Pink background denotes a current list MP. Yellow background denotes a retiring MP.			
Party	Candidate	Notes	List #	Source
Labour	David Clark	Incumbent since 2011	26	
Conservative	Jonathan Daley			
Independent	Adrian Graamans			
Legalise Cannabis	Abe Gray		2	
Independent	Stan Lusby			
Democrats	Miriam Mowat		24	
Internet	Robert Stewart		26	
Green	Metiria Turei	List MP since 2002, Party co-leader	1	
National	Michael Woodhouse	List MP since 2008	20	

=== Dunedin South ===
2014 general election: Dunedin South
Notes:	Blue background denotes an incumbent. Pink background denotes a current list MP. Yellow background denotes a retiring MP.			
Party	Candidate	Notes	List #	Source
Legalise Cannabis	Julian Crawford		1	
Labour	Clare Curran	Incumbent since 2008		
Green	Shane Gallagher		43	
Conservative	Cindy Kerr			
Internet	Andrew LePine		30	
ACT	Colin Nicholls		36	
Democrats	Warren Voight		5	
National	Hamish Walker		65	

=== East Coast ===
2014 general election: East Coast
Notes:	Blue background denotes an incumbent. Pink background denotes a current list MP. Yellow background denotes a retiring MP.			
Party	Candidate	Notes	List #	Source
Conservative	Rick Drayson			
Labour	Moana Mackey	List MP since 2003	17	
Green	Gavin MacLean		47	
Internet	Patrick Salmon		16	
Democrats	Harry Alchin Smith		14	
NZ First	Mere Takoko			
National	Anne Tolley	List MP 1999–2002, Incumbent since 2005	12	

=== East Coast Bays ===
2014 general election: East Coast Bays
Notes:	Blue background denotes an incumbent. Pink background denotes a current list MP. Yellow background denotes a retiring MP.			
Party	Candidate	Notes	List #	Source
Ban 1080	Patricia Cheel		6	
Conservative	Colin Craig	Party leader	1	
National	Murray McCully	Incumbent 1987– present	11	
Labour	Greg Milner-White			
Green	Teresa Moore		26	
Withdrawn candidates and retiring MPs
NZ First	Andrew Williams	List MP 2011–2014, announced but not on final candidate list		

=== Epsom ===
2014 general election: Epsom
Notes:	Blue background denotes an incumbent. Pink background denotes a current list MP. Yellow background denotes a retiring MP.			
Party	Candidate	Notes	List #	Source
Green	Julie Anne Genter	List MP since 2011	8	
National	Paul Goldsmith	List MP since 2011	30	
Independent	Matthew Goode			
Independent	Grace Haden			
Independent	Adam Holland			
Independent	Susanna Kruger			
NZ First	Cliff Lyon		30	
Mana Party	Pat O'Dea		13	
Conservative	Christine Rankin		2	
ACT	David Seymour			
Labour	Michael Wood		39	
Withdrawn candidates and retiring MPs
ACT	John Banks	MP 1981–1999 (National); ACT MP since 2011		

=== Hamilton East ===
2014 general election: Hamilton East
Notes:	Blue background denotes an incumbent. Pink background denotes a current list MP. Yellow background denotes a retiring MP.			
Party	Candidate	Notes	List #	Source
Labour	Clifford Allen			
National	David Bennett	Incumbent since 2005	37	
Internet	Raymond Calver		28	
Conservative	Katrina Day			
Democrats	Carolyn McKenzie			
Green	Mark Servian		54	
ACT	Ron Smith		19	
NZ First	Richard Taurima		28	
United Future	Quentin Todd		9	

=== Hamilton West ===
2014 general election: Hamilton West
Notes:	Blue background denotes an incumbent. Pink background denotes a current list MP. Yellow background denotes a retiring MP.			
Party	Candidate	Notes	List #	Source
NZ First	Bill Gudgeon	List MP 2002–2005	24	
National	Tim Macindoe	Incumbent since 2008	28	
Conservative	Tony McKenna			
Labour	Sue Moroney	List MP since 2005	10	
ACT	Sara Muti		10	
Democrats	Mischele Rhodes		15	
Māori Party	Richard Te Ao			
Withdrawn candidates and retiring MPs
Green	Jennifer Lawless	Withdrew due to illness		

=== Helensville ===
2014 general election: Helensville
Notes:	Blue background denotes an incumbent. Pink background denotes a current list MP. Yellow background denotes a retiring MP.			
Party	Candidate	Notes	List #	Source
Independent	Penny Bright			
Conservative	Deborah Dougherty			
Green	Kennedy Graham	List MP since 2008	7	
Labour	Corie Haddock		53	
Internet	Laila Harré	Internet Party leader, Alliance list MP 1996–2002	2	
National	John Key	incumbent MP 2002–present	1	
ACT	Phelan Pirrie		12	
Independent	Brendan Whyte			

=== Hunua ===
2014 general election: Hunua
Notes:	Blue background denotes an incumbent. Pink background denotes a current list MP. Yellow background denotes a retiring MP.			
Party	Candidate	Notes	List #	Source
National	Andrew Bayly		55	
ACT	Ian Cummings		9	
Conservative	Neville Hudson			
Democrats	Huia Mitchell		21	
Māori Party	Thomas Phillips		14	
NZ First	Jon Reeves		15	
Labour	Arena Williams		40	
Withdrawn candidates and retiring MPs
National	Paul Hutchison	MP since 1999		

=== Hutt South ===
2014 general election: Hutt South
Notes:	Blue background denotes an incumbent. Pink background denotes a current list MP. Yellow background denotes a retiring MP.			
Party	Candidate	Notes	List #	Source
National	Chris Bishop		49	
Conservative	Gordon Copeland	Former United Future and Independent list MP		
Labour	Trevor Mallard	MP 1984–1990, Incumbent since 1996		
ACT	Grae O'Sullivan		37	
Independent	Jan Pajak			
NZ First	Mataroa Paroro		13	
United Future	Dave Stonyer		7	
Green	Holly Walker	List MP since 2011		

=== Ilam ===
2014 general election: Ilam
Notes:	Blue background denotes an incumbent. Pink background denotes a current list MP. Yellow background denotes a retiring MP.			
Party	Candidate	Notes	List #	Source
Internet	Beverley Ballantine		10	
National	Gerry Brownlee	Incumbent since 1996	4	
Labour	James Dann		51	
Green	John Kelcher		31	
Conservative	John Stringer		13	
ACT	Gareth Veale		8	
Māori Party	Benita Wakefield		24	

=== Invercargill ===
2014 general election: Invercargill
Notes:	Blue background denotes an incumbent. Pink background denotes a current list MP. Yellow background denotes a retiring MP.			
Party	Candidate	Notes	List #	Source
NZ First	Ria Bond		12	
Democrats	Stephnie de Ruyter	Party Leader	1	
National	Sarah Dowie		57	
Green	David Kennedy		18	
Labour	Lesley Soper	List MP 2005-2005, 2007–2008		
Conservative	Laura Storr			
Withdrawn candidates and retiring MPs
National	Eric Roy	MP 1993–2002 and 2005–2014		

=== Kaikōura ===
2014 general election: Kaikōura
Notes:	Blue background denotes an incumbent. Pink background denotes a current list MP. Yellow background denotes a retiring MP.			
Party	Candidate	Notes	List #	Source
Green	Steffan Browning	List MP since 2011	14	
NZ First	Steve Campbell		22	
ACT	Richard Evans		17	
Money Free	Ted Howard			
Conservative	Howard Hudson		19	
Democrats	John McCaskey		22	
National	Stuart Smith		62	
Ban 1080	Glen Tomlinson		5	
Labour	Janette Walker		46	
Withdrawn candidates and retiring MPs
National	Colin King	Incumbent 2005–2014, deselected by party		

=== Kelston ===
2014 general election: Kelston
Notes:	Blue background denotes an incumbent. Pink background denotes a current list MP. Yellow background denotes a retiring MP.			
Party	Candidate	Notes	List #	Source
NZ First	Anne Degia-Pala		21	
ACT	Bruce Haycock		30	
Green	Ruth Irwin		45	
Legalise Cannabis	Jeffrey Lye		5	
National	Chris Penk		68	
Internet	Roshni Sami		18	
Labour	Carmel Sepuloni	List MP 2008–2011	29	
Conservative	Paul Sommer			
United Future	Jason Woolston		6	
Withdrawn candidates
National	Claudette Hauiti	List MP 2013–2014	N/A	

=== Mana ===
2014 general election: Mana
Notes:	Blue background denotes an incumbent. Pink background denotes a current list MP. Yellow background denotes a retiring MP.			
Party	Candidate	Notes	List #	Source
Conservative	Roy Barry			
Democrats	Ron England		30	
Labour	Kris Faafoi	Incumbent since 2010		
Legalise Cannabis	Richard Goode		6	
Green	Jan Logie	List MP since 2011	10	
National	Hekia Parata	List MP since 2008	7	

=== Māngere ===
2014 general election: Māngere
Notes:	Blue background denotes an incumbent. Pink background denotes a current list MP. Yellow background denotes a retiring MP.			
Party	Candidate	Notes	List #	Source
Mana Party	James Papali'i		9	
Conservative	Edward Saafi		5	
Labour	William Sio	List MP 2008, Incumbent since 2008	14	
Green	Mua Strickson-Pua		58	
National	Misa Fia Turner		53	

=== Manukau East ===
2014 general election: Manukau East
Notes:	Blue background denotes an incumbent. Pink background denotes a current list MP. Yellow background denotes a retiring MP.			
Party	Candidate	Notes	List #	Source
National	Kanwal Singh Bakshi	List MP since 2008	32	
NZ First	Asenati Lole-Taylor	List MP since 2011	16	
Green	Umesh Perinpanayagam		24	
Labour	Jenny Salesa		31	
Conservative	Vili Taukolo			
Mana Party	Joe Trinder		23	
Communist League	Annalucia Vermunt			
Withdrawn candidates and retiring MPs
Labour	Ross Robertson	MP since 1987, Incumbent 1996–2014		

=== Manurewa ===
2014 general election: Manurewa
Notes:	Blue background denotes an incumbent. Pink background denotes a current list MP. Yellow background denotes a retiring MP.			
Party	Candidate	Notes	List #	Source
Māori Party	Raewyn Bhana		10	
National	Simeon Brown		64	
Mana Party	Yvonne Dainty		32	
NZ First	John Hall		27	
Conservative	Elliot Ikilei		20	
Green	Trish Tupou		59	
Labour	Louisa Wall	List MP 2008 & 2011, Incumbent since 2011	12	

=== Maungakiekie ===
2014 general election: Maungakiekie
Notes:	Blue background denotes an incumbent. Pink background denotes a current list MP. Yellow background denotes a retiring MP.			
Party	Candidate	Notes	List #	Source
Labour	Carol Beaumont	List MP 2008–2011, 2013–	27	
Communist League	Felicity Coggan			
Mana Party	Sitaleki Finau		21	
Green	Richard Leckinger		23	
National	Sam Lotu-Iiga	incumbent 2008–present	24	
United Future	Bryan Mockridge		8	
Conservative	Litia Simpson			

=== Mount Albert ===
2014 general election: Mount Albert
Notes:	Blue background denotes an incumbent. Pink background denotes a current list MP. Yellow background denotes a retiring MP.			
Party	Candidate	Notes	List #	Source
Mana Party	Joe Carolan		19	
Green	Jeanette Elley		19	
ACT	Tommy Fergusson		26	
Conservative	Jeffrey Johnson			
National	Melissa Lee		31	
Labour	David Shearer	Incumbent since 2009	13	
Human Rights Party	Anthony van den Heuvel			
Independent	Michael Wackrow			

=== Mount Roskill ===
2014 general election: Mount Roskill
Notes:	Blue background denotes an incumbent. Pink background denotes a current list MP. Yellow background denotes a retiring MP.			
Party	Candidate	Notes	List #	Source
NZ First	Mahesh Bindra		11	
Green	Barry Coates		16	
Conservative	Paul Davie			
Labour	Phil Goff	MP 1981–1990, and since 1993, Incumbent since 1996	16	
Mana Party	John Minto		4	
National	Parmjeet Parmar		48	

=== Napier ===
2014 general election: Napier
Notes:	Blue background denotes an incumbent. Pink background denotes a current list MP. Yellow background denotes a retiring MP.			
Party	Candidate	Notes	List #	Source
Green	Paul Bailey		38	
Conservative	Garth McVicar		3	
Labour	Stuart Nash	List MP 2008–2011		
Alliance	Mary O'Niell			
Democrats	Barry Pulford		17	
National	Wayne Walford		63	
Withdrawn candidates and retiring MPs
National	Chris Tremain	Incumbent 2005–2014		

=== Nelson ===
2014 general election: Nelson
Notes:	Blue background denotes an incumbent. Pink background denotes a current list MP. Yellow background denotes a retiring MP.			
Party	Candidate	Notes	List #	Source
Democrats	Adrian Bayly		28	
Conservative	John Green			
ACT	Paul Hufflett		31	
Money Free	Richard Osmaston			
Green	Colin Robertson		52	
National	Nick Smith	MP since 1990, Incumbent since 1996	13	
Labour	Maryan Street	List MP since 2005	15	
Withdrawn candidates and retiring MPs
Green	Aaryn Barlow	Deselected by party		

=== New Lynn ===
2014 general election: New Lynn
Notes:	Blue background denotes an incumbent. Pink background denotes a current list MP. Yellow background denotes a retiring MP.			
Party	Candidate	Notes	List #	Source
Labour	David Cunliffe	incumbent since 1999	1	
National	Tim Groser	List MP since 2005	14	
Democrats	Andrew Leitch		8	
Green	Daniel Rogers		32	
Conservative	Steve Taylor		8	

=== New Plymouth ===
2014 general election: New Plymouth
Notes:	Blue background denotes an incumbent. Pink background denotes a current list MP. Yellow background denotes a retiring MP.			
Party	Candidate	Notes	List #	Source
Legalise Cannabis	Jamie Dombroski		9	
ACT	James Gray		28	
Labour	Andrew Little	list MP since 2011	11	
Green	Sarah Roberts		51	
Conservative	Angela Storr			
National	Jonathan Young	incumbent since 2008	38	

=== North Shore ===
2014 general election: North Shore
Notes:	Blue background denotes an incumbent. Pink background denotes a current list MP. Yellow background denotes a retiring MP.			
Party	Candidate	Notes	List #	Source
National	Maggie Barry	incumbent since 2011	40	
ACT	Nick Kearney		15	
Democrats	Tim Leitch		29	
Conservative	Melissa Perkin		4	
Green	Brett Stansfield		56	
Labour	Claire Szabó		38	

=== Northcote ===
2014 general election: Northcote
Notes:	Blue background denotes an incumbent. Pink background denotes a current list MP. Yellow background denotes a retiring MP.			
Party	Candidate	Notes	List #	Source
National	Jonathan Coleman	incumbent since 2005	10	
Labour	Richard Hills		47	
Internet	Gil Ho		12	
ACT	Tim Kronfeld		20	
United Future	Damian Light		3	
Green	Anne-Elise Smithson		34	
Conservative	Matthew Webster			

=== Northland ===
2014 general election: Northland
Notes:	Blue background denotes an incumbent. Pink background denotes a current list MP. Yellow background denotes a retiring MP.			
Party	Candidate	Notes	List #	Source
Green	David Clendon	List MP since 2009	11	
ACT	Craig Nelson		35	
Labour	Willow-Jean Prime		34	
Focus	Ken Rintoul	Party leader	1	
Independent	Murray Robertson			
National	Mike Sabin	incumbent since 2011	44	
Conservative	Mel Taylor		7	
Money Free	Glen Timms			
Democrats	David Wilson		20	

=== Ōhāriu ===
2014 general election: Ōhāriu
Notes:	Blue background denotes an incumbent. Pink background denotes a current list MP. Yellow background denotes a retiring MP.			
Party	Candidate	Notes	List #	Source
Labour	Ginny Andersen		37	
Conservative	Michael Brunner		15	
United Future	Peter Dunne	Labour MP 1984–1994, Independent 1994, United Future 1994 to present	1	
ACT	Sean Fitzpatrick		16	
Independent	Sue Hamill			
National	Brett Hudson		39	
Democrats	Alida Steemson		6	
Green	Tane Woodley		28	

=== Ōtaki ===
2014 general election: Ōtaki
Notes:	Blue background denotes an incumbent. Pink background denotes a current list MP. Yellow background denotes a retiring MP.			
Party	Candidate	Notes	List #	Source
Green	Maddy Drew		42	
National	Nathan Guy	List MP 2005–2008, incumbent since 2008	16	
Conservative	Anne Lovelock			
Labour	Rob McCann			
Independent	Frederick MacDonald			
Independent	Amanda Vickers			

=== Pakuranga ===
2014 general election: Pakuranga
Notes:	Blue background denotes an incumbent. Pink background denotes a current list MP. Yellow background denotes a retiring MP.			
Party	Candidate	Notes	List #	Source
Conservative	Andrew Craig			
Labour	Barry Kirker	Contested North Shore for NewLabour in 1990		
ACT	Jamie Whyte		1	
National	Maurice Williamson	incumbent since 1987	35	

=== Palmerston North ===
2014 general election: Palmerston North
Notes:	Blue background denotes an incumbent. Pink background denotes a current list MP. Yellow background denotes a retiring MP.			
Party	Candidate	Notes	List #	Source
NZ First	Darroch Ball		10	
Internet	Pani Farvid		14	
Labour	Iain Lees-Galloway	incumbent 2008–present	24	
National	Jono Naylor	Current Mayor of Palmerston North	51	
Conservative	Mark Pearce			

=== Papakura ===
2014 general election: Papakura
Notes:	Blue background denotes an incumbent. Pink background denotes a current list MP. Yellow background denotes a retiring MP.			
Party	Candidate	Notes	List #	Source
NZ First	Brent Catchpole	List MP 2002–2005	17	
National	Judith Collins	incumbent since 2002	6	
Green	Caroline Conroy		39	
Mana Party	Roger Fowler		31	
Māori Party	Ann Kendall		16	
Labour	Jerome Mika		35	
Conservative	Kevin Stitt			
ACT	John Thompson		40	

=== Port Hills ===
2014 general election: Port Hills
Notes:	Blue background denotes an incumbent. Pink background denotes a current list MP. Yellow background denotes a retiring MP.			
Party	Candidate	Notes	List #	Source
Conservative	Chris Brosnan			
Labour	Ruth Dyson	Incumbent 1993–1996 and 1999–present, List 1996–1999		
Democrats	Gary Gribben		27	
National	Nuk Korako		50	
NZ First	Denis O'Rourke	List MP since 2011	7	
ACT	Geoff Russell		39	
Green	Eugenie Sage	List MP since 2011	4	

=== Rangitata ===
2014 general election: Rangitata
Notes:	Blue background denotes an incumbent. Pink background denotes a current list MP. Yellow background denotes a retiring MP.			
Party	Candidate	Notes	List #	Source
ACT	Tom Corbett		24	
Labour	Steven Gibson		56	
National	Jo Goodhew	incumbent since 2005	21	
Conservative	Oliver Vitali			

=== Rangitīkei ===
2014 general election: Rangitīkei
Notes:	Blue background denotes an incumbent. Pink background denotes a current list MP. Yellow background denotes a retiring MP.			
Party	Candidate	Notes	List #	Source
Conservative	Roy Brown		9	
National	Ian McKelvie	incumbent since 2011	41	
NZ First	Romuald Rudzki		14	
Labour	Deborah Russell		33	
ACT	Neil Wilson		41	

=== Rimutaka ===
2014 general election: Rimutaka
Notes:	Blue background denotes an incumbent. Pink background denotes a current list MP. Yellow background denotes a retiring MP.			
Party	Candidate	Notes	List #	Source
Labour	Chris Hipkins	incumbent 2008–present	9	
National	Lewis Holden	Former chairman of NZ Republic	66	
NZ First	Aaron Hunt		26	
Conservative	Philip Lynch		18	
Green	Susanne Ruthven		25	

=== Rodney ===
2014 general election: Rodney
Notes:	Blue background denotes an incumbent. Pink background denotes a current list MP. Yellow background denotes a retiring MP.			
Party	Candidate	Notes	List #	Source
Labour	Eric Bolt			
Conservative	Anton Heyns		14	
ACT	Beth Houlbrooke		4	
Green	Malcolm McAll		35	
NZ First	Tracey Martin	List MP since 2011	2	
National	Mark Mitchell	Incumbent since 2011	42	

=== Rongotai ===
2014 general election: Rongotai
Notes:	Blue background denotes an incumbent. Pink background denotes a current list MP. Yellow background denotes a retiring MP.			
Party	Candidate	Notes	List #	Source
Climate	Aaron Carter			
United Future	Sultan Eusoff		4	
National	Chris Finlayson	List MP since 2005	8	
Labour	Annette King	MP 1984– current	4	
Green	Russel Norman	List MP since 2008, Party co-leader	2	
Patriotic Revolutionary Front	Johnny Overton			
Mana Party	Ariana Paretutanganui-Tamati		25	16
NZ First	Brent Pierson		25	
Independent	Don Richards			
Conservative	Bruce Welsh			
Withdrawn candidates and retiring MPs
Legalise Cannabis	David Kent	Announced, but not on final candidate list		

=== Rotorua ===
2014 general election: Rotorua
Notes:	Blue background denotes an incumbent. Pink background denotes a current list MP. Yellow background denotes a retiring MP.			
Party	Candidate	Notes	List #	Source
Labour	Tāmati Coffey		30	
Conservative	Michael Davidson			
National	Todd McClay	Incumbent since 2008	23	
ACT	Lyall Russell			
NZ First	Fletcher Tabuteau		4	

=== Selwyn ===
2014 general election: Selwyn
Notes:	Blue background denotes an incumbent. Pink background denotes a current list MP. Yellow background denotes a retiring MP.			
Party	Candidate	Notes	List #	Source
National	Amy Adams	Incumbent since 2008	15	
Conservative	Roger Clibborn			
Labour	Gordon Dickson			
Māori Party	Sheryl Gardyne		22	
ACT	Paul Gilbert		27	
Green	Peter Hill		44	
NZ First	Bill Woods		31	

=== Tāmaki ===
2014 general election: Tāmaki
Notes:	Blue background denotes an incumbent. Pink background denotes a current list MP. Yellow background denotes a retiring MP.			
Party	Candidate	Notes	List #	Source
Mana Party	Lisa Gibson		27	
ACT	Mike Milne		18	
Conservative	Danny Mountain			
National	Simon O'Connor	Incumbent since 2011	43	
Green	Dorthe Siggaard		55	
Labour	Chao-Fu Wu		57	

=== Taranaki-King Country ===
2014 general election: Taranaki-King Country
Notes:	Blue background denotes an incumbent. Pink background denotes a current list MP. Yellow background denotes a retiring MP.			
Party	Candidate	Notes	List #	Source
Conservative	Edward Aish			
Democrats	David Espin		25	
Labour	Penny Gaylor		45	
Internet	Grant Keinzley		22	
National	Barbara Kuriger		58	
Green	Robert Moore		50	
Withdrawn candidates and retiring MPs
National	Shane Ardern	MP since 1998		

=== Taupō ===
2014 general election: Taupō
Notes:	Blue background denotes an incumbent. Pink background denotes a current list MP. Yellow background denotes a retiring MP.			
Party	Candidate	Notes	List #	Source
Conservative	Lance Gedge			
Democrats	John Pemberton	Party President	3	
NZ First	Edwin Perry	List MP 2002–05	23	
Green	Dave Robinson		53	
United Future	Alan Simmons		2	
Labour	Jamie Strange		54	
National	Louise Upston	Incumbent since 2008	27	
Māori Party	Claire Winitana		18	

=== Tauranga ===
2014 general election: Tauranga
Notes:	Blue background denotes an incumbent. Pink background denotes a current list MP. Yellow background denotes a retiring MP.			
Party	Candidate	Notes	List #	Source
National	Simon Bridges	Incumbent since 2008	18	
Conservative	Nathaniel Heslop			
Labour	Rachel Jones		25	
Independent	Rusty Kane			
Independent	Yvette Lamare			
Green	Ian McLean		49	
United Future	James Maxwell		10	
NZ First	Clayton Mitchell		6	
Māori Party	Verna Ohia-Gate		15	
Independent Coalition	Michael O'Neill		2	
ACT	Stuart Pedersen			

=== Te Atatū ===
2014 general election: Te Atatū
Notes:	Blue background denotes an incumbent. Pink background denotes a current list MP. Yellow background denotes a retiring MP.			
Party	Candidate	Notes	List #	Source
ACT	Stephen Fletcher		13	
Legalise Cannabis	Adrian McDermott		11	
National	Alfred Ngaro	List MP since 2011	34	
Conservative	Paddy O'Rourke			
Green	Gary Stewart		57	
Labour	Phil Twyford	incumbent since 2008	7	
Internet	Chris Yong		5	

=== Tukituki ===
2014 general election: Tukituki
Notes:	Blue background denotes an incumbent. Pink background denotes a current list MP. Yellow background denotes a retiring MP.			
Party	Candidate	Notes	List #	Source
National	Craig Foss	incumbent since 2005	17	
Conservative	Stephen Jenkinson			
ACT	Duncan Lennox		33	
Labour	Anna Lorck			
Legalise Cannabis	Romana Manning		7	
Green	Chris Perley		29	
Democrats	Dick Ryan		13	

=== Upper Harbour ===
2014 general election: Upper Harbour
Notes:	Blue background denotes an incumbent. Pink background denotes a current list MP. Yellow background denotes a retiring MP.			
Party	Candidate	Notes	List #	Source
National	Paula Bennett	List MP 2005–2008, MP for Waitakere 2008–2014	9	
ACT	Stephen Berry		6	
Conservative	Callum Blair		6	
Green	Nicholas Mayne		48	
Mana Party	Makelesi Ngata		15	
Labour	Hermann Retzlaff			
Māori Party	Hinurewa Te Hau		13	

=== Waikato ===
2014 general election: Waikato
Notes:	Blue background denotes an incumbent. Pink background denotes a current list MP. Yellow background denotes a retiring MP.			
Party	Candidate	Notes	List #	Source
ACT	Mike Burrow		22	
Conservative	Brian Dobbs		12	
Labour	Christine Greer		44	
Democrats	Katherine Ransom		4	
NZ First	Barbara Stewart	MP 2002–08 and since 2011	5	
National	Lindsay Tisch	MP since 1999, Incumbent since 2008	26	

=== Waimakariri ===
2014 general election: Waimakariri
Notes:	Blue background denotes an incumbent. Pink background denotes a current list MP. Yellow background denotes a retiring MP.			
Party	Candidate	Notes	List #	Source
Democrats	Peter Adcock-White		18	
Labour	Clayton Cosgrove	MP since 1999, List MP since 2011	8	
National	Matt Doocey	Runner-up 2013 Christchurch East by-election	56	
Green	Reuben Hunt		37	
Conservative	Benjamin Price			
NZ First	Richard Prosser	List MP since 2011	3	
Māori Party	Aroha Reriti-Crofts		12	
Withdrawn candidates and retiring MPs
National	Kate Wilkinson	MP since 2005		

=== Wairarapa ===
2014 general election: Wairarapa
Notes:	Blue background denotes an incumbent. Pink background denotes a current list MP. Yellow background denotes a retiring MP.			
Party	Candidate	Notes	List #	Source
ACT	Shane Atkinson		21	
Green	John Hart		17	
Labour	Kieran McAnulty			
NZ First	Ron Mark	List MP 1996–2008; current Mayor of Carterton	9	
Conservative	Brent Reid		16	
National	Alastair Scott		61	
Māori Party	Ra Smith		19	
Withdrawn candidates and retiring MPs
National	John Hayes	MP since 2005		

=== Waitaki ===
2014 general election: Waitaki
Notes:	Blue background denotes an incumbent. Pink background denotes a current list MP. Yellow background denotes a retiring MP.			
Party	Candidate	Notes	List #	Source
Labour	Glenda Alexander			
Conservative	Donald Aubrey		11	
Green	Sue Coutts		40	
National	Jacqui Dean	MP since 2005, Incumbent since 2008	36	
Democrats	Hessel Van Wieren		7	

=== Wellington Central ===
2014 general election: Wellington Central
Notes:	Blue background denotes an incumbent. Pink background denotes a current list MP. Yellow background denotes a retiring MP.			
Party	Candidate	Notes	List #	Source
NZ First	Hugh Barr		20	
National	Paul Foster-Bell	list MP since 2013	46	
Legalise Cannabis	Alistair Gregory		4	
Conservative	Brian Hooper			
Independent	Huimaono Karena Puhi			
Democrats	James Knuckey		10	
Labour	Grant Robertson	incumbent since 2008	3	
Independent	Peter Robinson			
Green	James Shaw		12	
Internet	Callum Valentine		20	

=== West Coast-Tasman ===
2014 general election: West Coast-Tasman
Notes:	Blue background denotes an incumbent. Pink background denotes a current list MP. Yellow background denotes a retiring MP.			
Party	Candidate	Notes	List #	Source
Money Free	Laurence Boomert			
Green	Kevin Hague	List MP since 2008	3	
Conservative	Claire Holley			
Labour	Damien O'Connor	incumbent 1993–2008, list MP 2008–2011, incumbent since 2011	22	
National	Maureen Pugh	Former Mayor, Westland District Council	52	
Ban 1080	Peter Salter		3	
Independent	Steven Wilkinson			

=== Whanganui ===
2014 general election: Whanganui
Notes:	Blue background denotes an incumbent. Pink background denotes a current list MP. Yellow background denotes a retiring MP.			
Party	Candidate	Notes	List #	Source
National	Chester Borrows	Incumbent since 2005	22	
ACT	Alan Davidson		25	
Conservative	Kim MacIntyre			
Labour	Hamish McDouall		41	
Democrats	Heather Marion Smith		26	
Māori Party	Nancy Tuaine		6	

=== Whangarei ===
2014 general election: Whangarei
Notes:	Blue background denotes an incumbent. Pink background denotes a current list MP. Yellow background denotes a retiring MP.			
Party	Candidate	Notes	List #	Source
Internet	David Currin		8	
Green	Paul Doherty		41	
Labour	Kelly Ellis		52	
ACT	Robin Grieve		3	
Māori Party	Anaru Kaipo		9	
Focus	Les King		2	
Democrats	Chris Leitch	Deputy Party Leader, runner-up Tāmaki 1992 by-election (as Alliance)	2	
Conservative	Don Nightingale		8	
NZ First	Pita Paraone	List MP 2002–2008	8	
National	Shane Reti		60	
Withdrawn candidates and retiring MPs
National	Phil Heatley	MP since 1999		

=== Wigram ===
2014 general election: Wigram
Notes:	Blue background denotes an incumbent. Pink background denotes a current list MP. Yellow background denotes a retiring MP.			
Party	Candidate	Notes	List #	Source
ACT	Shaun Grieve		29	
Economic Euthenics	Tubby Hansen			
Internet	Lois McClintock		24	
Conservative	Mark Peters			
Māori Party	Te Whe Phillips		23	
Democrats	John Ring		23	
National	Karl Varley		67	
Green	Richard Wesley		33	
Labour	Megan Woods	Incumbent since 2011	20	

== Māori electorates ==
=== Hauraki-Waikato ===
2014 general election: Hauraki-Waikato
Notes:	Blue background denotes an incumbent. Pink background denotes a current list MP. Yellow background denotes a retiring MP.			
Party	Candidate	Notes	List #	Source
Māori Party	Susan Cullen			
Mana Party	Angeline Greensill		11	
Labour	Nanaia Mahuta	List MP 1996–1999, MP Te Tai Hauauru 1999–2002. MP Tainui 2002–2008, incumbent since 2008	6	

=== Ikaroa-Rāwhiti ===
2014 general election: Ikaroa-Rāwhiti
Notes:	Blue background denotes an incumbent. Pink background denotes a current list MP. Yellow background denotes a retiring MP.			
Party	Candidate	Notes	List #	Source
Independent	Cathryn Eden			
Māori Party	Marama Fox		2	
Green	Henare Kani		46	
Mana Party	Te Hāmua Nikora		7	
Expatriate	Vicky Rose			
Labour	Meka Whaitiri	Incumbent since 2013	19	

=== Tāmaki Makaurau ===
2014 general election: Tāmaki Makaurau
Notes:	Blue background denotes an incumbent. Pink background denotes a current list MP. Yellow background denotes a retiring MP.			
Party	Candidate	Notes	List #	Source
Green	Marama Davidson		15	
Independent	Raewyn Harrison			
Labour	Peeni Henare			
Māori Party	Rangi McLean			
Mana Party	Kereama Pene			
Withdrawn candidates and retiring MPs
Māori Party	Pita Sharples	Incumbent since 2005, party co-leader		

=== Te Tai Hauāuru ===
2014 general election: Te Tai Hauāuru
Notes:	Blue background denotes an incumbent. Pink background denotes a current list MP. Yellow background denotes a retiring MP.			
Party	Candidate	Notes	List #	Source
Green	Jack McDonald		20	
Māori Party	Chris McKenzie		3	
Labour	Adrian Rurawhe			
Mana Party	Jordan Winiata			
Withdrawn candidates and retiring MPs
Māori Party	Tariana Turia	Incumbent since 1999; MP since 1996 (originally Labour), party co-leader		

=== Te Tai Tokerau ===
2014 general election: Te Tai Tokerau
Notes:	Blue background denotes an incumbent. Pink background denotes a current list MP. Yellow background denotes a retiring MP.			
Party	Candidate	Notes	List #	Source
Labour	Kelvin Davis	List MP 2008–11, list MP from June 2014	18	
Independent	Clinton Dearlove	Stood for Mana in Te Tai Tonga, 2011		
Mana Party	Hone Harawira	Incumbent since 2005 (Māori Party until 2011), party leader	1	
Māori Party	Te Hira Paenga		4	

=== Te Tai Tonga ===
2014 general election: Te Tai Tonga
Notes:	Blue background denotes an incumbent. Pink background denotes a current list MP. Yellow background denotes a retiring MP.			
Party	Candidate	Notes	List #	Source
Mana Party	Georgina Beyer	Labour MP 1999–2007		
Māori Party	Ngaire Button		5	
Legalise Cannabis	Emma-Jane Kingi		3	
Green	Dora Langsbury		27	
Democrats	Hahona Rakiraki Tamiti			
Labour	Rino Tirikatene	MP since 2011		

=== Waiariki ===
2014 general election: Waiariki
Notes:	Blue background denotes an incumbent. Pink background denotes a current list MP. Yellow background denotes a retiring MP.			
Party	Candidate	Notes	List #	Source
Māori Party	Te Ururoa Flavell	incumbent since 2005	1	
Independent Coalition	Pat Spellman		3	
Mana Party	Annette Sykes		3	
Labour	Rawiri Waititi			
