= Party lists in the 2014 New Zealand general election =

New Zealand political candidates in the MMP era
Year	Party list	Candidates
1996	party lists	by electorate
1999	party lists	by electorate
2002	party lists	by electorate
2005	party lists	by electorate
2008	party lists	by electorate
2011	party lists	by electorate
2014	party lists	by electorate
2017	party lists	by electorate
2020	party lists	by electorate
2023	party lists	by electorate
2026	party lists	by electorate

The 2014 New Zealand general election, which was held on 20 September 2014, saw the election of 121 candidates — 71 from electorates, 1 overhang, and the remaining 49 from ranked party lists. This page lists candidates by party, including their ranking by party list where applicable.

Within each section, parties are ordered according to their last election result. Where a ranked party list has not been published, or does not cover all announced candidates, candidates are displayed in alphabetical order.

== Incumbent parliamentary parties ==
=== National Party ===
The New Zealand National Party released its party list on 27 July 2014. It has also named candidates for every electorate. One current MP, Claudette Hauiti, was initially announced as the party's candidate for Kelston, but subsequently decided to leave politics. The party list was altered to elevate her replacement, Christopher Penk, from his initial 75th ranking.

Rank	Name	Incumbency	Contesting electorate	Previous rank	Change	Initial results	Later changes
1	John Key	Electorate	Helensville	1	0	✓ Won Helensville	✗ Left parliament in 2017
2	Bill English	Electorate		2	0	✓ Elected from list	
3	David Carter	List		10	+7	✓ Elected from list	
4	Gerry Brownlee	Electorate	Ilam	4	0	✓ Won Ilam	
5	Steven Joyce	List		13	+8	✓ Elected from list	
6	Judith Collins	Electorate	Papakura	7	+1	✓ Won Papakura	
7	Hekia Parata	List	Mana	18	+11	✓ Elected from list	
8	Chris Finlayson	List	Rongotai	9	+1	✓ Elected from list	
9	Paula Bennett	Electorate	Upper Harbour	14	+5	✓ Won Upper Harbour	
10	Jonathan Coleman	Electorate	Northcote	16	+6	✓ Won Northcote	
11	Murray McCully	Electorate	East Coast Bays	11	0	✓ Won East Coast Bays	
12	Anne Tolley	Electorate	East Coast	8	−4	✓ Won East Coast	
13	Nick Smith	Electorate	Nelson	6	−7	✓ Won Nelson	
14	Tim Groser	List	New Lynn	12	−2	✓ Elected from list	✗ Left parliament in 2015
15	Amy Adams	Electorate	Selwyn	28	+13	✓ Won Selwyn	
16	Nathan Guy	Electorate	Ōtaki	20	+4	✓ Won Ōtaki	
17	Craig Foss	Electorate	Tukituki	21	+4	✓ Won Tukituki	
18	Simon Bridges	Electorate	Tauranga	30	+12	✓ Won Tauranga	
19	Nikki Kaye	Electorate	Auckland Central	33	+14	✓ Won Auckland Central	
20	Michael Woodhouse	List	Dunedin North	31	+11	✓ Elected from list	
21	Jo Goodhew	Electorate	Rangitata	23	+2	✓ Won Rangitata	
22	Chester Borrows	Electorate	Whanganui	32	+10	✓ Won Whanganui	
23	Todd McClay	Electorate	Rotorua	47	+24	✓ Won Rotorua	
24	Sam Lotu-Iiga	Electorate	Maungakiekie	29	+5	✓ Won Maungakiekie	
25	Nicky Wagner	Electorate	Christchurch Central	42	+17	✓ Won Christchurch Central	
26	Lindsay Tisch	Electorate	Waikato	24	−2	✓ Won Waikato	
27	Louise Upston	Electorate	Taupō	44	+17	✓ Won Taupō	
28	Tim Macindoe	Electorate	Hamilton West	49	+21	✓ Won Hamilton West	
29	Jami-Lee Ross	Electorate	Botany	54	+25	✓ Won Botany	
30	Paul Goldsmith	List	Epsom	39	+9	✓ Elected from list	
31	Melissa Lee	List	Mount Albert	34	+3	✓ Elected from list	
32	Kanwaljit Singh Bakshi	List	Manukau East	35	+3	✓ Elected from list	
33	Jian Yang	List		36	+3	✓ Elected from list	
34	Alfred Ngaro	List	Te Atatū	37	+3	✓ Elected from list	
35	Maurice Williamson	Electorate	Pakuranga	19	−16	✓ Won Pakuranga	
36	Jacqui Dean	Electorate	Waitaki	41	+5	✓ Won Waitaki	
37	David Bennett	Electorate	Hamilton East	48	+11	✓ Won Hamilton East	
38	Jonathan Young	Electorate	New Plymouth	45	+7	✓ Won New Plymouth	
39	Brett Hudson		Ōhariu	73	+34	✓ Elected from list	
40	Maggie Barry	Electorate	North Shore	57	+17	✓ Won North Shore	
41	Ian McKelvie	Electorate	Rangitīkei	58	+17	✓ Won Rangitīkei	
42	Mark Mitchell	Electorate	Rodney	59	+17	✓ Won Rodney	
43	Simon O'Connor	Electorate	Tāmaki	62	+19	✓ Won Tāmaki	
44	Mike Sabin	Electorate	Northland	60	+16	✓ Won Northland	✗ Left parliament in 2015
45	Scott Simpson	Electorate	Coromandel	61	+16	✓ Won Coromandel	
46	Paul Foster-Bell	List	Wellington Central	56	+10	✓ Elected from list	
47	Jo Hayes	List	Christchurch East	64	+17	✓ Elected from list	
48	Parmjeet Parmar		Mount Roskill	—	—	✓ Elected from list	
49	Chris Bishop		Hutt South	—	—	✓ Elected from list	
50	Nuk Korako		Port Hills	—	—	✓ Elected from list	
51	Jono Naylor		Palmerston North	—	—	✓ Elected from list	
52	Maureen Pugh		West Coast-Tasman	—	—		✓ Replaced Tim Groser in 2015
53	Misa Fia Turner		Māngere	—	—		
54	Todd Barclay		Clutha-Southland	—	—	✓ Won Clutha-Southland	
55	Andrew Bayly		Hunua	—	—	✓ Won Hunua	
56	Matt Doocey		Waimakariri	—	—	✓ Won Waimakariri	
57	Sarah Dowie		Invercargill	—	—	✓ Won Invercargill	
58	Barbara Kuriger		Taranaki-King Country	—	—	✓ Won Taranaki-King Country	
59	Todd Muller		Bay of Plenty	—	—	✓ Won Bay of Plenty	
60	Shane Reti		Whangarei	—	—	✓ Won Whangarei	
61	Alastair Scott		Wairarapa	—	—	✓ Won Wairarapa	
62	Stuart Smith		Kaikōura	—	—	✓ Won Kaikōura	
63	Wayne Walford		Napier	—	—		
64	Simeon Brown		Manurewa	—	—		
65	Hamish Walker		Dunedin South	—	—		
66	Lewis Holden		Rimutaka	—	—		
67	Karl Varley		Wigram	75	+8		
68	Chris Penk		Kelston	—	—		
69	Linda Cooper			74	+5		
70	Letitia O'Dwyer			—	—		
71	Mark Bridges			—	—		
72	Boris Sokratov			—	—		
73	Matthew Evetts			—	—		
74	Carolyn O'Fallon			70	−4		
75	Charlotte Littlewood			—	—		

=== Labour Party ===
The New Zealand Labour Party released its ranked party list and named its electorate candidates prior to the close of nominations.

Rank	Name	Incumbency	Contesting electorate	Previous rank	Change	Initial results	Later changes
1	David Cunliffe	Electorate	New Lynn	3	+2	✓ Won New Lynn	✗ Left parliament in 2014
2	David Parker	List		4	+2	✓ Elected from list	
3	Grant Robertson	Electorate	Wellington Central	14	+11	✓ Won Wellington Central	
4	Annette King	Electorate	Rongotai	2	−2	✓ Won Rongotai	
5	Jacinda Ardern	List	Auckland Central	13	+8	✓ Elected from list	✓ Replaced David Shearer in the 2017 Mount Albert by-election
6	Nanaia Mahuta	Electorate	Hauraki-Waikato	12	+6	✓ Won Hauraki-Waikato	
7	Phil Twyford	Electorate	Te Atatū	33	+26	✓ Won Te Atatū	
8	Clayton Cosgrove	List	Waimakariri	8	0	✓ Elected from list	
9	Chris Hipkins	Electorate	Rimutaka	30	+21	✓ Won Rimutaka	
10	Sue Moroney	List	Hamilton West	10	0	✓ Elected from list	
11	Andrew Little	List	New Plymouth	15	+4	✓ Elected from list	
12	Louisa Wall	Electorate	Manurewa	—	—	✓ Won Manurewa	
13	David Shearer	Electorate	Mount Albert	31	+18	✓ Won Mount Albert	✗ Left parliament in 2016
14	William Sio	Electorate	Māngere	17	+3	✓ Won Māngere	
15	Maryan Street	List	Nelson	7	−8	✗ Lost seat	
16	Phil Goff	Electorate	Mount Roskill	1	−15	✓ Won Mount Roskill	✗ Left parliament in 2016
17	Moana Mackey	List	East Coast	19	+2	✗ Lost seat	
18	Kelvin Davis	List	Te Tai Tokerau	23	+5	✓ Won Te Tai Tokerau	
19	Meka Whaitiri	Electorate	Ikaroa-Rāwhiti	—	—	✓ Won Ikaroa-Rāwhiti	
20	Megan Woods	Electorate	Wigram	47	+27	✓ Won Wigram	
21	Raymond Huo	List		21	0	✗ Lost seat	✓ Replaced Jacinda Ardern (in her role as list MP) in 2017
22	Damien O'Connor	Electorate	West Coast-Tasman	—	—	✓ Won West Coast-Tasman	
23	Priyanca Radhakrishnan			—	—		
24	Iain Lees-Galloway	Electorate	Palmerston North	37	+13	✓ Won Palmerston North	
25	Rachel Jones		Tauranga	—	—		
26	David Clark	Electorate	Dunedin North	49	+23	✓ Won Dunedin North	
27	Carol Beaumont	List	Maungakiekie	22	−5	✗ Lost seat	
28	Poto Williams	Electorate	Christchurch East	—	—	✓ Won Christchurch East	
29	Carmel Sepuloni	(Former MP)	Kelston	24	−5	✓ Won Kelston	
30	Tāmati Coffey		Rotorua	—	—		
31	Jenny Salesa		Manukau East	—	—	✓ Won Manukau East	
32	Liz Craig		Clutha-Southland	—	—		
33	Deborah Russell		Rangitīkei	—	—		
34	Willow-Jean Prime		Northland	—	—		
35	Jerome Mika		Papakura	36	+1		
36	Tony Milne		Christchurch Central	—	—		
37	Ginny Andersen		Ōhariu	—	—		
38	Claire Szabó		North Shore	—	—		
39	Michael Wood		Epsom	32	−7		✓ Replaced Phil Goff in the 2016 Mount Roskill by-election
40	Arena Williams		Hunua	—	—		
41	Hamish McDouall		Whanganui	52	+11		
42	Anjum Rahman			—	—		
43	Sunny Kaushal			—	—		
44	Christine Greer		Waikato	—	—		
45	Penny Gaylor		Taranaki-King Country	—	—		
46	Janette Walker		Kaikōura	—	—		
47	Richard Hills		Northcote	50	+3		
48	Shanan Halbert			—	—		
49	Anahila Kanongata'a-Suisuiki			51	+2		
50	Clare Wilson		Bay of Plenty	—	—		
51	James Dann		Ilam	—	—		
52	Kelly Ellis		Whangarei	—	—		
53	Corrie Haddock		Helensville	—	—		
54	Jamie Strange		Taupō	—	—		
55	Katie Paul			—	—		
56	Steven Gibson		Rangitata	—	—		
57	Chao-Fu Wu		Tāmaki	70	+13		
58	Paul Grimshaw			—	—		
59	Tracey Dorreen			—	—		
60	Tofik Mamedov		Botany	—	—		
61	Hikiera Toroa			—	—		
62	Hugh Tyler			—	—		
63	Susan Elliot			—	—		
64	Simon Buckingham			—	—		

=== Green Party ===
In March 2014, the Green Party released an "initial draft" of their party list, intended for internal party consultation and voting, which ranked forty-one candidates out of a larger candidate pool. A party list of thirty-nine people was revealed on 25 May. The twelfth-ranked candidate, incumbent MP Holly Walker, subsequently withdrew from the list for family reasons, causing other candidates to move up one place. The party's final list ranks fifty-nine people, with those not previously included being ranked alphabetically.

Rank	Name	Incumbency	Contesting electorate	Previous rank	Change	Initial results	Later changes
1	Metiria Turei	List	Dunedin North	1	0	✓ Elected from list	
2	Russel Norman	List	Rongotai	2	0	✓ Elected from list	✗ Left parliament in 2015
3	Kevin Hague	List	West Coast-Tasman	3	0	✓ Elected from list	✗ Left parliament in 2016
4	Eugenie Sage	List	Port Hills	6	+2	✓ Elected from list	
5	Gareth Hughes	List		7	+2	✓ Elected from list	
6	Catherine Delahunty	List	Coromandel	4	−2	✓ Elected from list	
7	Kennedy Graham	List	Helensville	5	−2	✓ Elected from list	
8	Julie Anne Genter	List	Epsom	13	+5	✓ Elected from list	
9	Mojo Mathers	List	Christchurch East	14	+5	✓ Elected from list	
10	Jan Logie	List	Mana	9	−1	✓ Elected from list	
11	David Clendon	List	Northland	8	−3	✓ Elected from list	
12	James Shaw		Wellington Central	15	+3	✓ Elected from list	
13	Denise Roche	List	Auckland Central	11	−2	✓ Elected from list	
14	Steffan Browning	List	Kaikōura	10	−4	✓ Elected from list	
15	Marama Davidson		Tāmaki Makaurau	—	—		✓ Replaced Russel Norman in 2015
16	Barry Coates		Mount Roskill	—	—		✓ Replaced Kevin Hague in 2016
17	John Hart		Wairarapa	—	—		
18	David Kennedy		Invercargill	23	+5		
19	Jeanette Elley		Mount Albert	19	0		
20	Jack McDonald		Te Tai Hauāuru	46	+26		
21	David Moorhouse		Christchurch Central	52	+31		
22	Sea Rotmann			20	−2		
23	Richard Leckinger		Maungakiekie	17	−6		
24	Umesh Perinpanayagam		Manukau East	—	—		
25	Susanne Ruthven		Rimutaka	—	—		
26	Teresa Moore		East Coast Bays	51	+25		
27	Dora Roimata Langsbury		Te Tai Tonga	22	−5		
28	Tane Woodley		Ōhariu	24	−4		
29	Chris Perley		Tukituki	—	—		
30	Rachel Goldsmith		Clutha-Southland	37	+7		
31	John Kelcher		Ilam	39	+8		
32	Daniel Rogers		New Lynn	—	—		
33	Richard Wesley		Wigram	61	+28		
34	Anne-Elise Smithson		Northcote	—	—		
35	Malcolm McAll		Rodney	—	—		
36	Chris Ford			—	—		
37	Reuben Hunt		Waimakariri	—	—		
38	Paul Bailey		Napier	31	−7		
39	Caroline Conroy		Papakura	34	−5		
40	Sue Coutts		Waitaki	35	−5		
41	Paul Doherty		Whangarei	—	—		
42	Maddy Drew		Ōtaki	—	—		
43	Shane Gallagher		Dunedin South	27	−16		
44	Peter Hill		Selwyn	—	—		
45	Ruth Irwin		Kelston	—	—		
46	Henare Kani		Ikaroa-Rāwhiti	—	—		
47	Gavin Maclean		East Coast	—	—		
48	Nicholas Mayne		Upper Harbour	—	—		
49	Ian McLean		Tauranga	47	−2		
50	Robert Moore		Taranaki-King Country	50	0		
51	Sarah Roberts		New Plymouth	—	—		
52	Colin Robertson		Nelson	—	—		
53	Dave Robinson		Taupō	—	—		
54	Mark Servian		Hamilton East	—	—		
55	Dorthe Siggaard		Tāmaki	—	—		
56	Brett Stansfield		North Shore	54	−2		
57	Gary Stewart		Te Atatū	56	−1		
58	Mua Strickson-Pua		Māngere	—	—		
59	Patricia Tupou		Manurewa	—	—		

=== New Zealand First ===
New Zealand First announced a party list of twenty-five people on 26 August. The party's final list ranks thirty-one people. A number of electorate selections were also announced, including one (Mere Takoko) who did have a list ranking. Sitting MP Andrew Williams was initially announced as an electorate candidate, but is no longer standing.

Rank	Name	Incumbency	Contesting electorate	Previous rank	Change	Initial results	Later changes
1	Winston Peters	List		1	0	✓ Elected from list	✓ Replaced Mike Sabin in the 2015 Northland by-election
2	Tracey Martin	List	Rodney	2	0	✓ Elected from list	
3	Richard Prosser	List	Waimakariri	4	+1	✓ Elected from list	
4	Fletcher Tabuteau		Rotorua	11	+7	✓ Elected from list	
5	Barbara Stewart	List	Waikato	5	0	✓ Elected from list	
6	Clayton Mitchell		Tauranga	—	—	✓ Elected from list	
7	Denis O'Rourke	List	Port Hills	7	0	✓ Elected from list	
8	Pita Paraone	(Former MP)	Whangarei	12	+4	✓ Elected from list	
9	Ron Mark	(Former MP)	Wairarapa	—	—	✓ Elected from list	
10	Darroch Ball		Palmerston North	—	—	✓ Elected from list	
11	Mahesh Bindra		Mount Roskill	21	+10	✓ Elected from list	
12	Ria Bond		Invercargill	—	—		✓ Replaced Winston Peters (in his role as list MP) in 2015
13	Mataroa Paroro		Hutt South	—	—		
14	Romuald Rudzki		Rangitīkei	—	—		
15	Jon Reeves		Hunua	—	—		
16	Asenati Taylor	List	Manukau East	8	−8	✗ Lost seat	
17	Brent Catchpole	(Former MP)	Papakura	13	−4		
18	George Abraham		Christchurch Central	—	—		
19	Ray Dolman		Bay of Plenty	—	—		
20	Hugh Barr		Wellington Central	10	−10		
21	Anne Degia-Pala		Kelston	—	—		
22	Steve Campbell		Kaikōura	—	—		
23	Edwin Perry	(Former MP)	Taupō	22	−1		
24	Bill Gudgeon	(Former MP)	Hamilton West	16	−8		
25	Brent Pierson		Rongotai	27	+2		
26	Aaron Hunt		Rimutaka	—	—		
27	John Hall		Manurewa	—	—		
28	Richard Taurima			—	—		
29	Grant Ertel		Coromandel	—	—		
30	Cliff Lyon			—	—		
31	Bill Woods		Selwyn	—	—		

=== Māori Party ===
The Māori Party announced a list of twenty-four people on 25 August. In addition, there is one announced electorate candidate (Susan Cullen) who is not on the list.

Rank	Name	Incumbency	Contesting electorate	Previous rank	Change	Initial results	Later changes
1	Te Ururoa Flavell	Electorate	Waiariki	9	+8	✓ Won Waiariki	
2	Marama Fox		Ikaroa-Rāwhiti	—	—	✓ Elected from list	
3	Chris McKenzie		Te Tai Hauāuru	—	—		
4	Te Hira Paenga		Te Tai Tokerau	—	—		
5	Ngaire Button		Te Tai Tonga	—	—		
6	Nancy Tuaine		Whanganui	—	—		
7	Tame Iti			—	—		
8	Eraia Kiel			—	—		
9	Anaru Kaipo		Whangarei	—	—		
10	Raewyn Bhana		Manurewa	—	—		
11	Rangimarie Naida Glavish			—	—		
12	Aroha Reriti-Crofts		Waimakariri	—	—		
13	Hinurewa Te Hau		Upper Harbour	—	—		
14	Tom Phillips		Hunua	14	0		
15	Verna Ohia-Gate		Tauranga	—	—		
16	Ann Kendall		Papakura	—	—		
17	Hiria Pakinga		Coromandel	—	—		
18	Claire Winitana		Taupō	—	—		
19	Ra Smith		Wairarapa	—	—		
20	Lenis Davidson		Christchurch Central	—	—		
21	Tania Mataki		Christchurch East	—	—		
22	Sheryl Gardyne		Selwyn	—	—		
23	Te Whe Ariki Phillips		Wigram	—	—		
24	Benita Wakefield		Ilam	—	—		

=== Internet MANA ===
The Mana Movement and the Internet Party announced prior to the election that they would contest the election with a joint party list. The top six places on the combined list were specifically assigned to one of the two parties (Mana takes the first, third and fourth; the Internet Party takes the second, fifth, and sixth), while the remaining places will alternate between the two as far as thirty. The Internet Party announced a list of fifteen candidates (to be integrated into the joint list) on 19 June. The Mana Party announced its own list selections on 18 August, and has also named one electorate candidate (Georgina Beyer) who will not have a list ranking.

Rank	Name	Component Party	Incumbency	Contesting electorate	Previous rank	Change	Initial results	Later changes
1	Hone Harawira	Mana	Electorate	Te Tai Tokerau	1	0	✗ Lost seat	
2	Laila Harré	Internet	(Former MP)	Helensville	—	—		
3	Annette Sykes	Mana		Waiariki	2	−1		
4	John Minto	Mana		Mount Roskill	3	−1		
5	Chris Yong	Internet		Te Atatū	—	—		
6	Miriam Pierard	Internet		Auckland Central	—	—		
7	Te Hāmua Nikora	Mana		Ikaroa-Rāwhiti	—	—		
8	David Currin	Internet		Whangarei	—	—		
9	James Papali'i	Mana		Māngere	6	−3		
10	Beverley Ballantine	Internet		Ilam	—	—		
11	Angeline Greensill	Mana		Hauraki-Waikato	8	−3		
12	Gil Ho	Internet		Northcote	—	—		
13	Pat O'Dea	Mana		Epsom	15	+2		
14	Pani Farvid	Internet		Palmerston North	—	—		
15	Makelisi Ngata	Mana		Upper Harbour	—	—		
16	Patrick Salmon	Internet		East Coast	—	—		
17	Tangi Tipene	Mana			—	—		
18	Roshni Sami	Internet		Kelston	—	—		
19	Joe Carolan	Mana		Mount Albert	—	—		
20	Callum Valentine	Internet		Wellington Central	—	—		
21	Sitaleki Finau	Mana		Maungakiekie	—	—		
22	Grant Keinzley	Internet		Taranaki-King Country	—	—		
23	Joe Trinder	Mana		Manukau East	—	—		
24	Lois McClintock	Internet		Wigram	—	—		
25	Ariana Paretutanganui-Tamati	Mana		Rongotai	—	—		
26	Robert Stewart	Internet		Dunedin North	—	—		
27	Lisa Gibson	Mana		Tāmaki	—	—		
28	Raymond Calver	Internet		Hamilton East	—	—		
29	Heleyni Pratley	Mana			—	—		
30	Andrew LePine	Internet		Dunedin South	—	—		
31	Roger Fowler	Mana		Papakura	—	—		
32	Yvonne Dainty	Mana		Manurewa	—	—		

=== ACT ===
ACT New Zealand announced a twenty-person list on 13 July, and released a modified version (with Max Whitehead omitted and Tim Kronfeld added to the end) in mid-August. The party's final list ranks forty-one people, with those not previously included being ranked in alphabetical order.

Rank	Name	Incumbency	Contesting electorate	Previous rank	Change	Initial results	Later changes
1	Jamie Whyte		Pakuranga	—	—		
2	Kenneth Wang	(Former MP)		—	—		
3	Robin Grieve		Whangarei	14	+11		
4	Beth Houlbrooke		Rodney	38	+34		
5	Don Nicolson		Clutha-Southland	3	−2		
6	Stephen Berry		Upper Harbour	—	—		
7	Dasha Kovalenko		Auckland Central	—	—		
8	Gareth Veale		Ilam	—	—		
9	Ian Cummings		Hunua	19	+10		
10	Sara Muti		Hamilton West	—	—		
11	Toni Severin		Christchurch Central	17	+6		
12	Phelan Pirrie		Helensville	—	—		
13	Stephen Fletcher		Te Atatū	—	—		
14	David Olsen		Coromandel	—	—		
15	Nick Kearney		North Shore	41	+26		
16	Sean Fitzpatrick		Ōhariu	(Libertarianz: 2)	−14		
17	Richard Evans		Kaikōura	—	—		
18	Michael Milne		Tāmaki	—	—		
19	Ron Smith		Hamilton East	—	—		
20	Tim Kronfeld		Northcote	—	—		
21	Shane Atkinson		Wairarapa	—	—		
22	Mike Burrow		Waikato	—	—		
23	Bruce Carley			—	—		
24	Tom Corbett		Rangitata	33	+9		
25	Alan Davidson		Whanganui	36	+11		
26	Tommy Fergusson		Mount Albert	—	—		
27	Paul Gilbert		Selwyn	—	—		
28	Lucy Gray (Note: Then known as James Gray.)		New Plymouth	—	—		
29	Shaun Grieve		Wigram	—	—		
30	Bruce Haycock		Kelston	—	—		
31	Paul Hufflett		Nelson	39	+8		
32	Peter Juang			—	—		
33	Duncan Lennox		Tukituki	—	—		
34	Kath McCabe			8	−26		
35	Craig Nelson		Northland	—	—		
36	Colin Nichols			47	+11		
37	Grae O'Sullivan		Hutt South	—	—		
38	Joanne Reeder			—	—		
39	Geoff Russell		Port Hills	—	—		
40	John Thompson		Papakura	—	—		
41	Neil Wilson		Rangitikei	—	—		

=== United Future ===
United Future announced its top ten list candidates (after the party leader) on 3 August 2014. Its final list is slightly modified, with the omission of Ram Parkash (originally ranked ninth) and the addition of Sam Park (eleventh). The party has also announced a number of electorate candidates.

Rank	Name	Incumbency	Contesting electorate	Previous rank	Change	Initial results	Later changes
1	Peter Dunne	Electorate	Ōhariu	1	0	✓ Won Ōhariu	
2	Alan Simmons		Taupō	5	+3		
3	Damian Light		Northcote	12	+9		
4	Sultan Eusoff		Rongotai	4	0		
5	Ben Rickard		Bay of Plenty	—	—		
6	Jason Woolston		Kelston	—	—		
7	Dave Stonyer		Hutt South	—	—		
8	Bryan Mockridge		Maungakiekie	6	−2		
9	Quentin Todd		Hamilton East	—	—		
10	James Maxwell		Tauranga	—	—		
11	Sam Park		Christchurch East	—	—		

== Other registered parties ==
=== Conservative Party ===
The Conservative Party released a full list of candidates for both the Party and electorate voted. It announced its top five list rankings on 22 August, and then announced a list of twenty people on 26 August.

Rank	Name	Incumbency	Contesting electorate	Previous rank	Change	Initial results	Later changes
1	Colin Craig		East Coast Bays	1	0		
2	Christine Rankin		Epsom	—	—		
3	Garth McVicar		Napier	—	—		
4	Melissa Perkin		North Shore	—	—		
5	Edward Saafi		Māngere	—	—		
6	Callum Blair		Upper Harbour	—	—		
7	Mel Taylor		Northland	23	+16		
8	Steve Taylor		New Lynn	—	—		
9	Roy Brown		Rangitīkei	6	−3		
10	Paul Young		Botany	11	+1		
11	Donald Aubrey		Waitaki	—	—		
12	Brian Dobbs		Waikato	5	−7		
13	John Stringer		Ilam	—	—		
14	Anton Heyns		Rodney	—	—		
15	Michael Brunner		Ōhariu	—	—		
16	Brent Reid		Wairarapa	29	+13		
17	Deborah Cunliffe		Bay of Plenty	—	—		
18	Philip Lynch			—	—		
19	Howard Hudson		Kaikōura	—	—		
20	Elliot Ikilei		Manurewa	—	—		

=== Legalise Cannabis Party ===
The Aotearoa Legalise Cannabis Party announced its first ten list rankings on 10 August, and later announced a slightly modified list of thirteen people on 20 August. Three candidates who had previously been announced (Paula Lambert in Christchurch Central, David Kent in Rongotai, and Richard Neutgens in Auckland Central) were not on the party's final candidates list.

Rank	Name	Incumbency	Contesting electorate	Previous rank	Change	Initial results	Later changes
1	Julian Crawford		Dunedin South	4	+3		
2	Abe Gray		Dunedin North	18	+16		
3	Emma-Jane Kingi		Te Tai Tonga	7	+4		
4	Alistair Gregory		Wellington Central	—	—		
5	Jeffrey Lye		Kelston	5	0		
6	Richard Goode		Mana	9	+3		
7	Romana Manning		Tukituki	13	+6		
8	Rob Wilkinson		Christchurch Central	—	—		
9	Jamie Dombroski		New Plymouth	15	+6		
10	Sandy Mulqueen			—	—		
11	Adrian McDermott		Te Atatū	20	+9		
12	Ant Heath			—	—		
13	Paul McMullan			28	+15		

=== Democrats for Social Credit ===
The New Zealand Democratic Party for Social Credit released a party and electorate candidates list. Its final list ranks thirty-five people.

Rank	Name	Incumbency	Contesting electorate	Previous rank	Change	Initial results	Later changes
1	Stephnie de Ruyter		Invercargill	1	0		
2	Chris Leitch		Whangarei	—	—		
3	John Pemberton		Taupō	2	−1		
4	Katherine Ransom		Waikato	4	0		
5	Warren Voight		Dunedin South	3	−2		
6	Alida Steemson		Ōhariu	—	—		
7	Hessel van Wieren		Waitaki	6	−1		
8	Andrew Leitch		New Lynn	—	—		
9	Jason Jobsis		Clutha-Southland	—	—		
10	James Knuckey		Wellington Central	—	—		
11	Carolyn McKenzie		Hamilton East	5	−6		
12	Robin Columbus		Christchurch Central	—	—		
13	Dick Ryan		Tukituki	—	—		
14	Harry Alchin-Smith		East Coast	15	+1		
15	Mischele Rhodes		Hamilton West	—	—		
16	Hahona Rakiri Tamati		Te Tai Tonga	—	—		
17	Barry Pulford		Napier	9	−8		
18	Peter Adcock-White		Waimakariri	17	−1		
19	Tracy Livingston		Bay of Plenty	—	—		
20	David Wilson		Northland	—	—		
21	Huia Mitchell		Hunua	11	−10		
22	John McCaskey		Kaikōura	10	−12		
23	John Ring		Wigram	18	−5		
24	Miriam Mowat		Dunedin North	—	—		
25	David Espin		Taranaki-King Country	20	−5		
26	Heather Marion Smith		Whanganui	7	−19		
27	Gary Gribben		Port Hills	22	−5		
28	Adrian Bayly		Nelson	—	—		
29	Tim Leitch		North Shore	—	—		
30	Ron England		Mana	23	−7		
31	Kelly Balsom			19	−12		
32	Errol Baird			16	−16		
33	Karl Hewlett			—	—		
34	Kerry Balsom			—	—		
35	Robert Richards			—	—		

=== Focus New Zealand ===
Focus New Zealand's party list consisted of eight people. It has announced electorate candidates.

Rank	Name	Incumbency	Contesting electorate	Previous rank	Change	Initial results	Later changes
1	Ken Rintoul		Northland	—	—		
2	Les King		Whangarei	—	—		
3	Terry Oakley			—	—		
4	John Vujcich			—	—		
5	Hayden Flintoff			—	—		
6	Ranjit Singh			—	—		
7	Julian Fairlie			—	—		
8	Christie Gordon			—	—		

=== 1Law4All Party ===
A post to the 1Law4All Party's Facebook page indicated that the party will not be standing any candidates in the 2014 election. According to the message, the resignation of four out of five board members ("a deliberate act of sabotage") prevents the party from approving a candidate list before the official deadline, no candidates for the party ended up being submitted prior to the closure of nominations.

=== Independent Coalition ===
The NZ Independent Coalition announced a party list of ten people on 19 August 2014.

Rank	Name	Incumbency	Contesting electorate	Previous rank	Change	Initial results	Later changes
1	Brendan Horan	List	Bay of Plenty	(NZ First: 6)	+5	✗ Lost seat	
2	Michael O'Neill		Tauranga	—	—		
3	Pat Spellman		Waiariki	—	—		
4	Joanne Rye-McGregor			—	—		
5	Jack Keogh			—	—		
6	Barjindar Singh			—	—		
7	Karl Barkley		Clutha-Southland	—	—		
8	Wal Gordon			—	—		
9	Rick Pollock			—	—		
10	Giovanni Mollo			—	—		

=== Ban 1080 ===
The Ban 1080 Party released a list of nine people on 19 August 2014. Its final list reversed the two final candidates.

Rank	Name	Incumbency	Contesting electorate	Initial results	Later changes
1	Mike Downard		Coromandel		
2	Bill Wallace				
3	Peter Salter		West Coast-Tasman		
4	James Veint		Clutha-Southland		
5	Glen Tomlinson		Kaikōura		
6	Patricia Cheel		East Coast Bays		
7	Mike McClunie				
8	John Burrill				
9	Andy Blick				

=== Civilian Party ===
The Civilian Party's list ranked eight people.

Rank	Name	Incumbency	Contesting electorate	Initial results	Later changes
1	Ben Uffindell				
2	Lucy-Jane Walsh				
3	Marcus Gower				
4	Michael Topp				
5	Katie O'Neill				
6	Harry Berger				
7	Tim McLeod				
8	Kim Downing				
