= 2022 Auckland mayoral election =

New Zealand mayoral election

- 8 October 2022
- Turnout: 404,541 (35.41% ▼0.05 pp)
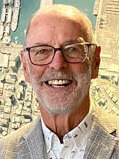

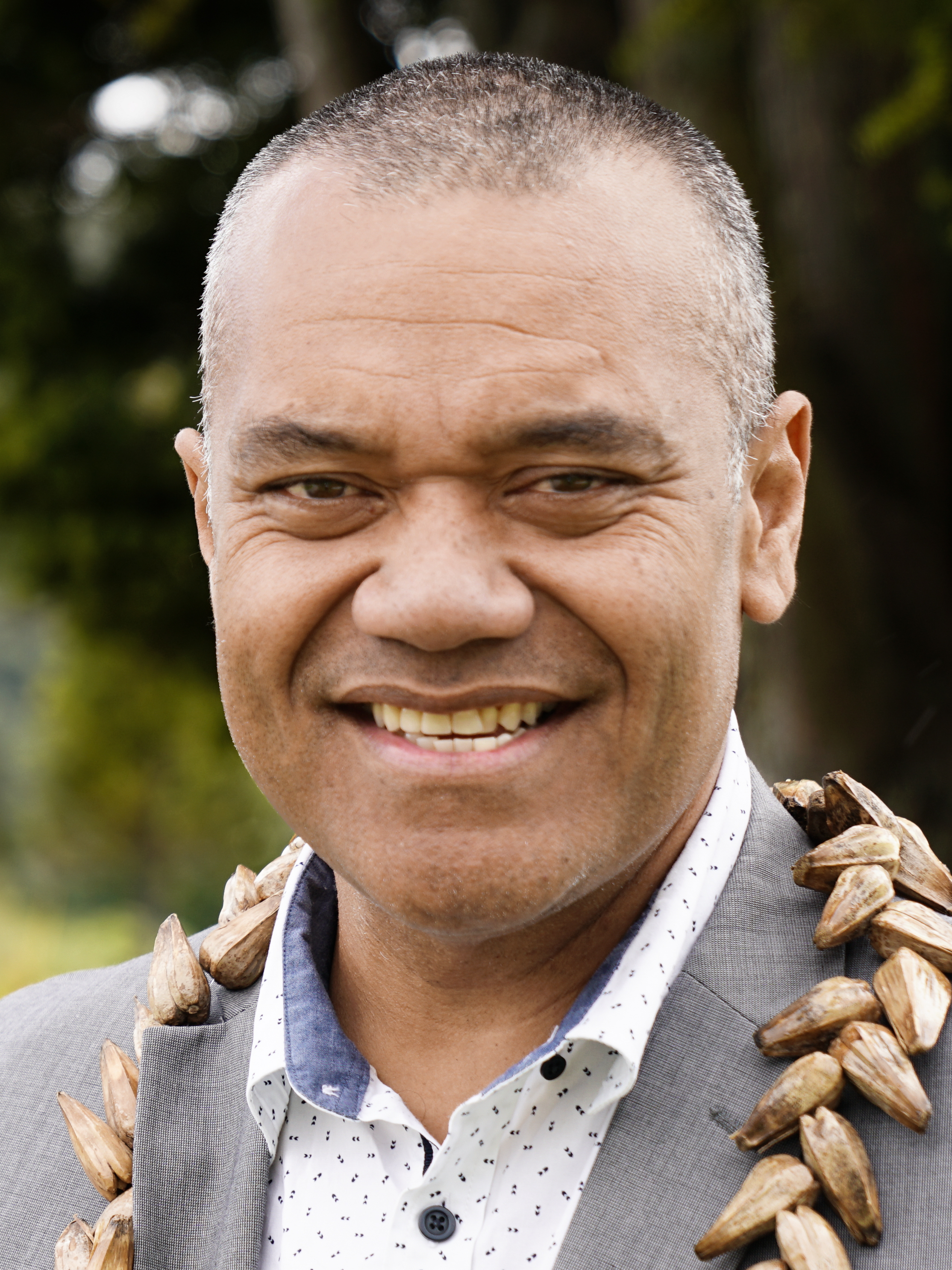
| | | | Ind |
| Candidate | Wayne Brown | Efeso Collins | Craig Lord |
| Party | Independent | Independent | Independent |
| Popular vote | 181,810 | 124,802 | 25,021 |
| Percentage | 44.94% | 30.85% | 6.19% |
- Margin of victory in local board subdivisions
Mayor before election
Phil Goff
Independent Labour
Elected mayor
Wayne Brown
Independent

The 2022 Auckland mayoral election was held on 8 October 2022 to determine the Mayor of Auckland, as part of the 2022 New Zealand local elections. The incumbent mayor since 2016, Phil Goff, did not seek re-election. Campaign issues include transport strategy, council finance issues and the Three Waters reform programme. After provisional vote counts were released on 8 October, Wayne Brown declared victory, and Efeso Collins conceded the election.

== Key dates ==
Key dates for the 2022 elections in Auckland:

| 15 July | Candidate nominations opened |
| 12 August | Candidate nominations closed at noon |
| 17 August | Official declaration of nominated candidates |
| 12 September | Final electoral roll certified by Electoral Officer |
| 16–21 September | Voting papers were sent to voters |
| 16 September–8 October | Voting was open |
| 8 October | Election day – voting closed at noon |
| 8 October | Progress results released |
| 10 October | Preliminary results released |
| 15 October | Final results released |

== Campaign ==
=== Labour and Green endorsements of Collins ===
In elections from 2010 to 2016, mayoral candidates Len Brown and Phil Goff ran as independents and were supported by City Vision, an Auckland group affiliated to the national Labour and Green parties. In 2019, Goff was endorsed directly by Labour. Goff, the incumbent mayor, stated he would announce his intentions on running for a third term in February 2022. Efeso Collins and Richard Hills, Auckland councillors affiliated with Labour, were both reported to be exploring mayoral candidacies while awaiting Goff's decision, in order to avoid crowding the ballot. Frustrated with Goff's timeline in light of an approaching election campaign, Collins formally announced his candidacy on 26 January. On 10 February, Hills announced he would decline to run for mayor, citing the recent birth of his son. Labour announced a process to decide the party's endorsee on 15 February; the process was uncontested, and on 28 February, Labour endorsed Collins' independent campaign. On 15 March, the Green Party announced their endorsement of Collins. This was the first time that the party endorsed a mayoral candidate in Auckland.

=== National and C&R endorsements ===
Molloy claimed on 17 June 2022 while on The AM Show that the National Party had offered to endorse his mayoral campaign, adding that Beck should leave the race. When asked who specifically he had been talking to, Molloy did not identify any individuals, replying "everybody". A spokesperson for National leader Christopher Luxon stated they weren't sure who Molloy was referring to and that they had not endorsed him. The National Party-aligned Communities and Residents local body group endorsed Viv Beck on 12 July 2022.

=== Debates ===
The Penrose Business Association hosted a debate between seven candidates on 23 June. A debate hosted by the Takapuna Beach Business Association on 6 July saw seven candidates discuss issues such as climate change and the possibility of a second harbour crossing. On 20 July, Shane Te Pou moderated a debate at Ngā Whare Waatea in Māngere for Radio Waatea between four candidates.

Six candidates attended a University of Auckland Debating Society on 26 July moderated by Jack Tame, during which Ted Johnston was egged after unknowingly referring to an audience member with Tourette syndrome as "team Efeso" (in reference to Efeso Collins), for which he later apologised. Wayne Brown was absent due to the debate conflicting with a campaign fundraising dinner.

| Date | Organiser(s) | Moderator(s) | Participants | | | | | | |
| Date | Organiser(s) | Moderator(s) | Beck Independent | G. Brown Independent | W. Brown Independent | Collins Independent | Johnston New Conservative | Lord Independent | Molloy Independent |
|---|---|---|---|---|---|---|---|---|---|
| 23 June | Penrose Business Association | —N/a | Present | Present | Present | Present | Present | Present | Present |
| 6 July | Takapuna Beach Business Association | —N/a | Present | Present | Present | Present | Present | Present | Present |
| 20 July | Radio Waatea | Shane Te Pou | Present | Absent | Absent | Present | Absent | Present | Present |
| 26 July | University of Auckland Debating Society | Jack Tame | Present | Present | Absent | Present | Present | Present | Present |

=== Campaign issues ===
==== Transport ====
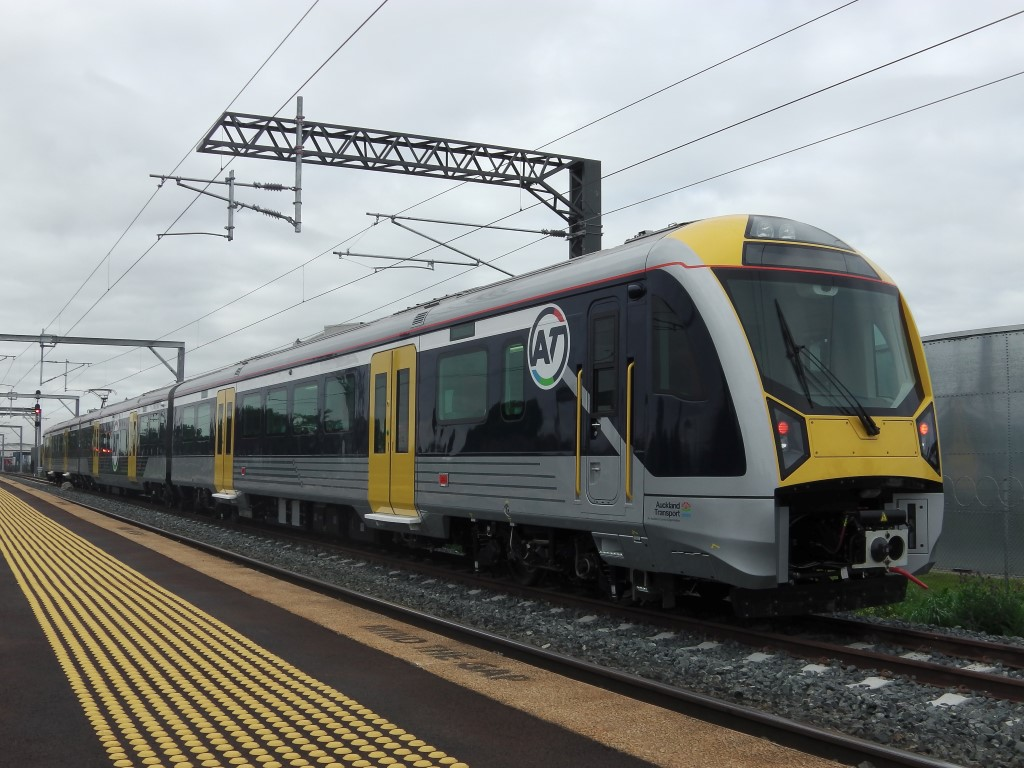
Efeso Collins has proposed making public transport in Auckland fare-free.

Collins' flagship policy was free public transport, which was estimated to cost $100–$250 million annually. He pointed out that some Auckland residents spend 30% of their income on transport, and that free public transport was "the first and best way" to reduce Auckland's greenhouse gas emissions.

Brown did not announce a transport strategy. Instead, he said he would "get rid of the road cones" and "make sure all the existing projects are finished before new ones are started".

Law supported better alternatives to cars, and specifically the expansion of the rail network. Lord also opposed the light rail project, and wanted to lobby the central Government to spend the funds in more critical regions such as passenger rail to Kumeu, and wanted to put overhead transport options on the table.

Molloy supported a one-year trial of free public transport, funded through the existing regional fuel tax revenue. Molloy described himself as pro-private car and was in favour of a congestion charge of $3.50. Molloy was not interested in encouraging more cycling. He opposed the proposed light rail project and claimed it "will never happen in my lifetime".

Beck did not support universal fare-free public transport, but supported targeted concessions.

==== Council finances ====
Collins was open to discussions around rebalancing the proportions of council income coming from rates, dividends from public assets and central government contributions, and was "proud" that rates only make up half of Auckland's revenue, but was not ruling out rates increases. He opposed the sale of strategic assets, including shares in Auckland Airport.

Lord pledged to focus on providing core services, promising to be "focused on necessities over niceties", and was adamant that the council could be a much more streamlined and efficient entity.

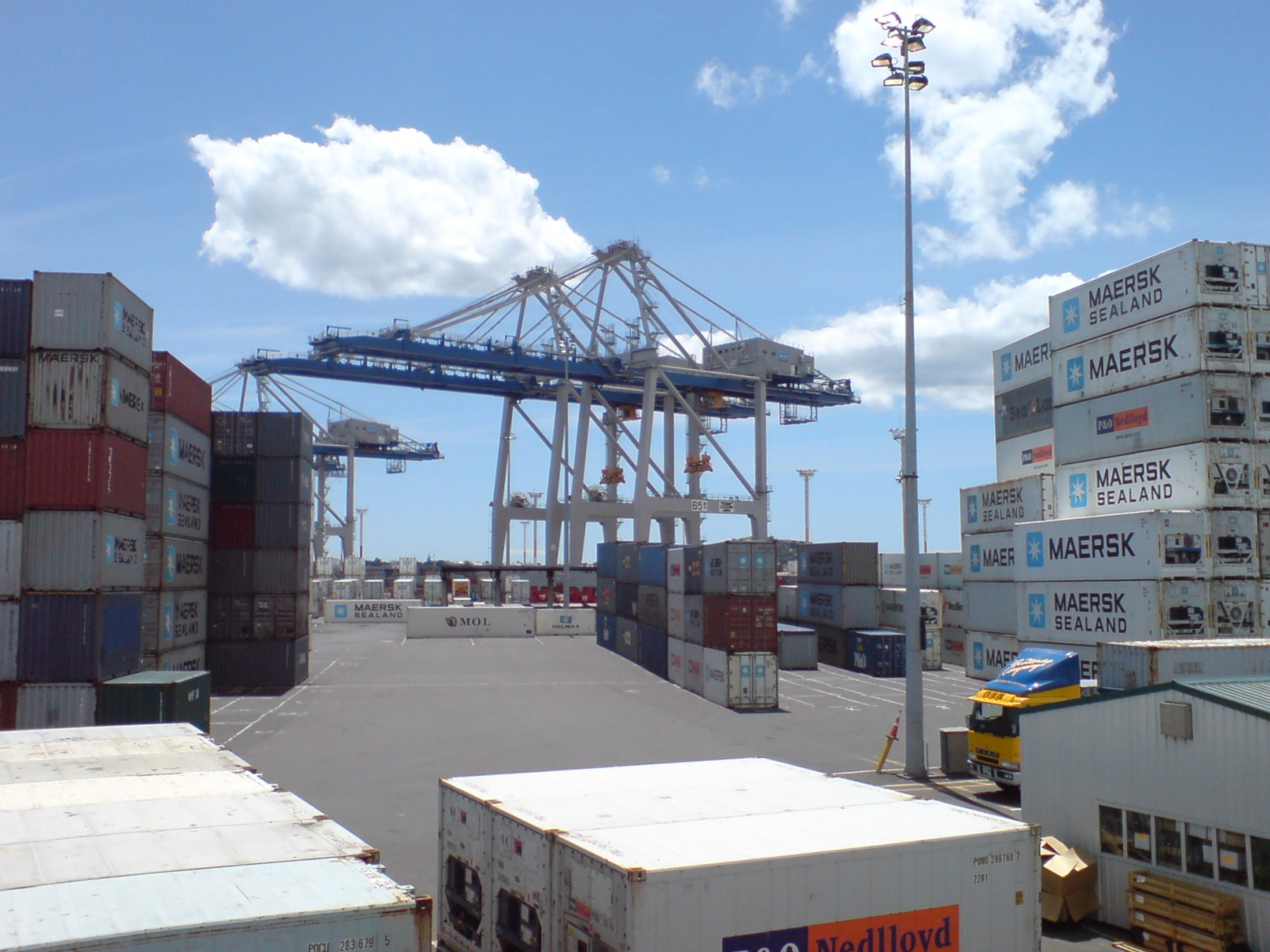
Leo Molloy suggested the Ports of Auckland be privatised.

Molloy stated that the $1 billion annual spending on wages for council employees needed to be reduced, and proposed removing the middle layer of council administration. He planned to limit rates rises to the rate of inflation of council expenses. He proposed selling Ports of Auckland and the leasehold estate of the land they operate on, which he claimed would raise $7 billion and $10 billion, respectively, and was open to selling shares in Auckland Airport and Eke Panuku, the council-controlled organisation responsible for urban redevelopment. Beck saw future rates rises as "difficult", and supported the sale and movement of the central port.

==== Water reform ====
The government was proposing a Three Waters reform programme to centralise water management infrastructure between territorial authorities. Collins supported the reforms, but noted that Auckland had invested significantly into Watercare Services and had issues around the details of the future governance of assets should the reforms proceed. Brown, Lord and Johnston opposed the reforms, with Brown calling the proposed co-governance model for water management "a dumb idea".

==== Co-governance ====
Co-governance is a power-sharing arrangement between iwi and elected representatives. Collins fully supported co-governance. Wayne Brown believed it was acceptable in certain cases, such as the Whanganui River and where iwi have a long and strong interest in matters like the maunga (volcanoes). Lord opposed co-governance completely.

== List of candidates ==
| Candidate | Photo | Affiliation | Background |
|---|---|---|---|
| John Alcock | | None | |
| Viv Beck | | Independent | Chief executive of Heart of the City; Endorsed by Communities and Residents; Unofficially withdrew on 16 September 2022; officially remained a candidate |
| Gary Brown | | Independent | Hibiscus and Bays Community Board chairman |
| Wayne Brown | | Fix Auckland | Businessman; Developer; Former Mayor of Far North; Former Chairperson of Tairāwhiti District Health Board and Northland District Health Board |
| Tricia Cheel | | STOP Trashing Our Planet | |
| Efeso Collins | | Independent | Auckland councillor Endorsed by Labour and the Greens |
| Micahel Coote | | Independent | |
| Tony Corbett | | Independent | Founder of New Zealand Sovereignty Party; Candidate for the 2022 Tauranga by-election Businessman |
| James Malcolm Dunphy | | None | |
| David John Feist | | None | |
| Alezix Heneti | | Independent | |
| Robert Hong Hu | | Independent | Lawyer; Notary; Soccer player |
| Ted Johnston | | New Conservative Party | 2019 mayoral candidate Lawyer; Co-leader of the New Conservatives |
| Michael Kampkes | | Independent | Founder of Citizens Against The Housing Act 2021 |
| John Lehmann | | Independent | |
| Lisa Lewis | | NZ Voice | Adult entertainer |
| Craig Lord | | Independent | 2019 mayoral candidate |
| Pete Mazany | | Independent | |
| Michael Morris | | Animal Justice Auckland | Animal rights advocate Research scientist |
| Phil O'Connor | | Christians Against Abortion | |
| John Palino | | None | Former restaurateur 2013 and 2016 mayoral candidate |
| Ryan Earl Pausina | | None | |
| Dani Riekwel | | None | |

=== Withdrawn candidates ===
- Leo Molloy, businessman, withdrew on 12 August 2022
- Jake Law, teacher and model. Standing for Albany ward and Hibiscus and Bays Local Board in council elections instead.
- Viv Beck, withdrew unofficially on 16 September 2022, and officially remained a candidate.

=== Declined to be candidates ===
- Paula Bennett, former National MP
- Phil Goff, incumbent mayor
- Richard Hills, Auckland councillor
- Nikki Kaye, former National MP
- Mark Mitchell, National MP
- David Shearer, former Labour MP
- Maurice Williamson, former National MP

== Opinion polling ==
Unknown and undecided voters are excluded from these counts but may represent a large proportion of the voters e.g. 33-43% in two September polls.

| Date (Note: These are the survey dates of the poll, or if the survey dates are not stated, the date the poll was released.) | Polling organisation | Viv Beck | Gary Brown | Wayne Brown | Efeso Collins | Ted Johnston | John Lehmann | Craig Lord | Leo Molloy | Michael Morris |
| Date | Polling organisation | Independent | Independent | Fix Auckland | Independent | New Conservative | Independent | Independent | Independent | Animal Justice |
|---|---|---|---|---|---|---|---|---|---|---|
| 16–20 September 2022 | 1 News–Kantar Public | 8 | 5 | 35 | 29 | 1 | <0.5 | 8 | — | 1 |
| 11–18 September 2022 | Ratepayers' Alliance–Curia | 10 | 3 | 28 | 26 | 4 | — | 8 | — | — |
| 16 September 2022 | Viv Beck withdrew from election | | | | | | | | | |
| 15 September 2022 | Talbot Mills (Note: Poll commissioned by Efeso Collins) | 12 | — | 22 | 27 | — | — | 9 | — | — |
| 8–15 September 2022 | 1 News–Kantar Public | 14 | 4 | 24 | 29 | 1 | <0.5 | 10 | — | 1 |
| 12 August 2022 | Leo Molloy withdrew from election | | | | | | | | | |
| 3–11 August 2022 | Ratepayers' Alliance–Curia | 12.5 | 6.2 | 18.6 | 22.3 | 6.4 | 4 | 7.2 | 14.5 | 3.1 |
| 18–24 July 2022 | Key Research (Note: Poll commissioned by Wayne Brown) | 19 | – | 21 | 28 | – | – | 8 | 23 | – |
| 3–10 July 2022 | Ratepayers' Alliance–Curia | 18 | – | 15 | 27 | 5 | – | 13 | 23 | – |
| 1–12 June 2022 | Ratepayers' Alliance–Curia | 20.5 | – | 20.1 | 21.7 | – | – | 16.0 | 21.7 | – |

== Results ==
Wayne Brown defeated Efeso Collins.

2022 Auckland mayoral election
| Party | Candidate | Votes | % | ±% |
|---|---|---|---|---|
| Independent | Wayne Brown | 181,810 | 44.94 | (new) |
| Independent Labour/Independent Green | Efeso Collins | 124,802 | 30.85 | (new) |
| Independent | Craig Lord | 25,021 | 6.19 | (new) |
| Independent | Robert Hong Hu | 8,718 | 2.16 | (new) |
| Independent | Gary Brown | 8,683 | 2.15 | (new) |
| Independent | Viv Beck | 7,101 | 1.76 | (new) |
| Independent | Tony Corbett | 5,479 | 1.35 | (new) |
| Independent | John Alcock | 5,262 | 1.30 | (new) |
| New Conservatives | Ted Johnston | 4,841 | 1.20 | −2.97 |
| Independent | Michael Coote | 4,015 | 0.99 | −0.51 |
| Independent | Pete Mazany | 3,690 | 0.91 | (new) |
| Independent | Tricia Cheel | 3,029 | 0.75 | −0.35 |
| Independent | Phil O'Connor | 2,526 | 0.62 | −0.44 |
| Animal Justice | Michael Morris | 2,183 | 0.54 | (new) |
| Independent | John Palino | 2,144 | 0.53 | (new) |
| Independent | Lisa Lewis | 2,122 | 0.52 | (new) |
| Independent | Michael Kampkes | 1,899 | 0.47 | (new) |
| Independent | Dani Riekwel | 1,708 | 0.42 | (new) |
| Independent | John Lehmann | 1,068 | 0.26 | (new) |
| Independent | David John Feist | 1,006 | 0.25 | −0.36 |
| Independent | Alezix Heneti | 924 | 0.23 | +0.09 |
| Independent | Ryan Earl Pausina | 526 | 0.13 | (new) |
| Independent | James Malcolm Dunphy | 460 | 0.11 | (new) |
| Informal votes | | 784 | 0.19 | −0.23 |
| Blank votes | | 4,740 | 1.17 | −0.74 |
| Turnout | | 404,541 | 35.17 | −0.05 |
| Registered electors | | 1,150,225 | | |
| Independent gain from Independent | | | | |

=== By local board ===
Local board subdivisions won by Brown
Local board subdivisions won by Collins

| | | Wayne Brown | | Efeso Collins | | Craig Lord | | Others (Note: Excludes informal votes) | | Total |
| Board | Subdivision (Note: Not all local boards are subdivided) | # | % | # | % | # | % | # | % | # |
|---|---|---|---|---|---|---|---|---|---|---|
| Aotea Great Barrier | —N/a | 135 | 30.41 | 180 | 40.54 | 14 | 3.15 | 115 | 25.90 | 444 |
| Albert-Eden | Maungawhau | 6,950 | 48.64 | 5,439 | 38.07 | 425 | 2.97 | 1,474 | 10.32 | 14,288 |
| Albert-Eden | Owairaka | 4,922 | 36.09 | 6,852 | 50.24 | 492 | 3.61 | 1,372 | 10.06 | 13,638 |
| Devonport-Takapuna | —N/a | 10,258 | 54.96 | 5,045 | 27.03 | 756 | 4.05 | 2,605 | 13.96 | 18,664 |
| Franklin | Pukekohe | 5,731 | 53.26 | 1,841 | 17.11 | 1,340 | 12.45 | 1,849 | 17.18 | 10,761 |
| Franklin | Wairoa | 5,082 | 60.28 | 1,410 | 16.73 | 898 | 10.65 | 1,040 | 12.34 | 8,430 |
| Franklin | Waiuku | 2,234 | 46.67 | 880 | 18.38 | 761 | 15.90 | 912 | 19.05 | 4,787 |
| Henderson-Massey | —N/a | 8,379 | 35.05 | 8,403 | 35.15 | 1,801 | 7.53 | 5,325 | 22.27 | 23,908 |
| Hibiscus and Bays | East Coast Bays | 8,414 | 57.08 | 2,901 | 19.68 | 993 | 6.74 | 2,434 | 16.51 | 14,742 |
| Hibiscus and Bays | Hibiscus Coast | 10,371 | 55.06 | 3,256 | 17.29 | 1,403 | 7.45 | 3,805 | 20.20 | 18,835 |
| Howick | Botany | 6,573 | 50.52 | 2,331 | 17.92 | 594 | 4.57 | 3,512 | 26.99 | 13,010 |
| Howick | Howick | 7,505 | 57.58 | 2,261 | 17.35 | 834 | 6.40 | 2,435 | 18.68 | 13,035 |
| Howick | Pakuranga | 6,298 | 56.14 | 2,017 | 17.98 | 796 | 7.10 | 2,108 | 18.79 | 11,219 |
| Kaipātiki | —N/a | 9,429 | 43.85 | 6,983 | 32.47 | 1,177 | 5.47 | 3,914 | 18.20 | 21,503 |
| Māngere-Ōtāhuhu | —N/a | 2,528 | 18.97 | 7,571 | 56.81 | 438 | 3.29 | 2,789 | 20.93 | 13,326 |
| Manurewa | —N/a | 4,608 | 29.09 | 7,047 | 44.48 | 661 | 4.17 | 3,526 | 22.26 | 15,842 |
| Maungakiekie-Tāmaki | Maungakiekie | 3,112 | 40.27 | 3,138 | 40.61 | 301 | 3.89 | 1,177 | 15.23 | 7,728 |
| Maungakiekie-Tāmaki | Tāmaki | 3,125 | 34.73 | 3,510 | 39.01 | 376 | 4.18 | 1,987 | 22.08 | 8,998 |
| Ōrākei | —N/a | 19,080 | 64.30 | 6,855 | 23.10 | 1,041 | 3.51 | 2,697 | 9.09 | 29,673 |
| Ōtara-Papatoetoe | Ōtara | 473 | 9.38 | 3,469 | 68.80 | 72 | 1.43 | 1,028 | 20.39 | 5,042 |
| Ōtara-Papatoetoe | Papatoetoe | 2,297 | 29.98 | 3,283 | 42.85 | 270 | 3.52 | 1,811 | 23.64 | 7,661 |
| Papakura | —N/a | 4,642 | 41.98 | 2,980 | 26.95 | 831 | 7.51 | 2,605 | 23.56 | 11,058 |
| Puketāpapa | —N/a | 5,814 | 43.05 | 4,722 | 34.96 | 507 | 3.75 | 2,462 | 18.23 | 13,505 |
| Rodney | Dairy Flat | 1,546 | 63.86 | 372 | 15.37 | 187 | 7.72 | 316 | 13.05 | 2,421 |
| Rodney | Kumeu | 5,193 | 49.21 | 1,922 | 18.21 | 1,913 | 18.13 | 1,524 | 14.44 | 10,552 |
| Rodney | Warkworth | 4,730 | 54.65 | 1,761 | 20.35 | 1,004 | 11.60 | 1,160 | 13.40 | 8,655 |
| Rodney | Wellsford | 839 | 43.25 | 318 | 16.39 | 456 | 23.51 | 327 | 16.86 | 1,940 |
| Upper Harbour | Upper Harbour | 8,943 | 53.53 | 3,194 | 19.12 | 1,169 | 7.00 | 3,402 | 20.36 | 16,708 |
| Waiheke | —N/a | 1,296 | 36.03 | 1,767 | 49.12 | 127 | 3.53 | 407 | 11.31 | 3,597 |
| Waitākere Ranges | —N/a | 5,574 | 36.05 | 6,170 | 39.90 | 1,671 | 10.81 | 2,048 | 13.24 | 15,463 |
| Waitematā | —N/a | 9,744 | 44.32 | 9,923 | 45.13 | 529 | 2.41 | 1,791 | 8.15 | 21,987 |
| Whau | —N/a | 5,985 | 34.01 | 7,001 | 39.79 | 1,184 | 6.73 | 3,427 | 19.47 | 17,597 |
| Total | | 181,810 | 45.56 | 124,802 | 31.28 | 25,021 | 6.27 | 67,384 | 16.89 | 399,017 |

Vote share by local board subdivision

Wayne Brown

Efeso Collins

Craig Lord
