= Leighton Baker =

New Zealand politician

2nd Leader of New Conservative
- In office 24 January 2017 – 19 November 2020
- Deputy: Elliot Ikilei
- Preceded by: Colin Craig
- Succeeded by: Elliot Ikilei

Personal details
- Born: 1966 or 1967 (age 58–59) Lower Hutt area, Wellington, New Zealand
- Other political affiliations: Leighton Baker Party (2023–2024); New Conservative (2011–2020); Kiwi Party (2008)
- Spouse: Sue Baker
- Children: 4
- Occupation: Businessman and politician
- Website: leightonbakerparty.co.nz

Leighton James Baker is a New Zealand political candidate and businessman. He was leader of the New Conservative Party from 2017 to 2020, and has contested every general election since 2008, initially for the Kiwi Party, without success.

Baker joined the Conservative Party in 2011, shortly after its founding. He led the party through the 2017 and 2020 general elections, in which the party received 0.2% and 1.5% of the party vote. The party replaced him as its leader shortly after the 2020 election, and according to the party he left it around November 2020.

Baker participated in the 2022 Wellington protests, and was arrested on 2 March 2022 on charges of trespassing and obstruction. His short-lived Leighton Baker Party received 0.07% of the party vote in the 2023 election.

== Political career ==
Baker stood for the Kiwi Party in the 2008 general election, the only election it contested. Like many other Kiwi Party members, he joined the Conservative Party after it was founded in 2011. He stood for it in the 2011 and subsequent elections.

Baker was on the board of the Conservative Party until he resigned from it in March 2015, with then-leader and founder Colin Craig saying that Baker did not want the commitment of board meetings. Craig resigned from the party in June 2015, and all but one of the board members resigned that same month, with the last remaining one resigning in July 2015. By mid-November 2015, Baker had been elected by the party to be the party board chair, though some media reports referred to him as the party spokesman. The board ran the party in place of a single leader from after Craig's resignation until 24 January 2017, when it announced Baker was the new party leader.

=== 2017 general election ===
When the University of Auckland Debating Society organised a cross-party debate in March 2017, more parties than expected accepted the invitation and the society decided to limit it to parties that had been in Parliament, and they withdrew the invitation to the Conservatives. Baker stated that, despite thinking the move was unfair, he would not follow Colin Craig's footsteps by taking the matter to court.

Baker contested the Epsom electorate in the 2017 New Zealand general election held on 23 September. The Conservatives' share of the party vote fell to 0.2% (6,253) in the election, below the five percent margin needed to enter Parliament. Baker came sixth in the Epsom race with 0.6% of the vote, the seat being won by the incumbent David Seymour, the leader of the ACT Party.

Following the 2017 election, Baker remained leader, with the Conservatives rebranding themselves as the New Conservative Party at their annual general meeting in November 2017.

=== 2020 general election ===
In early October 2020, Baker unsuccessfully challenged public broadcaster TVNZ's decision to exclude the New Conservatives from the TVNZ Minor Parties' election debate.

Baker contested Waimakariri in the 2020 New Zealand general election held on 17 October, coming third place with 2,057 votes. His party received 1.5% of the party vote. Following the election, the New Conservative party board decided to replace him as leader with his deputy, Elliot Ikilei. Baker told The Spinoff that he was "obviously disappointed," and that he would spend some time considering whether to remain involved with the party. According to the New Conservative Party, Baker had left the party around November 2020 and “currently has no association nor ever likely to be”.

=== 2023 general election ===
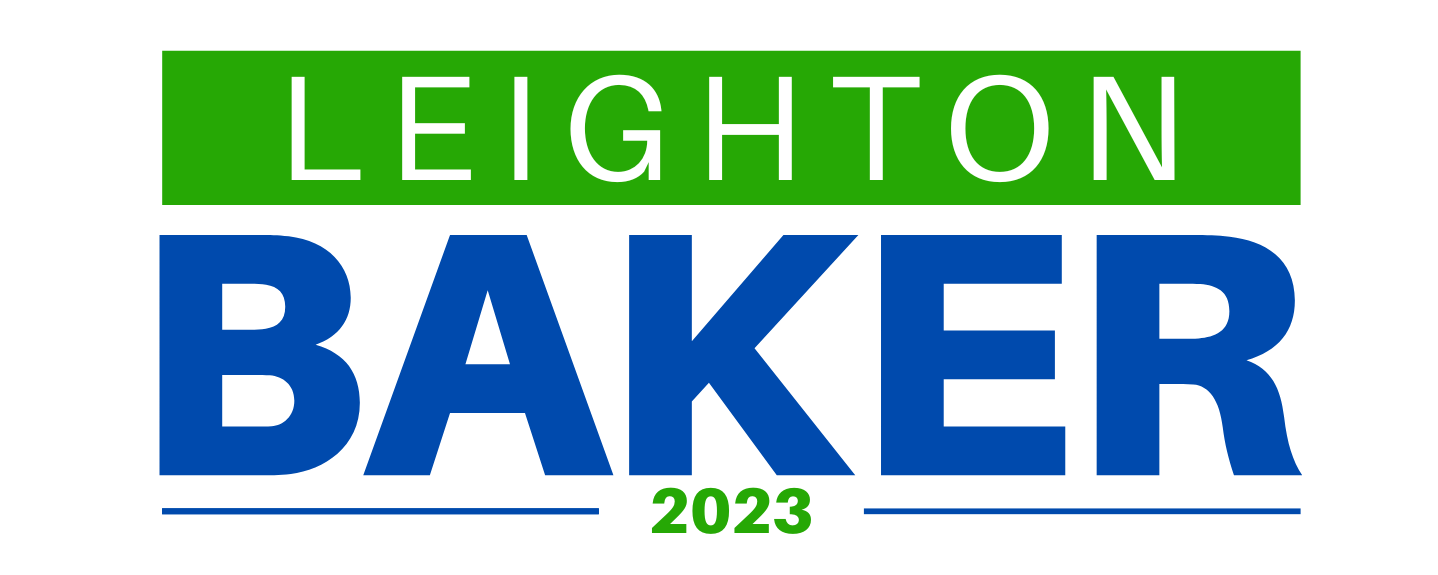
Leighton Baker Party logo

In June 2023, Baker formed a new party named the Leighton Baker Party. The Electoral Commission registered the party on 16 August. Three 1News polls, taken between the party's registration and the end of September, found support for the Leighton Baker Party to be between zero and 0.1%. In the election, the Leighton Baker Party received 0.07% of the party vote, and Baker himself came fourth in the Waimakariri electorate with 3.9% of the electorate vote.

Following the preliminary results, Baker stated "maybe there's not that many people that agree with us, but we still have an obligation to present a different view." The party was deregistered at its own request in May 2024.

== Electoral history ==
Baker has contested electorates seven times, all unsuccessfully. He has also never entered Parliament as a list MP; his best party vote result was in 2020 with the New Conservative Party who received 3.97% of the party vote, short of the 5% threshold.

| Year | Electorate | Party | % of vote | Position | Notes |
|---|---|---|---|---|---|
| 2008 | Waimakariri | Kiwi Party | 1.4% | 6th | |
| 2011 | Christchurch East | Conservative | 1.9% | 4th | |
| 2013 | Christchurch East | Conservative | 3.6% | 4th | A by-election. |
| 2014 | Christchurch East | Conservative | 4.0% | 4th | |
| 2017 | Epsom | New Conservative | 0.6% | 6th (last) | |
| 2020 | Waimakariri | New Conservative | 4.4% | 3rd | This was Baker's best result to date. |
| 2023 | Waimakariri | Leighton Baker | 3.9% | 4th | Preliminary results |

== Political views ==
Baker, a conservative Christian, is known for his support of family values, and scepticism about the "social experiment" policies of a series of left-of-centre governing coalitions. According to Bob McCoskrie of Family First New Zealand, Baker and his party are "opposed to redefining marriage. They're opposed to decriminalisation of abortion, marijuana and euthanasia. They're opposed to the anti-smacking law, gender theory and prostitution. What I can surmise from that is the Conservative Party agrees with everything Family First says."

=== 2022 Wellington protests ===
Baker and his daughter Chantelle Baker took part in the 2022 Wellington protests against vaccine mandates. A 16 February article noted that he had attended the protest every day. He sometimes acted as a liaison between the police and the protesters. During the protests, his daughter promoted conspiracies online, including that the vaccine could make a person "magnetic", and that fires started by protesters were started by police and by instigators working for the police. He was arrested during the riotous climax of the protest on 2 March, charged with trespassing and obstruction. He was released on bail under the condition that he neither breach nor encourage anyone else to breach COVID-19 health orders.

In late September 2022, the Police withdrew their charges of trespassing and resisting police against Baker. Baker welcomed the Police's decision to drop all charges against him, describing the charge of resisting police as "bizarre."

== Personal life and professional career ==
Baker was born in Lower Hutt in 1966 or 1967. He attended a private school in Auckland and moved to North Canterbury in the early 1990s. He has worked on a stud sheep farm in Dargaville, and as a builder, and now runs a residential and commercial building companies. Baker is the owner of Concise Construction, a Rangiora-based firm that has been involved in reconstruction following the 2011 Christchurch earthquake. Baker and his wife, Sue, and have four grown children.

Baker's daughter Chantelle Baker is a social media influencer who has promoted anti-vaccine, disinformation, and conspiracy theories. She and Baker participated in the 2022 Wellington protest.
