= Elliot Ikilei =

New Zealand politician

- Ikilei in 2020

3rd Leader of New Conservative
- In office 19 November 2020 – 30 December 2020
- Preceded by: Leighton Baker

2nd Deputy Leader of New Conservative
- In office 24 January 2017 – 19 November 2020
- Leader: Leighton Baker
- Preceded by: Christine Rankin
- Succeeded by: Victoria O'Brien

Personal details
- Born: 25 June 1977 (age 49) Palmerston North, New Zealand
- Party: New Zealand First (2026–); New Conservative
- Spouse: Eona Ikilei
- Children: Jeslyn Ikilei; Eli Ikilei

Elliot Ewen Pasione Ikilei (born 25 June 1977) is a New Zealand politician. He is a member of the New Zealand First party, having previously been a member of the New Conservative Party, and has contested two general elections without success. He was the New Conservative Party's deputy leader from 2017 to 2020, and as its leader for six weeks in 2020 before announcing on 31 December that he had resigned the leadership.

== Personal life and career outside of politics ==
Elliot Ikilei was born on 25 June 1977 and grew up in the Auckland suburbs of Point England, Glen Innes, and Mount Wellington. He spent his teenage years in Hamilton. According to Ikilei, he struggled with drug and alcohol addiction during his youth before undergoing a "born again" experience and converting to Christianity at the age of 25.

Ikilei has worked as a youth worker in Auckland's Flat Bush and Botany Downs suburbs. He currently lives in Papakura in South Auckland. He is married to Eona, a Singaporean, and the couple have two children named Jeslyn and Eli.

== Political activity ==
=== 2017 general election ===
In the lead-up to the 2017 general election, Ikilei was designated as the Conservative Party candidate for a cross-party debate in March 2017 organised by the University of Auckland's Debating Society. However, the Conservatives were uninvited when the society decided to limit participants to parties that were represented in the New Zealand Parliament. At a subsequent debate at the University of Auckland, Ikilei advocated government prohibitions of abortion and supported citizen-initiated referendums.

In June 2017, Ikilei was appointed as the Conservative Party deputy leader and nominated as the party's candidate for the Manurewa electorate; he got 342 votes and came last of six candidates. The Conservatives overall performed poorly during the election, winning only 0.2% of the party vote (6,253 votes) and did not win any seats in Parliament.

=== Activity between elections ===
After the Conservatives rebranded themselves as the New Conservatives, Ikilei defended controversial far-right Canadians Lauren Southern and Stefan Molyneux, who had been denied public speaking venues during their tour of Auckland in July 2018. In August 2018, Ikilei seconded former National and ACT parties leader Don Brash during a debate on free speech and "political correctness" at the University of Auckland, which attracted the attention of protesters.

In October 2018, Ikilei was designated as the party's candidate for the scheduled Botany by-election, triggered by Jami-Lee Ross' resignation from the National Party. However, the by-election did not go ahead since Ross opted to remain in Parliament as an independent candidate.

During the COVID-19 pandemic in New Zealand, Ikilei attended an anti-lockdown "liberty march" in Auckland's Queen Street, which attracted hundreds of demonstrators including Advance New Zealand party co-leader Jami-Lee Ross.

=== 2020 general election ===
In April 2020, the New Conservative Party announced Ikilei as their candidate for the 2020 New Zealand general election for the new electorate of Takanini (at the time proposed to be called "Flat Bush") that had been created following population changes. He campaigned on increasing support for neighbourhood police teams in Takanini and improving local road infrastructure.

At the election, held on 17 October, Ikilei came fourth in Takinini with 939 votes. The New Conservatives received 1.5% of the party vote (42,615 votes), below the five percent threshold needed to enter Parliament. As such, Ikilei again did not enter Parliament.

Following the election results, Ikilei said that the party would be contest the next general election scheduled for 2023. Ikilei attributed the party's failure to enter Parliament to factors including insufficient media coverage of minor parties and shortcomings in the New Conservative's campaign messaging such as their Māori language policies.

=== Leadership of the party ===
In November 2020, the party's board voted for Ikilei to be its leader, replacing Leighton Baker. Ikilei said that there would not be significant changes to the party's policy, but he would be taking a "more aggressive and confrontational approach to presentation style."

On 31 December, six weeks into the role, Ikilei announced his resignation as leader on Twitter.

=== Hobson's Pledge ===
On 27 January 2025, Ikilei represented the advocacy group Hobson's Pledge alongside trustee and civil litigator Thomas Newman during the first day of oral submission hearings on the Treaty Principles Bill. Ikilei and Newman expressed agreement with the first two principles of the legislation but expressed disagreement with the second principle. Ikilei claimed the second principle did not treat people equally and advocated the removal of references to iwi (tribe) and hapū (sub-group) from the bill, reverting to its original draft form. Ikilei also claimed that Hobson's Pledge had been initially denied a slot in the oral hearings until it managed to convince another group Democracy Action to give its speaking slot.

=== 2026 general election ===
In June 2026 Ikilei announced that he would be standing as a candidate for New Zealand First at the 2026 New Zealand general election. He contested the Takanini electorate and was ranked 20th place on the party list.

During the 2026 general election held on 7 November, Ikilie came third place during the Takanini race behind the incumbent National MP Rima Nakhle and Labour candidate Kharag Singh; receiving 1,880 votes based on preliminary results. He also did not make into Parliament via the NZ First party list.

== Political views ==
Ikilei is socially conservative, opposing abortion, supporting cannabis prohibition and taking a traditional stance on family, law and order, and welfare. In April 2019, Ikilei was temporarily suspended from Twitter for tweeting "'Trans women' are men with dysphoria/disorder, to be treated with compassion and tolerance"; a remark condemned by many as transphobic. Ikilei has defended controversial Australian rugby player Israel Folau's opposition to homosexuality.

Ikilei has described free speech as a cornerstone of Western culture. He has also advocated "tough on crime" policies and opposed Māori seats. In August 2019, Ikilei welcomed a deal between the Māori tribe Te Kawerau ā Maki and Fletcher Building over the Ihumātao land dispute. He has also criticised China's Hong Kong national security law.
