= Conservative Party NZ =

Conservative political party in New Zealand

- Secretary: Jan Taylor
- Leader: Helen Houghton
- Chairperson: Kevin Stitt
- Founder: Colin Craig
- Founded: 3 August 2011
- Youth wing: Young Conservative
- Membership: Est. 1,000–1,500 members (July 2019)
- Ideology: Conservatism; Social conservatism Right-wing populism
- Political position: Right-wing
- Colours: Turquoise, black, white
- MPs in the House of Representatives: 0 / 120

Website
- conservatives.org.nz

The Conservative Party NZ, formerly New Conservatives, is a conservative political party in New Zealand. Some opponents and observers have described the party's policies as far-right, though the party now states it has moved to a "more centrist" position under new leadership. It advocates for lower taxation, anti-abortion measures and austerity cuts.

It was founded as the Conservative Party in August 2011 by businessman and political activist Colin Craig, who led the party from its foundation until his resignation in June 2015. The party had two members on the Upper Harbour Local Board in Auckland from 2013 to 2016. The party has contested the four general elections from 2011 through 2020 without winning any seats. At the 2014 election it received 3.97% of the vote. At the 2020 general election, they gained 1.5% of the vote. The party changed its name to New Conservative in November 2017, and then to New Conservatives in 2023. The party returned to its original name, rebranding to Conservative Party NZ in 2026.

== Ideology and policies ==
The Conservative Party NZ's policies include, or have included:

- Protection of free speech.
- A focus on rehabilitation in prison.
- Binding citizens-initiated referendums.
- Linking adjustment to MPs' salaries to changes in the average wage in New Zealand.
- Increasing investment into pollution research, and public/private research and development partnerships.
- Protecting schools, marketplaces, and groups fundraising "from unnecessary bureaucracy".
- Increasing housing access and affordability.
- Recriminalising euthanasia and abortion.

Former co-leader Ted Johnston described the party in November 2021 as "centrist to centre right". He also said that the party no longer advocates removing Māori seats, easing of gun laws, or introducing forced prison labour.

== Leaders and high profile members ==
No.	Leader(s)	Term start	Term end	Period
1	Colin Craig	3 August 2011	19 June 2015	3 years, 10 months and 16 days
Office vacant		19 June 2015	24 January 2017	1 year, 7 months and 5 days
2	Leighton Baker	24 January 2017	19 November 2020	3 years, 9 months and 26 days
3	Elliot Ikilei	19 November 2020	31 December 2020	1 month and 12 days
Office vacant		31 December 2020	10 October 2021	9 months and 10 days
4	Ted Johnston and Helen Houghton	11 October 2021	c. June 2023 (Note: In June 2023, Ted Johnston was referred to as the co-leader, alongside Helen Houghton, on the party's website, however, by July, the website noted him as the deputy leader. On 14 July, the party announced Johnston as their Auckland Central candidate and referred to him as the deputy leader. On 19 July, Newsroom called him the deputy leader of the party, however, when Johnston announced he was leaving the party in September, Tagata Pasifika erroneously called him the co-leader. Back in June 2022, The New Zealand Herald stated that Johnston was deputy leader, having set up a billboard to promote himself in the position for the 2022 Auckland mayoral election., yet Johnston had been serving as a co-leader since October 2021.)	
5	Helen Houghton	c. June 2023	incumbent	

=== List of deputy leaders ===
No.	Name	Term of office		Leader	
1	Christine Rankin	fl. 2014		Craig	
2	Elliot Ikilei	9 June 2017	19 November 2020	Baker	
3	Victoria O'Brien	19 November 2020	c. 25 November 2020	Ikilei	
Office vacant		c. 25 November 2020	c. July 2023	Ikilei	
Office vacant		c. 25 November 2020	c. July 2023	vacant	
Office vacant		c. 25 November 2020	c. July 2023	Houghton	Johnston
4	Ted Johnston	c. July 2023	2 September 2023	Houghton	
Office vacant		2 September 2023		Houghton	

Other past and present high-profile members include:

- Larry Baldock, politician and former MP. Baldock joined in 2011 through an alliance with The Kiwi Party. He left in 2014, as his party membership was suspended while he faced disciplinary action.
- Christine Rankin, former CEO of Work and Income New Zealand. Member from 2012 to 2015.
- Garth McVicar, lobbyist and founder of Sensible Sentencing Trust. Member in 2014, leaving the party after the 2014 general election.
- David Moffett, former CEO of Sport England, NZ Rugby, NRL and Welsh Rugby Union. Joined the Board in January 2019, but as of September 2019 was not listed as a board member on the party's website.
- Gordon Copeland (1943–2018), politician and former MP.

== History ==
=== Colin Craig era, 2011–2016 ===
==== Formation ====
The Conservative Party was founded by Colin Craig, a businessman who had organised a protest march in 2009 and who had stood in the 2010 Auckland mayoral election, polling third with 8.7% of the vote. Craig announced the formation of the Conservative Party on 3 August 2011 at a media event in Newmarket, Auckland. It gained the 500 members required for registration within a month of its founding, and the Electoral Commission registered it on 6 October 2011.

While the Conservative Party is not overtly Christian, many leading members of The Kiwi Party joined it, indicated by the change in colour here.

==== 2011 election ====
The Conservatives contested the 2011 general election. In October 2011 they announced electoral alliances with The Kiwi Party and New Citizen Party, in which their candidates stood instead as Conservatives. The party ran a list of 52 candidates, including Kiwi Party leader Larry Baldock and former New Citizen Botany candidate Paul Young. Craig stood in the Rodney electorate. The party spent NZ$1.88 million on its campaign, the second-highest of any party, with most of the money coming from Craig himself.

During the campaign the party portrayed itself as able to work with either of the two main parties, National and Labour. It highlighted its socially conservative policies of raising the drinking age to 21, parental notification for abortions, and repeal of the "anti-smacking" law. It announced its opposition to National's policy of selling state assets.

The party gained 2.65% of the party vote (59,237 votes), but failed to win any seats in Parliament. Craig came second in Rodney, gaining 8,031 votes – 12,222 votes behind first-time National Party candidate Mark Mitchell.

Following the election, Conservative candidates Larry Baldock and Peter Redman were referred to police for filing false expenses returns and for exceeding the $25,000 cap on election expenses. Colin Craig stated that if the police found any impropriety neither Larry Baldock nor Peter Redman would be allowed to stand as Conservative candidates. The police subsequently declined to lay charges in the matter.

==== 2011 to 2014 ====
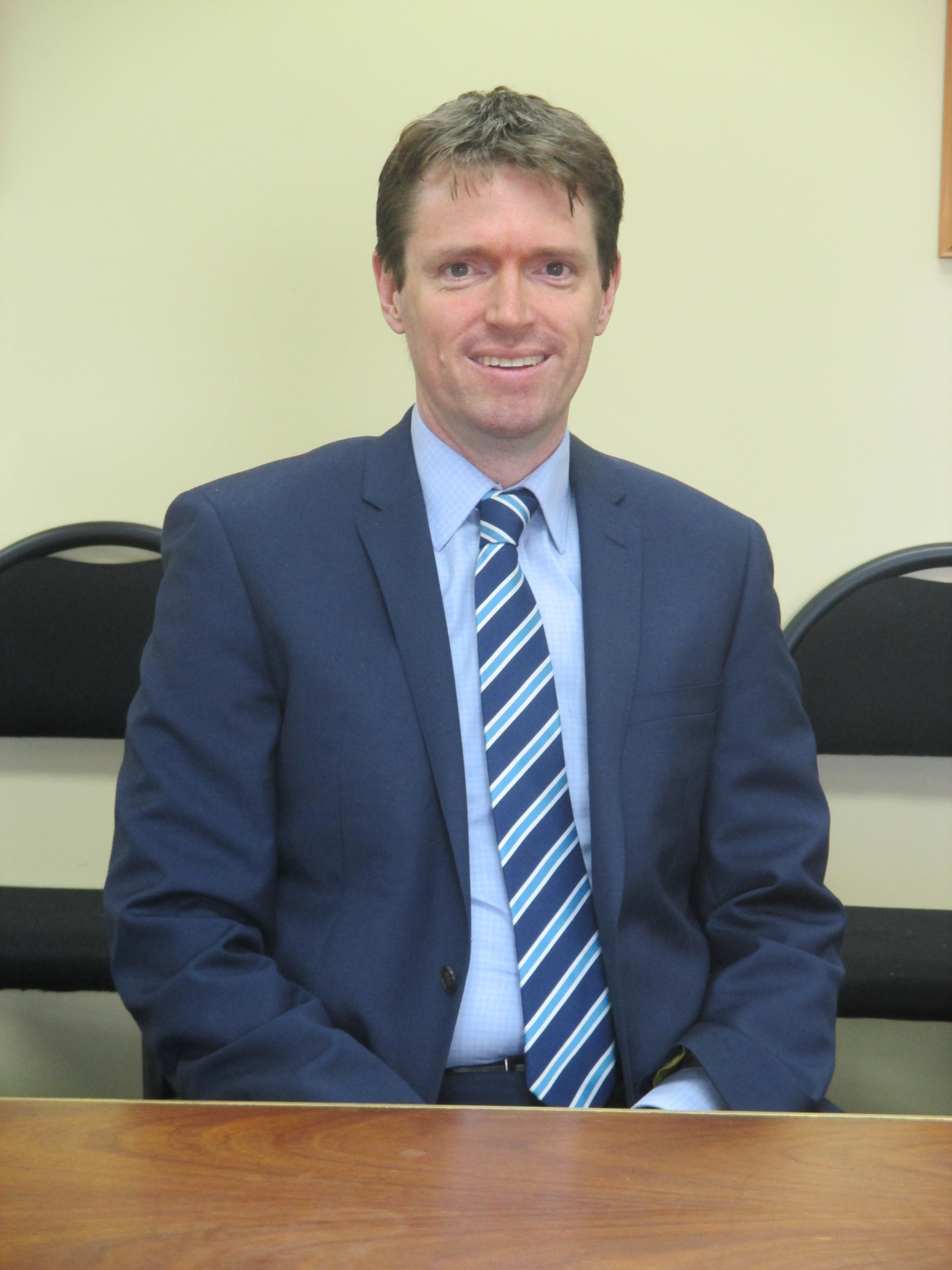
Colin Craig, founder and first leader of the Conservative Party, 2011–2016

In May 2013, the party appointed Christine Rankin, a high-profile former Work and Income New Zealand chief executive, as its own chief executive.

The party contested the 2013 Christchurch East by-election; candidate Leighton Baker polled 494 votes (or 3.6%). The party also contested the 2013 local elections, fielding 27 candidates in Auckland. The party gained 50,218 votes overall, and two candidates (Christine Rankin and Callum Blair) were elected to the Upper Harbour Local Board.

In February 2014, the then-Green Party co-leader Russel Norman spoke at the Big Gay Out event in Auckland and alleged that Colin Craig held misogynistic and homophobic attitudes. In response, Craig filed a defamation suit and demanded that Norman issue an apology. Norman and the Green Party announced that they would contest the lawsuit. On 10 October 2014, the parties settled the lawsuit out of court and agreed to bear their own legal expenses.

==== 2014 election ====
In November 2013, speculation arose in New Zealand news media about a possible accommodation between the Conservatives and the National Party for the 2014 general election. Comments by Prime Minister and National Party leader John Key led to speculation of a coalition in which the National Party would not run a candidate in an electorate on Auckland's North Shore, such as Rodney, East Coast Bays, or the newly formed Upper Harbour. This would have assisted the Conservative Party in meeting the threshold for entering parliament. Ultimately, National ran candidates in all these electorates. After some indecision, Craig elected to stand in the East Coast Bays electorate. John Key announced on 28 July 2014 that the National party candidate for East Coast Bays, Murray McCully, would not step aside to assist the Conservatives into parliament, nor would National urge its members to vote for Craig.

Among its candidates, the Conservative Party selected its chief executive Christine Rankin to stand in the Epsom electorate and Sensible Sentencing Trust founder Garth McVicar for the Napier electorate. The Electoral Commission awarded the Conservatives $60,000 in advertising funding for the 2014 general election, three times the $20,800 allocation it made to the Conservatives in 2011. On 1 August 2014, Colin Craig revealed that China-based firm Shanghai Pengxin was purchasing Lochinver Station, a large dairy farm, and said that the Conservatives were opposed to the deal.

The party reached 4.6% in a 3 News Reid Research poll released in late August 2014, suggesting that it might break the 5% threshold. On 13 September, a TVNZ Colmar Brunton Poll showed McVicar polling 22% in the Napier electorate, behind both the Labour and National candidates.

The party was to be excluded from a televised debate of minor party leaders, while lower-polling parties such as ACT New Zealand and United Future would have been included. Craig won a High Court injunction on 8 August 2014 to prevent this exclusion, and ultimately appeared in the debate. Shortly before the general election, the party's press secretary Rachel MacGregor resigned, citing Colin Craig's alleged manipulative behaviour.

The Conservative Party received 3.97% of the party vote and won no electorate seats, meaning that it did not meet the threshold to enter Parliament.

==== 2015 resignations of leader and board members ====
On 19 June 2015, Colin Craig resigned as leader of the Conservative Party's leader. Board members had scheduled a meeting for that day to discuss the leadership as it was felt that Craig's recent participation in a television interview (with David Farrier on the debut episode of Newsworthy), conducted in a sauna, had reflected badly on the party. Dissatisfaction had also been expressed over Craig's demeanour toward the party's former press secretary Rachel MacGregor, who had resigned just before the 2014 general election. Dissatisfaction increased when Craig pre-emptively and perhaps unconstitutionally postponed the meeting for a week in order to announce his resignation. On 21 June, The New Zealand Herald reported that Craig had settled the dispute with MacGregor for around NZ$16,000 to NZ$17,000 eight weeks earlier. One News also reported that there was a disagreement between Craig and several of the party's board members. One member, John Stringer, accused Craig of not following the party's constitution. Craig denied the allegation and threatened to take action against Stringer. The chairman of the Board stated that Stringer's views did not reflect the view of the Conservative Party and that his comments were only his opinion. That same day, Craig said that he would consider contesting the party's leadership if he had enough support.

In a media conference on 22 June 2015, Craig admitted that he had "acted inappropriately" toward his press secretary Rachel MacGregor but denied any charge of sexual harassment. In response, MacGregor said that by making the admission, Craig had breached a confidentiality agreement the pair had reached under Human Rights Commission mediation and she disputed his account of the events. Craig's wife Helen Craig said that she was standing by her husband and characterized the charges against him as "false allegations." According to the Herald, several board members of the party including Stringer, Christine Rankin, and Laurence Day indicated support for a change of leadership. A board meeting was scheduled for 27 June 2015 and Day called for Craig to be expelled from the party. Rankin, Garth McVicar, and Bob McCoskrie all ruled out contesting the leadership.

In the week after Craig's resignation, all remaining members of the board apart from Stringer resigned. On 27 June 2015, at the scheduled board meeting, Stringer appointed a new board consisting of himself as chairman and four new members. This board voted to suspend Craig's membership in the party. Stringer said that a final decision about Craig's membership and the appointment of a new leader would be made at a later date. According to One News, Craig later challenged the legality of Stringer's and the board's actions, claiming that Stringer had been suspended from the party. He did not rule out contesting the leadership. Craig's remarks were dismissed by Stringer, who became the party's interim leader.

On 5 July 2015, Stringer resigned as chairman and as a board member, following statements that he had been suspended from the party and was therefore not entitled to hold them. According to the New Zealand Herald, a statement had been made by former chairman Brian Dobbs that Stringer had been suspended, and this meant that the decision by the interim board to suspend Craig's membership was invalid. On 7 July, Craig sent a personal letter to Conservative Party members to apologise for his behaviour and to gauge whether he had sufficient support to return to the party's leadership. On 26 July 2015, a 3News-Reid Research poll reported that support for the party was 0.7 per cent, the lowest it had polled since just before the 2011 general election.

On 29 July 2015, Craig started a lawsuit against several opponents including the New Zealand Taxpayers' Union's executive director Jordan Williams, fellow party member John Stringer, and the right wing blogger Cameron Slater for alleged defamation. Craig also circulated a booklet, titled Dirty Politics and Hidden Agendas, in which he outlined a "campaign of defamatory lies" against him. On 10 August 2015, Stringer responded by lodging a complaint against Craig with the New Zealand Police, alleging that Craig had exceeded his allocated election fund legal limit by NZ$2,000 when contesting the East Coast Bays electorate in 2014. In addition, Stringer criticised Craig's management of the Conservative Party's 2014 election campaign. The following day, Stringer submitted a dossier of documents to both the police and the Electoral Commission. On 14 August 2015, Jordan Williams launched a counter-suit against Craig and several Conservative Party officials in response to Craig's statements at the July press conference and in the circular Dirty Politics and Hidden Agendas. On 11 September 2015, Craig filed a retaliatory defamation suit against the party's former chairman, John Stringer. Stringer indicated that he would contest the charges in court.

On 16 November 2015, Craig announced that he would not be contesting the Conservative Party leadership in light of a police investigation against him over his party's spending during the 2014 general election. Craig also cited the ongoing lawsuits involving him, Cameron Slater, and Stringer as other reasons for his decision not to contest the party leadership. In addition, the newly elected Conservative Party board chair Leighton Baker indicated that the party was "in no hurry" to appoint a new leadership until it had rebuilt its membership base. Ultimately, the police investigation cleared Craig of any wrongdoing.

==== Legal strife and Colin Craig's resignation, 2016 ====
On 19 January 2016, Colin Craig donated NZ$36,000 to the Conservative Party. Despite his lack of involvement with the leadership, he stated that he and his wife still wanted to support the party financially. On 2 February 2016, the party's board validated the decision of the previous board to suspend John Stringer's membership. The suspension was part of an ongoing internal conflict within the party between Stringer and former party leader Craig. On 1 March 2016, it was reported that Stringer had dropped his defamation suit against Craig and was seeking legal advice to ensure that his statement of defence complied with court rules for defamation cases. However, Craig's lawsuit against Stringer and Jordan Williams' lawsuit against Craig remained ongoing.

In September 2016, the Auckland High Court began hearing Jordan Williams' defamation lawsuit against Craig, expected to last five weeks. On 7 September, the former party chief executive and Epsom candidate Christine Rankin testified that revelations about Craig's alleged romantic impropriety with his press secretary Rachel MacGregor had led her to doubt his suitability to lead the Party.

On 12 September, the party's former board member John Stringer alleged that Craig had acted inappropriately toward other women and said that there had been so much concern about his relationship with MacGregor that the party had arranged a chaperone to accompany them whenever they were together. Stringer claimed in his testimony that Craig had dismissed concerns about his alleged sexual impropriety raised by the party's board. He also alleged that Craig had created a "cult-like" atmosphere within the Conservative Party and that Craig had disciplined, harassed, and denigrated members who had disagreed with him. Stringer denied Craig's assertions that there was a "Dirty Politics" strategy within the party to unseat him and claimed that the party had lost confidence in their leader. On 14 and 15 September, MacGregor testified that Craig's alleged harassment during the three years of her employment had contributed to her decision to resign two days prior to the 2014 general election. In her testimony, she cited a pay dispute as the final straw in her decision to resign.

On 16 September, Colin Craig took the stand to testify in his defence. While denying that he sexually harassed MacGregor, Craig likened their relationship to that of siblings. He also admitted kissing her but insisted it was consensual. In his defence, Craig claimed that MacGregor had resigned primarily because he had rejected her marriage proposal on the grounds that he was already married. On 20 September, Craig's wife Helen Craig testified that MacGregor had privately contacted her to confess to having an emotional relationship with Craig and kissing Craig on the night of the 2011 general election. Helen also confirmed that she had forgiven her husband. While Craig had admitted kissing McGregor, he denied undressing or having sexual intercourse with her.

On 21 September, the investigative journalist Nicky Hager testified as an expert witness. In his testimony, he alleged that the information that had been released about Colin Craig on blogs like Cameron Slater's Whale Oil matched the patterns he had documented in his book Dirty Politics, which had inspired Craig's pamphlet "Dirty Politics and Hidden Agendas". Brian Dobbs, the former chairman of the Conservative Party, also testified that he and several other board members had expressed their dissatisfaction with Craig's and MacGregor's relationship. He criticised Craig for proceeding with the 2015 sauna interview without consulting him first. Dobbs disclosed that Williams had shown him a collection of love letters, poems, emails, and other correspondence between Craig and MacGregor in June 2015 in an alleged attempt to turn him against Craig. Dobbs also criticised MacGregor's resignation for contributing to the party's disappointing performance in the 2011 general election.

On 22 September, former Conservative Party board member Laurence Day disputed MacGregor's claim that Colin Craig had sexually harassed her, on the grounds that Williams had failed to present the incriminating alleged "sext" text message. He also alleged that Williams was trying to use the sexual harassment allegations to turn the party board members against Craig; a position that was echoed by another witness, Family First director Bob McCoskrie. Day and McCoskrie supported Craig's assertion that his relationship with MacGregor had been inappropriate but consensual. McCoskrie defended Craig's pamphlet as a response to the alleged "organized campaign" against Craig.

On 23 September, several Conservative Party staff members including Bev Adair-Beets, Angela Storr, and Kevin Stitt disputed MacGregor's sexual harassment allegations against Craig and vouched for the accuracy of Craig's allegations in his "Dirty Politics" pamphlet. While on the stand, the plaintiff Jordan Williams denied using MacGregor for political gain. On 28 September, lawyers representing both parties entered closing arguments. While Jordan Williams' lawyer Peter Knight cited the letters and poems as evidence of Craig's alleged sexual harassment against MacGregor, Craig's lawyer Stephen Mills QC asserted that Craig had the right to defend himself through his "Dirty Politics" pamphlet. Mills also contended that Williams had broken MacGregor's trust by passing information on her relationship with Craig to other Conservative Party officials and Cameron Slater's blog Whale Oil.

On 30 September, the eleven-member jury unanimously ruled against Craig in Jordan Williams' favour. Craig was ordered to pay $1.3 million in compensation and punitive damages to Williams. While Williams and his supporters welcomed the decision, Craig's lawyers announced that they would appeal both the verdict and the amount of damages. Despite the unanimous jury verdict and the level of damages, Craig told Radio NZ in an interview the evening of the verdict that he did not regret publicizing the pamphlet and that he 'stood by' the allegations. On 12 April 2017, a High Court judge dismissed the awarding of $1.27 million to Jordan Williams, saying that the amount was too high and a "miscarriage of justice" had occurred.

On 4 October 2016, Conservative Party chairman Leighton Baker confirmed that Craig had resigned his membership of the party and was not considering any leadership position within the party. Baker also confirmed that the negative publicity had also affected the party's support base and expressed doubts that the party would contest the 2017 general election.

==== 2016 local board elections ====
At the 2016 Auckland local board elections, the Conservative Party lost its two seats. Rankin did not stand again. Blair did stand again, though was not affiliated with Conservative; he narrowly missed a seat, receiving 4,535 votes to the last successful candidate's 4,577.

=== Leighton Baker era, 2017–2020 ===
==== 2017 election ====
The logo of the Conservative Party during the 2017 general election

In January 2017, the party announced that Leighton Baker was its new leader.

In March 2017, the Conservative Party protested its exclusion from a political debate being hosted by the University of Auckland Debating Society. The Party had been invited in November 2016, but the Debating Society later decided to limit participation to parties which were or had been represented in the New Zealand Parliament due to the number of participants. The party issued a press statement accusing the Debating Society of trying to stifle diverse views.

On 26 May 2017, the New Zealand Electoral Commission awarded the Conservative Party an allocation of $51,848 for use in the 2017 election. The party campaigned using the slogan "hit the reset button".

The Conservative Party announced a party list of 12 candidates. Electoral candidates included leader Leighton Baker in Epsom and deputy leader Elliot Ikilei in Manurewa.

The Conservatives gained only 0.2% of the party vote (6,253) during the 2017 general election and failed to win a seat in parliament.

==== Re-branding, November 2017 – October 2020 ====
Following the 2017 general election, Conservative party members voted to change the party's name in November 2017. It was subsequently renamed the "New Conservative Party". As of mid-2019, the party's two key bases were in Canterbury and the Auckland Region, where leader Baker and deputy leader Ikilei are based. Since its revamp, the party has campaigned on free speech issues and conservative family values, and opposed the United Nations' Global Compact for Migration and the decriminalisation of abortion and euthanasia.

In late April 2019, Deputy Leader Ikilei was temporarily suspended from Twitter for posting "'Trans women' are men with dysphoria/disorder, to be treated with compassion and tolerance"; a remark which many regarded as transphobic. While supporting counselling for people with gender dysphoria, the party said that it "recognises that there are two biological genders" and supported the withdrawing of funding from gender reassignment surgeries and the elimination of "gender ideology" from education programs.

While the party condemned the Christchurch mosque shootings, it opposed the Labour-led coalition government's Arms (Prohibited Firearms, Magazines, and Parts) Amendment Act 2019 and gun registration. The party also supported stronger relations with Israel including establishing an embassy in Jerusalem, apologising for United Nations Security Council Resolution 2334, and recognizing Israeli sovereignty over the Golan Heights. The New Conservatives also called on the New Zealand Government to join its Five Eyes allies in condemning the Hong Kong national security law.

==== 2020 general election ====
During the lead-up to the 2020 New Zealand general election, the New Conservatives ruled out an alliance with both the Labour-led coalition and Billy Te Kahika's New Zealand Public Party. The party received a broadcasting allocation of $62,186 for the 2020 election. The party made headlines during the campaign following repeated vandalism of their advertising in multiple cities, for publishing a meme comparing a New Conservative candidate to Nelson Mandela and Abraham Lincoln, and when a candidate repeatedly and falsely claimed to be an ambassador for the Cancer Society charity.

On 6 October 2020, party leader Leighton Baker mounted a legal challenge at the Auckland High Court to protest the party's exclusion from public broadcaster TVNZ's Minor Party debate scheduled for 8 October. TVNZ's inclusion criteria required a party to be in parliament or to have scored at least 3 percent in a 1News Colmar Brunton Poll held during the last six months. The hearing was held on 7 October. The High Court dismissed the New Conservatives' bid, ruling in favor of TVNZ.

On 10 October 2020, it was reported that the New Conservatives' Instagram page had been hacked the previous day with pro-LGBT messages posted on their message feed. In addition, screenshots of the party's logo were shown in rainbow colours. The hack was condemned by party leader Baker and deputy party leader Ikilei, who accused their opponents of intolerance. According to NZME journalist Ethan Griffiths, the hacker had temporarily gained access to the New Conservative Instagram account by posing as Ikilei on Instagram.

On 17 October 2020, the New Zealand general election was held. The New Conservative Party voter share increased from 2017, securing 42,615 party votes, or 1.5%. The election result was not enough to enter parliament. Despite the result, Baker said he was not deterred by defeat and stated that the party would stand for election again in 2023. Similar sentiments were expressed by Ikilei, who attributed the party's failure to enter parliament to insufficient media coverage of smaller parties and shortcomings in the New Conservative's campaign messaging including their Māori language policies.

=== Elliot Ikilei era, November to December 2020 ===
Elliot Ikilei, party leader November–December 2020

Following the 2020 election, the party's board replaced Baker as leader with his deputy, Elliot Ikilei, on 19 November. The chair of the board, Simon Gutschlag, wrote in a newsletter to the party's followers that the board had conducted a review of the leadership and had decided "to look for a fresh approach," which meant "relieving" Baker of his role. Baker posted a statement on Twitter where he described his departure as "a tough day at the office," but wished the new leadership well. Victoria O'Brien, a gun advocate who had been third on the party's list at the 2020 election, succeeded Ikilei as deputy leader. Ikilei complimented his predecessor's devotion to the party and conservative politics while signalling that he would bring a "more aggressive and “confrontational” approach to presentation style."

Less than a week after the leadership change, on 25 November, O'Brien resigned the deputy leadership, saying in a social media post that her decision was "due to a growing divergence between the direction of the party and my beliefs and values.” She later said that she had left because of Leighton Baker's "ongoing involvement with the party." Her announcement occurred in the context of some discontent from party supporters at Baker's removal, which had taken many by surprise. It was declared that deputy leadership would be vacant until a process to fill the role is put in place in early 2021, however, no successor was chosen until around July 2023.

On 31 December 2020, Ikilei announced on his Twitter account that he was resigning as leader of the New Conservatives.

=== Helen Houghton and Ted Johnston era, October 2021–2023 ===
On 11 October 2021, the party's board announced Helen Houghton and Ted Johnston as interim co-leaders. Houghton is from Christchurch and of European descent. She has opposed gender diversity education in schools and stood as the party's Christchurch East candidate. Johnston is from Auckland and of European and Samoan descent. He is also a criminal lawyer, a former candidate for The Opportunities Party, and a mayoral candidate during the 2019 Auckland mayoral election. Houghton and Johnston have said that they are attempting to make the party more attractive to centrist New Zealanders.

For the 2022 Hamilton West by-election, New Conservative announced that it joined with the One Party to stand a single candidate: Rudi du Plooy, a New Conservative Party member. Du Plooy gained 118 votes in that contest, which meant that he came seventh overall.

=== 2023 general election ===
On 2 September 2023, Ted Johnston announced he had left the New Conservatives to form the Unity Party, which allied with the Democratic Alliance for the 2023 election.

In August 2023, the New Conservative's leader Helen Houghton released the party's Family Builder policy, which was costed at NZ$9.1 billion in its first year. Key provisions included allowing workers to keep the first $20,000 they earned, child tax credits, allowing couples to split their income, and shifting funding from early childhood centres to parents with the goal of encouraging at least one parent to work from home. Houghton said that the Family Builder policy was intended to encourage parents not to split up and to protect the family unit. Victoria University of Wellington researcher Max Rashbrooke questioned the effectiveness of the party's Family Builder policy and said that reducing funding for solo parent households could harm vulnerable families.

The party received 0.15% of the party vote and won no electorates.

=== 2026 general election ===
During the 2026 New Zealand general election the party, which had rebranded as Conservative Party NZ, received 0.07% (1,886 votes) of the party vote based on preliminary results.

== Organisation ==
As of mid-2019, the New Conservative Party had 35 electorates across New Zealand covered by committees with teams of convenors and volunteer teams. The party's two main support bases at that time were around the Canterbury and Auckland Regions, where party leader Baker and deputy leader Ikilei are based. According to The Spinoff journalist Alex Braae, the New Conservatives had rebuilt a sophisticated party organisation with active campaigning, handing out pamphlets, and drink bottles with the party's logo. Based on rough figures released by party secretary Kevin Stitt, Braae estimated that the party had around 1000–1500 members.

However, by the 2023 New Zealand general election, the New Conservative Party could only field ten candidates on its party list and came fourteenth in terms of total voter share.

=== Youth wing ===
The New Conservative Party had a youth wing called Young Conservative. The group's website described it as "a supporting youth membership of New Conservative" which "adhere[s] to the principles and policies for which New Conservative stands", and it set out the youth wing's top three policies of "Democracy, Family, and Environment". However, as of August 2020, this website is not operating. In an interview with The Wireless in 2018, Young Conservative opposed same-sex marriage, abortion reform, and affirmative action, and sought an eventual ban on pornography.

=== Tauranga by-election: June 2022 ===
Helen Houghton stood for the New Conservatives in the Tauranga electorate, after former New Zealand National Party leader Simon Bridges stepped down from Parliament. She won 103 votes in all, placing eighth out of a field of twelve candidates and outpolled by the rival conservative Christian ONE Party candidate as well as the Aotearoa Legalise Cannabis Party candidate

=== Auckland mayoral election: October 2022 ===
Ted Johnston stood for the October 2022 Auckland mayoral election in October 2022. He gained 3761 votes in all, or 1.22 percent of the total voter turnout and came ninth out of a field of twenty-three candidates

== Election results ==
=== House of Representatives ===
Election	Candidates nominated		Seats won	Votes	Vote share %	Position	Conservatives in parliament
Election	Electorate	List	Seats won	Votes	Vote share %	Position	Conservatives in parliament
2011	52	30	0 / 121	59,237	▲2.65%	5th	Not in Parliament
2014	64	20	0 / 121	95,598	▲3.97%	5th	Not in Parliament
2017	27	12	0 / 120	6,253	▼0.24%	8th	Not in Parliament
2020	72	24	0 / 120	42,615	▲1.50%	8th	Not in Parliament
2023	10	10	0 / 123	4,532	▼0.15%	14th	Not in Parliament
2026	5	8	0 / 123	TBD	TBD	TBD	Not in Parliament

=== Auckland local boards ===
	Candidates	Total votes	Seats won	Local board(s)
2013	27/146	67,106	2 / 146	Upper Harbour
2016	0/146	0.00	0 / 146	

== See also ==
- New Zealand political parties
