= Waro railway station =

Defunct railway station in New Zealand

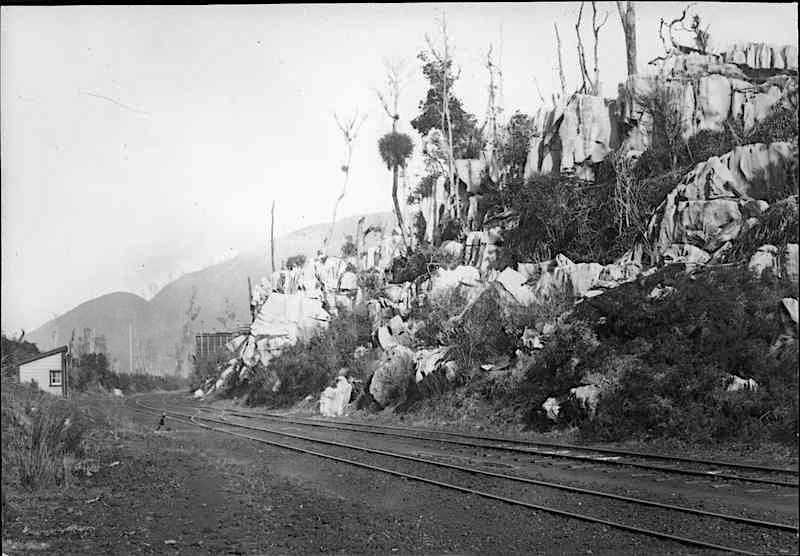
- Waro in 1902

General information
- Location: New Zealand
- Coordinates: 35.588787°S 174.287112°E
- Elevation: 105 m (344 ft)
- Line: North Auckland Line
- Distance: Westfield Junction 233.56 km (145.13 mi)

History
- Opened: 2 July 1894
- Closed: 31 October 1960 passenger, 12 March 1972 goods
- Former names: Limestone Rocks until 30 June 1894

Services
Preceding station	Historical railways	Following station
Otonga; Line open, station closed 4.21 km (2.62 mi)	North Auckland Line; KiwiRail	Hikurangi; Line open, station closed 1.73 km (1.07 mi)
Location

Waro railway station was a flag station on the North Auckland Line in New Zealand.

The station was part of the Whangārei and Kamo section, opened on 2 July 1894. The extension of the line north to Whakapara opened in 1896.

A stationmaster's house was designed in 1895, though there seems to be no mention of it being built. From 1897 to 1899 there was a caretaker at Waro. Railway houses were built in 1894 and 1898. By 1897 the station had a shelter shed, passenger platform and sidings to several coal mines and limestone quarries. Hikurangi Coal and Northern Coal had sidings between Waro and Otonga in 1911. In 1916 there was concern about the danger to the railway from blasting at the Dominion Cement quarry, had 20acres at Waro to extract white limestone. and had been further enlarged by Wilsons Portland Cement by 1926. Waro Mine produced 681,905 tons of coal, mainly for Wilson's Portland Cement, but flooding brought about closure of the mines in the 1930s. The sidings to the limestone quarries were still in use in 1964. Waro station closed on 12 March 1972.

Only a single track now runs through the station site.

== See also ==
- Waro Limestone Scenic Reserve
