= Whangaruru =

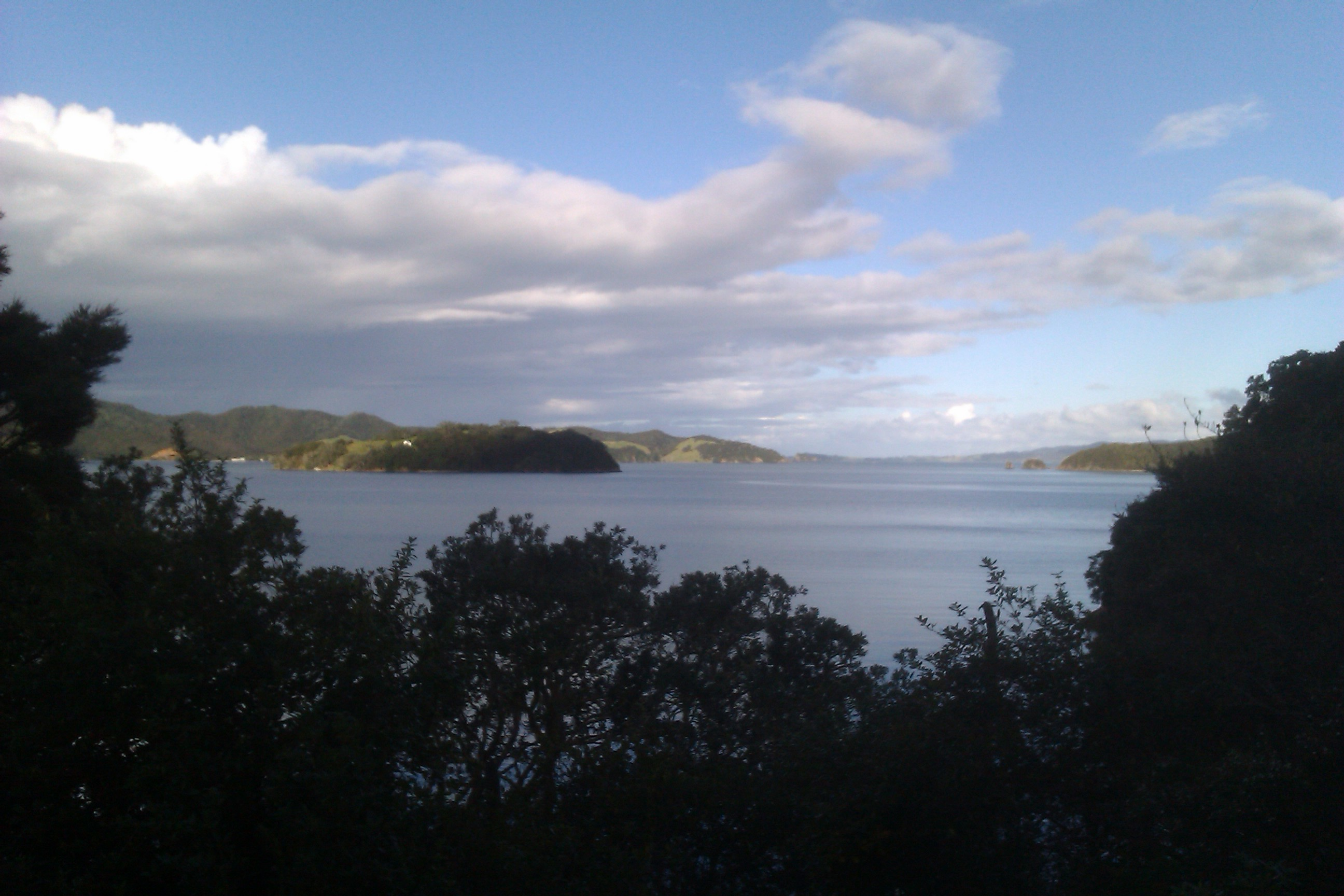
- Interactive map of Whangaruru
- Coordinates: 35°20′51″S 174°19′35″E
- Country: New Zealand
- Region: Northland Region
- District: Whangarei District
- Ward: Hikurangi-Coastal Ward

Government
  - Territorial Authority: Whangarei District Council
  - Regional council: Northland Regional Council
  - Mayor of Whangārei: Ken Couper
  - Whangārei MP: Lloyd Budd
  - Te Tai Tokerau MP: TBD

Area
  - Total: 2.03 km^{2} (0.78 sq mi)

Population (June 2025)
  - Total: 180
  - Density: 89/km^{2} (230/sq mi)

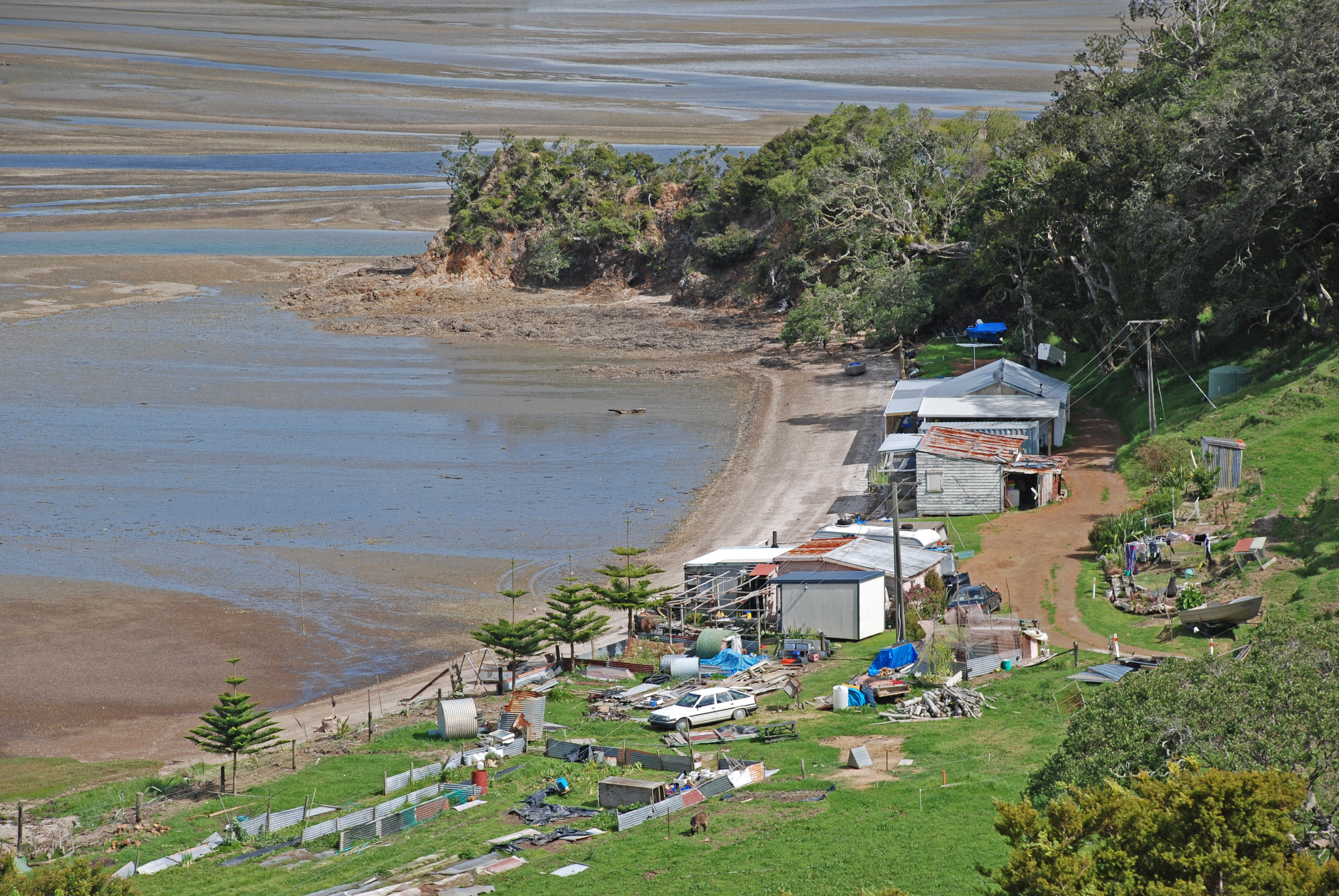
A rural home on Whangaruru Harbour

Whangaruru (Māori pronunciation: [faŋaɾuɾu]) is a rural community and harbour on the east coast of Northland, New Zealand. Mokau, Helena Bay, Whakapara, Hikurangi and Whangārei are to the south and the Bay of Islands is to the northwest.

The Whangaruru area includes the villages of Punaruku west of the harbour, Whangaruru north of the harbour, Whangaruru North east of the harbour, and Ōakura.

The area was reputedly named by Puhimoanariki who was sailing up the coast. After searching for a long time he found shelter from bad weather there. The name "Whangaruru" is a Māori-language word meaning "sheltered harbour", and is a direct linguistic cognate with "Honolulu" in the related Hawaiian language.

== Marae ==
The Ngātiwai hapū of Te Uri o Hikihiki are the indigenous people of Whangaruru.

The hapū has several traditional meeting grounds in the Whangaruru and Panaruku area, including the Ngātiwai Marae and Ngāti Wai Soldiers' Memorial Hall, the Ōtetao Reti Marae and Hoori Reti meeting house, and the Tuparehuia Marae.

In October 2020, the Government committed $444,239 from the Provincial Growth Fund to upgrade Ōtetao Reti Marae, creating 33 jobs. It also committed $295,095 to upgrade Ngātiwai Marae, creating 5 jobs.

== Demographics ==
Statistics New Zealand describes Ōakura-Whangaruru South as a rural settlement. The settlement covers 2.03 km^{2} (0.78 sq mi) and had an estimated population of 180 as of June 2025, with a population density of 89 people per km^{2}. The settlement is part of the larger Whangaruru statistical area.

Historical population for Ōakura-Whangaruru South
Year	Pop.	±% p.a.
2006	159	—
2013	111	−5.00%
2018	150	+6.21%
2023	159	+1.17%

Ōakura-Whangaruru South had a population of 159 in the 2023 New Zealand census, an increase of 9 people (6.0%) since the 2018 census, and an increase of 48 people (43.2%) since the 2013 census. There were 75 males and 81 females in 81 dwellings. 1.9% of people identified as LGBTIQ+. The median age was 61.5 years (compared with 38.1 years nationally). There were 15 people (9.4%) aged under 15 years, 18 (11.3%) aged 15 to 29, 54 (34.0%) aged 30 to 64, and 69 (43.4%) aged 65 or older.

People could identify as more than one ethnicity. The results were 69.8% European (Pākehā), 35.8% Māori, 15.1% Pasifika, and 3.8% other, which includes people giving their ethnicity as "New Zealander". English was spoken by 96.2%, Māori language by 11.3%, and other languages by 5.7%. No language could be spoken by 1.9% (e.g. too young to talk). The percentage of people born overseas was 11.3, compared with 28.8% nationally.

Religious affiliations were 47.2% Christian, 1.9% Māori religious beliefs, 1.9% New Age, and 1.9% other religions. People who answered that they had no religion were 35.8%, and 11.3% of people did not answer the census question.

Of those at least 15 years old, 12 (8.3%) people had a bachelor's or higher degree, 84 (58.3%) had a post-high school certificate or diploma, and 39 (27.1%) people exclusively held high school qualifications. The median income was $24,600, compared with $41,500 nationally. 6 people (4.2%) earned over $100,000 compared to 12.1% nationally. The employment status of those at least 15 was that 36 (25.0%) people were employed full-time, 21 (14.6%) were part-time, and 3 (2.1%) were unemployed.

=== Whangaruru statistical area ===
The statistical area of Whangaruru covers 469.26 km^{2} (181.18 sq mi) and had an estimated population of 2,820 as of June 2025, with a population density of 6.0 people per km^{2}.

Historical population for the Whangaruru statistical area
Year	Pop.	±% p.a.
2006	2,067	—
2013	2,100	+0.23%
2018	2,520	+3.71%
2023	2,733	+1.64%

Whangaruru statistical area had a population of 2,733 in the 2023 New Zealand census, an increase of 213 people (8.5%) since the 2018 census, and an increase of 633 people (30.1%) since the 2013 census. There were 1,413 males, 1,311 females and 9 people of other genders in 999 dwellings. 1.8% of people identified as LGBTIQ+. The median age was 46.3 years (compared with 38.1 years nationally). There were 531 people (19.4%) aged under 15 years, 372 (13.6%) aged 15 to 29, 1,257 (46.0%) aged 30 to 64, and 576 (21.1%) aged 65 or older.

People could identify as more than one ethnicity. The results were 77.7% European (Pākehā); 38.4% Māori; 4.7% Pasifika; 2.0% Asian; 0.8% Middle Eastern, Latin American and African New Zealanders (MELAA); and 2.0% other, which includes people giving their ethnicity as "New Zealander". English was spoken by 97.3%, Māori language by 9.0%, Samoan by 0.3%, and other languages by 4.9%. No language could be spoken by 2.3% (e.g. too young to talk). New Zealand Sign Language was known by 0.8%. The percentage of people born overseas was 12.8, compared with 28.8% nationally.

Religious affiliations were 30.7% Christian, 0.2% Hindu, 0.4% Islam, 1.5% Māori religious beliefs, 0.2% Buddhist, 1.0% New Age, and 1.1% other religions. People who answered that they had no religion were 58.2%, and 6.9% of people did not answer the census question.

Of those at least 15 years old, 273 (12.4%) people had a bachelor's or higher degree, 1,278 (58.0%) had a post-high school certificate or diploma, and 579 (26.3%) people exclusively held high school qualifications. The median income was $31,000, compared with $41,500 nationally. 138 people (6.3%) earned over $100,000 compared to 12.1% nationally. The employment status of those at least 15 was that 963 (43.7%) people were employed full-time, 333 (15.1%) were part-time, and 42 (1.9%) were unemployed.

== Education ==
Whangaruru School is a coeducational full primary (years 1-8) school with a roll of 38 students as of July 2026. The school was founded in 2005 to replace Punaruku, Ngaiotonga Valley and Helena Bay Schools. It is on the site of the old Punaruku School.

Te Kura Hourua ki Whangaruru was a secondary (years 9-13) partnership school opened in 2014, and closed in 2016.
