= Lloyd Budd =

Lloyd Budd may refer to:

- Lloyd Budd (cricketer) (1913–1986), English cricketer and umpire
- Lloyd Budd (politician) (born 1982 or 1983), New Zealand politician and business executive
