= Emily Henderson (politician) =

New Zealand politician

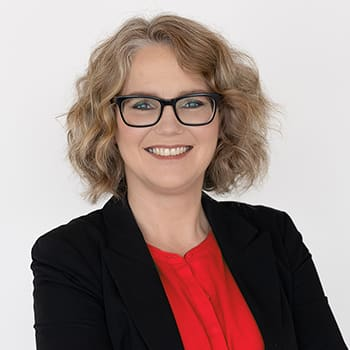

Member of the New Zealand Parliament for Whangārei
- In office 17 October 2020 – 14 October 2023
- Preceded by: Shane Reti
- Succeeded by: Shane Reti
- Majority: 431

Personal details
- Born: 1972 (age 53–54)
- Party: Labour
- Spouse: Thomas Biss
- Children: 4
- Education: Auckland (MJur); Cambridge (PhD)
- Profession: Lawyer
- Website: Labour Party profile

Lorenza Emily Preston Henderson is a New Zealand lawyer and former politician. She was a member of parliament in the House of Representatives for the Labour Party.

== Biography ==
Henderson was born in 1972 and has lived in Whangārei since the age of seven. She attended Kaurihohore Primary, Whangarei Intermediate and Tikipunga High School. She completed a Master of Jurisprudence at the University of Auckland in 1997 and a PhD titled Cross-examination: a critical examination at the University of Cambridge in 2001.

=== Legal career ===
Before becoming a Member of Parliament in 2020, she worked as a consultant at the law firm Henderson Reeves, which was co-founded by her father. Her legal area of specialty is the Family Court and she was a crown prosecutor. In 2012, she was awarded a fellowship from the New Zealand Law Foundation in 2012 to research the reform of cross examination. The resulting paper, "Expert witnesses under examination in the New Zealand criminal and family courts", was published in March 2013.

=== Political career ===
New Zealand Parliament
Years	Term	Electorate	List	Party
2020–2023	53rd	Whangārei	64	Labour

Henderson was approached to stand in the Whangārei electorate for the Labour Party in 2017, but declined, because her children were too young. She was selected as Labour's candidate for the 2020 election. The preliminary results released after the election night count placed her 164 votes behind the incumbent MP, National's Shane Reti. The closeness of the initial figures meant that Henderson attended induction events for new MPs. When the final results were released after the counting of special votes, Henderson had overtaken Reti to win the seat by 431 votes, and hence became a Member of Parliament.

Henderson was appointed as a member of the Justice Committee and the Social Services and Community Committee in December 2020. She was deputy chair of the Social Services and Community committee from July 2022 to February 2023 and deputy chair of the Justice Committee from February to September 2023. Henderson chaired a sub-committee of the Conversion Practices Prohibition Legislation and voted in favour of the bill.

On 17 March, Henderson announced that she would retire from Parliament at the 2023 New Zealand general election in order to return to her legal career, focusing on court reform and sexual violence. She said she had not expected to be elected (the Whangārei electorate had been won by National for the previous 45 years) and did not consider the role of a Member of Parliament to be well-aligned with her preference for and skillset in legal research and teaching. Upon ending her term in Parliament, Henderson claimed credit for establishing Sexual Violence Courts, lobbying for government funding to rebuild Whangarei Hospital and state housing projects in Whangarei.

New Zealand Parliament
Preceded by Shane Reti	Member of Parliament for Whangārei; 2020–2023	Succeeded by Shane Reti
