= Phil Heatley =

New Zealand politician

The Honourable Philip Heatley
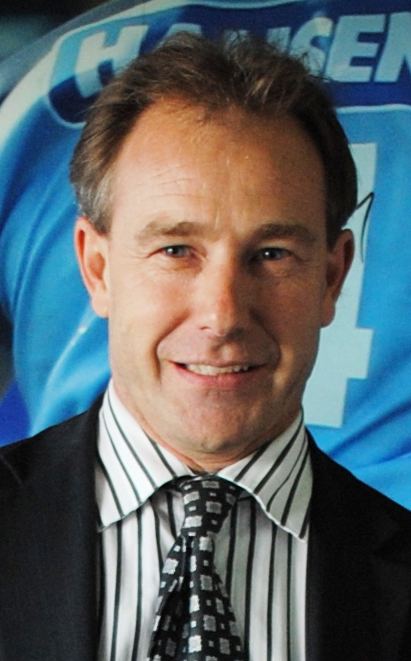
- Heatley in 2011

Minister of Fisheries
- In office 19 November 2008 – 25 February 2010
- Prime Minister: John Key
- Preceded by: Jim Anderton
- Succeeded by: none (Ministry merged)

Minister of Fisheries and Aquaculture
- In office 1 April 2010 – 14 December 2011
- Prime Minister: John Key
- Preceded by: new Ministry
- Succeeded by: none (Ministry merged)

14th Minister of Energy and Resources
- In office 14 December 2011 – 29 January 2013
- Prime Minister: John Key
- Preceded by: Gerry Brownlee
- Succeeded by: Simon Bridges

Minister of Housing
- In office 19 November 2008 – 25 February 2010
- Prime Minister: John Key
- Preceded by: Maryan Street
- Succeeded by: Maurice Williamson (acting)
- In office 1 April 2010 – 22 January 2013
- Preceded by: Maurice Williamson (acting)
- Succeeded by: Nick Smith

Member of the New Zealand Parliament for Whangarei
- In office 16 December 1999 – 14 August 2014
- Preceded by: John Banks
- Succeeded by: Shane Reti

Personal details
- Born: 5 April 1967 (age 59)
- Party: National Party
- Occupation: Agricultural engineer

Philip Reeve Heatley (born 5 April 1967) is a New Zealand politician. He is a member of the National Party. From 2008 until January 2013, he was a member of cabinet, holding the portfolios of Fisheries, Fisheries and Aquaculture, Energy and Resources, and Housing, before being replaced in a cabinet reshuffle by Prime Minister John Key. Heatley retired from Parliament in 2014.

== Early years ==
Heatley was born in Whangārei. Before entering politics, Heatley completed a master's degree with Honours in Horticultural Engineering at Massey University. He has undertaken short-term study and work as a volunteer with an international relief agency on a hospital ship. He was an agricultural engineer in the dairy industry, surveying and designing farm buildings, land drainage and irrigation systems. He authored two published environmental engineering manuals. He is currently a Fellow of the Institution of Professional Engineers New Zealand (IPENZ).

== Member of Parliament ==
New Zealand Parliament
Years	Term	Electorate	List	Party
1999–2002	46th	Whangarei	42	National
2002–2005	47th	Whangarei	31	National
2005–2008	48th	Whangarei	22	National
2008– 2011	49th	Whangarei	22	National
2011–2014	50th	Whangarei	15	National

From the 1999 election until his retirement at the 2014 election, he was the MP for the Whangarei electorate. In Opposition, Heatley was a member of Parliament's Primary Production Committee, Regulations Review Committee and Transport and Industrial Relations Committee and has been National's spokesman on Forestry, Fisheries, Regional Development, Early Childhood Education and Energy.

He became Minister of Housing and Minister of Fisheries in the Fifth National Government in 2008 and remained Minister of Housing and became Minister of Energy and Resources in 2011, the beginning of the Government's second term.

In 2009 he introduced the Unit Titles Bill, modernising the 1972 legislation that regulates the way apartment blocks and multi-unit developments are managed. The Act came into force in April 2010. He also introduced the Residential Tenancies Amendment Bill to update existing rental laws and extend them to cover tenants in boarding houses not previously having protection. The legislation was passed in 2010.

Following 'errors' found in his expense reports, he resigned all portfolio positions in February 2010. He was reinstated to his ministerial portfolios the following month after a report which cleared him of any deliberate wrongdoing.

In 2011 he imposed change to the way Housing New Zealand delivered state housing including introducing a 'reviewable tenancy' that put an end to a 70-year 'state house for life' principle. A one-year suspension period to prevent anti-social tenants from reapplying for a state house, measures to prevent fraud and a commitment to insulate every state house and resource third sector providers of social housing also came into force.

Heatley's fisheries portfolio role was renamed from April 2010. As Minister of Fisheries and Aquaculture, in 2010 Heatley introduced the Aquaculture Legislation Amendment Bill (No 3) to streamline consenting, help manage competing demand for coastal space, and to deliver on the Maori Commercial Aquaculture Settlement to iwi. The legislation was passed in 2011. Together with then Labour Minister, Kate Wilkinson, he initiated a Ministerial Inquiry into the operation of Foreign Charter Vessels (FCVs) in New Zealand's EEZ. This followed allegations of the failure of some FCVs to provide for proper crew working conditions and vessel safety standards. Heatley, as Minister of Fisheries and Aquaculture, was succeeded by David Carter as Minister of Primary Industries following the 2011 post-election cabinet reshuffle. The inquiry was concluded in 2012 and the Fisheries (Foreign Charter Vessels and Other Matters) Bill was tabled later that year.

In December 2011 Heatley became Minister of Energy and Resources. In 2012 he introduced the Crown Minerals (Permitting and Crown Land) Bill amending the Crown Minerals Act 1991 to 'promote', not simply manage, exploration and production of oil, gas and mineral resources. The legislation created a two-tiered permit system for the more complex, higher-return petroleum and mineral activities and the lower-return small business and hobby mineral operations. Amendments were also included in response to the report of the Royal Commission on the Pike River Coal Mine disaster. The legislation was passed in 2013. In February 2012, he introduced a new 'block offer' process for awarding oil and gas exploration permit areas across New Zealand, including in its EEZ. Blocks on offer are confirmed following consultation with iwi and local authorities and a competitive tender is undertaken to finally allocate permits. This replaced a 'priority in time' process.

On 22 January 2013 Cabinet reshuffle, Heatley lost his ministerial portfolio Energy and Resources to Simon Bridges and Housing to Nick Smith.

== Post-ministerial career ==
On 31 January 2013 Heatley was granted the right to retain the title of The Honourable for life in recognition of his term as a Member of the Executive Council of New Zealand. Hon Phil Heatley was a member of the Parliament's Social Services Committee (2013–2014) and its Local Government and Environment Committee (2013–2014). In early November 2013 he announced he would be retiring from politics at the 2014 general election to "move on to fresh challenges and opportunities in the private sector". In September 2015 he joined the Northland Regional Council.

New Zealand Parliament
Preceded by John Banks	Member of Parliament for Whangarei; 1999–2014	Succeeded by Shane Reti
Political offices
Preceded by Maryan Street	Minister of Housing; 2008–2010; 2010–2013	Succeeded by Maurice Williamson (acting)
Preceded by Maurice Williamson (acting)	Minister of Housing; 2008–2010; 2010–2013	Succeeded by Nick Smith
Preceded by Jim Anderton	Minister of Fisheries; 2008–2010	Ministry merged
New title new Ministry	Minister of Fisheries and Aquaculture; 2010–2011	Ministry merged
Preceded by Gerry Brownlee	Minister of Energy and Resources; 2011–2013	Succeeded by Simon Bridges
