= Portland, New Zealand =

Portland
- Interactive map of Portland
- Coordinates: 35°47′47″S 174°19′29″E
- Country: New Zealand
- Region: Northland Region
- District: Whangarei District
- Ward: Bream Bay Ward
- Electorates: Whangārei; Te Tai Tokerau

Government
  - Territorial Authority: Whangarei District Council
  - Regional council: Northland Regional Council
  - Mayor of Whangārei: Ken Couper
  - Whangārei MP: Shane Reti
  - Te Tai Tokerau MP: Mariameno Kapa-Kingi

Area
  - Total: 12.12 km^{2} (4.68 sq mi)

Population (2023 Census)
  - Total: 483
  - Density: 39.9/km^{2} (103/sq mi)

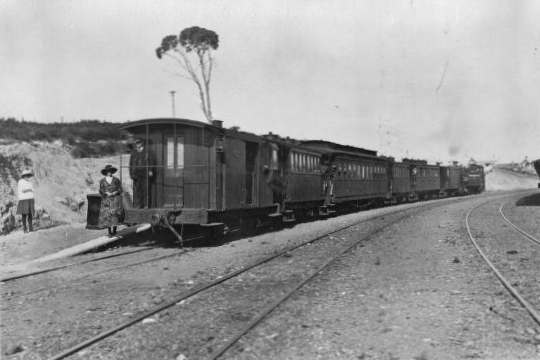
A train stopped on the North Auckland Line in 1923

Portland is a locality on the western side of Whangārei Harbour in Northland, New Zealand. Whangārei is about 10 km to the north. Tikorangi is a hill to the west with a summit 161 m above sea level.

The major industry is Portland Cement, which is New Zealand's largest cement manufacturer. It has a specialised loading dock on the harbour, and quarries Tikorangi for lime.

== History ==
The Portland Cement Works, which started on Limestone Island in Whangārei Harbour in 1885, moved to Portland in 1916. The Cement works is now owned by Golden Bay Cement, a division of Fletcher Building.

Dominion Cement built a mile-long pier of disused tram rails in 1913.

The town had a railway station on the North Auckland Line from 1918 to 1975.

== Demographics ==
Portland is in two SA1 statistical areas which cover 12.12 km^{2} (4.68 sq mi). The SA1 areas are part of the larger Otaika-Portland statistical area.

Historical population
Year	Pop.	±% p.a.
2006	399	—
2013	333	−2.55%
2018	441	+5.78%
2023	483	+1.84%
The 2006 population is for a smaller area of 11.96 km^{2} Source:

Portland had a population of 483 in the 2023 New Zealand census, an increase of 42 people (9.5%) since the 2018 census, and an increase of 150 people (45.0%) since the 2013 census. There were 246 males and 237 females in 141 dwellings. 3.1% of people identified as LGBTIQ+. There were 99 people (20.5%) aged under 15 years, 102 (21.1%) aged 15 to 29, 216 (44.7%) aged 30 to 64, and 60 (12.4%) aged 65 or older.

People could identify as more than one ethnicity. The results were 80.7% European (Pākehā), 42.9% Māori, 5.6% Pasifika, 0.6% Asian, and 1.2% other, which includes people giving their ethnicity as "New Zealander". English was spoken by 95.7%, Māori language by 7.5%, and other languages by 3.1%. No language could be spoken by 2.5% (e.g. too young to talk). The percentage of people born overseas was 9.9, compared with 28.8% nationally.

Religious affiliations were 27.3% Christian, 3.1% Māori religious beliefs, 0.6% New Age, 0.6% Jewish, and 0.6% other religions. People who answered that they had no religion were 62.7%, and 4.3% of people did not answer the census question.

Of those at least 15 years old, 42 (10.9%) people had a bachelor's or higher degree, 225 (58.6%) had a post-high school certificate or diploma, and 99 (25.8%) people exclusively held high school qualifications. 30 people (7.8%) earned over $100,000 compared to 12.1% nationally. The employment status of those at least 15 was that 183 (47.7%) people were employed full-time, 57 (14.8%) were part-time, and 15 (3.9%) were unemployed.

== Education ==
Portland School is a coeducational contributing primary (years 1–6) school with a roll of 102 students as of March 2026.
