= Hikurangi =

Settlement in Northland, New Zealand

- Town
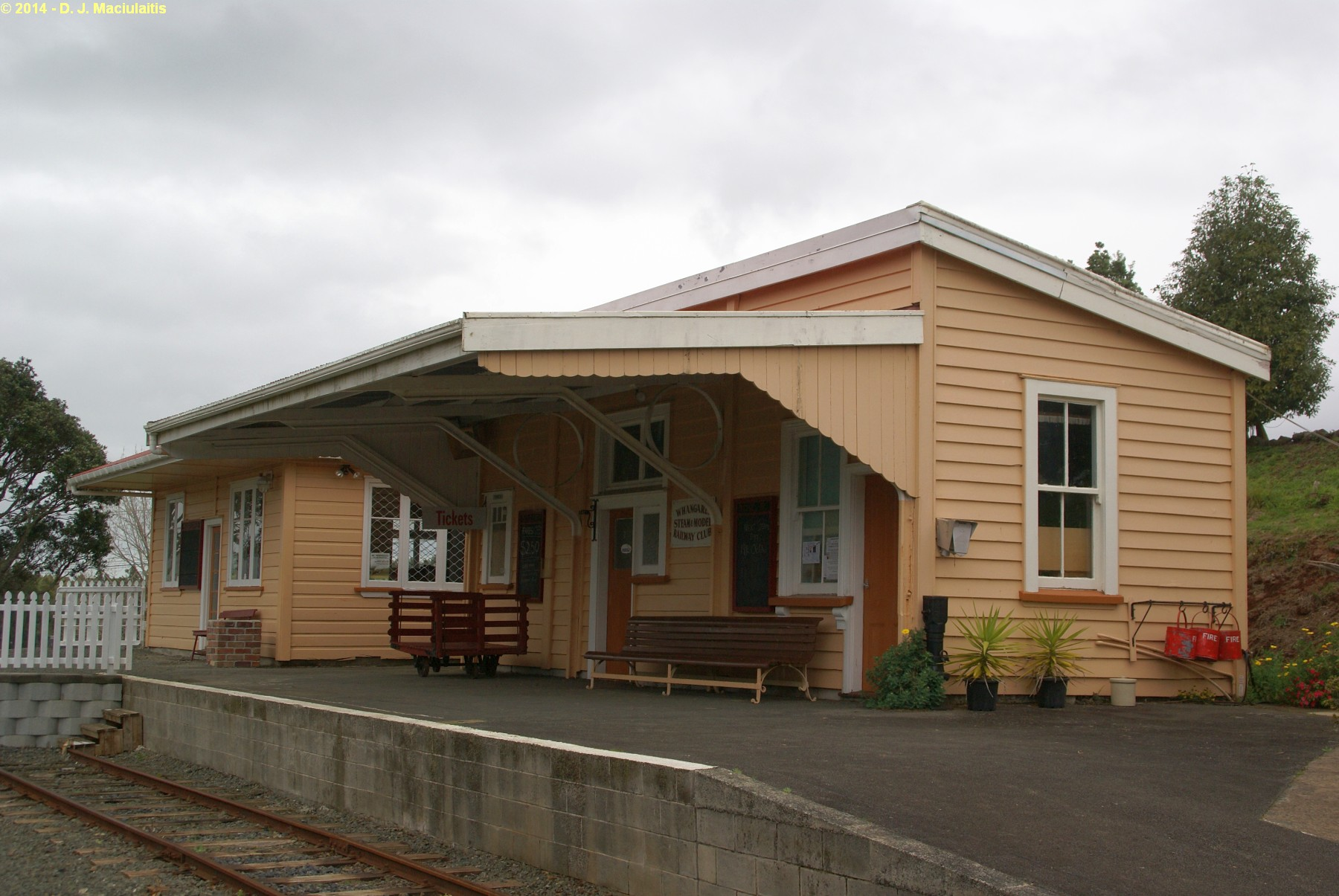
- Hikurangi station
- Interactive map of Hikurangi
- Coordinates: 35°35′54″S 174°17′12″E
- Country: New Zealand
- Region: Northland Region
- District: Whangarei District
- Ward: Hikurangi-Coastal Ward
- Electorates: Whangārei; Te Tai Tokerau

Government
  - Territorial Authority: Whangarei District Council
  - Regional council: Northland Regional Council
  - Mayor of Whangārei: Ken Couper
  - Whangārei MP: Shane Reti
  - Te Tai Tokerau MP: Mariameno Kapa-Kingi

Area
  - Total: 4.00 km^{2} (1.54 sq mi)

Population (June 2025)
  - Total: 1,640
  - Density: 410/km^{2} (1,060/sq mi)

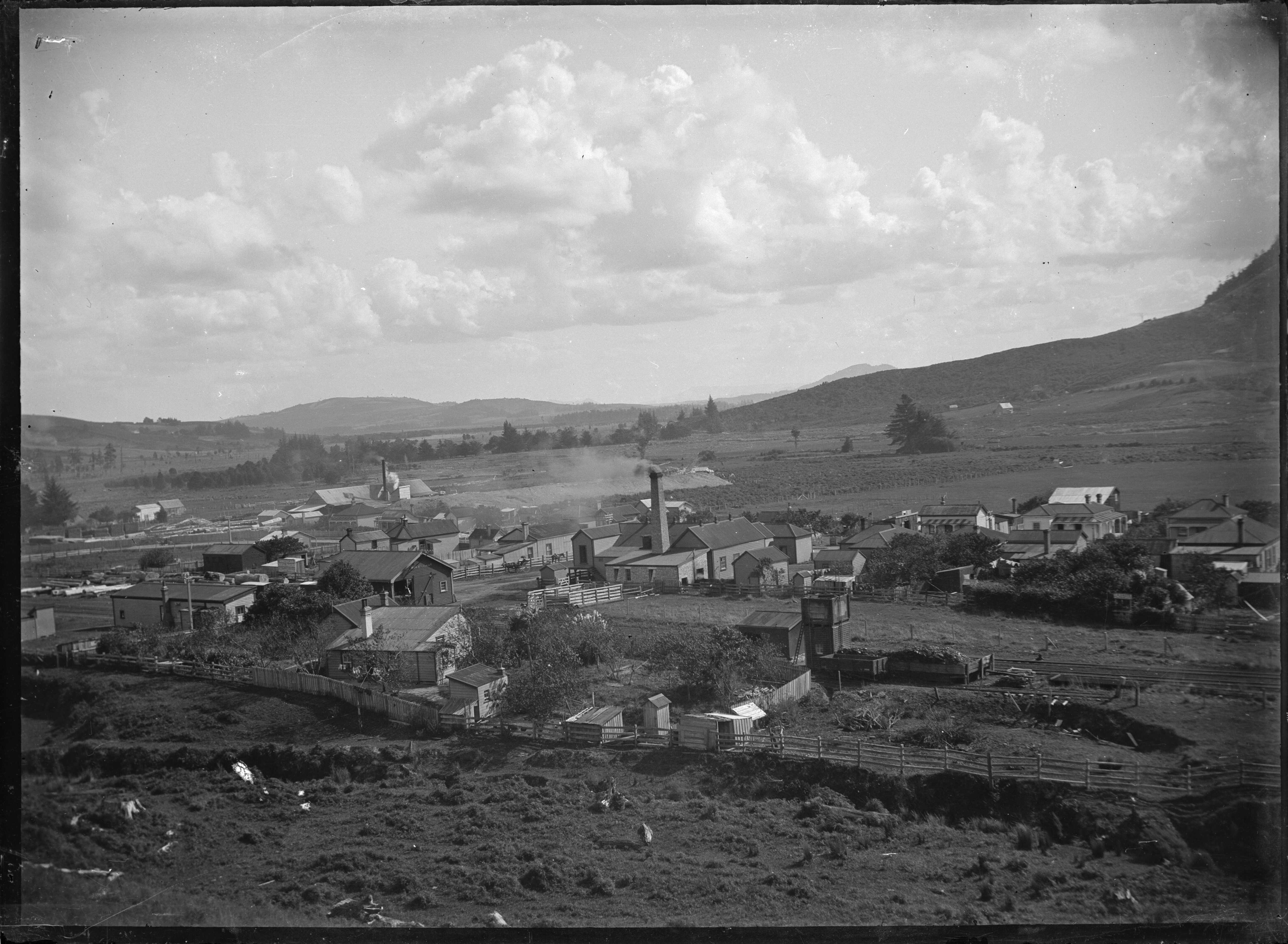
View over Hikurangi, 1911

Hikurangi is a settlement in Northland, New Zealand. The city of Whangārei is 17 kilometres (11 mi) to the south, and Kawakawa is 39 kilometres (24 mi) northwest. The Glenbervie Forest is southeast of the settlement. State Highway 1 once passed through the town, but now bypasses it to the west. Mount Hikurangi is a volcanic dome rising 365 metres (1,198 ft) to the west of the town. It is 1.2 million years old, and part of the Harbour Fault which also includes Parakiore, near Kamo, and Parihaka in Whangarei.

Hikurangi is a service town for the local dairy industry.

== History ==
An area of 12,000 acres (48.6 km^{2}) of land at Hikurangi was purchased from local Maori by the District Commissioner of Lands in 1862. The land was considered desirable because it contained mature timber and high quality flax, and transport routes were established. The area became a timber milling centre with the establishment of a road to Whangarei in 1875, and the first of several sawmills soon after. Kauri gum-diggers were also active in the area.

The town grew around local coal mines, which opened in 1890. The North Auckland railway line from Whangarei reached Hikurangi in 1894. 4.2 million tons of coal were extracted. Flooding was a problem for the mines. During a nationwide coal-miners' strike in 1931, the Wilson Colliery Company closed their mine and deliberately flooded it. The miners formed a company and bought the mine, but it closed two years later because there were few orders for coal during the Great Depression. Three brothers were killed by black damp at one mine in 1933. The last mine closed in 1971.

The Hikurangi Co-operative Dairy Company was formed in 1904. It established a dairy factory and operated a fleet of trucks to collect cream but also to deliver fertiliser and general goods to farmers. The factory was replaced by a new building in the 1950s. The company amalgamated with the Northland Co-operative Dairy Company in 1985, and the factory closed.

Six teenagers were killed in 1930 when a train hit a bus.

The Hikurangi association football team competed in the early years of the Chatham Cup.

In June 1926 a mine flooding left 150 employees idle, then unemployed.

Hikurangi was administered by the Hikurangi District Roads Board until the formation of the Hikurangi Town Board in 1908. The Board became the Hikurangi Town Council in 1955. In 1989, they amalgamated with the Whangarei City Council and Whangarei County Council to form the Whangarei District Council.

Limestone has been quarried at Hikurangi since the early 20th century. The quarry still supplies limestone to the cement works at Portland.

== Demographics ==
Hikurangi covers 4.00 km^{2} (1.54 sq mi) and had an estimated population of 1,640 as of June 2025, with a population density of 410 people per km^{2}.

Historical population
Year	Pop.	±% p.a.
2006	1,419	—
2013	1,410	−0.09%
2018	1,617	+2.78%
2023	1,557	−0.75%

Hikurangi had a population of 1,557 in the 2023 New Zealand census, a decrease of 60 people (−3.7%) since the 2018 census, and an increase of 147 people (10.4%) since the 2013 census. There were 789 males and 765 females in 522 dwellings. 2.3% of people identified as LGBTIQ+. The median age was 32.5 years (compared with 38.1 years nationally). There were 423 people (27.2%) aged under 15 years, 297 (19.1%) aged 15 to 29, 645 (41.4%) aged 30 to 64, and 195 (12.5%) aged 65 or older.

People could identify as more than one ethnicity. The results were 72.1% European (Pākehā); 48.9% Māori; 5.2% Pasifika; 2.7% Asian; 0.2% Middle Eastern, Latin American and African New Zealanders (MELAA); and 2.3% other, which includes people giving their ethnicity as "New Zealander". English was spoken by 96.9%, Māori language by 11.6%, Samoan by 0.6%, and other languages by 3.7%. No language could be spoken by 2.3% (e.g. too young to talk). New Zealand Sign Language was known by 0.6%. The percentage of people born overseas was 10.4, compared with 28.8% nationally.

Religious affiliations were 25.2% Christian, 1.0% Hindu, 4.0% Māori religious beliefs, 0.8% New Age, 0.2% Jewish, and 0.6% other religions. People who answered that they had no religion were 60.3%, and 8.3% of people did not answer the census question.

Of those at least 15 years old, 108 (9.5%) people had a bachelor's or higher degree, 702 (61.9%) had a post-high school certificate or diploma, and 297 (26.2%) people exclusively held high school qualifications. The median income was $39,100, compared with $41,500 nationally. 33 people (2.9%) earned over $100,000 compared to 12.1% nationally. The employment status of those at least 15 was that 585 (51.6%) people were employed full-time, 138 (12.2%) were part-time, and 45 (4.0%) were unemployed.

== Education ==
Hikurangi School is a coeducational full primary (years 1-8) school with a roll of 177 students as of July 2026. The first public school in Hikurangi opened in 1883 at View Road until the school was demolished in 1922. The school was built on the current site at Valley Road in 1922-1923 and has been enlarged numerous times over the years. The site of the former school on View Road was sold to Mr and Mrs Robert Cherry. They got their house built on it in 1923 and it has been designated a Group II historic place. The builder was Mr Watts from Whangārei.
