= Lloyd Budd (politician) =

New Zealand business executive and politician

Personal details
- Born: 1982 or 1983 (age 42–43) Whangārei, New Zealand
- Party: National
- Occupation: Member of the 55th New Zealand Parliament, Business executive,

Lloyd Budd (born 1982 or 1983) is a New Zealand business executive and politician. He was selected in May 2026 as the New Zealand National Party candidate for the Whangārei electorate at the 2026 New Zealand general election.

== Political career ==
New Zealand Parliament
Years	Term	Electorate	List	Party
2026–present	55th	Whangārei	60	National

In May 2026, Budd was selected by local National Party members to stand as the party's candidate for the Whangārei electorate at the 2026 New Zealand general election, scheduled for 7 November 2026. He succeeds Shane Reti, who represented the electorate for twelve years as both a Member of Parliament and Cabinet Minister before announcing his retirement from politics. On election night Budd received 15,757 votes, beating Labour Party candidate Gary Payinda.

He was ranked 60th on the National Party list.

== Early life and education ==
Budd was born and raised in Whangārei, where his family has had roots for generations. He attended Whangārei Primary School, Whangārei Intermediate School, and Whangārei Boys' High School.

== Career ==
Budd has worked as a real estate professional for more than 25 years, including a decade with Bayleys. He rose to become Chief Executive Officer of Bayleys Auckland. In 2018, he was awarded the title of Property Professional of the Year.

His broader career includes time working in the Middle East and leading a family business across Auckland. He has also completed a leadership programme through Harvard University Executive Education.

== Community involvement ==
Budd is involved with several charitable organisations, including the Keystone Trust, Steven Adams Pathways, and LegaSea. He is married with two children.
