= Whangārei (electorate) =

- Single-member general constituency for the New Zealand House of Representatives
- Interactive map of boundaries from the 2026 election
- Formation: 1972
- Region: Northland
- Character: Urban
- Term: 3 years

Member for Whangārei
- Lloyd Budd since 7 November 2026
- Party: National
Party vote distribution

Whangārei (formerly Whangarei) is a New Zealand parliamentary electorate that was first created for the 1972 election. The electorate is usually a reasonably safe National seat, and was held for long periods by John Banks (1981–1999) and Phil Heatley (1999–2014), before being won in the 2014 election by Shane Reti. In the 2020 election Reti narrowly lost the seat to Labour's Emily Henderson. Reti would reclaim the seat at the 2023 election with a huge majority.

== Population centres ==
Since the 1969 election, the number of electorates in the South Island was fixed at 25, with continued faster population growth in the North Island leading to an increase in the number of general electorates. There were 84 electorates for the 1969 election, and the 1972 electoral redistribution saw three additional general seats created for the North Island, bringing the total number of electorates to 87. Together with increased urbanisation in Christchurch and Nelson, the changes proved very disruptive to existing electorates. In the South Island, three electorates were abolished, and three electorates were newly created. In the North Island, five electorates were abolished, two electorates were recreated, and six electorates were newly created (including Whangārei).

Map of boundaries at the 2020 and 2023 general elections

The boundaries of the Whangārei electorate were adjusted for the 1999 election; before then, the electorate bordered onto the Kaipara Harbour. Redistributions in 2002, 2007, and 2013/14 did not change the boundaries further. Changes ahead of the 2020 election moved Poroti and Maungakaramea into the Northland electorate and also changed the electorate's name from Whangarei to Whangārei. Redistributions for the 2026 general election saw the electorate extend northwards to the Whangaruru harbour.

The electorate includes the following population centres:

- Whangārei
- Hikurangi
- Ruakaka
- Whananaki
- Ōakura
- Whangaruru

It extends from Whangaruru in the north to Ruatangata and Maungatapere in the west and Waipu and Langs Beach in the south.

== History ==
The electorate was created for the 1972 election. It was won by the Labour Party in that election, but was then held by the National Party until 2020. Phil Heatley held it from 1999 until he retired in 2014. Shane Reti stood for National in the 2014 election and had a large margin over Labour's Kelly Ellis.

=== Members of Parliament ===
Unless otherwise stated, all MPs terms began and ended at a general election.

Key

Labour	National
NZ First	ACT

Election	Winner
1972 election	Murray Smith
1975 election	John Elliott
1978 election	John Elliott
1981 election	John Banks
1984 election	John Banks
1987 election	John Banks
1990 election	John Banks
1993 election	John Banks
1996 election	John Banks
1999 election	Phil Heatley
2002 election	Phil Heatley
2005 election	Phil Heatley
2008 election	Phil Heatley
2011 election	Phil Heatley
2014 election	Shane Reti
2017 election	Shane Reti
2020 election	Emily Henderson
2023 election	Shane Reti

=== List MPs ===
Members of Parliament elected from party lists in elections where that person also unsuccessfully contested the Whangārei electorate. Unless otherwise stated, all MPs terms began and ended at general elections.

Election	Winner
1996 election	Brian Donnelly
1996 election	Muriel Newman
1999 election	Brian Donnelly
1999 election	Muriel Newman
2002 election	Brian Donnelly
2002 election	Muriel Newman
2005 election	Brian Donnelly ^{1}
2014 election	Pita Paraone
2017 election	Shane Jones
2020 election	Shane Reti

^{1}Donnelly resigned in February 2008 when appointed High Commissioner to the Cook Islands

== Election results ==
=== 2026 election ===
The next election will be held on 7 November 2026. Candidates for Whangārei are listed at Candidates in the 2026 New Zealand general election by electorate § Whangārei. Official results will be available after 27 November 2026.

=== 2023 election ===
2023 general election: Whangārei
Notes:	Blue background denotes the winner of the electorate vote. Pink background denotes a candidate elected from their party list. Yellow background denotes an electorate win by a list member, or other incumbent. A ✓ or ✗ denotes status of any incumbent, win or lose respectively.						
Party	Candidate	Votes	%	±%	Party votes	%	±%
National	Shane Reti	20,843	48.77	+8.95	16,441	37.92	+11.73
Labour	Angie Warren-Clark	9,419	22.04	−18.77	9,698	22.37	−24.91
NZ First	Gavin Benney	5,371	12.56	+9.06	5,673	13.08	+7.96
Green	Rick Bazeley	2,680	6.27	+2.53	4,075	9.40	+3.22
ACT	Susy Bretherton	1,222	2.85	−2.08	3,954	9.12	+0.88
NZ Loyal	Janita Andrews	1006	2.35	+2.35	905	2.08	+2.08
Te Pāti Māori	Eru Kapa-Kingi	859	2.01	+1.67	591	1.36	+1.02
DemocracyNZ	Diana Burgess	578	1.35	+1.35	352	0.81	+0.81
Legalise Cannabis	Jeni de Jonge	612	1.43	+0.06	249	0.57	−0.05
Independent	Fiona Green	140	0.32	+0.32			
Opportunities					730	1.68	+0.18
NewZeal					336	0.77	+0.77
Freedoms NZ					110	0.25	+0.25
Animal Justice					77	0.17	+0.17
New Conservatives					55	0.12	−1.72
New Nation					35	0.08	+0.08
Women's Rights					35	0.08	+0.08
Leighton Baker Party					32	0.07	+0.07
Informal votes		394			286		
Total valid votes		43,124			43,634		
National gain from Labour	Majority	11,424	26.73				

=== 2020 election ===
2020 general election: Whangārei
Notes:	Blue background denotes the winner of the electorate vote. Pink background denotes a candidate elected from their party list. Yellow background denotes an electorate win by a list member, or other incumbent. A ✓ or ✗ denotes status of any incumbent, win or lose respectively.						
Party	Candidate	Votes	%	±%	Party votes	%	±%
Labour	Emily Henderson	17,823	40.81	+21.62	20,942	47.28	+15.75
National	✗ Shane Reti	17,392	39.82	−6.47	11,602	26.19	−18.89
ACT	David Seymour	2,153	4.93	+4.47	3,650	8.24	+7.76
Green	Moea Armstrong	1,635	3.74	−8.29	2,738	6.18	+0.50
NZ First	David Wilson	1,527	3.50	−15.41	2,268	5.12	−8.97
Opportunities	Ciara Swords	705	1.61	—	663	1.50	−0.24
Advance NZ	Christopher Wetere	654	1.50	—	686	1.55	—
Legalise Cannabis	Jennifer de Jonge	597	1.37	—	274	0.62	+0.29
New Conservative	Kerry Campbell	544	1.25	+0.86	814	1.84	+1.57
Social Credit	Chris Leitch	356	0.82	−1.61	133	0.30	+0.13
ONE	Daniel Watts	287	0.66	—	249	0.56	—
Māori Party					149	0.34	+0.09
Vision NZ					44	0.10	—
Outdoors					42	0.09	+0.02
Sustainable NZ					23	0.05	—
TEA					10	0.02	—
Heartland					4	0.01	—
Informal votes		611			297		
Total valid votes		44,284			44,588		
Labour gain from National	Majority	431	0.97				

=== 2017 election ===
2017 general election: Whangarei
Notes:	Blue background denotes the winner of the electorate vote. Pink background denotes a candidate elected from their party list. Yellow background denotes an electorate win by a list member, or other incumbent. A ✓ or ✗ denotes status of any incumbent, win or lose respectively.						
Party	Candidate	Votes	%	±%	Party votes	%	±%
National	✓ Shane Reti	18,734	45.8	−9.27	18,572	44.9	−5.18
Labour	Tony John Savage	7,767	19.0	−0.01	12,993	31.4	+13.61
NZ First	Shane Jones	7,651	18.7	+10.64	5,804	14.01	+0.65
Green	Ash Holwell	4,868	11.9	+3.24	2,342	5.65	−4.12
Democrats	Chris Leitch	994	2.43	−0.25	71	0.17	−0.14
ACT	Robin Grieve	188	0.46	−0.32	198	0.48	−0.05
Conservative	Jim Taylor	158	0.39	−2.30	113	0.27	−4.94
Independent	Marie Minhinnick	110	0.27	−0.66			
Opportunities					716	1.73	–
Legalise Cannabis					135	0.33	−0.17
Māori Party					101	0.24	−0.29
Mana					43	0.1	−0.94 (Note: 2017 Mana Party swing is relative to the votes for Internet-Mana in 2014; it shared a party list with the Internet Party in the 2014 election)
Ban 1080					39	0.09	−0.01
Outdoors					28	0.07	–
United Future					19	0.046	−0.47
People's Party					18	0.043	–
Internet					10	0.02	−1.02 (Note: 2017 Internet Party swing is relative to the votes for Internet-Mana in 2014; it shared a party list with Mana Party in the 2014 election)
Informal votes		396			204		
Total valid votes		40,866			41,406		
National hold	Majority	10,967	26.84	−9.22			

=== 2014 election ===
2014 general election: Whangarei
Notes:	Blue background denotes the winner of the electorate vote. Pink background denotes a candidate elected from their party list. Yellow background denotes an electorate win by a list member, or other incumbent. A ✓ or ✗ denotes status of any incumbent, win or lose respectively.						
Party	Candidate	Votes	%	±%	Party votes	%	±%
National	Shane Reti	20,111	55.07	−4.11	18,503	50.08	−0.59
Labour	Kelly Ellis	6,942	19.01	−3.43	6,575	17.79	−2.54
Green	Paul Doherty	3,163	8.66	−0.17	3,611	9.77	−0.87
NZ First	Pita Paraone	2,944	8.06	+3.60	4,936	13.36	+3.68
Conservative	Don Nightingale	984	2.69	−0.69	1,925	5.21	+0.99
Democrats	Chris Leitch	978	2.68	+2.26	116	0.31	+0.07
Internet	David Currin	341	0.93	+0.93			
Māori Party	Anaru Kaipo	300	0.82	+0.82	196	0.53	−0.08
ACT	Robin Grieve	285	0.78	−0.22	205	0.55	−1.18
Focus	Les King	136	0.37	+0.37	34	0.09	+0.09
Internet Mana					386	1.04	+0.35
Legalise Cannabis					183	0.50	−0.03
United Future					93	0.25	−0.27
Ban 1080					38	0.10	+0.10
Civilian					16	0.04	+0.04
Independent Coalition					15	0.04	+0.04
Informal votes		336			117		
Total valid votes		36,520			36,949		
National hold	Majority	13,169	36.06	−0.68			

=== 2011 election ===
2011 general election: Whangarei
Notes:	Blue background denotes the winner of the electorate vote. Pink background denotes a candidate elected from their party list. Yellow background denotes an electorate win by a list member, or other incumbent. A ✓ or ✗ denotes status of any incumbent, win or lose respectively.						
Party	Candidate	Votes	%	±%	Party votes	%	±%
National	✓ Phil Heatley	20,049	59.18	−4.98	17,486	50.67	+0.63
Labour	Pat Newman	7,602	22.44	−0.92	7,017	20.33	−8.27
Green	Rick Bazeley	2,993	8.83	+1.23	3,673	10.64	+4.65
NZ First	Pita Paraone	1,512	4.46	+4.46	3,340	9.68	+3.52
Conservative	Ross Craig	1,146	3.38	+3.38	1,457	4.22	+4.22
ACT	Robin Grieve	338	1.00	+0.15	596	1.73	−2.07
Democrats	Edgar Kenneth Goodhue	142	0.42	−0.08	84	0.24	+0.06
Libertarianz	Helen Hughes	97	0.29	+0.12	31	0.09	+0.04
Mana					238	0.69	+0.69
Māori Party					212	0.61	−0.30
Legalise Cannabis					184	0.53	+0.07
United Future					180	0.52	−0.19
Alliance					14	0.04	−0.01
Informal votes		654			287		
Total valid votes		33,879			34,512		
National hold	Majority	12,447	36.74	−4.06			

Electorate (as at 26 November 2011): 46,511

=== 2008 election ===
2008 general election: Whangarei
Notes:	Blue background denotes the winner of the electorate vote. Pink background denotes a candidate elected from their party list. Yellow background denotes an electorate win by a list member, or other incumbent. A ✓ or ✗ denotes status of any incumbent, win or lose respectively.						
Party	Candidate	Votes	%	±%	Party votes	%	±%
National	✓ Phil Heatley	23,056	64.16		18,252	50.04	
Labour	Paul Chalmers	8,393	23.36		10,433	28.60	
Green	Paul Doherty	2,731	7.60		2,187	6.00	
Progressive	Viv Shepherd	636	1.77		531	1.46	
ACT	Thomas John McClelland	304	0.85		1,385	3.80	
RAM	Martin Kaipo	281	0.78		25	0.07	
Democrats	Edgar Kenneth Goodhue	179	0.50		66	0.18	
Independent	Simon Vallings	113	0.31				
United Future	Maureen Gunston	107	0.30		260	0.71	
Independent	Don Hedges	74	0.21				
Libertarianz	Helen Hughes	61	0.17		18	0.05	
NZ First					2,246	6.16	
Māori Party					333	0.91	
Bill and Ben					231	0.63	
Legalise Cannabis					169	0.46	
Kiwi					167	0.46	
Family Party					128	0.35	
Alliance					17	0.05	
Workers Party					13	0.04	
Pacific					12	0.03	
RONZ					3	0.01	
Informal votes		413			240		
Total valid votes		35,935			36,476		
National hold	Majority	14,663	40.80				

=== 2005 election ===
2005 general election: Whangarei
Notes:	Blue background denotes the winner of the electorate vote. Pink background denotes a candidate elected from their party list. Yellow background denotes an electorate win by a list member, or other incumbent. A ✓ or ✗ denotes status of any incumbent, win or lose respectively.						
Party	Candidate	Votes	%	±%	Party votes	%	±%
National	✓ Phil Heatley	18,900	53.81	+10.56	15,333	43.11	
Labour	Paul Chalmers	9,811	27.93	−5.27	12,884	36.22	
NZ First	Brian Donnelly	2,983	8.49	−3.31	3,217	9.04	
Green	Moea Armstrong	1,240	3.53		1,648	4.63	
ACT	Muriel Newman	1,067	3.04		707	1.99	
Māori Party	Rangi Ngāti Huna Tahiao	384	1.09		264	0.74	
Progressive	Viv Shepherd	311	0.89		409	1.15	
Destiny	Tony Ford	178	0.51		240	0.67	
United Future	Craig Hunt	168	0.48		637	1.79	
Libertarianz	Helen Hughes	80	0.23		39	0.11	
Legalise Cannabis					81	0.23	
Christian Heritage					46	0.13	
Democrats					23	0.06	
Alliance					19	0.05	
RONZ					6	0.02	
99 MP					4	0.01	
Direct Democracy					4	0.01	
One NZ					4	0.01	
Family Rights					3	0.01	
Informal votes		243			117		
Total valid votes		35,122			35,568		
National hold	Majority	9,089	25.88	+15.88			

=== 2002 election ===
2002 general election: Whangarei
Notes:	Blue background denotes the winner of the electorate vote. Pink background denotes a candidate elected from their party list. Yellow background denotes an electorate win by a list member, or other incumbent. A ✓ or ✗ denotes status of any incumbent, win or lose respectively.						
Party	Candidate	Votes	%	±%	Party votes	%	±%
National	✓ Phil Heatley	13,829	43.03		7,493	23.17	
Labour	David Shearer	10,615	33.03		11,374	35.17	
NZ First	Brian Donnelly	3,774	11.74		5,008	15.48	
ACT	Muriel Newman	1,297	4.03		2,623	8.11	
Green	Calvin Green	1,180	3.60		2,111	6.52	
Christian Heritage	Rod Harris	521	1.62		807	2.49	
United Future	Gary Phillips	268	0.83		1,483	4.58	
Alliance	Ticia Cutforth	239	0.74		351	1.08	
Progressive	David Wilson	156	0.48		394	1.21	
Libertarianz	Helen Hughes	97	0.30				
ORNZ					383	1.18	
Legalise Cannabis					143	0.44	
One NZ					23	0.07	
Mana Māori					11	0.03	
NMP					3	0.009	
Informal votes		159			125		
Total valid votes		32,135			32,332		
National hold	Majority	3,214	10.00				

=== 1999 election ===
Refer to Candidates in the New Zealand general election 1999 by electorate#Whangarei for a list of candidates.

=== 1993 election ===
1993 general election: Whangarei
Party	Candidate	Votes	%	±%
National	John Banks	6,507	34.46	−25.56
Labour	Mark Furey	4,920	26.06	
NZ First	Brian Donnelly	4,212	22.31	
Alliance	Kay Brittenden	2,649	14.03	
Christian Heritage	Craig Smith	275	1.45	
McGillicuddy Serious	Paull Gordon Cooke	152	0.80	
Natural Law	Helen Treadwell	75	0.39	
Independent	Paul Gourlie	94	0.49	
Majority		1,587	8.40	−28.28
Turnout		18,878	82.07	−0.76
Registered electors		23,002		

=== 1990 election ===
1990 general election: Whangarei
Party	Candidate	Votes	%	±%
National	John Banks	11,191	60.02	+3.95
Labour	Edna Tait	4,352	23.34	−13.44
Green	Derek Heath Keene	1,801	9.65	
Social Credit	Joyce Ryan	602	3.22	
NewLabour	Douglas Alexander Ewen	419	2.24	
Independent	Les Gray	175	0.93	
Democrats	Mary Schreurs	105	0.56	
Majority		6,839	36.68	+17.39
Turnout		18,645	82.83	−4.33
Registered electors		22,508		

=== 1987 election ===
1987 general election: Whangarei
Party	Candidate	Votes	%	±%
National	John Banks	10,718	56.07	+11.54
Labour	Edna Tait	7,031	36.78	
Democrats	Chris Leitch	1,364	7.13	−4.47
Majority		3,687	19.29	+10.19
Turnout		19,113	87.16	−5.24
Registered electors		21,928		

=== 1984 election ===
1984 general election: Whangarei
Party	Candidate	Votes	%	±%
National	John Banks	9,801	44.53	+4.34
Labour	Barbara Magner	7,798	35.43	
Social Credit	Chris Leitch	2,553	11.60	
NZ Party	Richard Kroon	1,809	8.22	
Mana Motuhake	Hana Maxwell	45	0.20	
Majority		2,003	9.10	+1.22
Turnout		22,006	92.40	+3.06
Registered electors		23,814		

=== 1981 election ===
1981 general election: Whangarei
Party	Candidate	Votes	%	±%
National	John Banks	8,884	40.19	
Labour	Maurice Penney	7,141	32.31	
Social Credit	Bill Fraser	6,075	27.48	
Majority		1,743	7.88	
Turnout		22,100	89.34	+12.61
Registered electors		24,735		

=== 1978 election ===
1978 general election: Whangarei
Party	Candidate	Votes	%	±%
National	John Elliott	8,184	38.84	−10.62
Labour	Colin Moyle	7,008	33.26	
Social Credit	Joyce Ryan	5,485	26.03	+15.99
Values	Alan Harvey	335	1.59	
Independent	Graham Frederick Lane	57	0.27	
Majority		1,176	5.58	−7.18
Turnout		21,069	76.73	−9.94
Registered electors		27,457		

=== 1975 election ===
1975 general election: Whangarei
Party	Candidate	Votes	%	±%
National	John Elliott	10,502	49.46	
Labour	Murray Smith	7,792	36.69	−11.92
Social Credit	Joyce Ryan	2,133	10.04	+0.93
Values	Margaret Crozier	805	3.79	
Majority		2,710	12.76	
Turnout		21,232	86.67	−3.48
Registered electors		24,495		

=== 1972 election ===
1972 general election: Whangarei
Party	Candidate	Votes	%	±%
Labour	Murray Smith	8,441	48.61	
National	Lawrence Carr	7,261	41.81	
Social Credit	Joyce Ryan	1,582	9.11	
Liberal Reform	G A Still	49	0.28	
New Democratic	B C Gaby	30	0.17	
Majority		1,180	6.79	
Turnout		17,363	90.15	
Registered electors		19,258		
