= Shane Reti =

New Zealand politician

The Honourable Shane Reti QSM MP
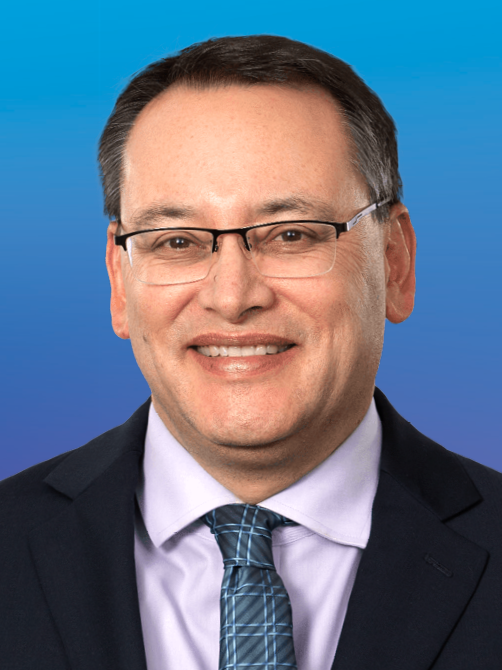
- Reti in 2023

15th Minister for Pacific Peoples
- In office 27 November 2023 – 7 April 2026
- Prime Minister: Christopher Luxon
- Preceded by: Barbara Edmonds
- Succeeded by: Paul Goldsmith

29th Minister of Science, Innovation and Technology
- In office 24 January 2025 – 7 April 2026
- Prime Minister: Christopher Luxon
- Preceded by: Judith Collins
- Succeeded by: Penny Simmonds

34th Minister of Statistics
- In office 24 January 2025 – 7 April 2026
- Prime Minister: Christopher Luxon
- Preceded by: Andrew Bayly
- Succeeded by: Scott Simpson

Minister of Universities
- In office 24 January 2025 – 7 April 2026
- Prime Minister: Christopher Luxon

44th Minister of Health
- In office 27 November 2023 – 24 January 2025
- Prime Minister: Christopher Luxon
- Preceded by: Ayesha Verrall
- Succeeded by: Simeon Brown

Member of the New Zealand Parliament for Whangārei
- Incumbent
- Assumed office 14 October 2023
- Preceded by: Emily Henderson
- In office 20 September 2014 – 17 October 2020
- Preceded by: Phil Heatley
- Succeeded by: Emily Henderson

18th Deputy Leader of the National Party
- In office 10 November 2020 – 30 November 2021
- Leader: Judith Collins
- Preceded by: Gerry Brownlee
- Succeeded by: Nicola Willis

Deputy Leader of the Opposition
- In office 10 November 2020 – 30 November 2021
- Leader: Judith Collins
- Preceded by: Gerry Brownlee
- Succeeded by: Nicola Willis

Member of the New Zealand Parliament for National Party list
- In office 17 October 2020 – 14 October 2023

Personal details
- Born: Shane Raymond Reti; 5 June 1963 (age 63) Hamilton, New Zealand
- Party: National Party
- Children: 3
- Profession: Politician; General Practitioner
- Website: https://shanereti.national.org.nz

Military service
- Allegiance: New Zealand
- Branch/service: New Zealand Army
- Years of service: 1983–1987
- Unit: Territorial Force

Shane Raymond Reti QSM MP (born 5 June 1963) is a New Zealand politician and a member of the New Zealand House of Representatives, and a Cabinet Minister with the roles of Minister for Pacific Peoples, Minister of Science, Innovation, and Technology, Minister of Universities and Minister of Statistics. He was first elected at the 2014 general election as the Member of Parliament (MP) for the Whangārei electorate. He is a member of the New Zealand National Party and served as its deputy leader from 10 November 2020 to 30 November 2021 including a period of five days as interim leader following the ousting of Judith Collins. He previously held the role of Minister of Health from 2023 to 2025.

== Early life and family ==
Born in Hamilton in 1963, Reti is of Māori descent, and has tribal affiliations to Ngāpuhi, Ngāti Hine, Ngāti Wai, Te Kapotai and Ngāti Maniapoto. He was educated at Hamilton Boys' High School and Minidoka County High School in Rupert, Idaho, United States. He then studied at the University of Waikato from 1981 to 1982 and the University of Auckland between 1982 and 1987 and in 1989, graduating from the latter with a Bachelor of Human Biology in 1985, MB ChB in 1987 and a Diploma in Obstetrics in 1989. He was also awarded a Diploma in Dermatological Science by the University of Wales, Cardiff in 1991.

Reti served in the Territorial Force from 1983 to 1987. He played badminton for Waikato between 1978 and 1982.

== Professional career ==
Reti worked as a general practitioner for 17 years. For seven years and three consecutive terms he served as a member of the Northland District Health Board. In the 2006 New Year Honours he was awarded a Queen's Service Medal for public services.

In 2007 Reti was awarded a NZ Harkness Fellowship to Harvard Medical School and moved to Massachusetts to work at Harvard University. Reti remained in Boston for six years and claims to have resisted offers by Beth Israel Deaconess Medical Center and Harvard Medical School to extend his stay.

Reti has continued to be a practising doctor during his time in parliament. In 2019 Reti was one of a team who administered the meningococcal vaccine at Hikurangi primary school after the local community raised money to buy the vaccine. In 2021 Reti travelled Northland administering COVID-19 vaccinations. In 2021 industry publication New Zealand Doctor indicated that having a doctor high up is important to the profession, announcing "Shane Reti is the first GP, and first medical practitioner, to become leader of the National Party".

== Fifth National Government, 2014–2017 ==
New Zealand Parliament
Years	Term	Electorate	List	Party
2014–2017	51st	Whangārei	60	National
2017–2020	52nd	Whangārei	45	National
2020–2023	53rd	List	5	National
2023–present	54th	Whangārei	4	National

Early in 2014, Reti won the National Party nomination in the safe Whangārei electorate against sitting list MP Paul Foster-Bell for the 2014 election. At the 2014 election, he had a large margin over Labour's Kelly Ellis.

During the Northland by-election, Reti was accused of bullying Alex Wright of the Pipiwai Titoki Advocacy group, a group campaigning to seal the "dusty and dangerous foresty roads" in Northland. Wright claimed that Reti rang her and told her to keep quiet until after the by-election or get nothing. Reti responded that he was attempting to help the group.

== In opposition, 2017–2023 ==
During the 2017 election, Reti was re-elected in Whangārei, defeating Labour candidate Tony John Savage by a margin of 10,967 votes.

Following the formation of the Labour-led coalition government, Reti became National's Associate Spokesperson for Health and Deputy Chaiperson of the Health Select Committee. He was later appointed as the party's spokesperson for data and cybersecurity and for disability issues. In January 2019, Reti was designated as National's spokesperson for tertiary education, skills, and employment. Between 25 March and 26 May 2020, Reti was a member of the Epidemic Response Committee, a select committee that considered the government's response to the COVID-19 pandemic. On 2 July, Reti was promoted to number 13 on the National Party's list ranking within Todd Muller's shadow cabinet and also given the associate drug reform portfolio. On 15 July 2020, Judith Collins, the new Leader of the Opposition, announced that Reti was to be promoted to Spokesperson for Health for National.

During the 2020 New Zealand general election held on 17 October, preliminary results had Reti ahead of Labour candidate Emily Henderson in the Whangārei electorate by 162 votes. Following the publication of official results on 6 November, he lost the seat to Henderson by 431 votes. He returned to Parliament on the National Party list.

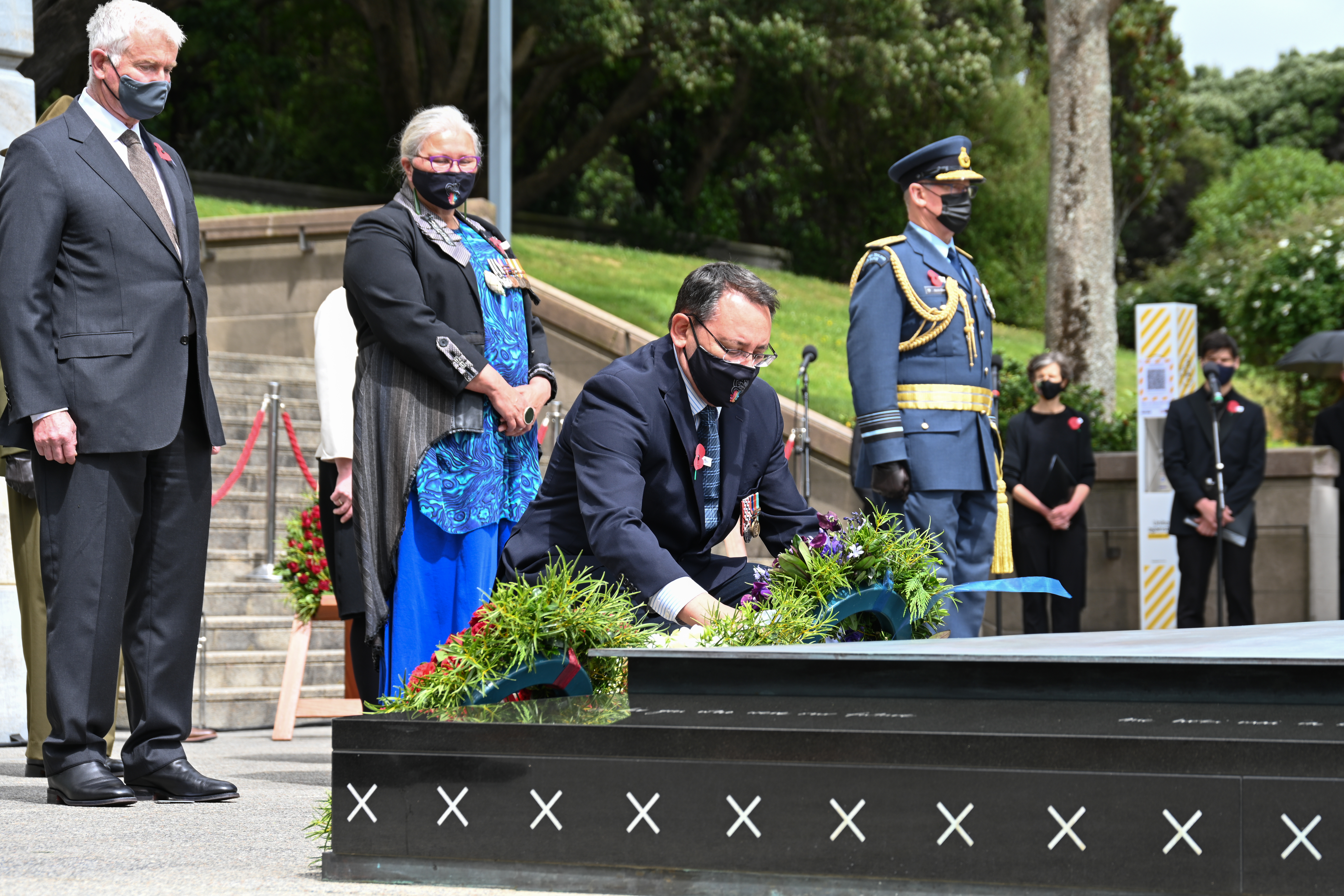
Reti lays a wreath on behalf of the Opposition on the Tomb of the Unknown Warrior, Wellington, during the 2021 Armistice Day commemoration

On 10 November, Reti was unanimously elected as the deputy leader of the National Party during a party caucus meeting.

In mid November 2021, Reti briefly served as interim leader of the National Party after Judith Collins lost a vote of no confidence. On 30 November, he was succeeded by Christopher Luxon, who became the party's new leader and the new Leader of the Opposition.

On 17 January 2022, Reti successfully petitioned SpaceX CEO Elon Musk to provide Starlink satellite technology to Tonga after the Hunga Tonga–Hunga Ha'apai tsunami. Tonga lost internet connectivity to the world after the underwater cables were ruptured during the eruption and resulting tsunami. Reti did not have a pre-existing relationship with Musk but reasoned that "I guess Elon Musk can only say no and if you don't ask you don't know". In response Musk's SpaceX set up a free high-speed internet service for the affected remote islands, to remain until they could be reconnected by cable. In acknowledging the 50 VSAT terminals provided free of charge the Tongan Prime Minister, Siaosi Sovaleni, said "It is rather paradoxical for a devastating volcanic eruption and tsunami to bring to our shores the latest in satellite and communications technology".

In March 2022, the New Zealand Herald removed an opinion piece Reti had written. In it, he claimed that self-harm had increased during the COVID-19 pandemic; other journalists using the same data found the opposite, and a data journalist for the Herald called the graphs in the article "poor and misleading".

In mid-March 2022, Reti was moved up from fifth to fourth place during a reshuffle of Luxon's shadow cabinet.

In mid-July 2023, 1News reported that Reti accompanied Hato Hone St John and Wellington Free Ambulance paramedics as an observer on weekend shifts for nearly three months. According to Reti, New Zealand health workers were overworked and emergency departments were under-staffed and over-resourced. Reti defended his actions, stating that he complied with St John's and Wellington Free Ambulance's policies and procedures. In response to concerns about privacy and patient consent, St John's and Wellington Free Ambulance developed a new agreement on managing ambulance observers.

== Sixth National Government, 2023–present ==
During the 2023 New Zealand general election, Reti won the Whangārei electorate by a margin of 11,424 votes and defeated Labour candidate Angie Warren-Clark.

=== Minister of Health, 2023–2025 ===
Following the formation of the National-led coalition government in late November 2023, Reti was appointed as Minister of Health and Minister for Pacific Peoples. On 28 November Reti, in his capacity as Health Minister, defended the Government's plans to scrap the Smokefree Environments and Regulated Products (Smoked Tobacco) Amendment Act 2022, which reduced the number of retailers allowed to sell tobacco to 600 and banned anyone born after 2009 from buying cigarettes. Reti argued that vaping would be the primary way to reduce smoking under the new Government. He also defended the Government's plans to dissolve Te Aka Whai Ora (the Māori Health Authority), stating that decision-making should be devolved at the hapū (sub-tribe level) rather than centralised in Wellington. Reti and the Government drew criticism from Tongan community leader Pakilau Manase Lua, the New Zealand Council of Medical Colleges chair Dr Samantha Murton, and Labour health spokesperson Ayesha Verrall over their plans to repeal Smokefree legislation, scrap the Māori Health Authority, and review the role of the Treaty of Waitangi in New Zealand law.

On 15 December, Waatea News reported that Reti and Associate Health Minister Matt Doocey had several initial meetings with Te Aka Whai Ora's chief executive Riana Manuel. While Reti confirmed that the Government would proceed with its plans to dissolve the organisation, he reaffirmed the Government's commitment to continue working with iwi-Māori partnership boards on the health needs of the Māori community including mental health. On 18 December, Radio New Zealand reported that Reti was tasked with reviewing the University of Auckland's Māori and Pacific Admissions Scheme (MAPAS), an affirmative action programme seeking to boost the number of Māori and Pasifika medical graduates. Reti had benefitted from the programme while studying to be a doctor at University of Auckland.

On 19 December, Reti appointed Ken Whelan as a Crown observer to Te Whatu Ora (Health New Zealand), citing ongoing challenges that the public health service was facing following the previous Labour Government's 2022 health reforms. On 21 December Reti announced that the Government would invest in a NZ$50 million package over the two next years to help Māori health providers boost low immunisation rates within the Māori community.

In late June 2024, Reti announcing that the Government would be investing NZ$604 million over the next four years in boosting Pharmac funding for 54 new medicines including 26 cancer treatments. He reiterated that this funding would allow the Government to fulfill its 2023 election promise of funding 13 cancer drugs. The Government had been unable to include the 13 new cancer drugs as part of the 2024 New Zealand budget due to a NZ$1.77 billion funding "cliff" in Pharmac's budget left by the previous Labour Government.

On 10 September 2024, Reti instructed Hawke's Bay health services to stop prioritising young Māori and Pasifika youths for free doctor and nurse visits on the basis of their ethnicity. Later that week, the Cabinet Office issued a new directive that public services should be delivered based on "need" rather than "race," fulfilling a coalition agreement secured by ACT and NZ First.

On 8 October 2024, Reti announced that the Government would allocated an extra NZ$6 million to improve wait times and patient care and services at Palmerston North Hospital.

=== 2025 cabinet reshuffle ===
On 19 January 2025, Christopher Luxon announced during a cabinet reshuffle that Reti would be relinquishing the Health portfolio, which would be given to Simeon Brown instead. He was also appointed as Minister of Science, Innovation and Technology, Minister of Statistics, and given the new Universities portfolio. Reti was also demoted from fourth to ninth place in the Cabinet ranking.

=== Minister of Statistics ===
On 18 June 2025 Reti, as Statistics Minister, announced that the Government would replace the five-yearly census in 2030 with a combination of administrative data from other government agencies and smaller annual surveys that a sample of the population will complete. He confirmed that there would be no census in 2028, with the 2023 census being the final one. Reti said that the traditional census was "no longer financially viable", stating "despite the unsustainable and escalating costs, successive censuses have been beset with issues or failed to meet expectations." While acting Statistics New Zealand chief and Government Statistician Mary Craig welcomed the scrapping of the traditional census, University of Waikato Institute for Population Research senior research fellow Dr Jesse Whitehead and New Zealand Institute of Economic Research economist Bill Kaye expressed concern that discontinuing the five-year census would impact data equity and have an adverse impact on "marginalised" communities including Māori, Pasifika, LGBTQ, the disabled and ethnic communities.

=== Retirement ===
On 10 March 2026, Reti announced that he would retire from Parliament at the 2026 general election. He expressed his gratitude for the support he received from his colleagues during his political career, and noted upgrading of the highway to Whangārei, breast cancer screening extensions, the establishment of a medical school at the University of Waikato, and the amalgamation of Crown Research Institutes as career highlights.

Following a cabinet reshuffle on 2 April 2026, Reti was succeeded as Minister of Statistics by Scott Simpson and as Minister of Science, Innovation and Technology by Penny Simmonds. She also gained Reti's tertiary education portfolio.

On 7 April 2026, Reti was granted retention of the title The Honourable for life, in recognition of his service as a member of the Executive Council.

== Political positions ==
=== New Dunedin Hospital ===
In 2024 Reti suggested the possibility of cancelling the construction of a new inpatient building in Dunedin, back tracking on an election promise made a year earlier. This announcement triggered a protest of 35,000 people on the streets of Dunedin, one of the largest protests in New Zealand history. Shortly after Reti was removed as Minister of Health, the government recommitted to the construction of a new inpatient building.

=== Medical marijuana ===
Reti authored a private members bill in 2018 that would have extended access to medical, but not recreational, marijuana.

=== Euthanasia ===
Reti voted against the End of Life Choice Act 2019.

=== Abortion ===
Reti voted against the Abortion Legislation Act 2020.

When asked for his comments on the overturning of Roe v Wade in the United States, and whether similar changes could take place in New Zealand, Reti stated "That would always be a decision for caucus, and so I'm not going to offer a position here now, but we are mindful in watching what happens with Roe vs Wade".

=== Obesity ===
In mid-November 2020, Reti supported National Party leader Judith Collins' earlier remarks about obesity being a matter of personal responsibility. Reti said that National had a "good obesity framework" and that people could be trusted to make the right choice with the "right information." While acknowledging that socio-economic and genetics were factors in obesity, he added there were other reasons including medical factors for putting on weight.

=== Cancer treatment access ===
Reti authored a private members bill to allow unfunded cancer medication to be administered in public hospitals. Under the bill patients would continue to pay the cost of unfunded medicines, but not for the administration of them. The bill was drawn from the ballot in 2021.

=== Fluoridation ===
Reti is a supporter of fluoridation, having self-sponsored work to implement it in Northland but did not support removing fluoridation decisions from the local DHB.

=== Conversion therapy ban ===
Reti was one of only eight MPs to vote against the Conversion Practices Prohibition Legislation Act 2022. The then-leader of the National Party Judith Collins instructed all National MPs to vote against the bill at its first reading, and as party deputy leader Reti defended the party's position and sought to add an exemption to the bill for parents regarding bill. National's leadership changed to Christopher Luxon who allowed his MPs to vote according to their conscience; Reti voted against the bill at its second reading, and at its third and final reading. Reti said he abhors conversion therapy but "What is not clear in the bill is the protection of reasonable parents having reasonable conversations with their children."

== Personal life ==
Reti has three adult children: two daughters and one son. Reti was raised a Mormon but no longer attends church.

New Zealand Parliament
Preceded by Phil Heatley	Member of Parliament for Whangarei; 2014–2020	Succeeded by Emily Henderson
Party political offices
Preceded by Gerry Brownlee	Deputy Leader of the National Party; 2020–2021	Succeeded by Nicola Willis
