= Charles Morison =

Scottish-born New Zealand barrister (1861–1920)

Charles Morison KC
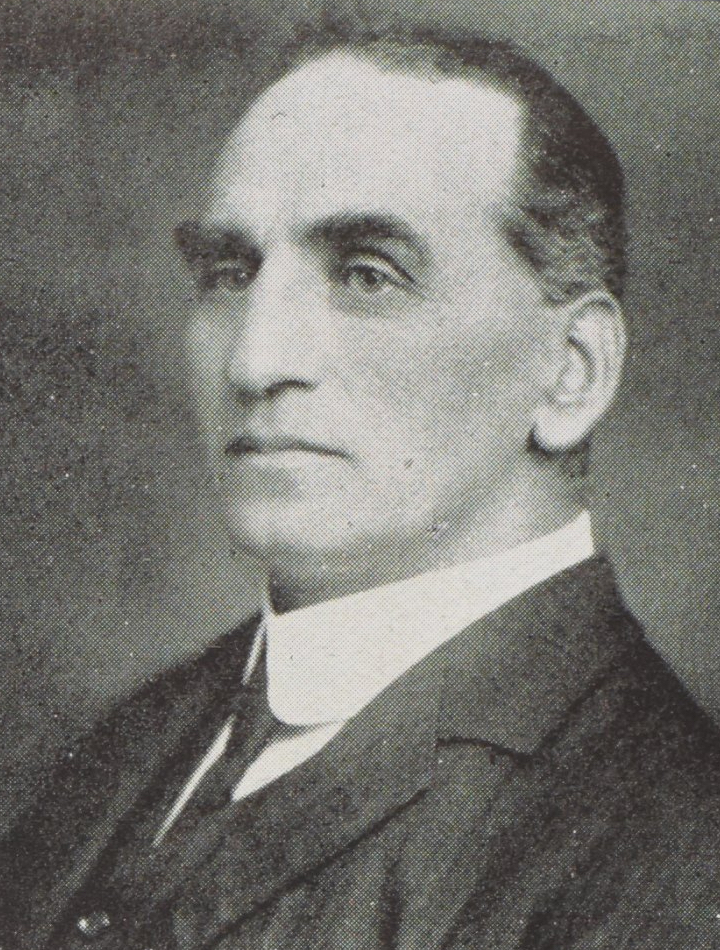
- Morison in 1912
- Born: Charles Bruce Morison; 1861; Elgin, Moray, Scotland
- Died: 6 January 1920 (aged 58–59); Wellington, New Zealand
- Burial place: Karori Cemetery
- Other name: C. B. Morison
- Citizenship: United Kingdom, New Zealand
- Occupations: Barrister, politician
- Political party: Reform Party
- Spouse: Caroline Annie Haultain (m. 1887)
- Relatives: Theodore Haultain (father-in-law)

Charles Bruce Morison KC (1861 – 6 January 1920), known by his first name and referred to as C. B. Morison in contemporary sources, was a New Zealand barrister and politician. He stood in two elections around the turn of the century in the Otaki electorate and was later active with the Reform Party.

== Early life and political ambitions ==
Morison was born in 1861 in Elgin, Scotland. His family emigrated to New Zealand when he was a boy. He received his education at Nelson College.

Morison twice contested the Otaki electorate for conservative interests. In the 6 December 1899 election, he was defeated by the incumbent, Henry Augustus Field. Upon Field's death within days of the election, he contested the resulting by-election on 6 January 1900 and was beaten by Field's brother William. In later years, Morison was one of the principal organisers of the Reform Party in Wellington.

== Legal career ==
Morison received his legal apprenticeship with Arthur Rigby Bunny, the second son of Henry Bunny. After his admission to the bar, he practised at Woodville for a short time from 1885, before moving to Wellington. Arthur Atkinson joined him as a partner in 1892. When that partnership dissolved, he partnered with C. A. Loughnan, a brother of Robert Loughnan. In 1896, they took over the practice of Worley Edwards upon his appointment to the Supreme Court. Loughnan left the firm to become the city solicitor for Palmerston North and was replaced by his brother F. O. B. Loughnan. That partnership lasted until 1904, and for the following two years, Morison practised on his own. In 1906, he took G. McLean as a partner, and upon his partner's death in 1908, W. S. Smith joined him. From 1912, David Smith worked for him as an assistant; Smith would later become a judge.

Morison was appointed a King's Counsel in November 1912. He specialised in company law and Māori land issues. He wrote several books on legal matters, of which The Law of Limited Liability Companies in New Zealand (1904) and Rescission of Contracts (1916) are regarded as standard works.

== Family and death ==
On 22 September 1887, Morison married Caroline Annie Haultain, the youngest daughter of Theodore Haultain. They had two sons and two daughters. Morison died on 6 January 1920 at his home at Aurora Terrace in Kelburn, Wellington. His son Bruce died in Uganda in 1924. His wife died in April 1939 in Wellington. Charles and Caroline Annie Morison are buried at Karori Cemetery.

== Bibliography ==
- Morison, Charles Bruce (1888). The Licensing Laws of New Zealand: A Treatise on the Licensing Act, 1881, and Amendment Act, 1882, and the Decisions Thereon. Edwards & Company, Printers and Publishers.
- Morison, Charles Bruce (1994) [1904]. Morison's company law. Butterworths. ISBN 9780409646962.
- Morison, Charles Bruce (1904). The Law of Limited Liability Companies in New Zealand: The Companies Act, 1903, and the Mining Companies Acts, 1894 to 1902, with Explanatory Notes and Forms. Gordon & Gotch.
- Morison, Charles Bruce (1916). Rescission of Contracts: A Treatise on the Principles Governing the Rescission, Discharge, Avoidance and Dissolution of Contracts.
