= Field Hut =

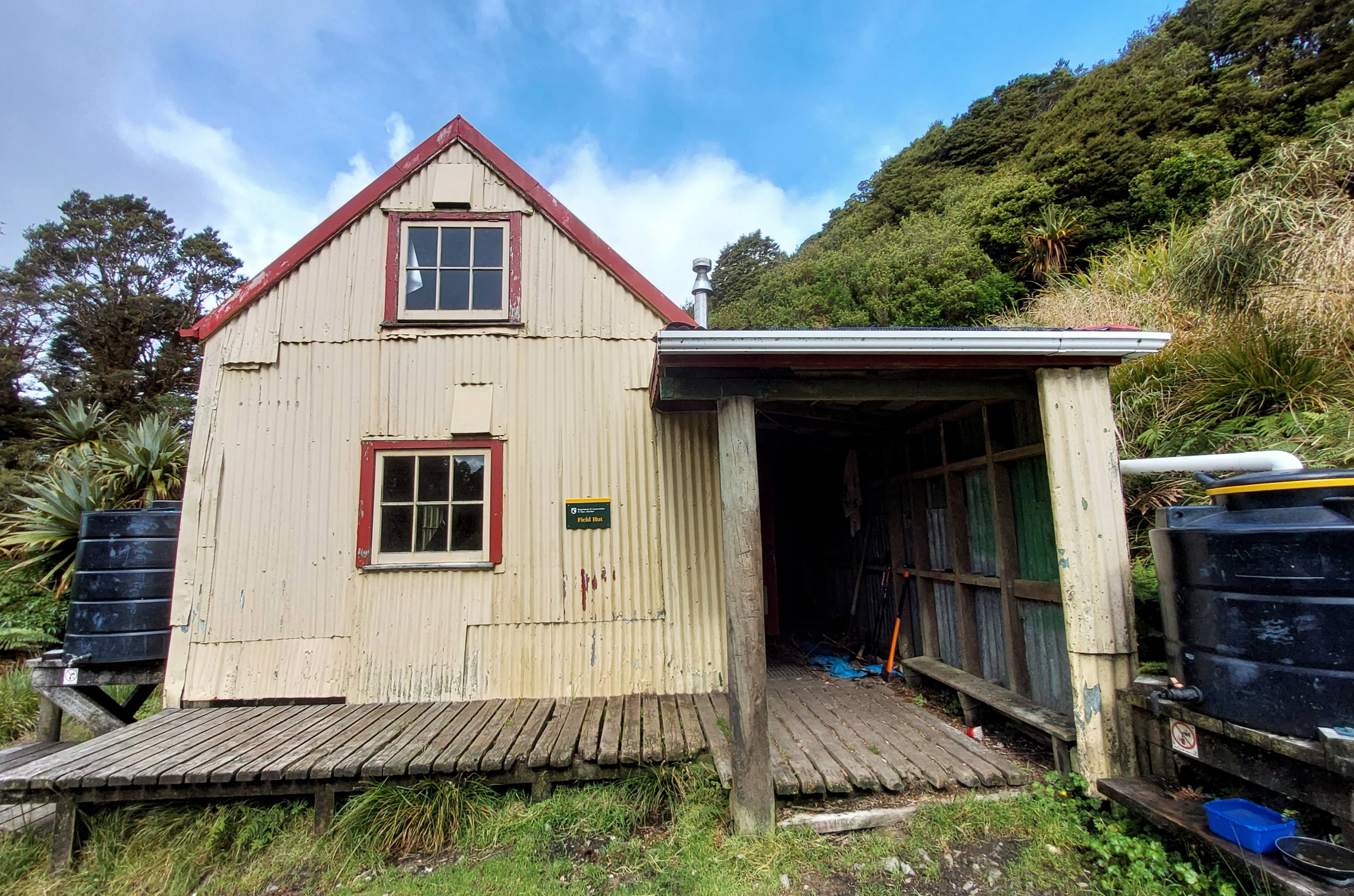

General information
- Type: Tramping hut
- Architectural style: Vernacular
- Location: Judd's Ridge, Tararua Ranges
- Coordinates: 40°54′28″S 175°15′22″E
- Named for: William Hughes Field
- Year built: 1924
- Owner: Tararua Tramping Club
- Operator: Department of Conservation

Design and construction
- Main contractor: Joe Gibbs and Jack Fisk

Heritage New Zealand – Category 1
- Designated: 20 June 2024
- Reference no.: 9821

Field Hut is a historic tramping hut in the Tararua Range of New Zealand. Field Hut was constructed by the Tararua Tramping Club following the death of one of their members and is named after the first president of the club, William Hughes Field. Field Hut has been used by thousands of trampers making the journey to the Southern Crossing. Field Hut has remained largely the same throughout its history and retains evidence of pit-sawing construction, a technique that was rare at the time. A threat of demolition in the 1990s lead to Field Hut's inclusion on the Wellington Region Heritage Inventory and eventually registration as a category 1 historic building with Heritage New Zealand.

== History ==
In 1919, due to the popularity of tramping in the Tararuas, the Tararua Tramping Club was formed by Fred Vosseler and Member of Parliament for Otaki William Hughes Field, with Field serving as the first president. Due to the rough conditions of the Tararuas and the death of club member Esmond Kime, who had attempted to climb Mount Hector the club decided to construct a hut for trampers. Field gave a £100 donation and secured a government grant to construct a hut in the Tararuas on the way to the Southern Crossing. In 1924, two members of the club, Joe Gibbs and Jack Fisk, were hired due to their construction of the Alpha Hut (destroyed 1952) in the Tararuas 2 years prior. They worked on constructing a track for packhorses for 2 months before starting the 3 month construction of the hut, which was constructed on-site by felling nearby trees and pit-sawing the timber. Pit-sawing was a rare technique in the 1920s and extant pit-sawn buildings are very rare in New Zealand, Even a century later, Field Hut is still one of the most recently constructed buildings using pit-sawn timber. Field Hut was opened on 26 October 1924, despite construction not being finished. It was planned for 70 members of the Tararua Tramping Club to make the journey to celebrate the opening but poor conditions resulted in less than 30 making it. Fred Vosseler, then president of the club, presided over the opening of the hut.

In 1930, Gibbs and Fisk set out to build another hut in the Tararuas; Field Hut was used as a base for the two men in constructing the Kime Hut, with the saw-pit re-used for the timber for Kime Hut. That same year Gibbs would construct the Tauherenikau Hut. Leslie Adkins photographed the hut in 1938, after staying at the hut on his way to climb Mount Hector. Following the deployment of US marines to New Zealand in June 1942, the Tararuas were used for training and Field Hut was frequented by marines conducting training in the Tararuas. Following the Second World War's conclusion significant repairs and alterations took place with the installation of a new fireplace, a larger chimney, enclosement of the porch, and construction of a stand for the water tank.

In 1983, remedial work was carried out by the club to replace the roof and piles of the hut as well as rebuilding the south wall and constructing a verandah. The chairman of the Tararua Forest Park advisory committee praised the club for their commitment to maintaining the hut. In the 1990s, the Department of Conservation proposed that Field Hut be replaced with a bunk hut on Table Top, this plan was opposed by the Tararua Tramping Club and a conservation report by conservation architect Chris Cochran and historian Michael Kelly in 1996 led to the Department of Conservation keeping the hut and developing a maintenance plan in 2001 to protect it as a heritage building. Cochran and Kelly's research helped Field Hut become registered as a Category 1 building with Heritage New Zealand. In 2003 renovations were carried out that involved introducing mattresses for the beds, laminating the windows, a fire exit installed, and a new toilet installed. For the 80th anniversary a panel to Joe Gibbs was unveiled at the hut.

It is estimated more than 1,000 people use the hut each year. Prior to a slip it was estimated that 3,200 people used the Field Hut track each year. The Tararua Tramping Club still maintains and uses the facility and celebrated Field Hut's centenary in 2024.

== Description ==
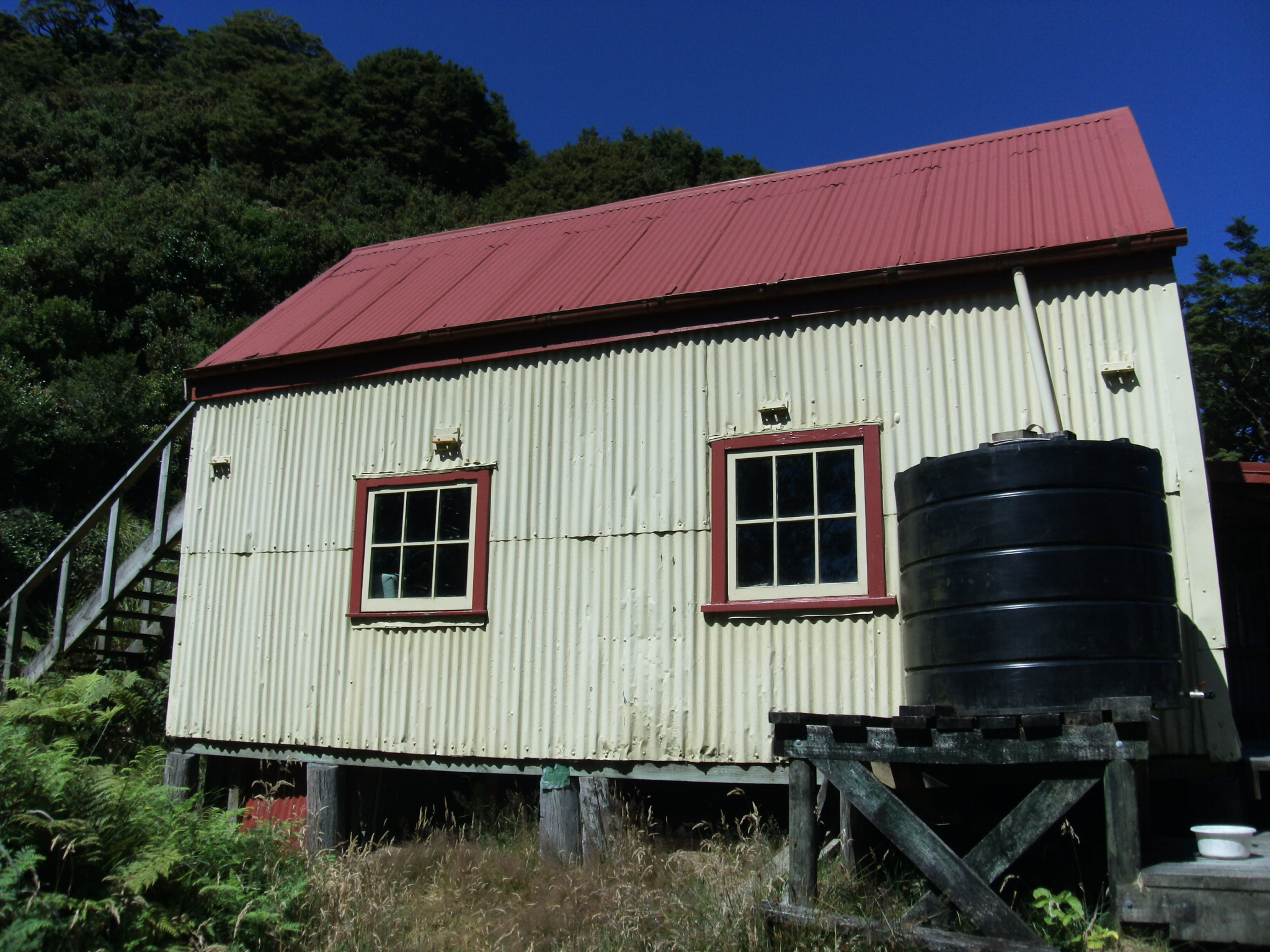
Field Hut from the side

Field Hut is a russet timber and corrugated-iron hut that has remained largely unchanged since its construction. The hut is located on Judd's Ridge in the Tararua Ranges at approximately 750–900 m (2,460–2,950 ft) above sea-level. It is a 3–4 hour trek from the Otaki Fork campground. Pit-saw marks can be noted in the original timber of the building. The roof is gabled and constructed from corrugated iron. The interior of the hut features memorabilia of those involved in the construction of the hut and other notable members of the Tararua Tramping Club. Although the form of the hut remains largely the same less than 25% of the hut's original materials remain. Beech was mostly used for the original material whilst Pinus radiata is mostly used for repair material.

Outside the hut remains evidence of the original saw-pit used in the construction of the hut, one of few identified in New Zealand. The surrounds are native bush, mostly southern beech and mountain cabbage tree. A makeshift helipad is located just above the hut.

Earlier huts adhered to Victorian and Edwardian morality and imposed separate sleeping quarters for men and women; Field Hut did not have separate sleeping quarters and instead had two open rooms, on the ground floor and in the loft.

== Legacy ==
Field Hut's has influenced the design of both tramping huts and contemporary domestic architecture. Heritage New Zealand describes the hut as "a significant landmark within the Tararua Range" and an icon of tramping and outdoorsmanship.

It is estimated more than 1,000 people use the hut each year. Prior to a slip it was estimated that 3,200 people used the Field Hut track each year. The Tararua Tramping Club holds the hut in high regard and regularly maintains and uses the facility, with a celebration Field Hut's centenary being held in 2024.
