= Terisa Ngobi =

New Zealand politician

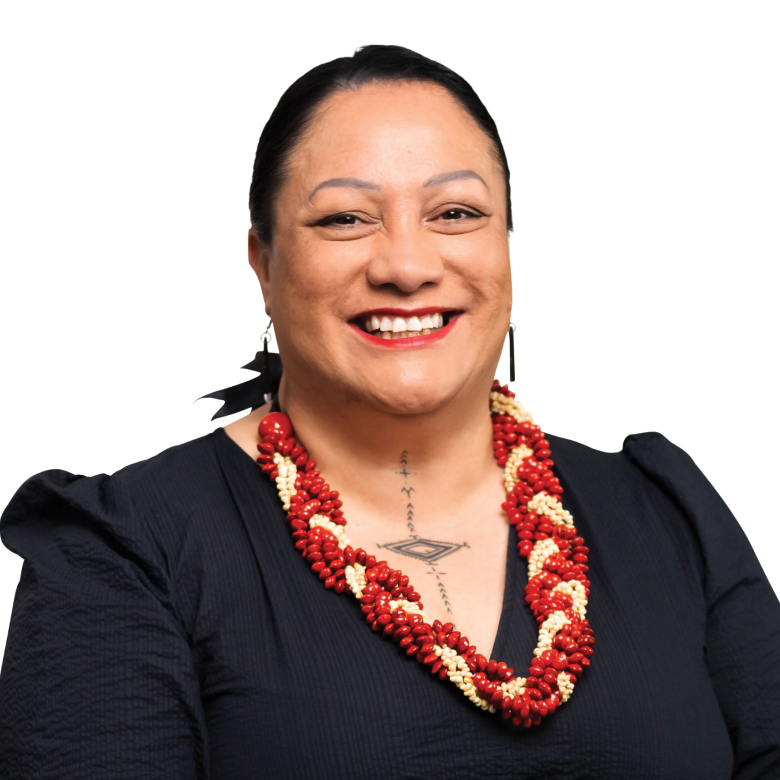
- Ngobi in 2023

Member of the New Zealand Parliament for Ōtaki
- In office 17 October 2020 – 14 October 2023
- Preceded by: Nathan Guy
- Succeeded by: Tim Costley
- Majority: 2,988

Personal details
- Born: Levin, New Zealand
- Citizenship: New Zealand
- Party: Labour
- Spouse: Henry Ngobi
- Children: 3

Terisa Telesia Ngobi is a New Zealand politician. She was the Member of Parliament for Ōtaki representing the Labour Party from 2020 to 2023.

== Early life ==
Born in Levin, she is of Samoan and Scottish descent. Before entering Parliament, she spent 16 years working for government and non-profit organisations.

== Political career ==
New Zealand Parliament
Years	Term	Electorate	List	Party
2020–2023	53rd	Ōtaki	65	Labour

A member of the ruling centre-left Labour Party, she was elected the Member of the Parliament for Ōtaki in 2020 election, defeating the National candidate Tim Costley by a margin of 2,988 votes.

During the 2023 New Zealand general election, Ngobi was unseated by National candidate Tim Costley, who won by a margin of 6,271 votes.

New Zealand Parliament
Preceded by Nathan Guy	Member of Parliament for Ōtaki; 2020–2023	Succeeded by Tim Costley
