= John Robertson (New Zealand politician, born 1875) =

New Zealand politician

The Honourable John Robertson
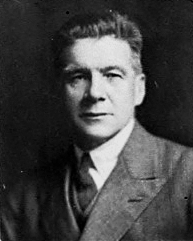

Member of the New Zealand Parliament for Otaki
- In office 20 November 1911 – 10 December 1914
- Preceded by: William Hughes Field
- Succeeded by: William Hughes Field

Member of the New Zealand Parliament for Masterton
- In office 27 November 1935 – 25 September 1943
- Preceded by: George Sykes
- Succeeded by: Garnet Mackley

Personal details
- Born: 1875 Scotland
- Died: 5 August 1952 (aged 76–77) New Zealand
- Party: Labour Party
- Children: 2

John Robertson (1875 – 5 August 1952) was a New Zealand politician of the Labour Party.

== Biography ==
=== Early life ===
Robertson was born in Scotland, and was a watchmaker by trade. Interested in politics early, he joined the Social Democratic Federation. He was then in 1893 a foundation member of the Independent Labour Party in Britain. In 1895 he became Secretary of the party, the youngest man to hold the job. He emigrated to New Zealand in 1902. He settled in Dunedin and continued his trade as a watchmaker until moving to Palmerston North in 1910.

In 1920 he entered the film trade as the manager of the Crystal Palace Theatre in Christchurch. Upon the formation of the New Zealand Motion Picture Exhibitors' Association in 1927 he became its national secretary. He was in addition a member of both the Government Film Advisory Committee and the New Zealand Film Industry Board.

=== Political career ===
New Zealand Parliament
Years	Term	Electorate	Party
1911–1913	18th	Otaki	Labour
1913–1914	Changed allegiance to:		Social Democrat
1935–1938	25th	Masterton	Labour
1938–1943	26th	Masterton	Labour

He represented the Otaki electorate from 1911, when he was elected on the second ballot with Reform Party support, having been nominated by the flax-workers union. He stood Labour Party. though was also endorsed by the New Zealand Socialist Party.

Robertson was the only sitting Labour MP who supported the formation of the Social Democratic Party in 1913 and joined the party. He ran for re-election in Otaki in 1914, but he was defeated by William Hughes Field of the Reform Party. During the 1914 election, Robertson was the Social Democrat's representative in distributing servicemen's votes as he was their most senior MP at the time.

Robertson was the candidate for the Labour Party in the Riccarton electorate in the 1919 election, but came last of the three candidates. In 1933 he stood unsuccessfully for a seat on the Wellington City Council on the Labour Party ticket.

Later he represented the Masterton electorate for the Labour Party from 1935 to 1943, when he was again defeated. After he lost his seat in parliament he stood for Mayor of Masterton as Labour's candidate, but was defeated by William Kemp.

He was then appointed to the Legislative Council on 31 January 1946 and served until its abolition on 31 December 1950. He was then an active member of the Miramar branch of the Labour Party.

=== Death ===
He died in Wellington aged 76 on 5 August 1952. He was survived by his wife, son and daughter.

== Notes ==
New Zealand Parliament
Preceded by William Hughes Field	Member of Parliament for Otaki; 1911–1914	Succeeded by William Hughes Field
Preceded by George Sykes	Member of Parliament for Masterton; 1935–1943	Succeeded by Garnet Mackley
