= Darren Hughes =

New Zealand politician (born 1978)

The Honourable Darren Hughes
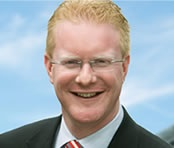

25th Minister of Statistics
- In office 5 November 2007 – 19 November 2008
- Prime Minister: Helen Clark
- Preceded by: Clayton Cosgrove
- Succeeded by: Maurice Williamson

Member of the New Zealand Parliament for Ōtaki
- In office 27 July 2002 – 8 November 2008
- Preceded by: Judy Keall
- Succeeded by: Nathan Guy

Member of the New Zealand Parliament for New Zealand Labour Party list
- In office 8 November 2008 – 5 April 2011
- Succeeded by: Louisa Wall (Note: Normally, list MPs do not have individual predecessors or successors, but Hughes resigned during a sitting parliament and therefore was succeeded by Wall.)

Personal details
- Born: 3 April 1978 (age 48)
- Party: Labour
- Education: Victoria University of Wellington; London School of Economics

Darren Colyn Hughes (born 3 April 1978) is a New Zealand former Member of Parliament between 2002 and 2011, first elected at the age of 24. He represented the Labour Party and was a Minister outside Cabinet in the Fifth Labour Government of New Zealand.

In 2011, Hughes resigned from Parliament and in 2012, he relocated to the United Kingdom to become the Campaigns and Research Director of the Electoral Reform Society. In 2017, Hughes became Chief Executive of the Electoral Reform Society, based in South London.

== Early life and education ==
Hughes attended Coley Street Primary School in Foxton, St Josephs and then Horowhenua College in Levin. While at school Hughes was involved in the school and wider community including a three-year stint as Student Representative on the Board of Trustees.

In 1994, Hughes was a Youth MP. He was the first Youth MP to later be elected to Parliament. Hughes attended Victoria University of Wellington, and was a member of Vic Labour, where he completed a Bachelor of Arts in public policy and social policy. In 2017, Hughes completed a master's degree at the London School of Economics.

== In government (2002–2008) ==
New Zealand Parliament
Years	Term	Electorate	List	Party
2002–2005	47th	Otaki	51	Labour
2005–2008	48th	Otaki	34	Labour
2008–2011	49th	List	19	Labour

Hughes was elected to parliament as member for Otaki in the 2002 general election, standing for the Labour Party. For the next six years he was New Zealand's youngest MP. In 2005, he was re-elected with the country's smallest majority, 382.

As a local MP, Hughes had a strong record of delivering for the communities in the Otaki constituency. One example was Horowhenua Health Centre in Levin which opened in 2007. The $16 million facility was one of Hughes' proudest achievements. He also organised a local campaign to save the centre when it was threatened by budget cuts in 2010.

=== Voting record ===
Hughes voted in favour of a law allowing same sex civil unions and the decriminalisation of prostitution, but against a Death with Dignity law.

=== Party responsibilities and ministerial positions ===
Hughes was his party's junior whip and a Member of the Officers of Parliament Select Committee. In November 2007, as a part of the fifth Labour government's final reshuffle, Prime Minister Helen Clark made him a Minister outside Cabinet with the Statistics portfolio. He was also made the associate minister for Social Development and Employment. He also served as deputy Leader of the House. As a government minister and member of the Executive Council, Hughes is able to use the title "the Honourable" for life.

== In opposition (2008–2011) ==
In the 2008 general election the National Party defeated Labour. Hughes lost his Otaki seat to Nathan Guy but, being listed by Labour at 19, returned to Parliament as a list MP. Opposition Leader Phil Goff appointed him Transport Spokesperson. He was also made the opposition's senior whip.

On 15 June 2010, as part of a shadow-cabinet reshuffle, Hughes became the Spokesperson for Infrastructure. Later, he was also given the Education portfolio and served as Shadow Leader of the House from 2009 to 2011.

In 2010, Darren Hughes submitted a private members' bill to lower the drink driving limit to 0.05 (its full name was the Land Transport (Safer Alcohol Limits for Driving) Amendment Bill). The bill was his response to an earlier government decision to not lower the limit. It was placed on the ballot in June, August and November, but not drawn. According to the New Zealand Herald at the time, Hughes "…drafted his legislation only after the Government decided not to lower the limit. But, commendably, he has been careful not to make it an exercise in points-scoring." Hughes was quoted as saying he wanted politicians to "put aside their party differences and work together on issues of road safety".

== Police investigation and resignation ==
Hughes's time as an MP ended abruptly in March 2011 after a young man laid a police complaint of a sexual nature against him. The complaint concerned events that occurred on 2 March. Shortly after the complaint became public, and while the police were still investigating, Hughes resigned from Parliament. His resignation was announced on 25 March and effective from 5 April. Louisa Wall replaced him as a Labour list MP.

On 8 June the Police confirmed that they would not lay any charges against Hughes.

=== Sequence of events ===
On 23 March 2011 Hughes confirmed that he was "being investigated by police after an alleged late night incident." This announcement was designed to end speculation surrounding his Labour party colleagues.

Hughes denied any wrongdoing but later offered to resign from Parliament. Labour leader Phil Goff, who had known about the complaint for two weeks, initially refused the resignation but changed his mind a day later. Goff announced Hughes' resignation on 25 March 2011.

On the same day Hughes released another statement which in part said:

"My position as an MP has become untenable. In order to be able to exercise my basic rights as a citizen, it is necessary for me to resign as a Member of Parliament. I have informed Phil Goff of my decision.

Although people are commonly thought to be innocent until proven guilty, it has become clear to me that this doesn't apply in the political arena.

I have done nothing wrong, and I remain confident that the legal process will have the right outcome.

My immediate focus is on clearing my name. I will continue to co-operate fully with the police inquiry ..."

Speaker of the House Lockwood Smith confirmed Hughes's resignation on 1 April and it took effect on 5 April 2011.

Over three months after the original incident, on 8 June, the Police announced that they did not have enough evidence to press charges against Hughes. They also revealed that an anonymous letter containing allegations against Hughes had been sent to "some media outlets". They had investigated these allegations but "there were no matters which arose that required police attention".

=== Reallocation of portfolios ===
The roles that Hughes had filled for the Labour opposition went to Sue Moroney, David Shearer and Rick Barker. Moroney took over the education portfolio, with specific responsibility for primary and secondary schooling, and joined the party's front bench. Shearer took over the tertiary education portfolio and Barker became the new senior whip.

=== Replacement by Louisa Wall (as MP) and Peter Foster (as Otaki candidate) ===
Because he had been elected through the party list rather than by an electorate, Hughes' seat passed down Labour's party list to Louisa Wall without a by-election. There were five people listed before Wall who could have taken the seat, but they all stood aside. (Wall, unlike the others, was due to stand for Labour in the general election later that year.) The five were all former MPs, listed at numbers 38–42: Judith Tizard (number 38), Mark Burton, Mahara Okeroa, Martin Gallagher and Dave Hereora (42).

With Hughes not running for re-election, Labour named Raumati lawyer Peter Foster as their Otaki electorate candidate for 2011.

== Current role ==
As of 2020, Hughes is Chief Executive of the Electoral Reform Society (ERS). The ERS is a civil society organisation striving to make British democracy fit for the 21st century. Since joining the ERS in 2012, Hughes has been responsible for driving the Society's campaigns and research priorities.

Under the leadership of Hughes and former Chief Executive Katie Ghose, the Electoral Reform Society has broadened its remit beyond its traditional focus on voting systems, to promote other issues that are vital to the health of British democracy. These priorities fall within the campaign and research fields of "A Fair Franchise", "Who Runs Britain?", and "Democratic Futures".

== Notes ==
New Zealand Parliament
Preceded by Judy Keall	Member of Parliament for Ōtaki; 2002–2008	Succeeded by Nathan Guy
Political offices
Preceded by Clayton Cosgrove	Minister of Statistics; 2007–2008	Succeeded by Maurice Williamson
Party political offices
Preceded by Tim Barnett	Senior Whip of the Labour Party; 2008–2011	Succeeded by Steve Chadwick
