= William Hughes Field =

New Zealand politician

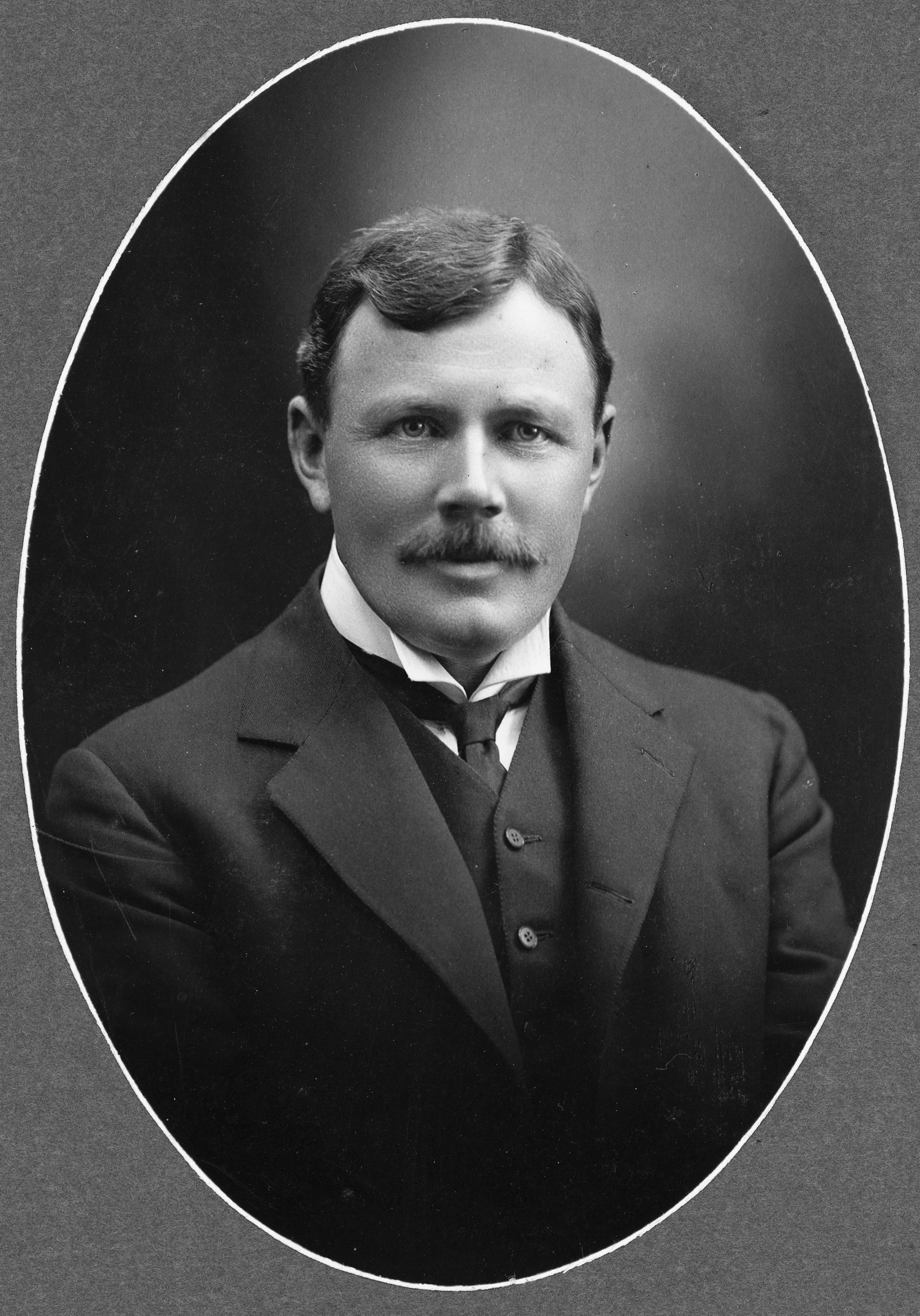
- William Hughes Field between 1900 and 1909

Member of the New Zealand Parliament for Otaki
- In office 6 January 1900 – 20 November 1911
- Preceded by: Henry Augustus Field
- Succeeded by: John Robertson
- In office 10 December 1914 – 1 November 1935
- Preceded by: John Robertson
- Succeeded by: Leonard Lowry

Personal details
- Born: 17 July 1861 Wanganui, New Zealand
- Died: 13 December 1944 (aged 83) Wellington, New Zealand
- Party: Liberal Party
- Other political affiliations: Reform Party
- Spouse: Isabel Hodgkins
- Relations: Henry Augustus Field (brother); Tom Field (unknown relationship); William Mathew Hodgkins (father-in-law); Frances Hodgkins (sister-in-law); Noel Pharazyn (son-in-law)

William Hughes Field (17 July 1861 – 13 December 1944) was a Member of Parliament in New Zealand; first for the Liberal Party, then Independent, and then for the Reform Party. He made a significant contribution to the development of tramping in the Tararua Range.

== Private life ==
Field was born in Wanganui in 1861, the fourth son of Henry Claylands Field (1825–1912) and his wife Margaret Symes Purlow. Field was a lawyer practising in Wellington first elected to parliament in the by-election after the death of the sitting member, his elder brother, Henry Augustus Field (1852–1899). Tom Field (1914–1919), MHR (Member of the House of Representatives) for Nelson, was a relative.

Field was a significant figure in the tramping history of the Tararua Range of which he helped to promote the development of its most popular tramping route, known as the Southern Crossing. Within the Tararuas, both Field Peak and Field Hut, the oldest remaining purpose-built tramping hut in New Zealand, are named after him. He was a founding member of the Tararua Tramping Club, one of the first of many tramping clubs in New Zealand.

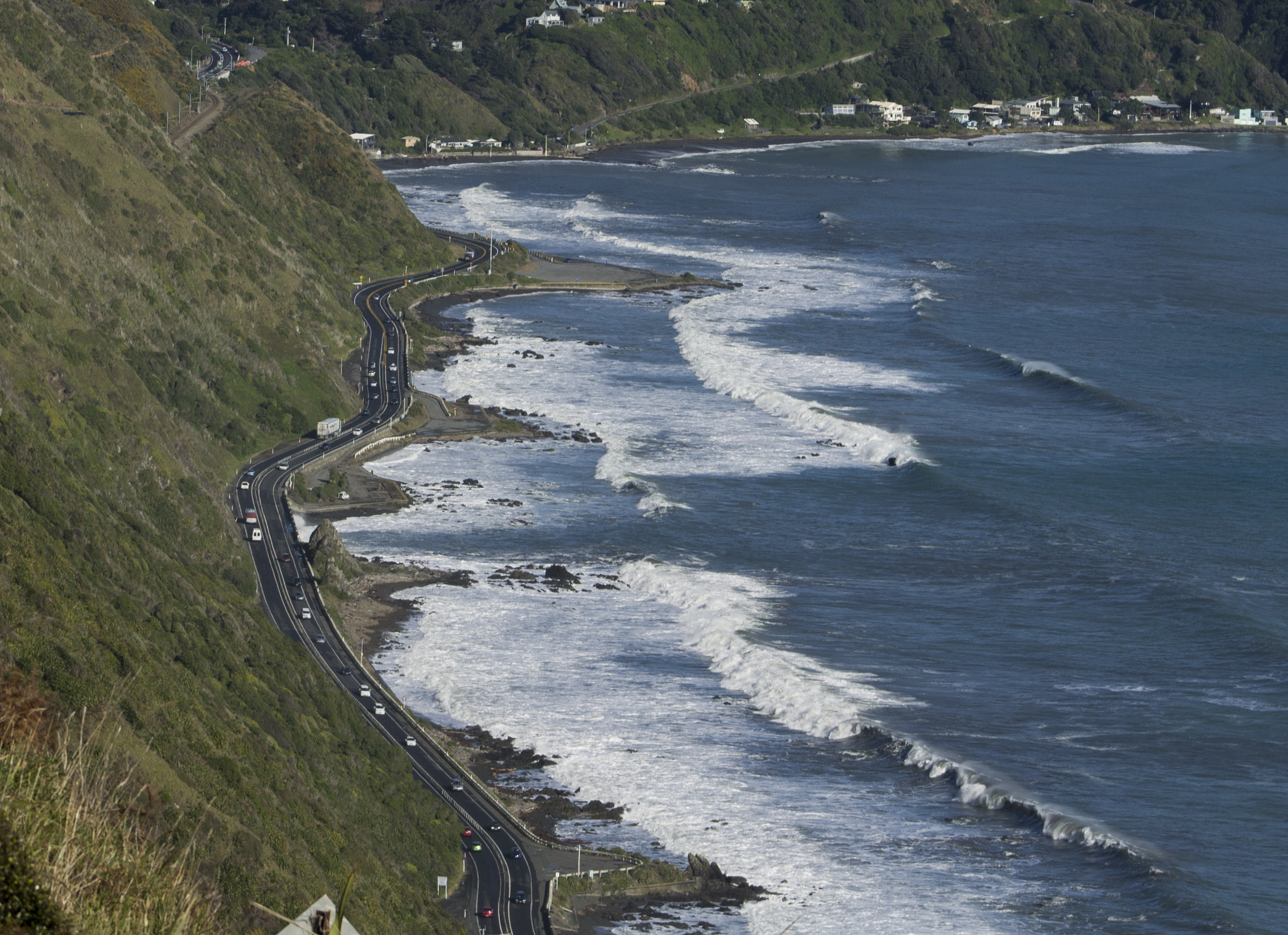
Centennial Highway opened 1940

He was closely associated with improvement to the railway services to his electorate, one train was known as "Field's Express", and the construction of the Tawa Flat tunnel. He also led the campaign for the electrification of the Johnsonville service extended to Paekākāriki in 1940 and, 70 years later, to his electorate at Waikanae in February 2011. With Charles Gray of Pukerua Bay he was largely responsible for the Centennial Highway on the narrow coastline south of Paekākāriki.

Field married Isabel Hodgkins at St Paul's Cathedral, Dunedin, on 26 April 1893. Also known as Cissy she was a daughter of Dunedin watercolourist William Mathew Hodgkins and sister of the celebrated painter Frances Hodgkins. They were to have two daughters and three sons. Eldest daughter Lydia married Noel Pharazyn.

== Member of Parliament ==
New Zealand Parliament
Years	Term	Electorate	Party
1900–1902	14th	Otaki	Liberal
1902–1905	15th	Otaki	Liberal
1905–1908	16th	Otaki	Liberal
1908–1909	17th	Otaki	Independent
1909–1911	Changed allegiance to:		Reform
1914–1919	19th	Otaki	Reform
1919–1922	20th	Otaki	Reform
1922–1925	21st	Otaki	Reform
1925–1928	22nd	Otaki	Reform
1928–1931	23rd	Otaki	Reform
1931–1935	24th	Otaki	Reform

Field won the Otaki electorate in the Horowhenua District in 1900, but lost it to John Robertson of the Labour Party (who had been nominated by the flax-workers union) by 21 votes on the second ballot in 1911. He then won it back in 1914, and held it until he retired in 1935.

He replaced his brother, Henry Augustus Field, when he died in 1899. William Field stood as a Liberal in 1900 and was regarded as a 'country liberal' or 'freehold liberal' and therefore it is not surprising that he moved politically to support the Reform Party over time.

In 1935, he was awarded the King George V Silver Jubilee Medal and in 1937, he was awarded the King George VI Coronation Medal.

== Death ==
Field died in Wellington on 13 December 1944. He was survived by his wife and their five children.

== Notes ==
New Zealand Parliament
Preceded by Henry Augustus Field	Member of Parliament for Otaki; 1900–1911; 1914–1935	Succeeded by John Robertson
Preceded by John Robertson	Member of Parliament for Otaki; 1900–1911; 1914–1935	Succeeded by Leonard Lowry
