= Isabel Field =

New Zealand artist (1867–1950)

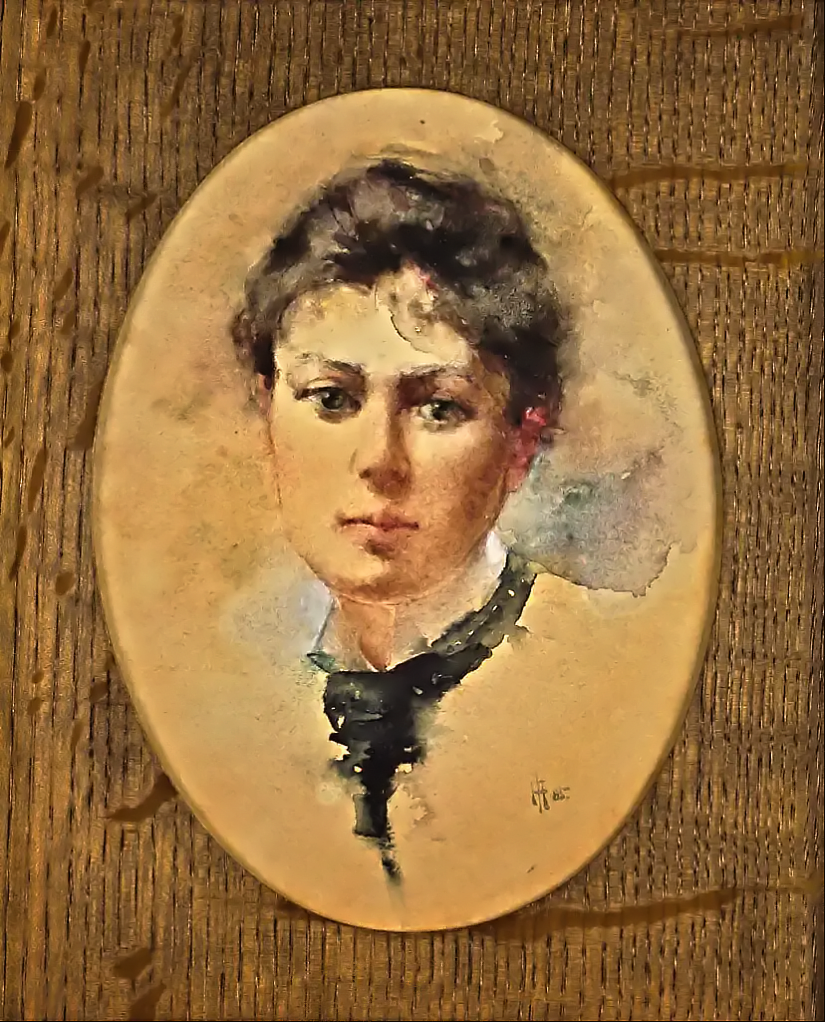
Frances Hodgkin. Рortrait of Isabel Jane Field, 1895.

Isabel Jane Field (née Hodgkins; 1867 – September 1950) was a New Zealand artist. She was sister of the celebrated painter Frances Hodgkins.

== Biography ==
She was born in Dunedin in 1867. Her father was the painter W. M. Hodgkins.

Hodgkins married William Hughes Field at St Paul's Cathedral, Dunedin on 26 April 1893. They were to have two daughters and three sons. Their eldest daughter Lydia married Noel Pharazyn.

Field died in Wellington in late September 1950.

Watercolours by Isabel Field

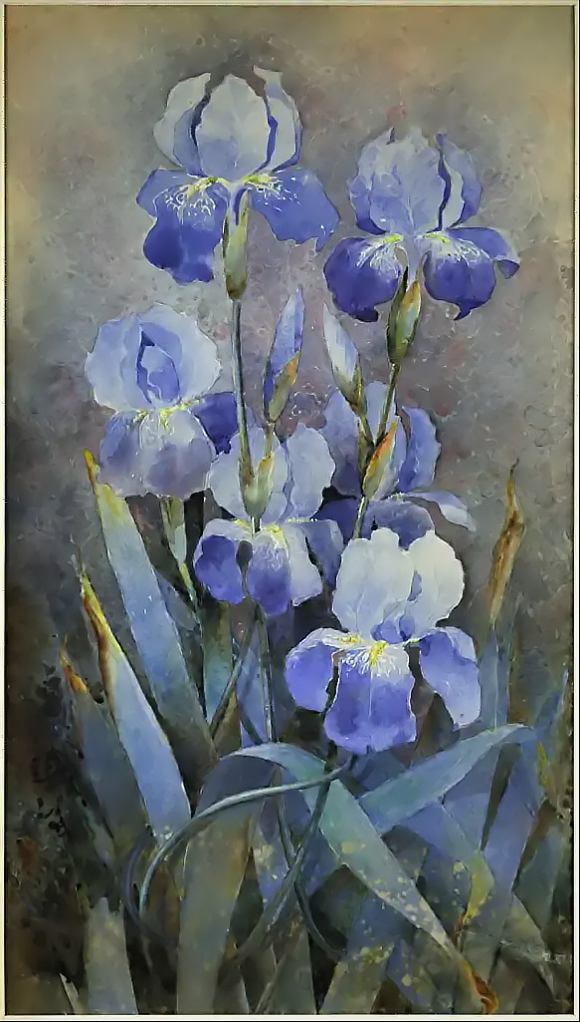
Irises, 1891

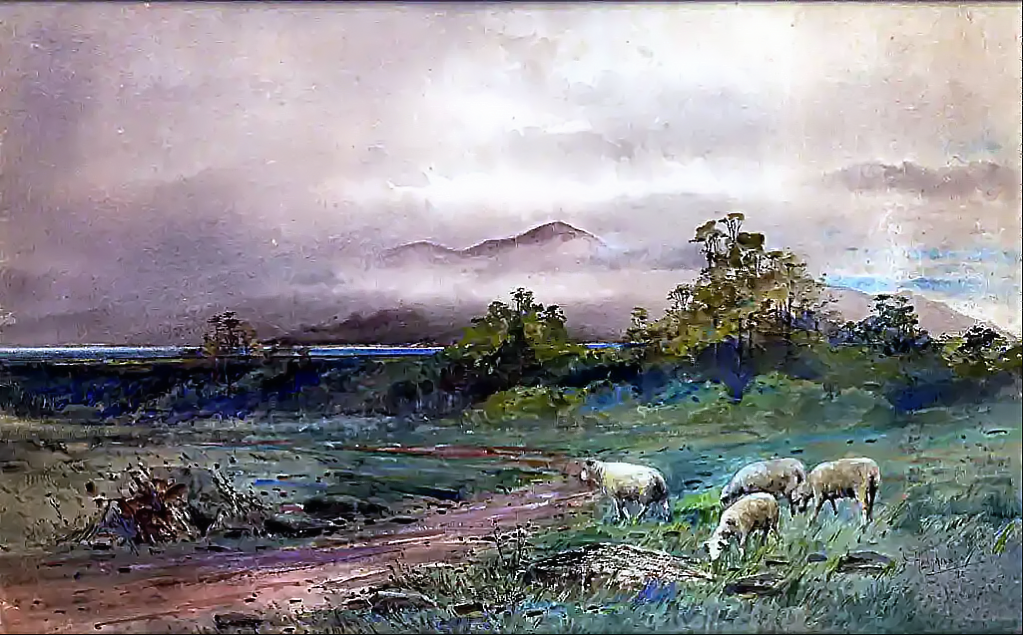
Ngarara Road Station with Kapiti Background, 1892

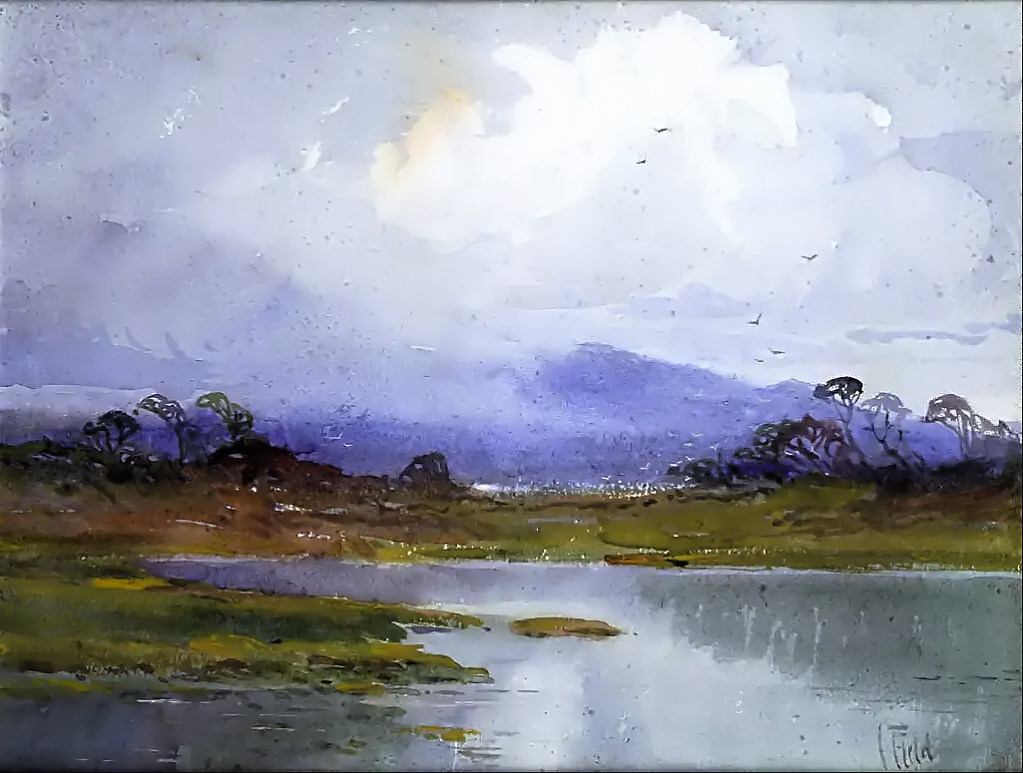
Ngarara Lagoon, Waikanae, 1893

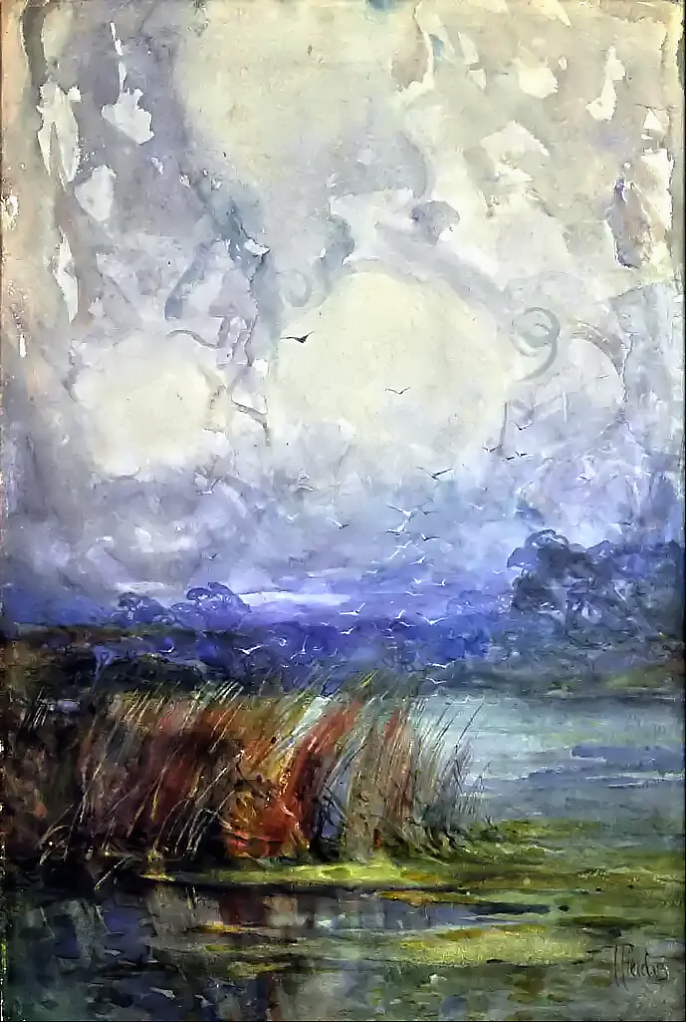
Lagoon at Waikanae, 1896
