= Nathan Guy =

New Zealand politician

The Honourable Nathan Guy
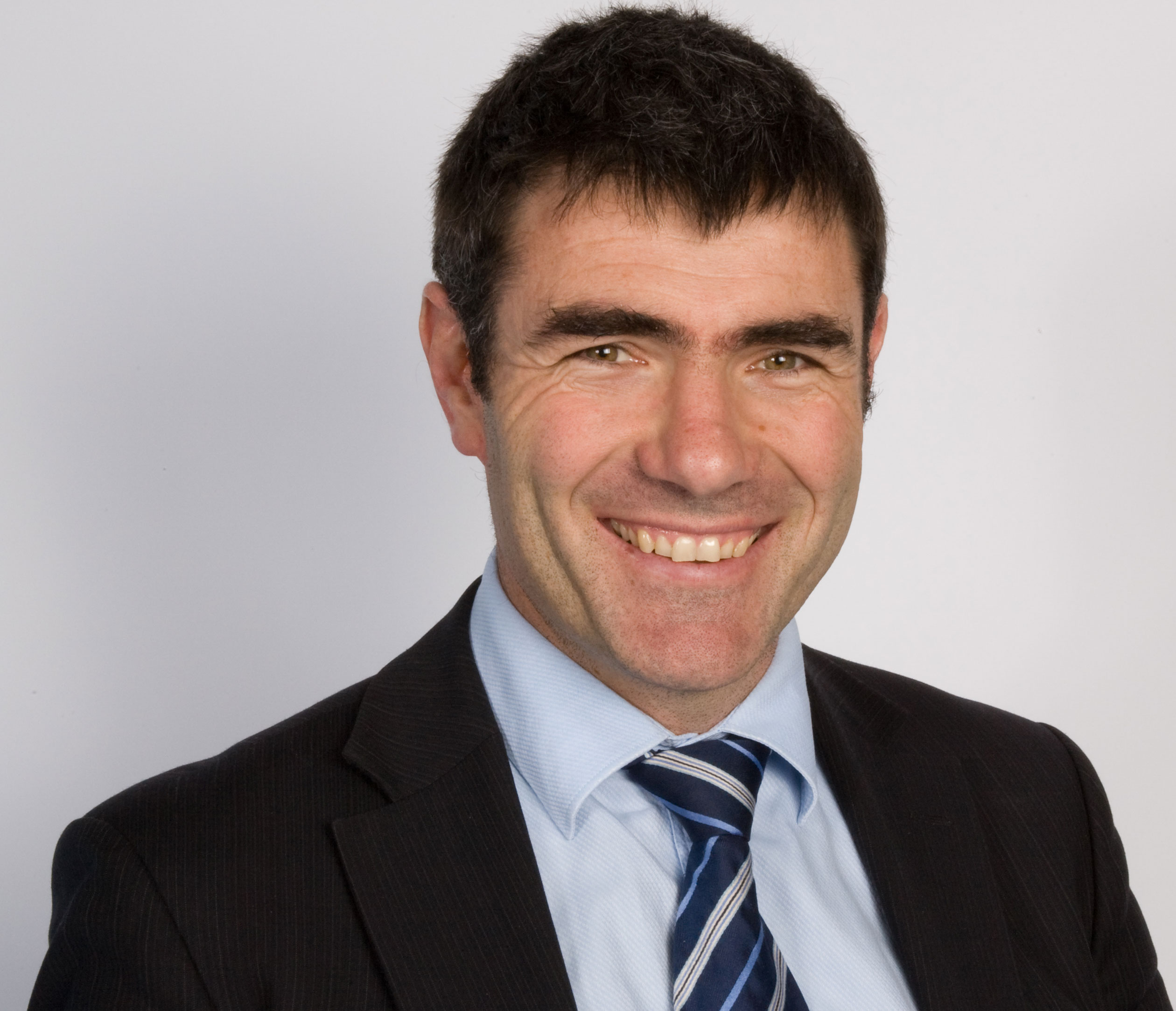

2nd Minister for Primary Industries
- In office 28 January 2013 – 26 October 2017
- Prime Minister: John Key; Bill English
- Preceded by: David Carter
- Succeeded by: Portfolio disestablished

54th Minister of Immigration
- In office 14 December 2011 – 31 January 2013
- Prime Minister: John Key
- Preceded by: Jonathan Coleman
- Succeeded by: Michael Woodhouse

Member of the New Zealand Parliament for Ōtaki
- In office 8 November 2008 – 17 October 2020
- Preceded by: Darren Hughes
- Succeeded by: Terisa Ngobi
- Majority: 6,156

Member of the New Zealand Parliament for National Party List
- In office 17 September 2005 – 8 November 2008

Personal details
- Born: 1970 (age 55–56)
- Party: National
- Relations: Malcolm Guy (father)

Allen Nathan Guy (born 1970) is a New Zealand farmer and former politician. He was elected to Parliament in 2005 as a list MP for the National Party and held the Ōtaki electorate from 2008 until 2020, when he retired. Guy was Minister of Immigration from 2011 to 2013 and Minister for Primary Industries from 2013 to 2017. He now serves as the chair of the Meat Industry Association.

== Early life and family ==
Guy is a farmer from near Levin. He has been involved in various agricultural sector trusts and councils, and studied farming at Massey University. In 1999, he was the regional winner of the Kiwi dairy farmer of the year. In 2000, he travelled to the United States to study ways of increasing the value of New Zealand beef exports. By 2003, he had taken over his father's dairy farm.

Guy served eight years on the Horowhenua District Council from 1998 to 2005. His father, grandfather, and great-great-grandfather all had political careers. Guy's great-great-grandfather, Duncan Guy, was a member of the Napier Borough Council; his grandfather (also named Duncan Guy) was chairman of the Horowhenua County Council; his father, Malcolm Guy, also served as chairman of the Horowhenua County Council and was the first mayor of the Horowhenua District from 1989 to 1995. His maternal great-grandfather, Fred Nathan, was Mayor of Palmerston North from 1923 to 1927.

Guy's great-grandfather was chairman of the Wellington and Manawatu Railway Company when the last spike was driven on the company's line at Otaihanga, an event re-created on 19 February 2011 when Guy drove the last spike at the new Waikanae Railway Station opening ceremony.

== Member of Parliament ==
New Zealand Parliament
Years	Term	Electorate	List	Party
2005–2008	48th	List	39	National
2008–2011	49th	Ōtaki	18	National
2011–2014	50th	Ōtaki	20	National
2014–2017	51st	Ōtaki	16	National
2017–2020	52nd	Ōtaki	12	National

In the 2005 election, Guy was a candidate for the National Party, standing in the Ōtaki electorate and being ranked 39th on the party list. He narrowly lost the election to Labour's Darren Hughes, by a margin of 1.00% or 382 votes but entered Parliament as a list MP.

Guy's first three years in Parliament were in Opposition. He was a member of the Primary Production select committee for much of this term, and was a member of the Privileges and Standing Orders committees for about seven months until the 2008 election. When John Key became National leader in 2006, Guy became the party's junior whip and an associate spokesperson for agriculture. In February 2008, he was promoted to senior whip and continued in that position until June 2009.

In the 2008 election he was again the candidate for Ōtaki, this time defeating Hughes by 1,354 votes. Guy held the electorate three subsequent times, with his greatest majority being 7,782 votes over the Labour candidate in 2014.

=== Ministerial career ===
On 15 June 2009 Guy was selected as the new Minister of Internal Affairs, a position outside of the Cabinet, to replace Richard Worth after the latter resigned following allegations of sexual harassment. At the same time, Guy became an associate minister in the justice and transport portfolios. As internal affairs minister, Guy oversaw the merger of the National Library of New Zealand and Archives New Zealand into the Department of Internal Affairs.

Guy was involved in a controversy that was revealed in 2017. It emerged that, in 2011 as the Minister of Internal Affairs, he had granted New Zealand citizenship to US billionaire Peter Thiel after only 12 days residence (split over 4 trips in 5 years) in New Zealand. The normal residency requirement for a permanent resident to gain citizenship is 1350 days over 5 years. Thiel was granted citizenship by Guy under "exceptional circumstances" despite Thiel not having lived in the country previously and not intending to do so in the future. Thiel was the first adult to be granted New Zealand citizenship without meeting residency requirements.

On 14 December 2011, following the 2011 New Zealand general election, Guy was sworn in as the Minister of Immigration, Minister for Racing, Minister for Veterans' Affairs and Associate Minister for Primary Industries. Later that term, in January 2013, he was promoted to the role of Minister for Primary Industries, while continuing as the Minister for Racing. During his period as minister the 2013 Fonterra botulism scare and recall occurred.

=== Final term ===
Guy lost his ministerial roles when the National Party was not returned to government at the 2017 general election. In opposition, he was initially the party's spokesperson for primary industries and sat on Parliament's primary production committee. From March 2018 until his announcement on 30 July 2019 that he would not seek re-election in 2020, he was the spokesman for agriculture, biosecurity and food safety. From August 2019 until his retirement, he sat on the environment committee.

== Political views ==
Guy typically voted conservatively on social policy. He opposed same-sex marriage in 2005, by voting for the Marriage (Gender Clarification) Amendment Bill, which would have amended the Marriage Act to define marriage as only between a man and a woman, and in 2014, by voting against the Marriage (Definition of Marriage) Amendment Bill, a bill allowing same-sex couples to marry in New Zealand.

Guy also opposed the End of Life Choice Bill in 2019, which regulated assisted suicide in New Zealand, and the Abortion Legislation Bill in 2020, which decriminalised abortion.

== Post-parliamentary career ==
In November 2020, Guy contested but failed to win a seat on the board of New Zealand dairy co-operative Fonterra. He was appointed chair of Apiculture New Zealand in July 2022 and chair of the Meat Industry Association in August 2022.

New Zealand Parliament
Preceded by Darren Hughes	Member of Parliament for Ōtaki; 2008–2020	Succeeded by Terisa Ngobi
Political offices
Preceded by Richard Worth	Minister of Internal Affairs; 2009–2011	Succeeded by Amy Adams
Preceded by Richard Worth	Minister Responsible for the National Library; 2009–2011	Succeeded by Amy Adams
Preceded by Richard Worth	Minister Responsible for Archives New Zealand; 2009–2011	Succeeded by Amy Adams
Preceded by Jonathan Coleman	Minister of Immigration; 2011–2013	Succeeded by Michael Woodhouse
Preceded by David Carter	Minister for Primary Industries; 2013–2017	Succeeded by Portfolio Disestablished
