= Leonard Lowry =

New Zealand politician

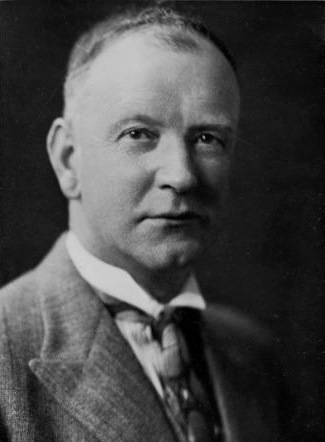

Member of the New Zealand Parliament for Otaki
- In office 1935–1946
- Preceded by: William Hughes Field
- Succeeded by: Jimmy Maher

Personal details
- Born: 1884 London, England
- Died: 21 November 1947 (aged 62–63) Auckland, New Zealand
- Party: Labour

Leonard George Lowry (1884 – 21 November 1947) was a New Zealand politician of the Labour Party.

== Biography ==
=== Early life and career ===
He was born in London in 1884. He entered the Civil Service but resigned so that he could travel abroad, settling in Lower Hutt in 1906. Before the First World War, he worked for Wellington City Council. During the war, he was on active service overseas until 1918. He was offered a job with the New Zealand Defence Force on his return, but declined, instead becoming a bookseller in Ōtaki. He remained in the job of bookseller until his death.

=== Political career ===
New Zealand Parliament
Years	Term	Electorate	Party
1935–1938	25th	Otaki	Labour
1938–1943	26th	Otaki	Labour
1943–1946	27th	Otaki	Labour

While living in Ōtaki, he was a member on various boards: the Borough Council, the Licensing Committee, and the Fire Board. In 1935, he was elected member of Parliament for Otaki, and again in 1938. Between the years of 1943 and 1945, he was the Chairman of the Maori Affairs Committee of the House. He retired from Parliament in 1946.

=== Death ===
He died on 21 November 1947 while on a family holiday to Auckland.

New Zealand Parliament
Preceded by William Hughes Field	Member of Parliament for Otaki; 1935–1946	Succeeded by Jimmy Maher
