= George O'Brien (painter) =

Irish born New Zealand painter (1821–1888)

George O'Brien (1821–30 August 1888) was an engineer of aristocratic background who turned to art in 19th century Australasia, dying in poverty but leaving a body of remarkable work.

== Biography ==
George O'Brien was born at Dromoland Castle County Clare, Ireland in 1821 he was the fifth son of Admiral Robert O'Brien, a younger son of Sir Lucius O'Brien, 3rd Baronet. George O'Brien was a first cousin of William Smith O'Brien (1803–1864) deported to Tasmania for his part in the 1848 'Young Ireland' uprising, and a cousin too of James FitzGerald, at one time Superintendent of the Canterbury Province in New Zealand.

Despite these distinguished connections the family was not well-heeled. Young George O'Brien may have been trained by a brother as a civil engineer. His parents died when he was young and it seems that by a very early age he was in Melbourne, Australia. Views of the town dated 1839 and 1840 survive in the collection of the state library. It seems he left soon afterwards but was back by 1850 arriving from London on the Midlothian. He worked as a draughtsman in the surveyor's office and in 1853 married Jane Mashford at St. James' church Melbourne. He was active in the Victoria Fine Arts Society and by 1854 was advertising his services as an architect and surveyor. He exhibited paintings in 1856 and 1858 and nine signed and dated watercolours of St. Kilda and nearby places in Melbourne are recorded.

By December 1863 O'Brien was living at Duncan Street in Dunedin New Zealand no doubt attracted by the prosperity induced by the Otago gold rushes. He worked as a civil engineer; was employed at times by the Town Board and supplied architectural perspectives of buildings designed by several Dunedin firms. He seems to have had more than a nodding acquaintance with R.A. Lawson. A number of O'Brien's watercolours were exhibited in the 1865 New Zealand Industrial Exhibition.

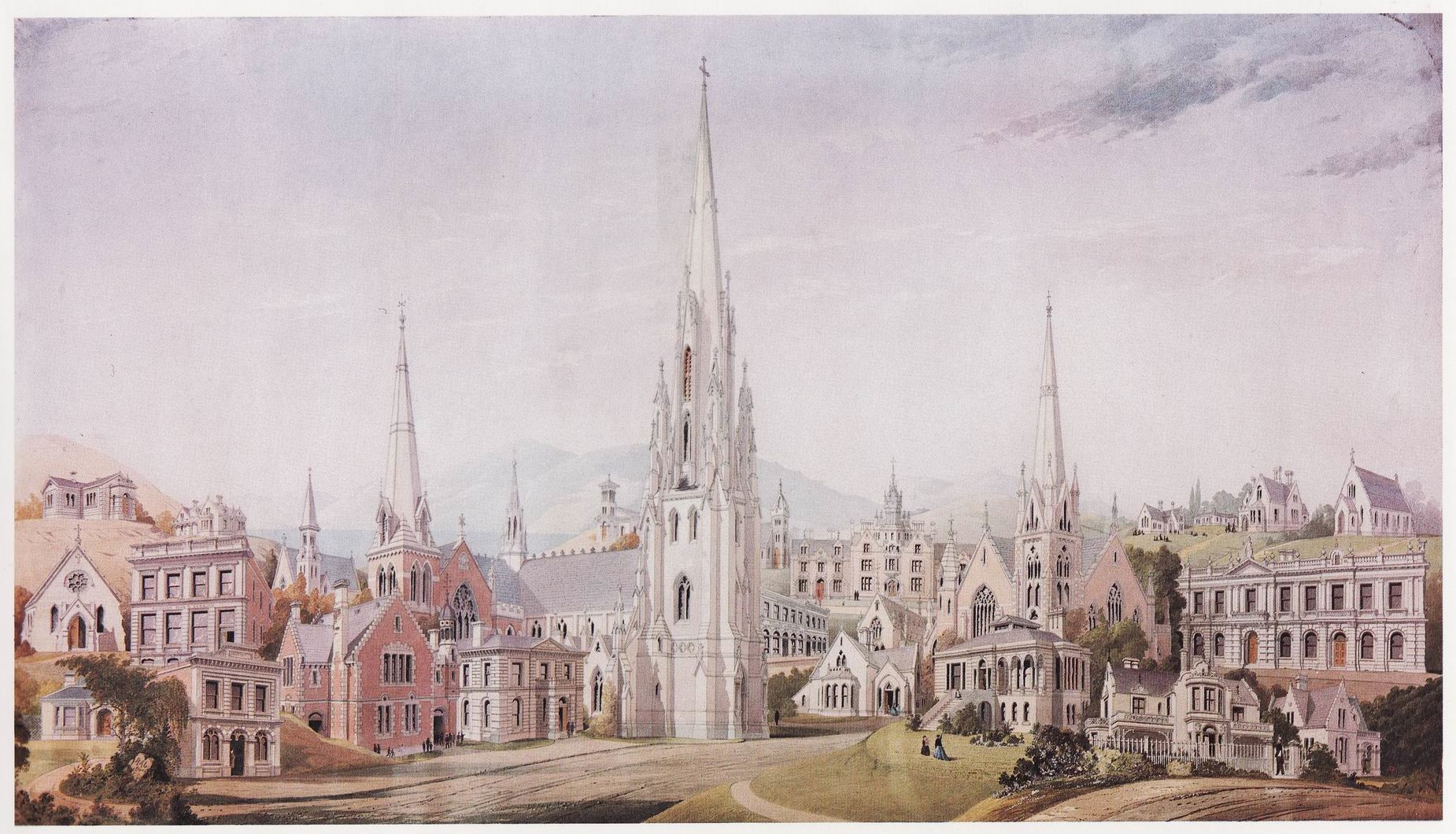
O'Brien's watercolour of the designs of R.A. Lawson 1860s

He associated with W.M. Hodgkins, a lawyer and aspiring watercolour painter who became very influential in Dunedin's art world. O'Brien may have given Hodgkins some instruction. O'Brien's manner showed his background in measured draughtsmanship but also represented a kind of neo-classical painting. In the colonial context he was unusual in taking buildings and townscape as his subject matter. In 1876 he attended a meeting of the Otago Art Society and was well represented in that body's inaugural annual exhibition held later that year. His paintings were ill-received by one critic, probably Thomas Bracken, which represents the arrival in New Zealand of the new taste for Turneresque Romantic landscape and the beginning of the demise of O'Brien's more old-fashioned neo-classicism. Nevertheless, when O'Brien's wife died in 1879, leaving him with five daughters to raise, he embarked on a career as a professional artist.

He was versatile and energetic travelling around southern New Zealand, but also a heavy drinker and immensely fat. His habits were bohemian and eventually his oldest daughter, now married, removed her younger siblings while O'Brien continued lodging with a sailor and his wife in a poor part of the city. He spent a year in Auckland in 1887 but returned to Dunedin where he died on 30 August 1888. His landlady inherited his residual collection and he was interred in a then unmarked grave in the northern cemetery.

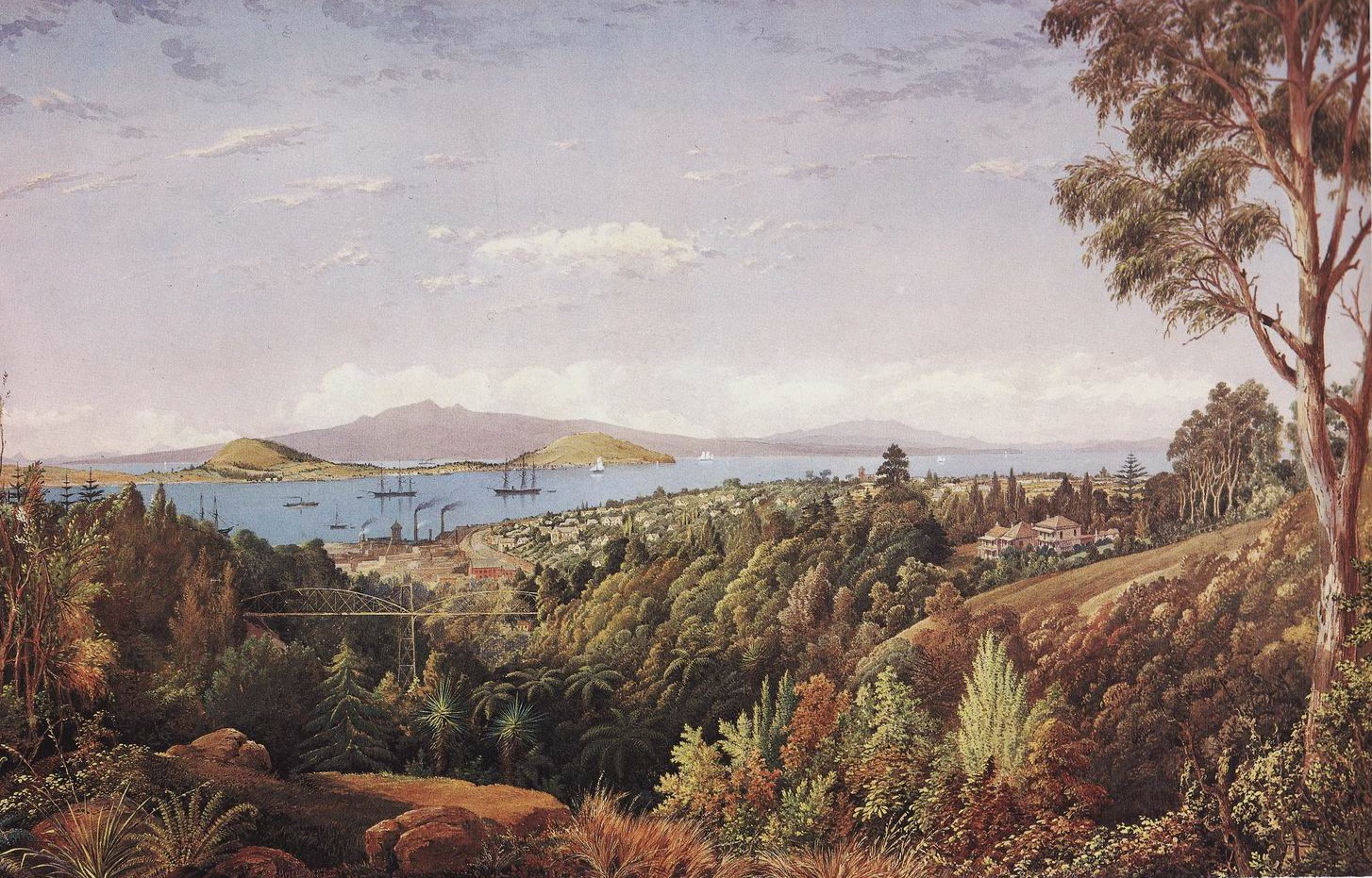
O'Brien's view of Auckland and the old Grafton bridge, 1887.

== Legacy ==
Following his death, O'Brien's reputation improved. While contemporaries such as Rodney Kennedy and Colin McCahon hailed O'Brien as a topographer untouched by artistic fashion, he was in fact a highly able neo-classical painter with a most unusual urban vision.

The late 20th century saw a number of exhibitions toured around the country and new studies of his work. In 1945, the Hocken Library held an exhibition of drawings and paintings by O'Brien and Lily Daff. John Harris of the Otago University Library wrote in the catalogue that O'Brien's 'combination of skilled draughtsmanship and genuine feeling for the pattern and colour of our hills and bush and harbour give [his works] historical as well as artistic significance'.

His 'Designs of R.A.Lawson', now in the Otago Settlers Museum Dunedin, is often reproduced and his 'Dunedin from the Junction' 1869, in the same repository, is well known. His 'Water of Leith Brewery' of about 1865 (also in the Otago Settlers Museum) is an excellent example of his urban vision while 'Lawyer's Head from Forbury Head...' of 1870, in the collection of the Dunedin Public Art Gallery represents his pure landscape work somewhere near its best. He is represented in the State Library of Victoria, Melbourne, the National Gallery of Victoria Melbourne, and in all the major New Zealand public collections, but most notably in the Otago Settlers Museum and the Hocken Collections, Dunedin.
