= W. M. Hodgkins =

New Zealand artist (1833–1898)

William Mathew Hodgkins
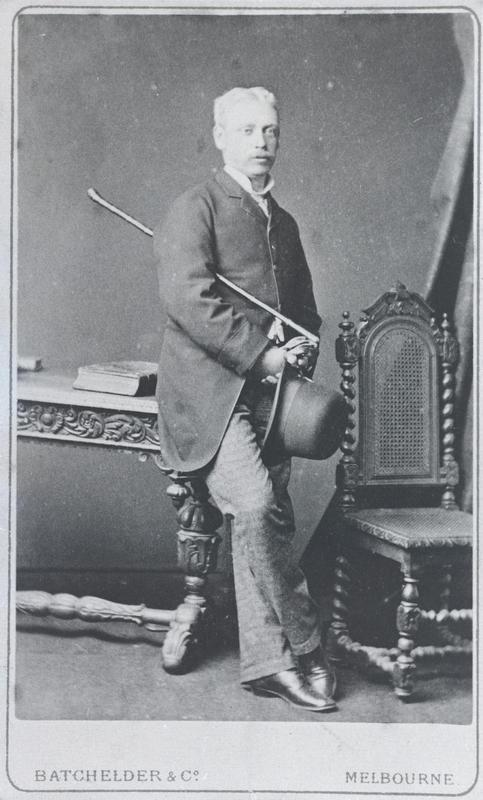
- Hodgkins c. 1873
- Born: 23 September 1833; Liverpool, United Kingdom
- Died: 9 February 1898 (aged 64); Dunedin, New Zealand
- Children: 2

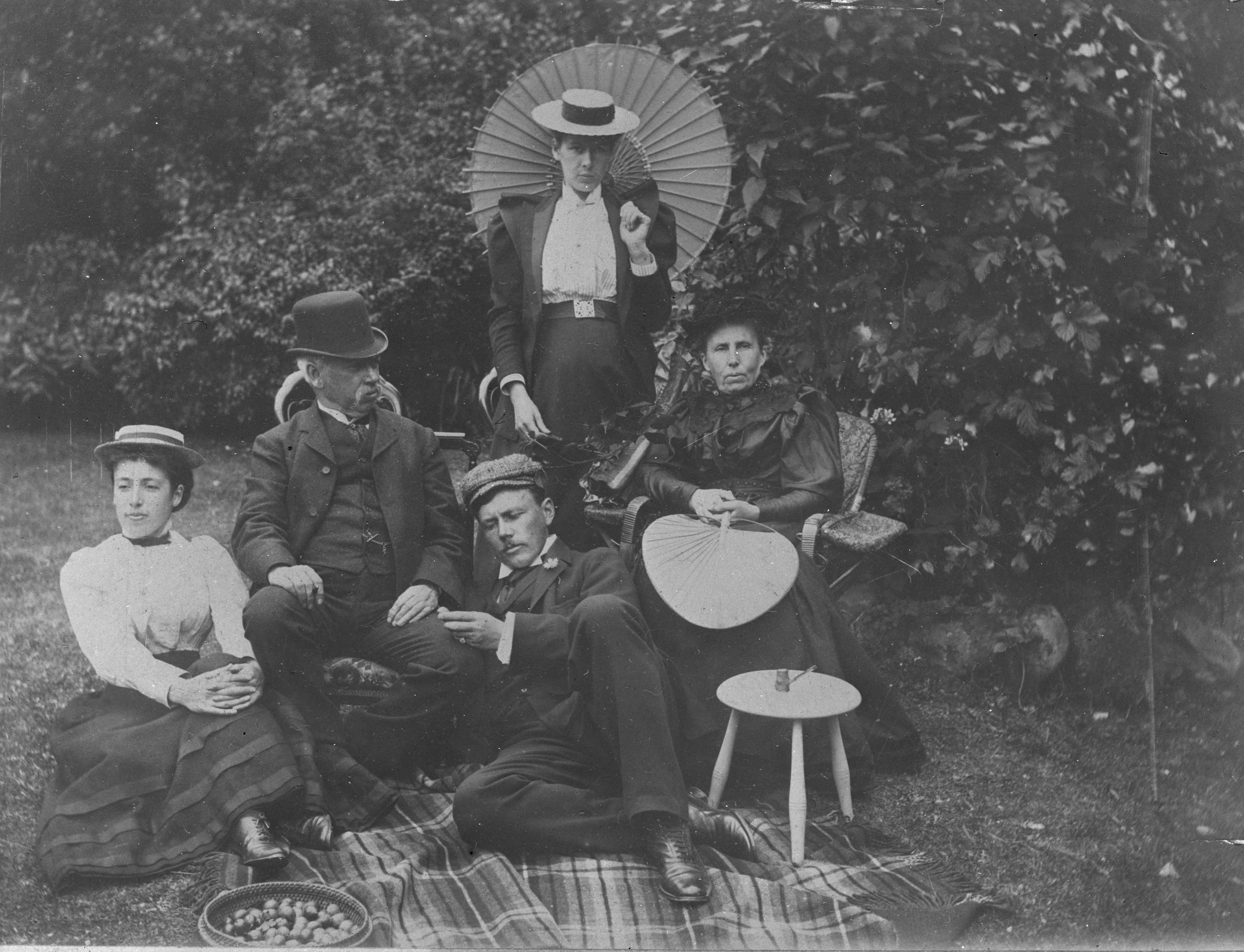
W. M. Hodgkins with some of his family in 1892: daughters Frances (left) and Isabel (holding Japanese sunshade), his wife Rachael, and his future son-in-law William Field

William Mathew Hodgkins (23 September 1833 – 9 February 1898) was a 19th-century New Zealand painter.

He was a leading advocate of art in Dunedin and founded New Zealand's first art gallery in the city. He was a considerable water colour painter in his own right. According to his daughter Frances Hodgkins, he was the 'father of art in New Zealand.' He encouraged both his daughters in their art practices and Frances went on to become regarded as Britain's most distinguished woman artist at the time of her death and is still New Zealand's best regarded expatriate painter.

== Life ==
Baptised in Liverpool 23 September 1833 in the heart of the city's slums he was the son of a brushmaker, also called William Hodgkins. His mother had been Jane Grocott or Groocock and his sister Jane was born in 1835. William Mathew went to school at Staveley, Derbyshire and his exercise book in penmanship survives, prefiguring his adult career as a law clerk and lawyer and his lifelong interest in graphics. By 1852 his father was in business in Birmingham but William Mathew was a law clerk in London. He lived in Holborn, worked for Waterlow and Sons, famous printers of stamps and bank notes, and for the Patent Office. By 1855 he was in Paris where he assisted in 'literary work' at Versailles, perhaps copying correspondence or graphic works. Back in London about 1857 he studied Turner's paintings and other artists, at Hampton Court and the National Gallery. In 1859 he worked at the National Portrait Gallery in London.

Sometime between 1856 and 1858 Hodgkins's family emigrated to Melbourne in Australia. In 1859 he followed them on the White Star whose surgeon was Thomas Hocken. By April 1862 Hodgkins had left Melbourne and was living in Dunedin.

He worked as an ornamental writer and then for Gillies and Richmond, no doubt as a law clerk. He met Rachel Owen Parker and married her at St. Paul's Cathedral, Dunedin, 19 September 1865. He was admitted to the Otago Bar in 1868.

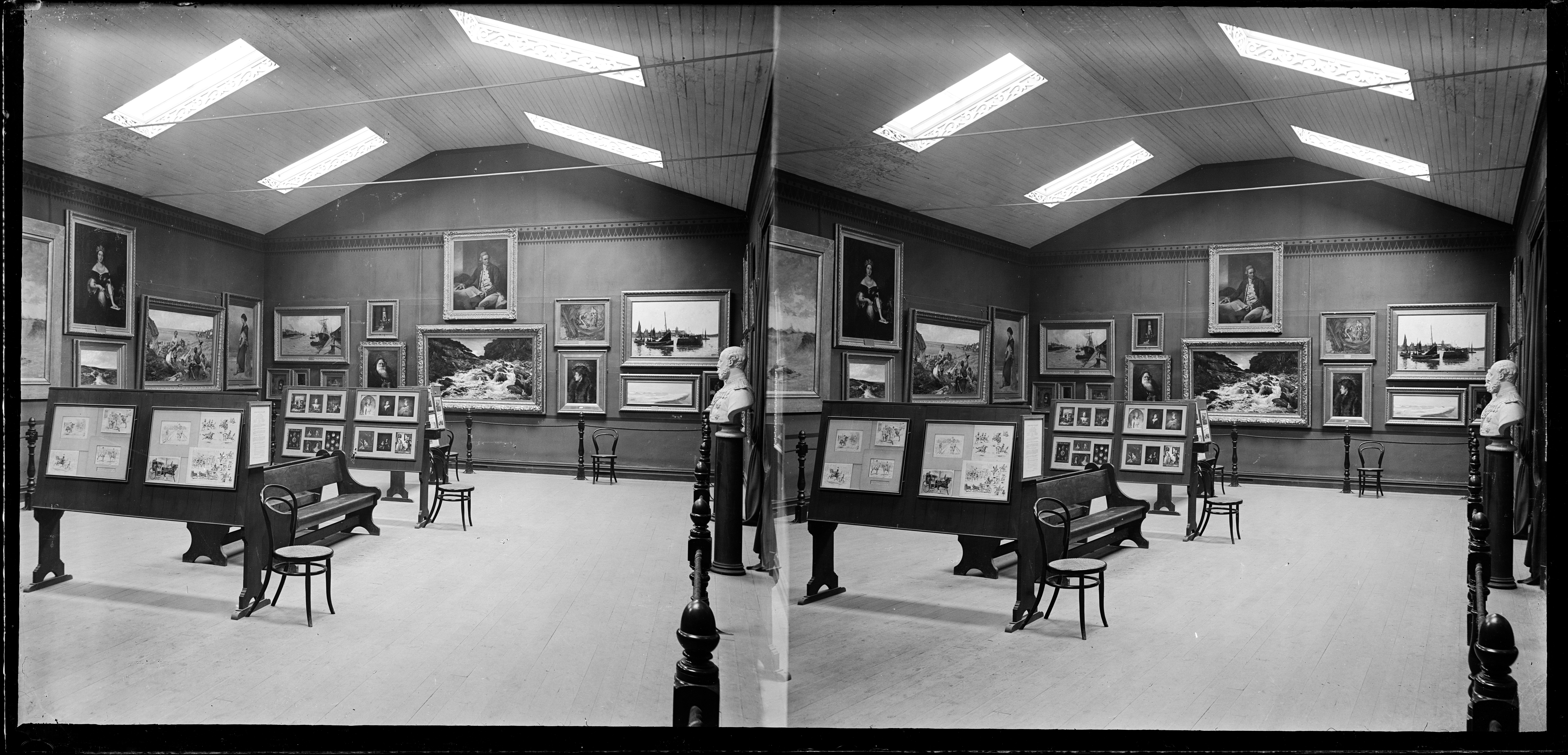
Dunedin Art Gallery (1890s)

Hodgkins earliest known painting is dated 1862. It is not known how he learnt the craft but his association with George O'Brien may be significant. He did not exhibit in the New Zealand Industrial Exhibition, held in Dunedin in 1865 but took charge of its photographic department. He organised a Fine Arts exhibition in Dunedin in 1869 with the aim of starting a public art gallery. That did not happen but in 1875 he founded what soon became the Otago Art Society. Although there was resistance to his plans to start an art gallery under his presidency in 1881 the society started to collect pictures. In 1882 its council agreed to start a 'national collection of works of art'. A resolution of 14 October 1884 effectively founded the Dunedin Public Art Gallery the first institution of its kind in New Zealand.

Hodgkins's career as a lawyer went into decline. In 1884 he moved his family from a house in Royal Terrace, a good address in the city, to a rented cottage at Ravensbourne, a harbourside suburb. In 1888 he was declared bankrupt. Hodgkins struggled out of these difficulties, eventually moving the family back to a large rented house in town. He was involved in organising the art department of the New Zealand and South Seas Exhibition held in Dunedin in 1889. In the same year he proposed the idea of a government-funded national gallery with collections in each of the four main centres. While that did not happen, the collection of the Dunedin gallery was augmented from the exhibition, a new building erected, and a support group was founded: the Dunedin Public Art Gallery Society.

Hodgkins' own art had developed considerably. An accomplished landscape painter in the Romantic manner of Turner the most notable characteristic of his work is its use of colour. New styles were brought to New Zealand in 1890 by G. P. Nerli, Petrus Van der Velden and J. M. Nairn. Hodgkins embraced the newcomers and with Nerli in Dunedin the resulting twin circles of painters made the city for a while the foremost centre of art in New Zealand.

Hodgkins died in Dunedin on 9 February 1898, survived by his wife, two daughters and four sons. He left his family poor but they and the community remembered a cheerful, persevering, ambitious man. The society and the public gallery he had founded endured and prospered. He had published the first considered statement of any length on New Zealand art and he left behind a body of works the best of which are among the best of their kind in New Zealand. The Southern Alps of New Zealand.. of 1885 is often mentioned; The South Canterbury Plains from near Peel Forest of 1882 is remarkable for its breadth and simplicity. Both are now in the collection of the Dunedin Public Art Gallery. Hodgkins's daughters Isabel, and particularly his younger daughter Frances, furthered his interest in art. In retrospect Frances's estimation of him does not seem exaggerated. He is undoubtedly one of New Zealand's most influential artistic figures of the 19th century.

His daughter Isabel, also known as Cissy, married William Hughes Field in 1893.

== Gallery ==
Works by W. M. Hodgkins

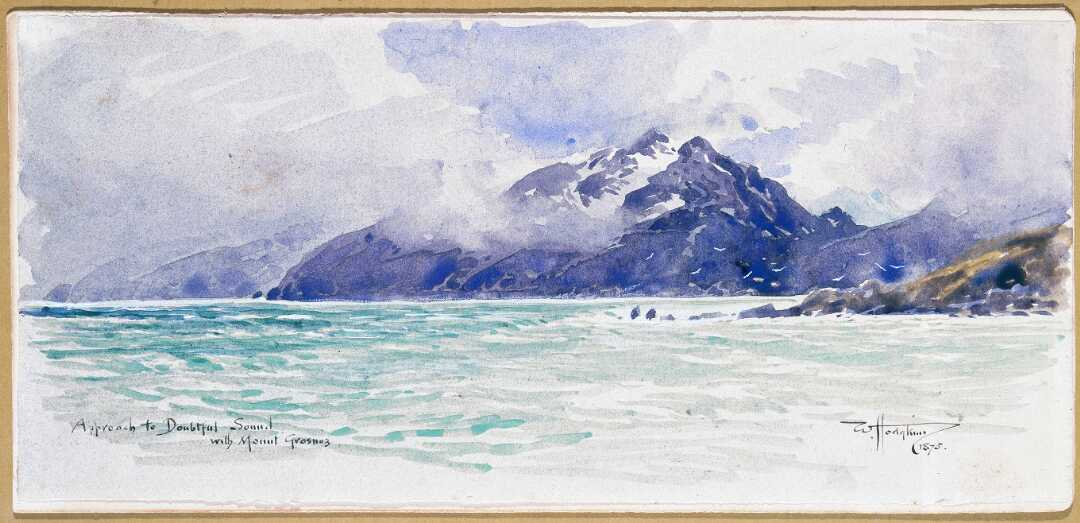
Approach to Doubtful Sound with Mount Grosnez, 1875

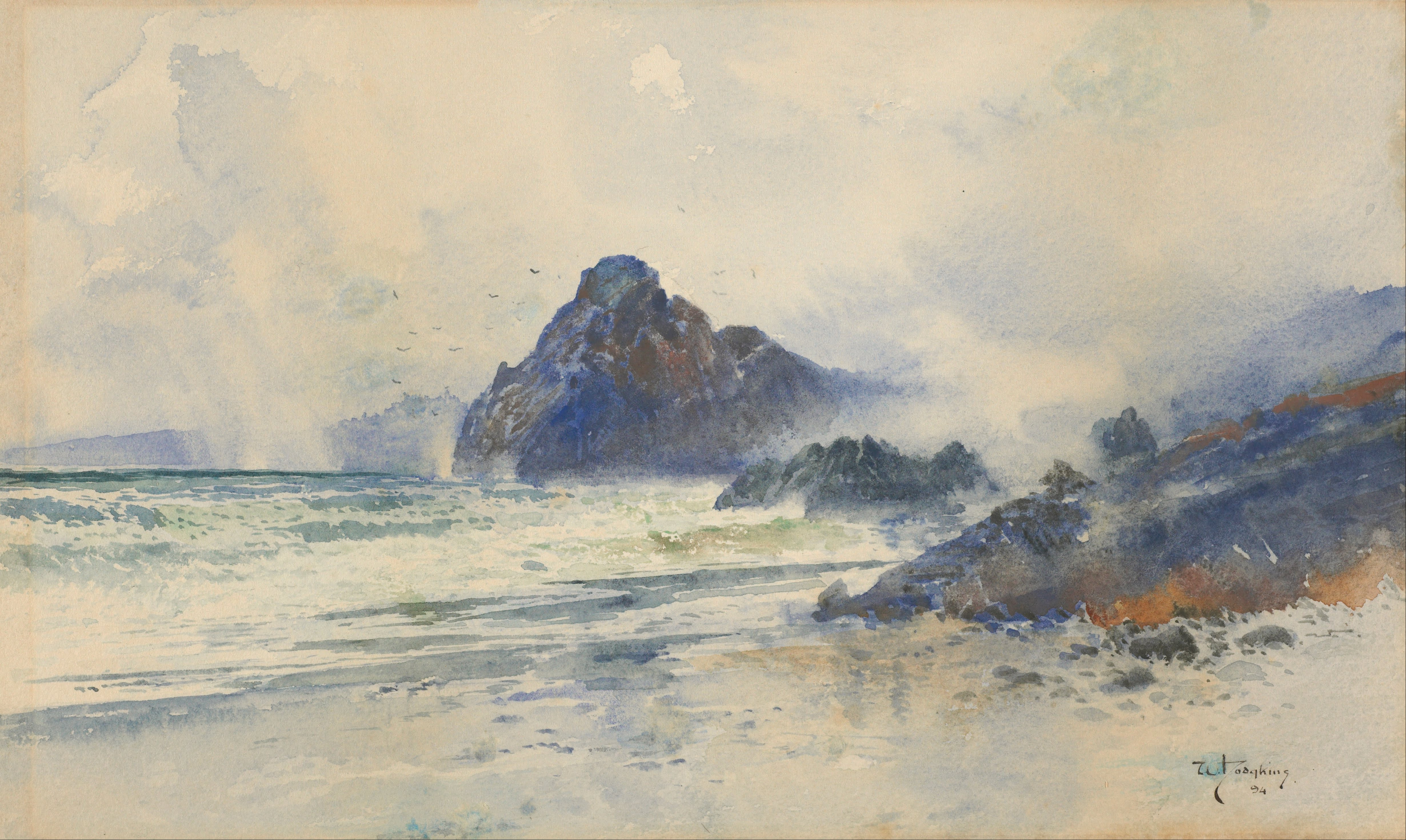
A wet day on a wild coast, 1894

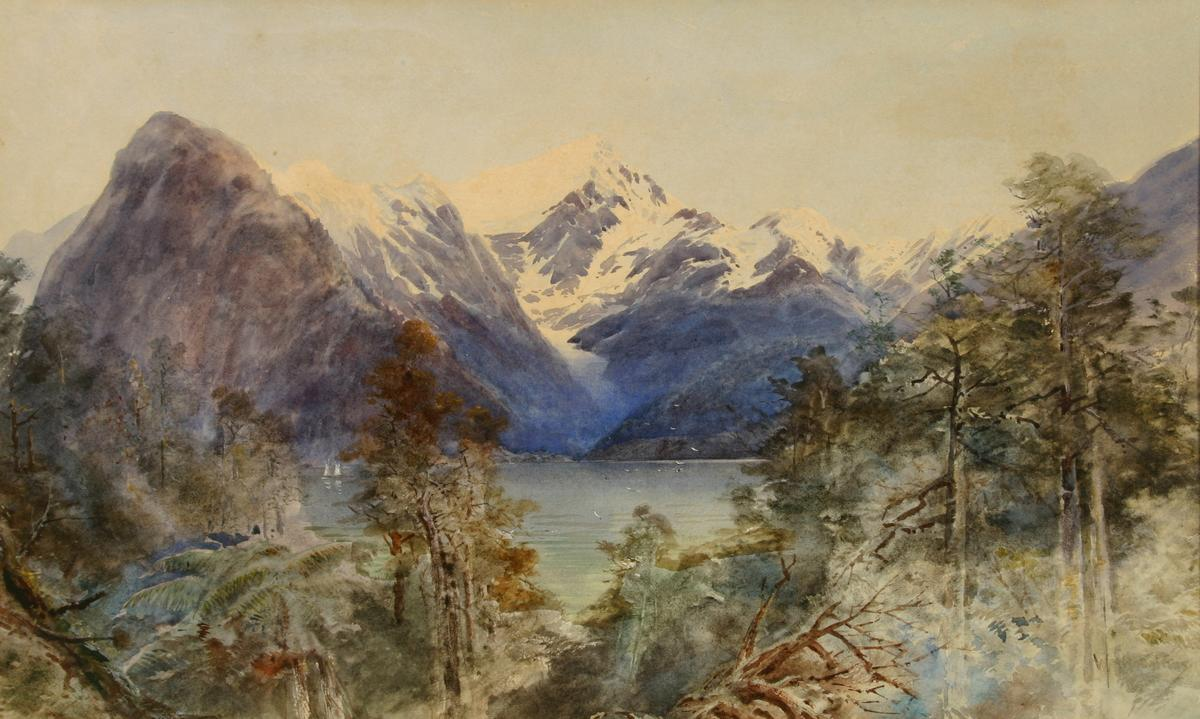
Milford Sound

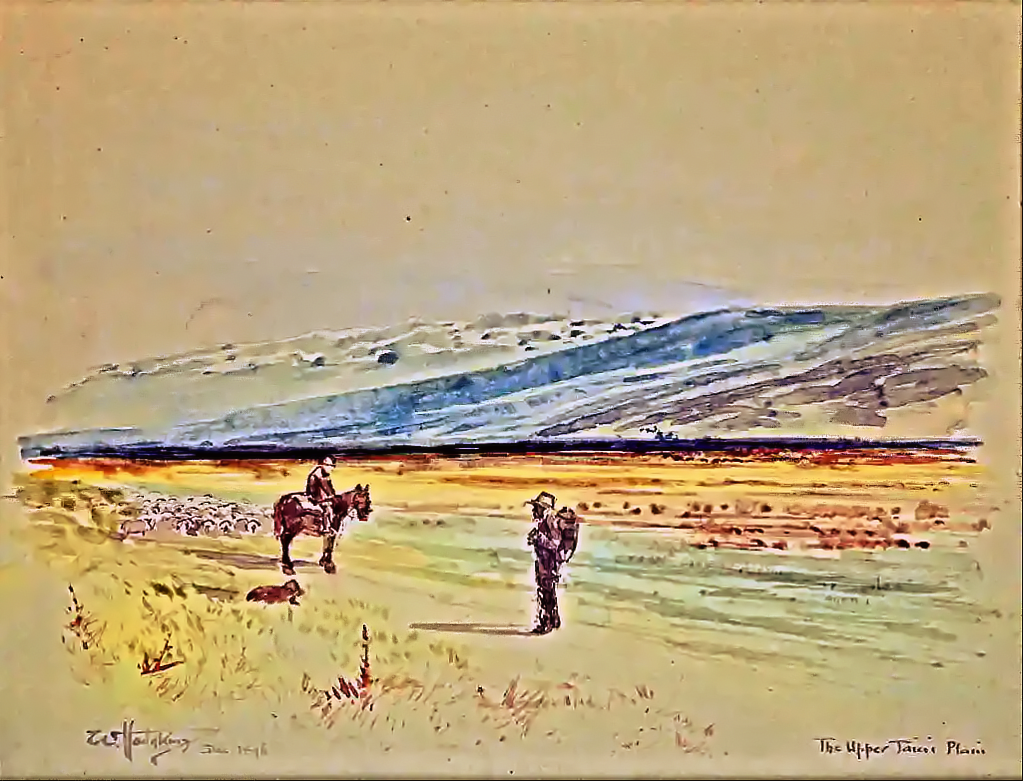
The Upper Taieri Plains, 1896
