= 1900 Otaki by-election =

New Zealand by-election

Otaki by-election of 1900
- 6 January 1900
- Turnout: 62.35%
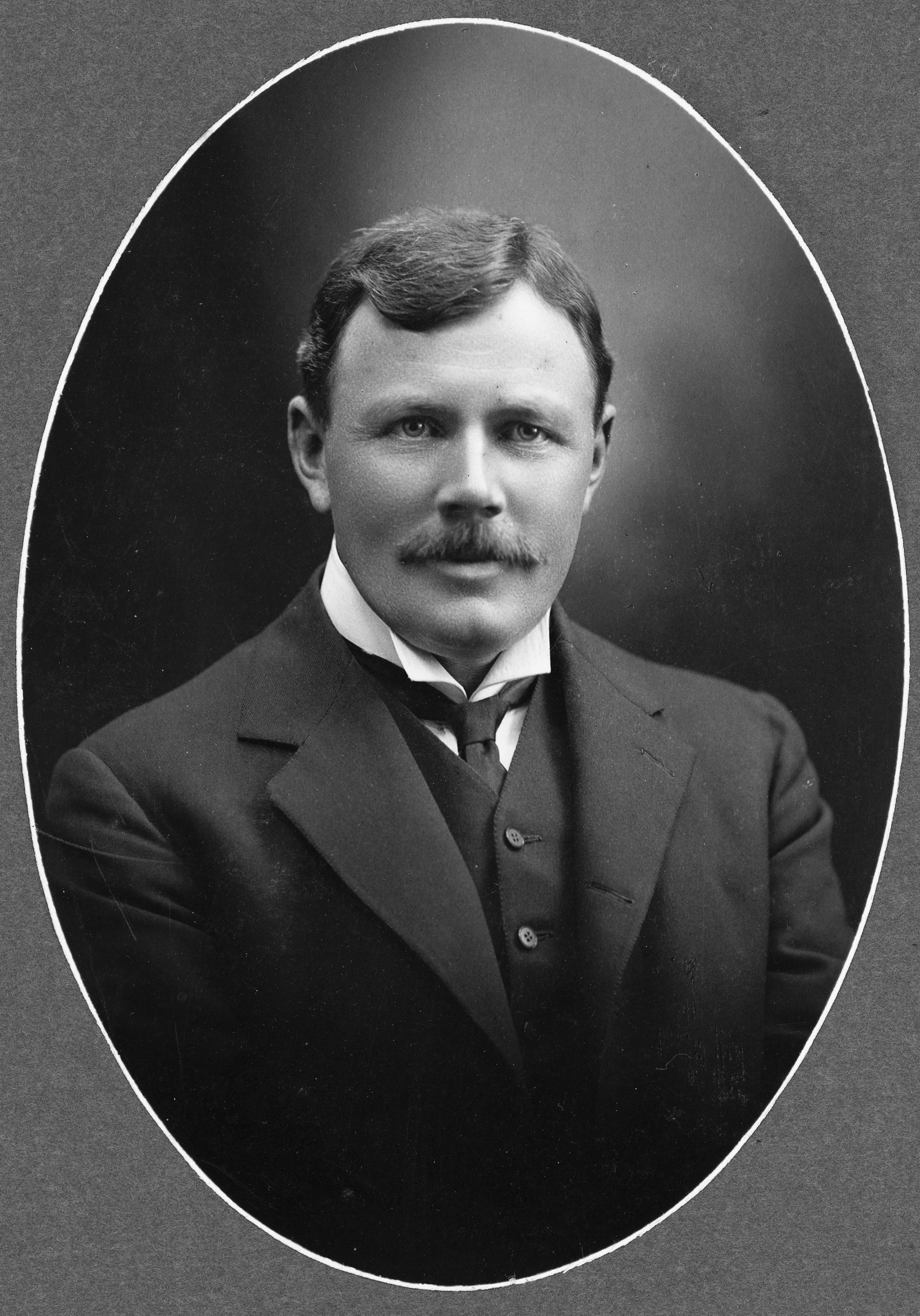

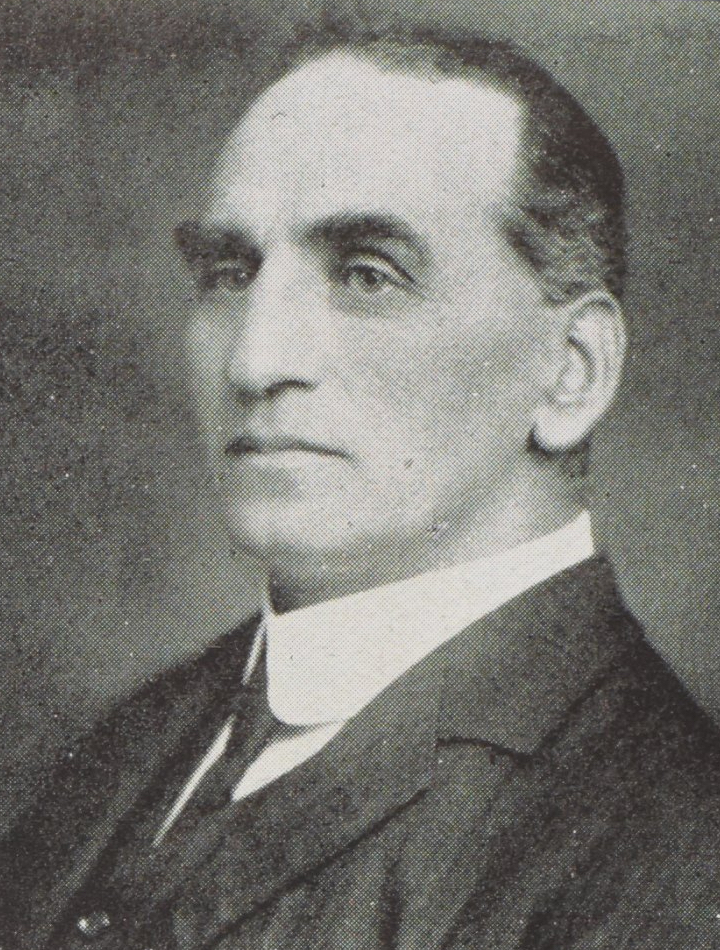
Candidate	William Hughes Field	Charles Morison
Party	Liberal	Conservative
Popular vote	1,755	1,592
Percentage	52.44	47.56
Member before election
Henry Augustus Field
Liberal
Elected Member
William Hughes Field
Liberal

The Otaki by-election of 1900 was a by-election during the 14th New Zealand Parliament. The election was held on 6 January following the death of Henry Augustus Field, and was won by his brother William Hughes Field.

== Background ==
The Otaki electorate became vacant following the death on 8 December of Henry Augustus Field, two days after the 1899 election. Before candidates had announced themselves, it was reported that Kennedy Macdonald was considering standing for the Liberal Party. The barrister Edwin Jellicoe was also mentioned as a possible candidate. It was reported that it was likely that the brother of the deceased, William Hughes Field, would be asked to stand for the Liberal Party. The president of the Eighty Club, T. Dwan, was mentioned as a possible candidate for the opposition. The barrister Charles Morison, who had contested the 1899 general election, was a likely candidate again. William Field consented just after his brother's funeral, and the Liberal Party confirmed that had Field not been their candidate, they would have stood W. Ross of Upper Hutt as their candidate.

The deadline for nomination of candidates was 30 December 1899. In the end, only two candidates were nominated: William Field for the Liberal Party, and Charles Morison in the interests of the opposition.

The by-election was held on 6 January and was won by Field's brother William, who during the campaign showed that he was inexperienced in politics.

== Results ==
The following table gives the election results:

1900 Otaki by-election
Party	Candidate	Votes	%	±%
Liberal	William Hughes Field	1,755	52.44	
Conservative	Charles Morison	1,592	47.56	+2.09
Majority		163	4.87	−4.18
Turnout		3,347	62.35	−0.45
Registered electors		5,368		
