= Tim Costley =

New Zealand air force officer and politician

Tim Costley MP
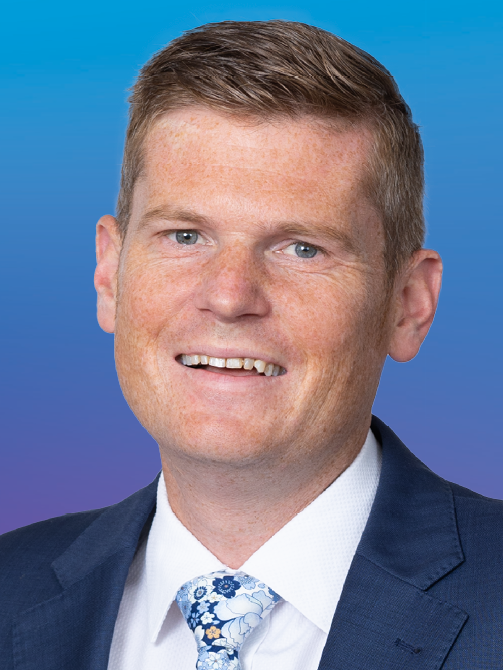
- Costley in 2023

Member of the New Zealand Parliament for Ōtaki
- Incumbent
- Assumed office 14 October 2023
- Preceded by: Terisa Ngobi

Personal details
- Born: 1979 or 1980 (age 46–47)
- Party: National
- Children: 3
- Education: Massey University; Cranfield University

Military service
- Allegiance: New Zealand
- Branch/service: Royal New Zealand Air Force
- Years of service: 2001–2023
- Rank: Wing commander

Timothy John Costley (born 1979/1980) is a New Zealand politician. He was elected as the Member of Parliament in the House of Representatives for Ōtaki, representing the National Party, in the 2023 general election. He was previously a pilot with the Royal New Zealand Air Force (RNZAF).

== Early life and education ==
Costley was raised in Palmerston North by his parents, who were both teachers. He has one sister and one brother and was educated at Palmerston North Boys' High School. He studied at Massey University, graduating with a Bachelor of Science degree in mathematical physics, and at Cranfield University in the United Kingdom where he earned a master's degree in international defence and security. He also has a Diploma in Business.

== Military career ==
Costley joined the Royal New Zealand Air Force (RNZAF) in 2001 as a pilot. He operated Bell UH-1 Iroquois and NHIndustries NH90 helicopters. He saw operational flying service in the Solomon Islands and East Timor. He also completed a tour of duty in Afghanistan and was involved in numerous rescue missions in New Zealand and humanitarian missions in both Fiji and Papua New Guinea. Costley was second-in-command of pilot training and command of the NH90 helicopters for the RNZAF. In 2014, Costley was seconded as an equerry to Prince William, Duke of Cambridge, as an officer of the British royal household assisting members of the royal family. He later achieved the rank of wing commander and finished his career as Commanding Officer of the Flying Training Wing at Ohakea airbase.

In 2007, while Costley was stationed in East Timor, he featured in a tongue-in-cheek video that went viral online and was later used for RNZAF recruitment.

Costley founded The Missing Wingman Trust, a charity that supports the families of RNZAF families where someone is killed, wounded, injured or ill.

== Member of Parliament ==
New Zealand Parliament
Years	Term	Electorate	List	Party
2023–2026	54th	Ōtaki	64	National
2026–present	55th	Kapiti	37	National

In November 2019, Costley was selected as the National Party candidate for the Ōtaki electorate at the 2020 general election. He lost to Labour Party candidate Terisa Ngobi by 2,988 votes.

=== First term, 2023–2026 ===
Costley was again selected to run as the National Party candidate in the Ōtaki electorate during the 2023 New Zealand general election. Final results showed a "commanding win", with Costley receiving over 22,145 votes, a lead of more than 6,271 votes over Ngobi. Costley gave his maiden statement in Parliament on 12 December 2023. He currently sits on the foreign affairs, defence and trade committee and the governance and administration committee.

In June 2024, Costley attracted media attention after claiming over NZ$36,000 worth of housing allowance to live in a Wellington apartment that he owned. In response to criticism, Prime Minister and National Party leader Christopher Luxon defended Costley, stating that Members of Parliament often left late at night and that his 58 km (36 mi) commute to his home in Waikanae was impractical.

In March 2025, Costley made a controversial remark in Parliament referencing the openly gay former Finance Minister, Grant Robertson. Costley stated: "Geez, we had it during the last one, you were getting told how long you're allowed to stay in the shower. I don't like the thought of Grant Robertson inspecting me in the shower, quite frankly. But this is the attitude they've just purveyed from that side of the House." The comment was widely criticised as being inappropriate and he was required to apologise by party leadership.

=== Second term, 2026–present ===
During the 2026 New Zealand general election, Costley contested Kapiti for National. He was ranked 37th on the National Party list. Based on preliminary results, Costley retained Kapiti by a margin of 2,077 votes.

In response to the planned closure of the Kapiti Coast Airport on 30 November 2026, Costley criticised the owners' decision to close the airport, stating: "We need the airport for resilience in times of crisis, for life-saving services now and for regional connectivity."

== Personal life ==
Costley and his wife Emma have three daughters.

New Zealand Parliament
Preceded by Terisa Ngobi	Member of Parliament for Ōtaki; 2023–present	Incumbent
