= Henry Augustus Field =

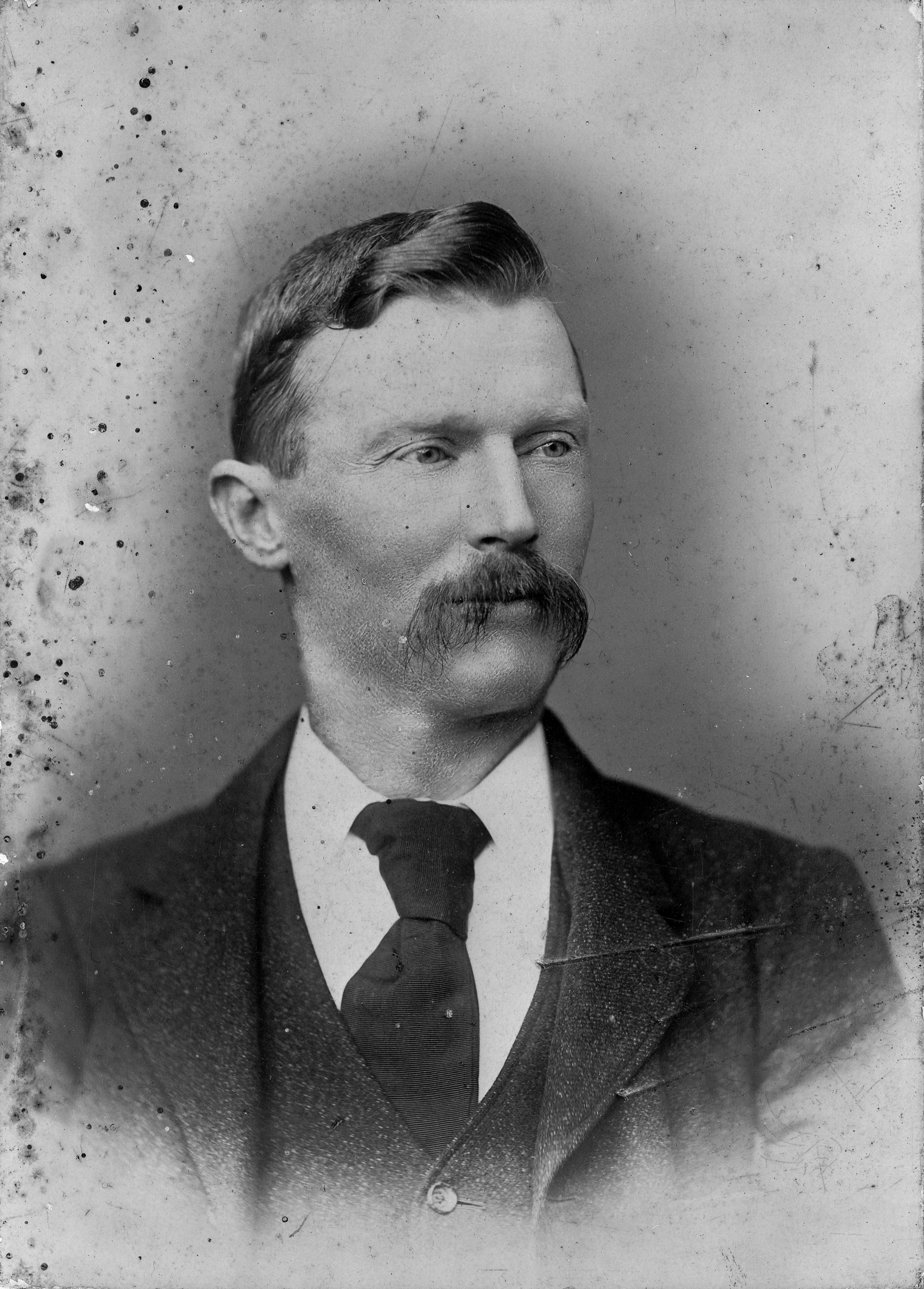
- Henry Augustus Field in 1897

Member of the New Zealand Parliament for Otaki
- In office 4 December 1896 – 8 December 1899
- Preceded by: James Wilson
- Succeeded by: William Hughes Field

Personal details
- Born: 1852 Wanganui, New Zealand
- Died: 8 December 1899 (aged 48)
- Party: Liberal Party
- Spouse: Hannah Field (m. 1879)
- Occupation: Surveyor, farmer, politician

Henry Augustus Field (1852 – 8 December 1899) was a Liberal Party Member of Parliament in New Zealand. By profession a surveyor, he retired in his late 20s due to rheumatism and became a farmer. He died in office just two days after having won his second parliamentary election.

== Biography ==
New Zealand Parliament
Years	Term	Electorate	Party
1896–1899	13th	Otaki	Liberal
1899	14th	Otaki	Liberal

Field was born in Wanganui in 1852, the son of Henry Claylands Field (1825–1912) and his wife Margaret Symes Puslow. His father was a civil engineer from Holybourne, Hampshire, England, who had come to Wanganui in the early 1850s. H. A. Field received a private education at Wanganui. He became a survey cadet in 1868 and qualified in 1872. Together with his Christchurch cousin, D. H. Monro, he surveyed the Upper Whanganui River and the Taupo District immediately following the New Zealand Wars. He retired from surveying in 1878 as he suffered from rheumatism and moved to Waikanae, where he was farming.

On 28 October 1879 at Waikanae, Field married Hannah Erskine, the daughter of Thomas Wilson.

He won the Otaki electorate in the Horowhenua District in the 1896 general election. He was ill during the 1899 session and could not attend the parliamentary sittings on many occasions. Against medical advice, he contested the 1899 general election on 6 December, visibly ill at many of the meetings. He died two days after his re-election at his home in Waikanae. His brother, William Hughes Field, won the resulting by-election on 6 January 1900. Hannah Field died in September 1904.

New Zealand Parliament
Preceded by James Wilson	Member of Parliament for Otaki; 1896–1899	Succeeded by William Hughes Field
