= Southern Crossing =

Hiking trail on North Island, New Zealand

Coordinates: 40.874°S 175.235°E

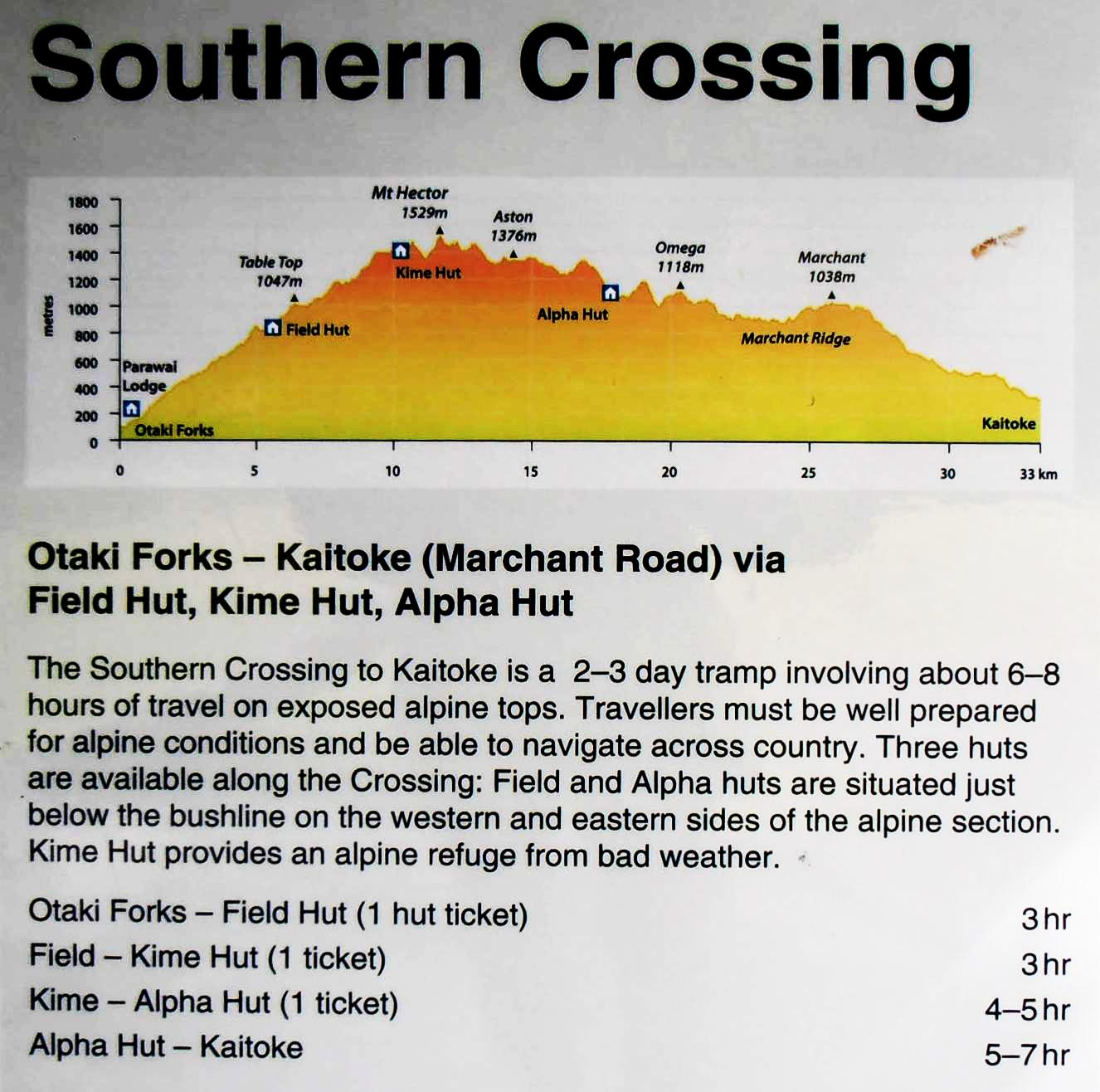
View

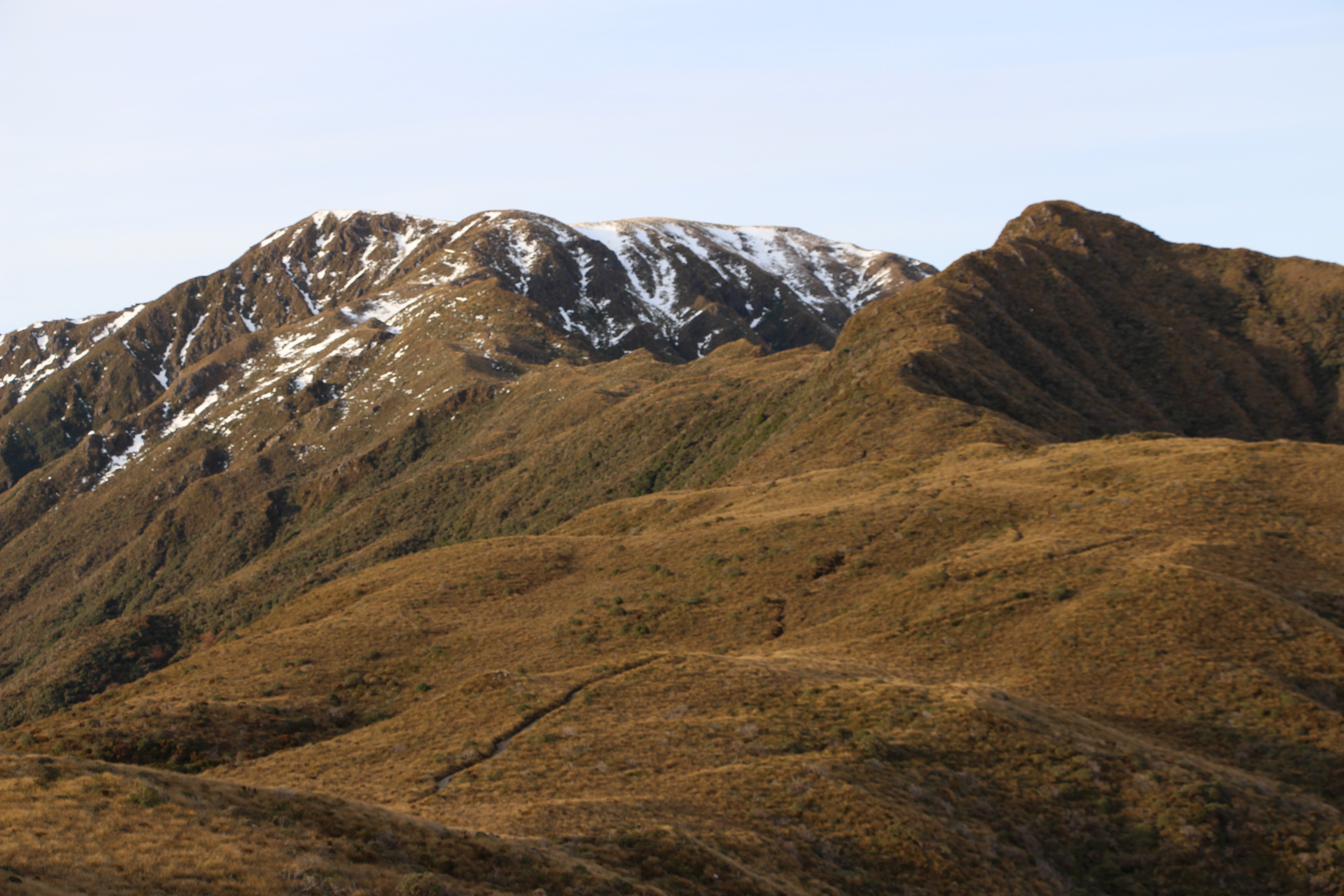
Track between Field Hut and Kime Hut

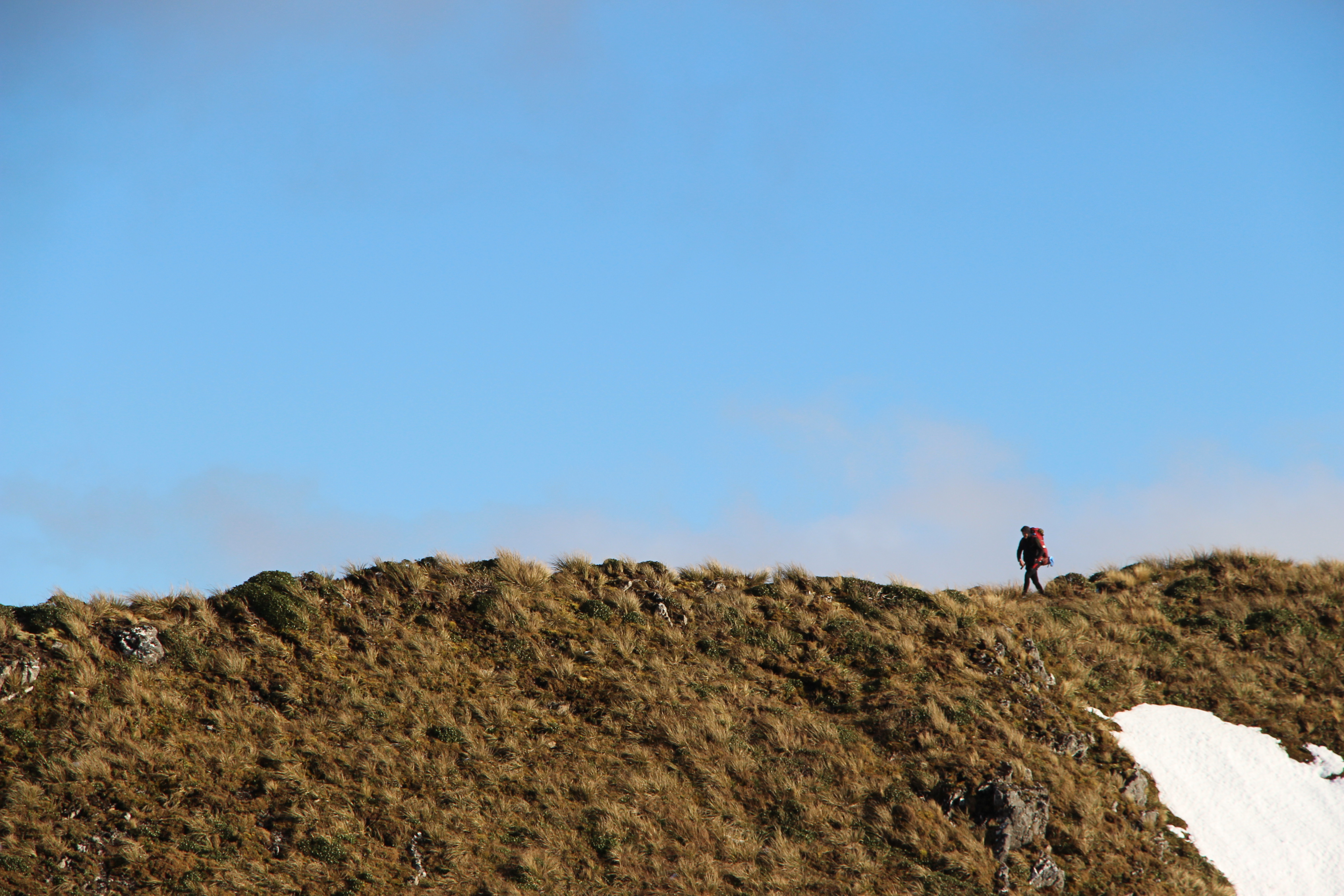
A tramper crossing the ridge close to Kime Hut

The Southern Crossing is a tramping track in New Zealand's Tararua Range. The track is approximately 32 kilometres (20 mi) long and typically takes two to three days to complete. It begins in Ōtaki Forks in the west, and continues over Mount Hector finishing in Kaitoke north of Upper Hutt.

== History ==
In 1915 Alpha Hut was built followed two years later by the construction of Tauherenikau Hut. This established the first "Southern Crossing" route. Traditionally it finished in Walls Whare, near Greytown, which was a true crossing of the ranges.

== Track description ==
The track starts at Ōtaki forks, proceeding to Kime Hut via Field Hut. From there, the track goes to the highest point of the route, Mount Hector (1529 m), which has a wooden cross in memory of trampers who died in the Second World War. Mt Hector also affords panoramic views of the Wellington and Wairarapa regions. From here the track continues south via a number of other sub-alpine peaks on the way to Alpha hut. From Alpha hut the last leg of the track follows Marchant Ridge to Kaitoke.

The track is mostly unformed with steep, rocky or muddy sections.

== See also ==
- New Zealand tramping tracks
