= Ōtaki (electorate) =

- Single-member general constituency for the New Zealand House of Representatives
- Formation: 1893, 1996
- Region: Wellington; Manawatū-Whanganui
- Character: Rural
- Term: 3 years

Member for Ōtaki

Ōtaki (previously Otaki) was a New Zealand electorate, returning a single member to the New Zealand House of Representatives. The final MP for Ōtaki was Tim Costley of the New Zealand National Party. He held this position from the 2023 election to the 2026 election.

The electorate was abolished ahead of the 2026 general election.

== Population centres ==
The Ōtaki electorate was a coastal electorate in the lower North Island, centred on the southern Horowhenua district and northern Kāpiti Coast district. Its northern boundary near Foxton and Levin was with the Rangitīkei electorate. On the east it joined the Wairarapa electorate in the Tararua Range. The southern boundary was with Mana (bisecting Paraparaumu) and Remutaka.

Population centres within the electorate included the towns of Ōtaki, Waikanae, Waitarere, Manakau and Peka Peka.

== History ==
=== 1892 to 1972 ===
In the 1892 electoral redistribution, population shift to the North Island required the transfer of one seat from the South Island to the north. The resulting ripple effect saw every electorate established in 1890 have its boundaries altered, and eight electorates were established for the first time, including Otaki. Otaki was first contested in the 1893 election, and the first member for Otaki was James Wilson, who held the seat for one term until 1896. It was then won by Henry Augustus Field and then, after Henry's death, by his brother William Hughes Field. William Field, a Liberal-turn-independent-turn-Reform, held it for a total of 32 years, from 1900 to 1935. Field lost the electorate in 1911 to John Robertson of the Social Democratic Party (who had been nominated by the flax-workers union), but won it back in 1914.

The seat was abolished in 1972, and Allan McCready, who was the incumbent, instead stood for and won the Manawatu electorate.

=== 1996 to 2026 ===
Otaki was recreated ahead of the change to mixed-member proportional (MMP) voting in 1996, by combining two bellwether seats: the northern half of Kapiti with the entire Horowhenua seat. Its boundaries have been largely unchanged by boundary reviews. The 2007 boundary review revised the electorate's spelling (Ōtaki, with a leading macron). The 2014 boundary review transferred Shannon and Tokomaru to Rangitīkei. No boundary changes occurred in the 2020 redistribution.

The first MP for Otaki since its recreation was Judy Keall. She was succeeded in 2002 by Darren Hughes, her former executive assistant who became the youngest member of the House of Representatives. Former Horowhenua district councillor Nathan Guy won in 2008 on his second attempt and held the electorate until his retirement in 2020. The electorate was held by both Labour and National MPs in its final two terms.

The 2025 boundary review required a reduction in North Island electorates by one to reflect nationwide population shifts. The three Wellington City electorates (Rongotai, Wellington Central and Ōhāriu) were all underpopulated. All were abolished with flow-on effects for the wider region. The Mana and Ōtaki electorates were also abolished, with the population of Ōtaki being redistributed to Kapiti and Rangitīkei.

=== Members of Parliament ===
Unless otherwise stated, all MPs' terms began and ended at general elections.

Key

Independent Liberal Reform Labour Labour National

Election	Winner
1893 election	James Wilson
1896 election	Henry Augustus Field
1899 election	Henry Augustus Field
1900 by-election	William Hughes Field
1902 election	William Hughes Field
1905 election	William Hughes Field
1908 election	William Hughes Field
1911 election	John Robertson
1914 election	William Hughes Field
1919 election	William Hughes Field
1922 election	William Hughes Field
1925 election	William Hughes Field
1928 election	William Hughes Field
1931 election	William Hughes Field
1935 election	Leonard Lowry
1938 election	Leonard Lowry
1943 election	Leonard Lowry
1946 election	Jimmy Maher
1949 election	Jimmy Maher
1951 election	Jimmy Maher
1954 election	Jimmy Maher
1957 election	Jimmy Maher
1960 election	Allan McCready
1963 election	Allan McCready
1966 election	Allan McCready
1969 election	Allan McCready
(electorate abolished 1972–1996, see Kapiti and Manawatu)
1996 election	Judy Keall
1999 election	Judy Keall
2002 election	Darren Hughes
2005 election	Darren Hughes
2008 election	Nathan Guy
2011 election	Nathan Guy
2014 election	Nathan Guy
2017 election	Nathan Guy
2020 election	Terisa Ngobi
2023 election	Tim Costley
(Electorate abolished in 2026; see Kapiti)

=== List MPs ===
Members of Parliament elected from party lists in elections where that person also unsuccessfully contested the electorate. Unless otherwise stated, all MPs' terms began and ended at general elections.

Election	Winner
1996 election	Roger Sowry
1999 election	Roger Sowry
2002 election	Roger Sowry
2005 election	Nathan Guy
2008 election	Darren Hughes (Note: Hughes resigned from Parliament on 1 April 2011.)

== Election results ==
=== 2023 election ===
2023 general election: Otaki
Notes:	Blue background denotes the winner of the electorate vote. Pink background denotes a candidate elected from their party list. Yellow background denotes an electorate win by a list member, or other incumbent. A ✓ or ✗ denotes status of any incumbent, win or lose respectively.						
Party	Candidate	Votes	%	±%	Party votes	%	±%
National	Tim Costley	22,145	50.23	+8.96	16,520	37.08	+10.65
Labour	✗ Terisa Ngobi	15,874	36.01	−11.80	13,709	30.77	−19.54
Green	Ali Muhammad	2,946	6.68	+2.01	4,703	10.56	+4.15
ACT	Sean Rush	1,327	3.01	+1.00	3,306	7.42	+0.28
NZ Loyal	Bryan Ten-Have	1,078	2.45	—	637	1.43	—
Not A Party	Bob Wessex	75	0.17	—			
NZ First					3,437	7.72	+5.07
Opportunities					692	1.55	+0.49
Te Pāti Māori					510	1.14	+0.83
NewZeal					210	0.47	+0.16 (Note: Compared to ONE Party)
Legalise Cannabis					158	0.35	+0.04
Freedoms NZ					137	0.31	—
Animal Justice					89	0.20	—
New Conservative					52	0.12	−1.26
DemocracyNZ					48	0.11	—
Women's Rights					34	0.08	—
New Nation					20	0.04	—
Leighton Baker Party					17	0.04	—
Informal votes		640			270		
Total valid votes		44,085			44,549		
National gain from Labour	Majority	6,271	14.22	+7.79			

=== 2020 election ===
2020 general election: Ōtaki
Notes:	Blue background denotes the winner of the electorate vote. Pink background denotes a candidate elected from their party list. Yellow background denotes an electorate win by a list member, or other incumbent. A ✓ or ✗ denotes status of any incumbent, win or lose respectively.						
Party	Candidate	Votes	%	±%	Party votes	%	±%
Labour	Terisa Ngobi	21,867	47.81	+12.44	24,023	52.22	+17.28
National	Tim Costley	18,879	41.27	−9.04	12,159	26.43	−19.59
Green	Bernard Long	2,135	4.67	−0.59	2,947	6.41	+0.76
ACT	Wayne Desmond Grattan	918	2.01	+1.76	3,284	7.14	+6.75
New Conservative	Martin Frauenstein	496	1.08	—	633	1.38	+1.22
Attica	Michael Kay	241	0.53	—			
Social Credit	Amanda Vickers	192	0.42	—	60	0.13	+0.12
ONE	Pisa Seala	163	0.36	—	144	0.31	—
NZ First					1,218	2.65	−5.55
Opportunities					485	1.06	−1.13
Advance NZ					372	0.81	—
Māori Party					141	0.31	−0.06
Legalise Cannabis					141	0.31	+0.13
Outdoors					41	0.09	+0.05
Vision NZ					30	0.07	—
Sustainable NZ					21	0.05	—
TEA					6	0.01	—
Heartland					2	0.00	—
Informal votes		850			300		
Total valid votes		45,741			46,007		
Turnout		46,007					
Labour gain from National	Majority	2,988	6.43	—			

=== 2017 election ===
2017 general election: Ōtaki
Notes:	Blue background denotes the winner of the electorate vote. Pink background denotes a candidate elected from their party list. Yellow background denotes an electorate win by a list member, or other incumbent. A ✓ or ✗ denotes status of any incumbent, win or lose respectively.						
Party	Candidate	Votes	%	±%	Party votes	%	±%
National	✓ Nathan Guy	20,725	50.31	−4.49	19,187	46.02	−2.69
Labour	Rob McCann	14,569	35.37	+0.90	15,014	34.94	+10.29
Green	Sam Ferguson	2,167	5.26	−1.17	2,358	5.65	−3.74
NZ First	Romuald Edward Rudzki	1,680	4.07	—	3,421	8.20	−1.69
Opportunities	Piri-Hira Tukapua	1,051	2.55	—	910	2.18	—
Independent	Sam Jennings	504	1.22	—			
ACT	Wayne Desmond Grattan	105	0.25	—	163	0.39	+0.10
Māori Party					156	0.37	−0.07
Legalise Cannabis					79	0.18	−0.18
Conservative					69	0.16	−4.22
Ban 1080					44	0.10	−0.06
United Future					25	0.05	—
People's Party					24	0.05	—
Outdoors					19	0.04	—
Mana					9	0.02	−0.62 (Note: 2017 Mana Party swing is relative to the votes for Internet-Mana in 2014; it shared a party list with the Internet Party in the 2014 election)
Democrats					7	0.01	−0.04
Internet					3	0.007	−0.633 (Note: 2017 Internet Party swing is relative to the votes for Internet-Mana in 2014; it shared a party list with Mana Party in the 2014 election)
Informal votes		386			198		
Total valid votes		41,187			41,686		
National hold	Majority	6,156	14.95	−5.38			

=== 2014 election ===
2014 general election: Ōtaki
Notes:	Blue background denotes the winner of the electorate vote. Pink background denotes a candidate elected from their party list. Yellow background denotes an electorate win by a list member, or other incumbent. A ✓ or ✗ denotes status of any incumbent, win or lose respectively.						
Party	Candidate	Votes	%	±%	Party votes	%	±%
National	✓ Nathan Guy	20,980	54.80	+3.23	18,854	48.71	+1.92
Labour	Rob McCann	13,198	34.47	−3.01	9,543	24.65	−4.94
Green	Maddy Drew	2,462	6.43	+1.72	3,635	9.39	+0.21
Conservative	Anne Lovelock	913	2.38	+0.65	1,695	4.38	+1.19
Independent	Amanda Vickers	203	0.53	+0.53			
Independent	Frederick Macdonald	118	0.31	+0.31			
NZ First					3,827	9.89	+1.77
Internet Mana					249	0.64	+0.43 (Note: 2014 Internet Mana swing is relative to the votes for Mana in 2011; it shared a party list with Internet in the 2014 election.)
Māori Party					169	0.44	−0.12
Legalise Cannabis					138	0.36	−0.07
ACT					111	0.29	−0.38
United Future					74	0.19	−0.52
Ban 1080					61	0.16	+0.16
Democrats					19	0.05	+0.01
Independent Coalition					19	0.05	+0.05
Civilian					12	0.03	+0.03
Focus					6	0.02	+0.02
Informal votes		412			298		
Total valid votes		38,286			38,710		
Turnout		38,710	82.49	+3.23			
National hold	Majority	7,782	20.33	+6.24			

=== 2011 election ===
2011 general election: Ōtaki
Notes:	Blue background denotes the winner of the electorate vote. Pink background denotes a candidate elected from their party list. Yellow background denotes an electorate win by a list member, or other incumbent. A ✓ or ✗ denotes status of any incumbent, win or lose respectively.						
Party	Candidate	Votes	%	±%	Party votes	%	±%
National	✓ Nathan Guy	19,151	51.57	+2.90	17,609	46.79	+2.02
Labour	Peter Foster	13,920	37.48	−7.70	11,137	29.59	−7.36
Green	Michael Gilchrist	1,750	4.71	+2.06	3,612	9.60	+3.96
NZ First	David Scott	1,122	3.02	+1.02	3,057	8.12	+2.63
Conservative	John Stephen Ryersson	644	1.73	+1.73	1,202	3.19	+3.19
Legalise Cannabis	Fred MacDonald	253	0.68	+0.68	162	0.43	+0.14
ACT	Peter McCaffrey	115	0.31	−0.23	253	0.67	−1.92
United Future	Diane Brown	110	0.30	−0.09	266	0.71	−0.31
Independent	Philip Dean Taueki	73	0.20	+0.20			
Māori Party					210	0.56	−0.26
Mana					80	0.21	+0.21
Libertarianz					19	0.05	+0.02
Democrats					15	0.04	+0.01
Alliance					11	0.03	−0.04
Informal votes		573			292		
Total valid votes		37,138			37,633		
National hold	Majority	5,231	14.09	+10.60			

Electorate (as at 26 November 2011): 47,483

=== 2008 election ===
2008 general election: Ōtaki
Notes:	Blue background denotes the winner of the electorate vote. Pink background denotes a candidate elected from their party list. Yellow background denotes an electorate win by a list member, or other incumbent. A ✓ or ✗ denotes status of any incumbent, win or lose respectively.						
Party	Candidate	Votes	%	±%	Party votes	%	±%
National	Nathan Guy	18,885	48.67	+3.91	17,534	44.77	+3.10
Labour	✗ Darren Hughes	17,531	45.18	−0.58	14,472	36.95	+4.72
Green	Jim Kebbell	1,029	2.65		2,207	5.64	1.09
NZ First	David John Scott	778	2.01		2,153	5.50	−1.29
Progressive	Josie Pagani	221	0.57		453	1.16	−0.43
ACT	Peter McCaffrey	210	0.54		1,014	2.59	+1.60
United Future	Diane Brown	148	0.38	−1.25	397	1.01	−2.34
Māori Party					321	0.82	+0.08
Bill and Ben					177	0.45	
Kiwi					165	0.42	
Legalise Cannabis					115	0.29	+0.06
Family Party					84	0.21	
Alliance					28	0.07	−0.13
Libertarianz					12	0.03	+0.01
Democrats					10	0.03	−0.02
Pacific					9	0.02	
Workers Party					6	0.02	
RONZ					5	0.01	±0.00
RAM					0	0.00	
Informal votes		186			111		
Total valid votes		38,802			39,162		
National gain from Labour	Majority	1,354	3.49				

=== 2005 election ===
2005 general election: Otaki
Notes:	Blue background denotes the winner of the electorate vote. Pink background denotes a candidate elected from their party list. Yellow background denotes an electorate win by a list member, or other incumbent. A ✓ or ✗ denotes status of any incumbent, win or lose respectively.						
Party	Candidate	Votes	%	±%	Party votes	%	±%
Labour	✓ Darren Hughes	17,556	45.76	−7.27	16,131	41.67	
National	Nathan Guy	17,174	44.76	+13.79	15,174	39.20	
NZ First	Chris Perry	1,043	2.72		2,630	6.79	
Green	Nick Fisher	1,022	2.66		1,761	4.55	
United Future	Diane Brown	611	1.59		1,297	3.35	
Māori Party	Richard Orzecki	353	0.92		286	0.74	
Progressive	Russell Franklin	303	0.79		614	1.59	
ACT	Simon Ewing-Jarvie	163	0.42		383	0.99	
Alliance	Margaret Jeune	97	0.25		78	0.20	
Direct Democracy	Robert Atack	47	0.12		7	0.02	
Destiny					154	0.40	
Legalise Cannabis					88	0.23	
Family Rights					54	0.14	
Christian Heritage					37	0.10	
Democrats					21	0.05	
99 MP					14	0.04	
One NZ					14	0.04	
Libertarianz					9	0.02	
RONZ					5	0.01	
Informal votes		242			134		
Total valid votes		38,369			38,707		
Labour hold	Majority	382	1.00	−21.07			

=== 1999 election ===
Refer to Candidates in the New Zealand general election 1999 by electorate#Otaki for a list of candidates.

=== 1943 election ===
1943 general election: Otaki
Party	Candidate	Votes	%	±%
Labour	Leonard Lowry	5,151	46.56	−9.76
National	Bert Cooksley	4,960	44.83	
Democratic Labour	Robert James Barnett	454	4.10	
People's Movement	William Jonathan Crawford	413	3.73	
Informal votes		84	0.75	+0.41
Majority		191	1.72	−11.27
Turnout		11,062	92.16	−1.97
Registered electors		12,003		

=== 1938 election ===
1938 general election: Otaki
Party	Candidate	Votes	%	±%
Labour	Leonard Lowry	5,926	56.32	+6.35
National	Alex Monk	4,559	43.33	+12.41
Informal votes		36	0.34	
Majority		1,367	12.99	−6.06
Turnout		10,521	94.13	+10.87
Registered electors		11,177		

=== 1935 election ===
1935 general election: Otaki
Party	Candidate	Votes	%	±%
Labour	Leonard Lowry	4,511	49.97	
Reform	Alex Monk	2,791	30.92	
Independent	Will Appleton	975	10.80	
Democrat	Robert Westley Bothamley	750	8.31	
Majority		1,720	19.05	+3.28
Turnout		9,027	83.26	−0.73
Registered electors		10,842		

=== 1931 election ===
1931 general election: Otaki
Party	Candidate	Votes	%	±%
Reform	William Hughes Field	4,848	57.89	
Labour	Jim Thorn	3,527	42.11	
Majority		1,321	15.77	
Informal votes		92	1.09	
Turnout		8,467	83.99	
Registered electors		10,081		

=== 1928 election ===
1928 general election: Otaki
Party	Candidate	Votes	%	±%
Reform	William Hughes Field	3,407	44.54	
United	Archie Sievwright	2,594	33.91	
Labour	Harold Dyson	1,400	18.30	
Independent	James Purchase	249	3.25	
Majority		813	10.63	
Informal votes		106	1.37	
Turnout		7,756	88.29	
Registered electors		8,785		

=== 1900 by-election ===
1900 Otaki by-election
Party	Candidate	Votes	%	±%
Liberal	William Hughes Field	1,755	52.44	
Conservative	Charles Morison	1,592	47.56	+2.09
Majority		163	4.87	−4.18
Turnout		3,347	62.35	−0.45
Registered electors		5,368		

== Sources ==
- McRobie, Alan (1989). Electoral Atlas of New Zealand. Wellington: GP Books. ISBN 0-477-01384-8.
- Wilson, Jim (1985) [First published in 1913]. New Zealand Parliamentary Record, 1840–1984 (4th ed.). Wellington: V.R. Ward, Govt. Printer. OCLC 154283103.
