= James Nairn =

Scottish-born New Zealand painter (1859–1904)

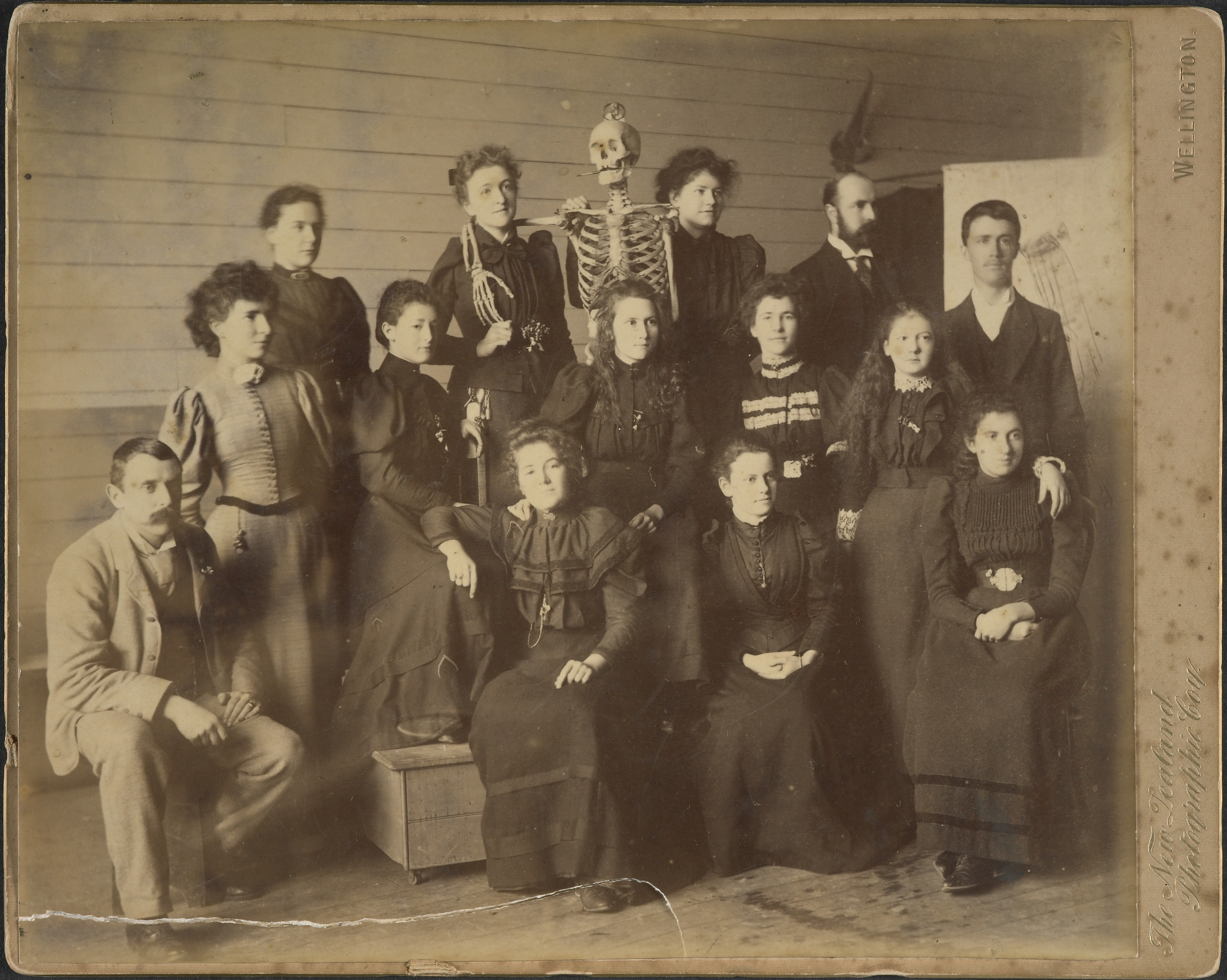
Group portrait of students at the Wellington School of Design. James Nairn and Mabel Hill at far left. Woman posing with skeleton's arm around her shoulder is Mary Elizabeth Tripe.

James McLauchlan Nairn (18 November 1859 – 22 February 1904) was a New Zealand painter who (along with G. P. Nerli) strongly influenced New Zealand painting in the late 19th century. He believed in en plein air or painting outdoors.

== Life and work ==
Nairn studied at the Glasgow School of Art for four years from 1879 before enrolling as a student at the Académie Julian in Paris. During the 1880s Nairn exhibited work at the Glasgow Institute of Fine Arts and the Royal Scottish Academy and was associated with the Glasgow Boys - a group of Scottish artist interested in Impressionism.

Nairn emigrated from Glasgow to Dunedin for his health in 1890. He moved to Wellington in 1891, where he was appointed as an art instructor at the Wellington Technical School. He lectured on art and conducted classes for the study of the nude figure. He introduced Impressionism of the Glasgow school to New Zealand and influenced other New Zealand artists such as Dorothy Kate Richmond, Maud Winifred Sherwood, Mabel Hill, Maude Burge and Mollie Tripe.

Nairn's Impressionist style is conveyed in his many paintings of Wellington harbour, especially in "Wellington Harbour, 1894" where his visible brushstrokes capture the effect of the afternoon sun on the water. He painted this landscape en plein air to more truthfully capture the effect of light on water.

Nairn joined the New Zealand Academy of Fine Arts soon after settling in Wellington and was elected to the council from 1890 to 1903. He also formed the Wellington Art Club which met regularly at Nair's Pumpkin Cottage. The cottage became a gathering point for Wellington artists. Nairn's influence was felt throughout New Zealand as he regularly sent works for exhibition in other centres.

He married Ellen Smith on 17 March 1898 and they had two daughters, Mari Bhan and Ellen May Victoria.

He died at his home in Wellington on 22 February 1904, probably of peritonitis. He was 44.

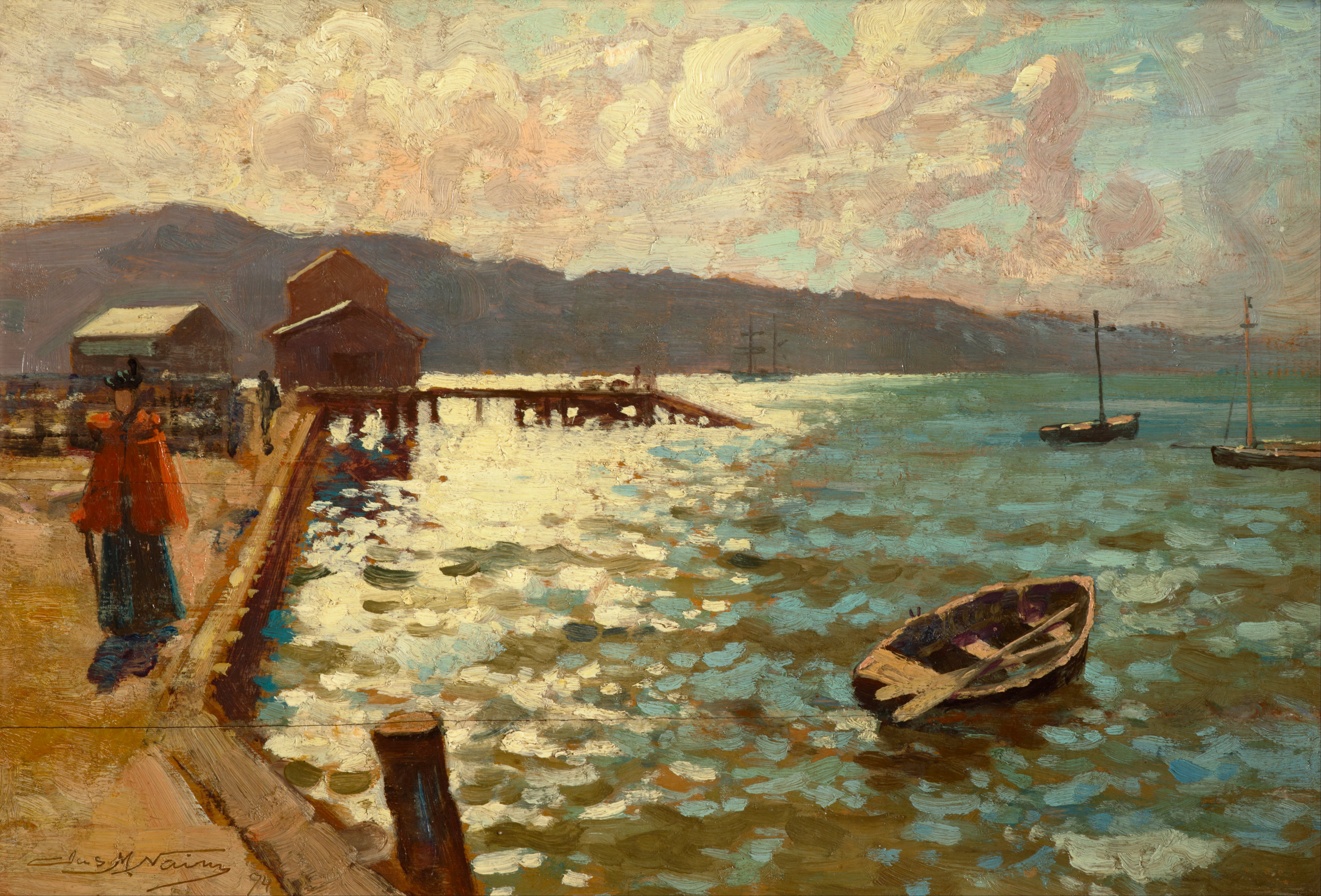
Wellington Harbour, 1894, Wellington, by James Nairn. Gift of Miss Mary Newton, 1939. Te Papa (1939-0009-2)

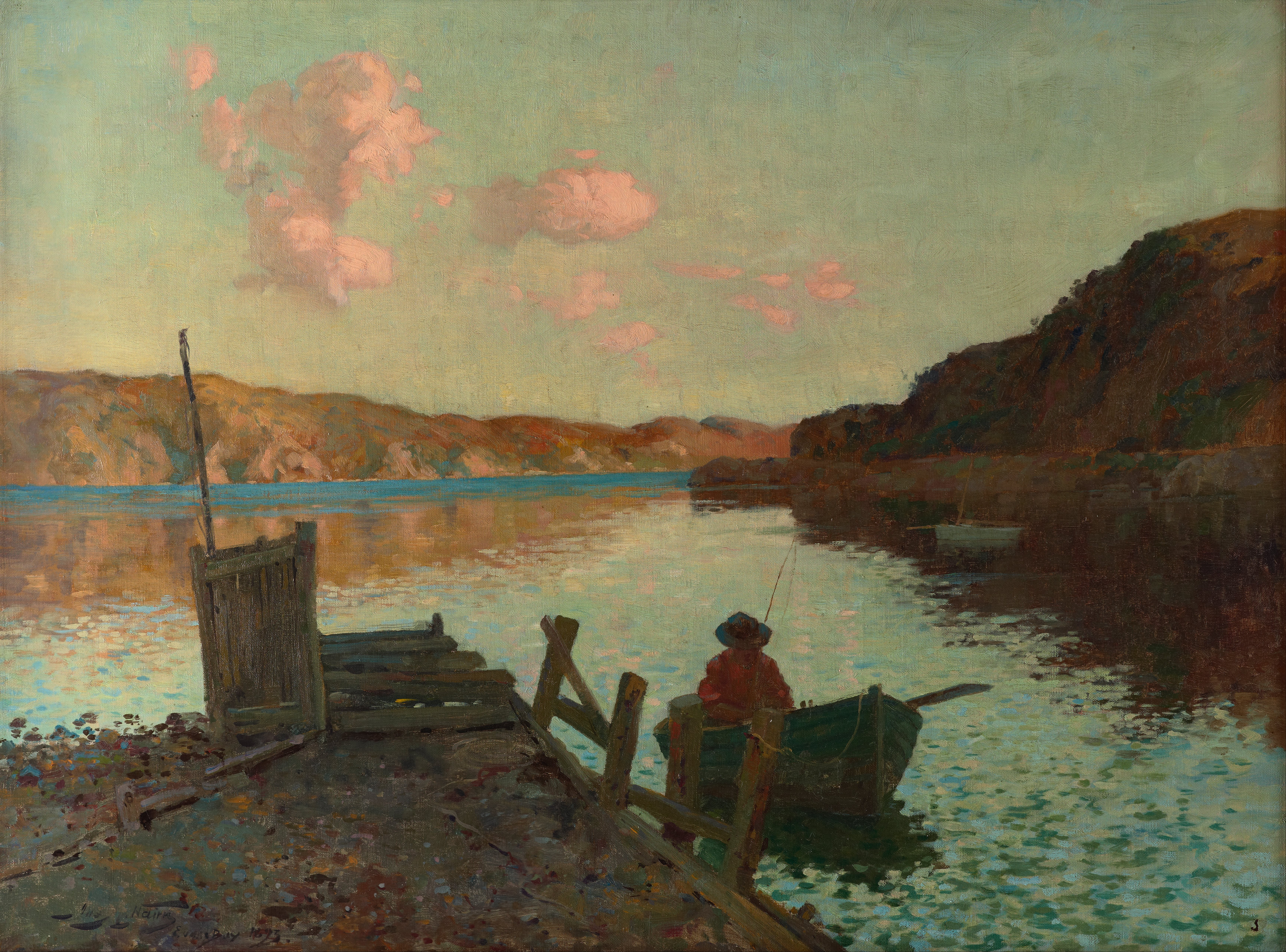
Evans Bay, 1893, Wellington, by James Nairn. Bequest from the estate of Miss S Leatham, 1939. Te Papa (1939-0009-6)

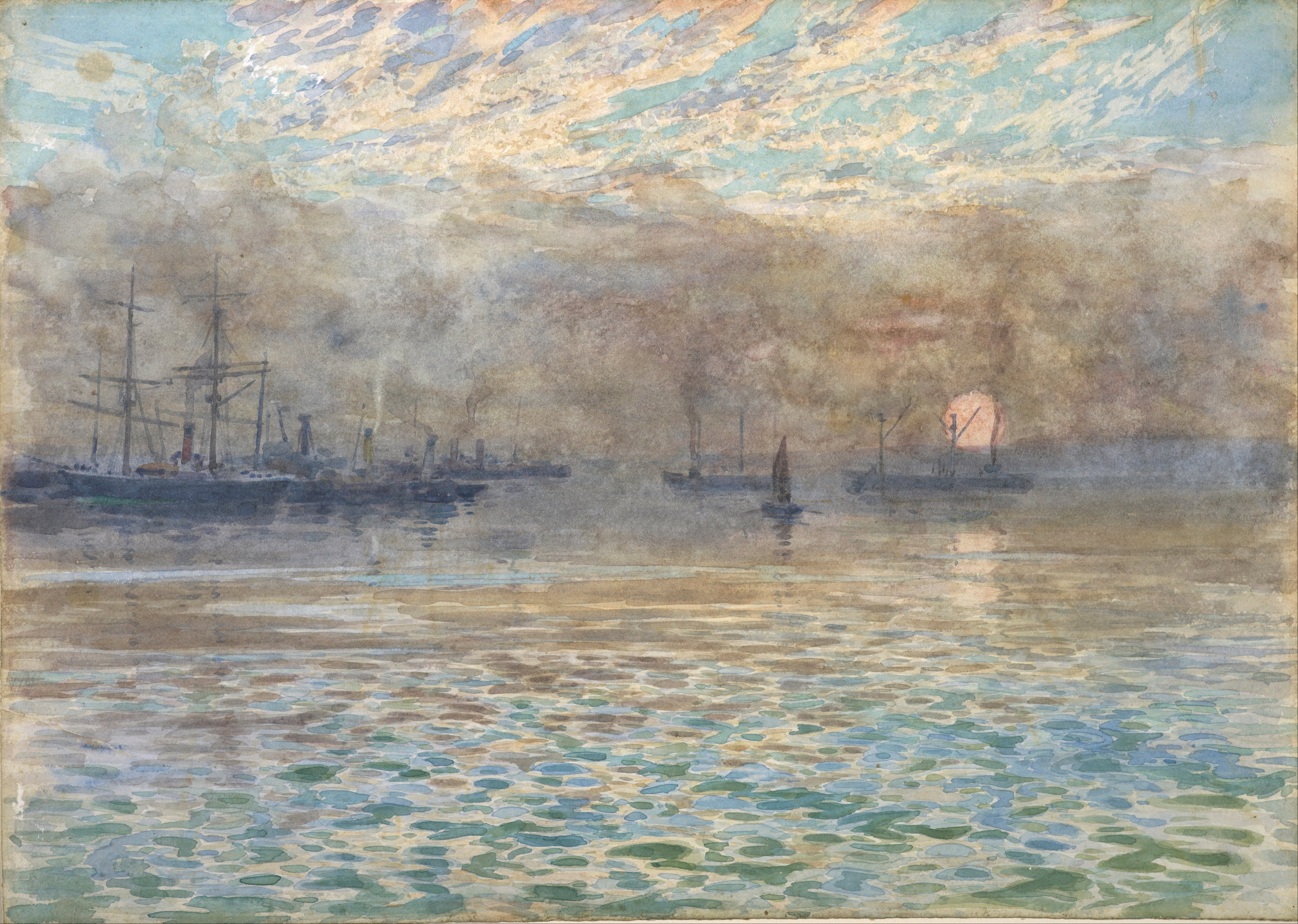
Winter morning, Wellington Harbour, circa 1900, Wellington, by James Nairn. Gift of Miss Mary Newton, 1939. Te Papa (1939-0009-7)

== Sources ==
- Biography in the 1966 Encyclopaedia of New Zealand
- Vial, Jane. "Nairn, James McLauchlan 1859–1904". Dictionary of New Zealand Biography. Ministry for Culture and Heritage.
- Notes by Una Platts
- The Wellington Art Club by Una Platts
- Museum of New Zealand Te Papa Tongarewa James Nairn biography
