= John McIndoe =

John McIndoe may refer to:

- John McIndoe (minister) (1934–2022), minister of the Church of Scotland
- John McIndoe (printer) (1858–1916), New Zealand printer
- John McIndoe (artist) (1898–1995), New Zealand artist and printer
- John McIndoe (musician), British singer, guitarist and actor
