= Maud Winifred Sherwood =

New Zealand artist (1880–1956)

- Maud Winifred Sherwood, 1912
- Born: Maud Winifred Kimbell; 22 December 1880; Dunedin, New Zealand.
- Died: 1 December 1956 (aged 75); Katoomba, New South Wales.
- Education: Wellington Technical College
- Known for: Painting
- Spouse: Alfred Charles Sherwood (m. 1917–1922)

Maud Winifred Kimbell Sherwood (1880–1956) was a notable New Zealand artist, exhibiting at the New Zealand Academy of Fine Arts, the Royal Academy of Arts, London and the Paris Salon.

== Biography ==
Kimbell was born in Dunedin, Otago, New Zealand in 1880. In the 1890s her family moved to Wellington.

She studied art at the Wellington Technical College and was taught by James Nairn, Mary Tripe and Mabel Hill. When Nairn died in 1904, Sherwood took over his sketching and still-life classes and she continued to teach at Wellington Technical College until 1911.

After leaving the college, Kimbell traveled and studied in Europe until 1913. Upon leaving Europe she settled in Australia

In 1917 she married Alfred Charles Sherwood whom she divorced in 1922. In 1925 she returned to New Zealand, traveling back to Europe in 1926 where she stayed and exhibited for seven years, including and exhibition at the Royal Academy of Arts.

Sherwood returned to Australia in 1933 where she was awarded the Coronation Medal in 1937 and an Australian 150th Anniversary Exhibition Medal in 1938. She was a member of the Society of Artists..., Sydney.

She died on 1 December 1956 in Katoomba, Australia

Public collections in both New Zealand and Australia hold her paintings.

== Gallery ==
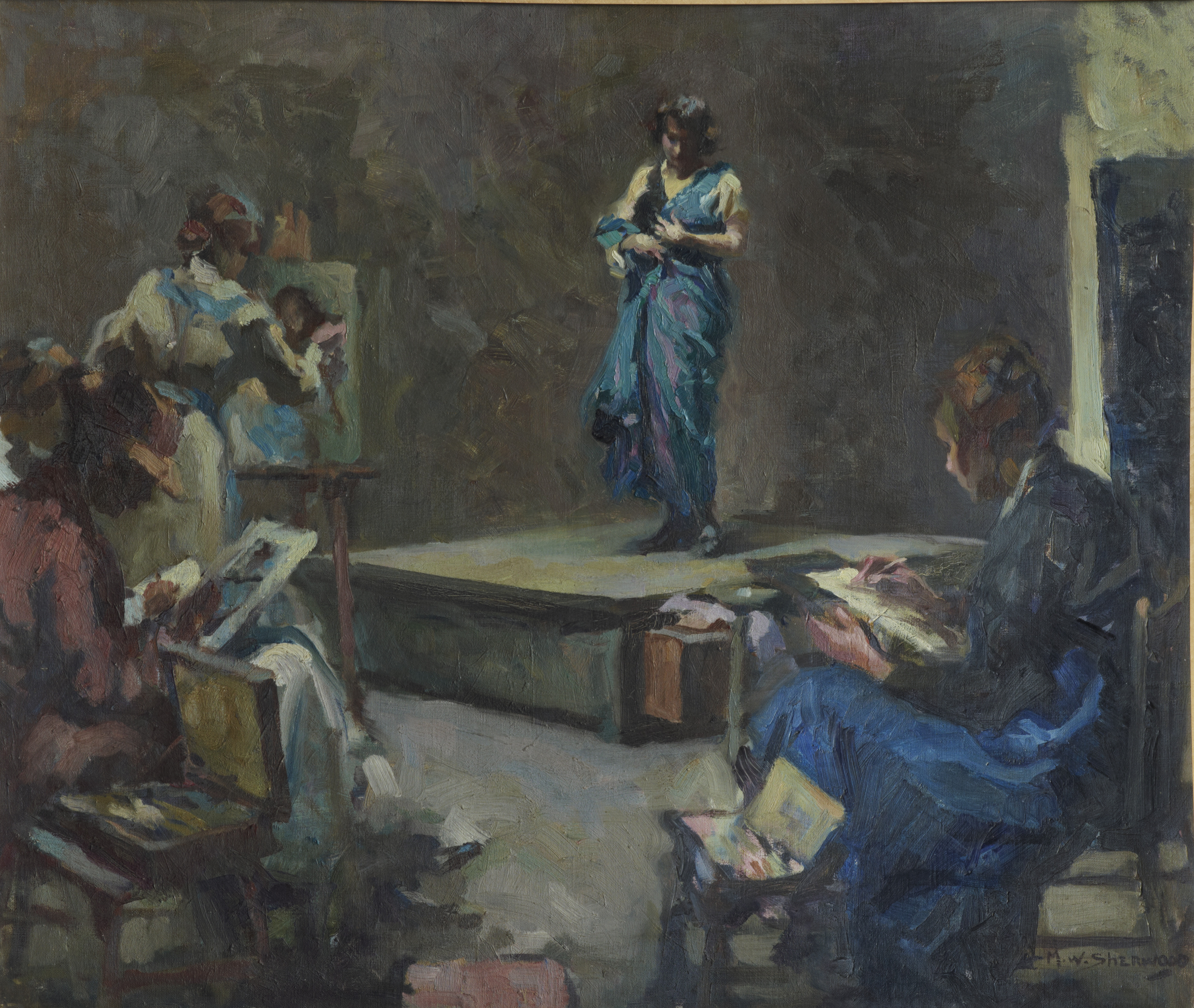
