= Mollie Tripe =

New Zealand painter and art teacher (1870–1939)

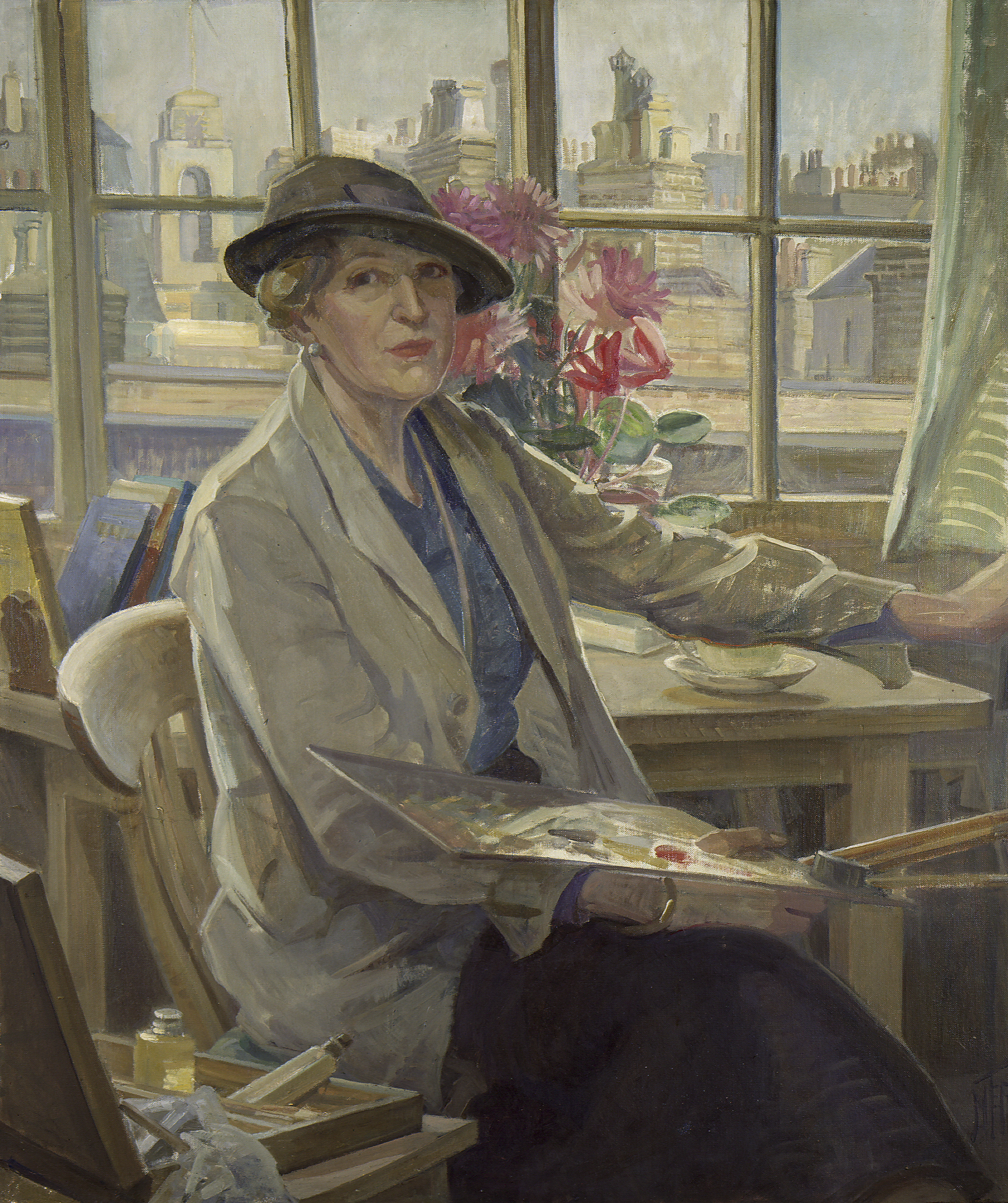
- Self portrait, c.1937
- Born: Mary Elizabeth Richardson; 14 September 1870; Christchurch, New Zealand
- Died: 21 September 1939 (aged 69); Wellington, New Zealand
- Education: Canterbury School of Art; Wellington School of Design
- Known for: Portraits of notable New Zealanders
- Spouse: Joseph Albert Tripe (m. 1900; died 1926)

Mary Elizabeth Tripe (née Richardson, 14 September 1870 – 21 September 1939), generally known as Mollie Tripe, was a New Zealand artist and art teacher.

== Education and family ==
Tripe was born Mary Elizabeth Richardson in Christchurch, New Zealand, the daughter of Edward Richardson, a Member of Parliament for Kaiapoi, and his second wife, Frances Mary Elizabeth (Corke) Richardson. She attended Christchurch Girls' High School.

In 1900 she married Joseph Albert Tripe, a solicitor, and they had three children.

== Art career ==
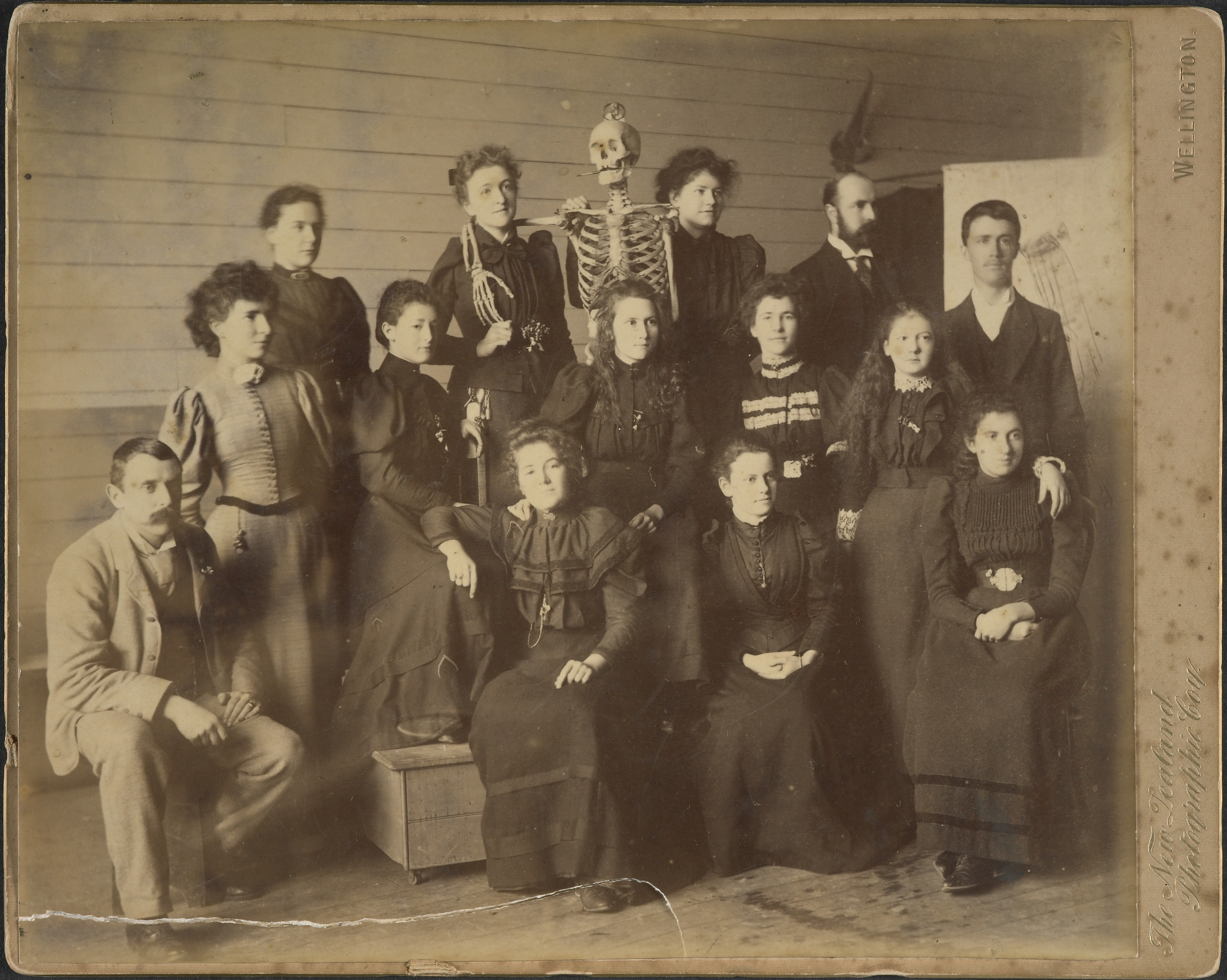
Group portrait of students at the Wellington School of Design. Mary Elizabeth Tripe has the skeleton's arm around her shoulder. James Nairn and Mabel Hill are at far left.

Tripe studied at the Canterbury School of Art and the new Wellington School of Design (WSD), then under the direction of its founder, Arthur Dewhurst Riley. She graduated from the WSD in 1890 with a teaching certificate and went on to get a master's certificate in 1894. She started teaching drawing at the WSD in 1889; among her colleagues were James Nairn and Mabel Hill. She left the school following her marriage but continued to give private lessons. She taught oil painting to artist and print maker Hinehauone Coralie Cook.

From the 1880s onwards, Tripe exhibited in New Zealand, in London, at the Paris Salon, and elsewhere. She started out as an Impressionist painter but over time moved towards a more realistic style founded in strong draughtsmanship. She became known especially for her portraits of leading New Zealand citizens, including Sir Robert Stout, Sir Frederic Truby King, Sir Michael Myers, William Edward Sanders, and the painter Dolla Richmond.

In 1893, she became the first woman appointed to the council of the New Zealand Academy of Fine Arts, and she also influenced the founding of the National Art Gallery of New Zealand and its portrait collection.

She was awarded the Coronation Medal in 1937, and died at her home in Wellington on 21 September 1939. Her ashes were buried in Karori Cemetery.
