= Alfred Henry O'Keeffe =

New Zealand artist and teacher

Alfred Henry O'Keeffe (21 July 1858 - 27 July 1941), was a New Zealand artist and art teacher, who spent the majority of his life in Dunedin. During the first quarter of the twentieth century, he was one of the few New Zealand artists to engage with new ideas while staying in New Zealand. At this time most adventurous New Zealand painters, such as Frances Hodgkins, went overseas. He has sometimes been described as a Vasari - a recorder of artists and their doings - based upon his published recollections, which are the only first hand published account of that milieu.

O'Keeffe was born in Sandhurst, Victoria, Australia in 1858. By c.1865 he and his family had moved to Dunedin. O'Keeffe studied at the Dunedin School of Art c.1881-86 and later at the Académie Julian in Paris in 1894–1895. He started exhibiting at the Otago Art Society in 1886 and also exhibited with the Canterbury Society of Arts, the New Zealand Academy of Fine Arts, the Auckland Society of Arts, South Canterbury Arts Society and the Wanganui Society of Arts and Crafts. During these formative years he was a keen member of boating and cycling organisations.

The demands of providing for his wife and six children meant O'Keeffe could not always afford to work as a full-time artist. Before going to Paris he managed the Liverpool Arms Hotel in Dunedin. After his return, from 1896 to 1905, he ran the Outram Hotel.

He also supplemented his income by teaching art. While living at Outram he took private classes in Dunedin, walking the 14 miles between. He taught at the Dunedin School of Art from 1912 until its temporary closure in 1920. In the early 1920s he taught at the 'Barn Studio' with Mabel Hill. Her 1913 portrait of O'Keeffe is now in the Dunedin Public Art Gallery.

Four of O'Keeffe's six children predeceased him. His two sons Lawrence and Victor were both killed in 1915 at Gallipoli. This experience is commemorated in his best known painting The Defence Minister's Telegram (1921, Dunedin Public Art Gallery), which shows an elderly man receiving news of his son's death. One of his daughters died in 1917 and another in 1939.

O'Keeffe died at his home in Dunedin in 1941 and was interred at Andersons Bay Cemetery.

O'Keeffe's finest paintings date from the 1920s and 1930s, however, most critical attention has concentrated on works painted in the first decade of the 20th century, notably Roses and Arum Lilies of 1906, now in the Auckland Art Gallery, and The Model at Rest of the same year, in the Dunedin Public Art Gallery. His range of subject matter encompassed genre scenes, portraiture, landscapes (especially seascapes) and still life.

His work is represented in the Auckland Art Gallery; Fletcher Collection, Auckland; Museum of New Zealand Te Papa Tongarewa, Wellington; Sarjeant Gallery, Wanganui; Christchurch Art Gallery; Aigantighe Art Museum, Timaru; Dunedin Public Art Gallery; Hocken Collections, University of Otago, Dunedin; and Anderson Park Art Gallery, Invercargill.

O'Keeffe is the focus of the exhibition A. H. O'Keeffe: Light in the Shadows, at the Dunedin Public Art Gallery from 29 September until 9 December 2012, the first solo exhibition of his works since 1957.

== Scholarship on O'Keeffe ==
To date the five main resources on O'Keeffe are:

- Ralph Body, 'The Doyen of Dunedin Art: Alfred Henry O'Keeffe's Late Works', The Journal of New Zealand Art History, vol. 30, 2009, pp. 17–36.
- Ralph Body, 'Alfred Henry O'Keeffe in Retrospect: Paint and Personality', MA thesis, Dunedin, 2008.
- Collins, Roger D. J. "O'Keeffe, Alfred Henry 1858–1941". Dictionary of New Zealand Biography. Ministry for Culture and Heritage.
- Peter Entwisle, 'Alfred Henry O'Keeffe', in William Mathew Hodgkins & His Circle, Dunedin, 1984
- Barry Cleavin, 'An appreciation of A. H. O'Keeffe, painter, 1858—1941'. DipFA thesis, Canterbury, 1966

== Images by Alfred Henry O'Keeffe on the Web ==
- Auckland Art Gallery
- Museum of New Zealand Te Papa Tongarewa
- Christchurch Art Gallery
- Fletcher Collection
- New Zealand War Art
- Dunedin Public Art Gallery The Defence Minister's Telegram (1921)
- Dunedin Public Art Gallery The Model at Rest (1906)
- Portrait (1887), Alys Antiques
