= Maude Burge =

New Zealand artist (1865–1957)

- Born: Maude Mary Annie Williams; 18 May 1865; Wellington, New Zealand
- Died: 20 May 1957 (aged 92); Masterton, New Zealand
- Resting place: Masterton Cemetery
- Education: James Nairn, C.F. Goldie, Frances Hodgkins
- Known for: Painting
- Movement: Modern Art
- Spouse: George Aylesford Burge (m. 1909)

Maude Burge (née Williams; 18 May 1865 – 20 May 1957) was a New Zealand painter influenced by James Nairn. She spent time as an expatriate artist specifically in Europe. Burge was a painting companion of Frances Hodgkins who called Maude Burge a "charming changeable woman" in her published letters. They painted together at the Burge family home in St. Tropez and in Ibiza. Burge's paintings are held in the permanent collection of Auckland Art Gallery, the Museum of New Zealand Te Papa Tongarewa, the National Art Gallery of New Zealand, the Fletcher Trust Collection, the National Library of New Zealand and among private art collectors in the northern and southern hemispheres. Burge exhibited her paintings at the New Zealand Academy of Fine Arts.

== Biography ==
Maude Burge was born in Wellington, New Zealand. Her career as an artist was part of the Modern Art movement. She created paintings in oils and watercolours. Burge painted portraits of the Māori in a modernist style. While living in Europe, she painted still lifes and landscape scenes.

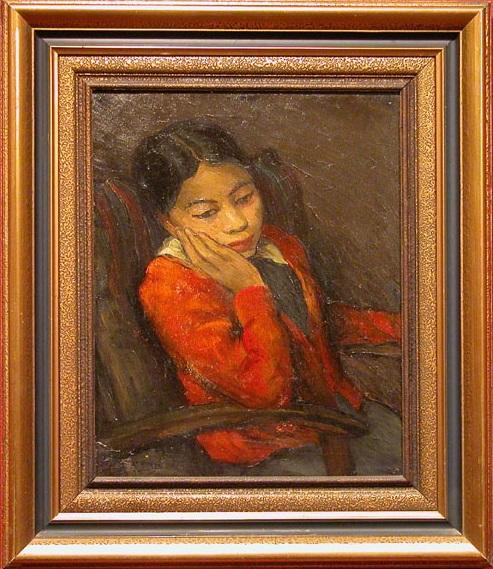
Portrait of a Maori Girl. MTG Hawke’s Bay, Public Domain. https://collection.mtghawkesbay.com/objects/5995/portrait-of-a-maori-girl

In New Zealand, Burge was a pupil of James Nairn and trained under C.F. Goldie at his studio in Auckland. Burge painted one of Goldie's favourite early models Ina Te Papatahi, of the Ngāpuhi iwi tribe. While painting in Europe, Burge was a pupil of English watercolourist Fred Mayer and was associated with British artists Frank Brangwyn and Philip Connard. Burge travelled extensively and painted watercolours of still lifes, market scenes and beach scenes in St. Tropez, Morocco and Dalmatia. Burge became a friend and painting companion of fellow New Zealand artist Frances Hodgkins. Hodgkins painted still lifes at Burge's garden in St. Tropez, 1931 and they painted together in Majorca and Ibiza. Hodgkins described Burge in her published letters as a "nervy changeable charming woman".

One of Burge's prominent paintings is an oil on canvas titled 'Portrait of Lady Fergusson'. The subject was her own sister Githa, wife of Admiral Sir James Fergusson, the brother of Sir Charles Fergusson, Governor-General of New Zealand. C.F. Goldie described Burge as being a better portrait painter of the Māori than himself. Burge's work has been sold through The International Art Centre in Parnell, Auckland and at Dunbar Sloane Art Auction house in Wellington. Burge exhibited in the New Zealand Academy of Fine Arts under her maiden name, Williams, from 1883–1906; and then from 1926, under her married name. Burge spent many years abroad until the mid-1930s when she returned to live in New Zealand.

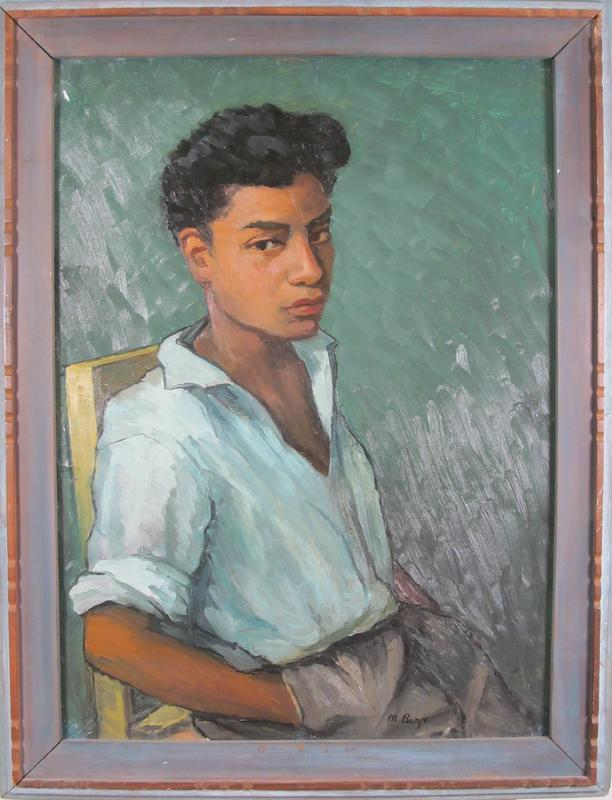
Māori Boy. MTG Hawke's Bay, Public Domain. https://collection.mtghawkesbay.com/objects/6213/maori-boy

== Personal life ==
Maude Burge was the third eldest of thirteen children born to Annie Palmer Beetham and Paihia-born landowner Thomas Coldham Williams. They lived in Hobson Street, Thorndon, Wellington. The family homestead is now owned and occupied by Queen Margaret College, Wellington. Burge's paternal grandfather was Henry Williams, who translated the Treaty of Waitangi into Māori language. Burge's maternal grandfather was William Beetham, the portrait painter. Burge's paternal grandmother was Marianne Williams, the pioneering educator in New Zealand. Burge married George Aylesford Burge in New Zealand in 1909. George was the father of James Burge, the English criminal law barrister who played a key role in court during the Profumo Affair. Maude and George travelled widely and lived and painted in locations such as St. Tropez, Cannes, Mallorca, Ibiza, Morocco and Dalmatia, before returning to New Zealand in 1937. Mr and Mrs Burge settled at Taupō and then later at Cole Street in Masterton. Maude Burge died there in 1957 at the age of ninety-two and is buried at Masterton Cemetery on Archer Street.

== Books and publications ==
- Māori Portraits – National Art Gallery, Wellington, NZ. 5–28 October 1961. Exhibition catalogue designed and printed by Fred A Davey, Eastbourne, NZ.
- Frances Hodgkins & Maude Burge Two Expatriates – Published by Hawkes Bay Art Gallery and Museum. 1988
- They Came To Wydrop – by David Yerex. 1991. Hardback. ISBN 1869560248.
- Letters of Frances Hodgkins – 1st Published by AUP New Zealand, 30 April – 29 May 1993. Edited by Linda Gill. 1993. ISBN 1 86940 081 X.
- To Market: 'Representations of the Marketplace by New Zealand Expatriate Artists 1900 -1939' – Thesis by Adrienne Maree Dempsey, 2012. Degree of Master of Arts in Art History at the University of Canterbury, Christchurch, New Zealand.

== Exhibitions ==
- Māori Portraits – National Art Gallery, Wellington, NZ. 5–28 October 1961. Portraits by Charles Frederick Goldie, H Linley Richardson, Gottfried Lindauer, Maud Burge (May Williams), Margaret Butler, Russell Clark, William A Dargie, Frances Hodgkins, Archibald F Nicoll, Robert Proctor [Procter], Horatio G Robley, Maud Sherwood (Kimbell), Sydney L Thompson,
- Frances Hodgkins & Maude Burge Two Expatriates: an exhibition of Paintings & drawings – Hawkes Bay Art Gallery, 1988.
