= Mabel Hill =

New Zealand painter

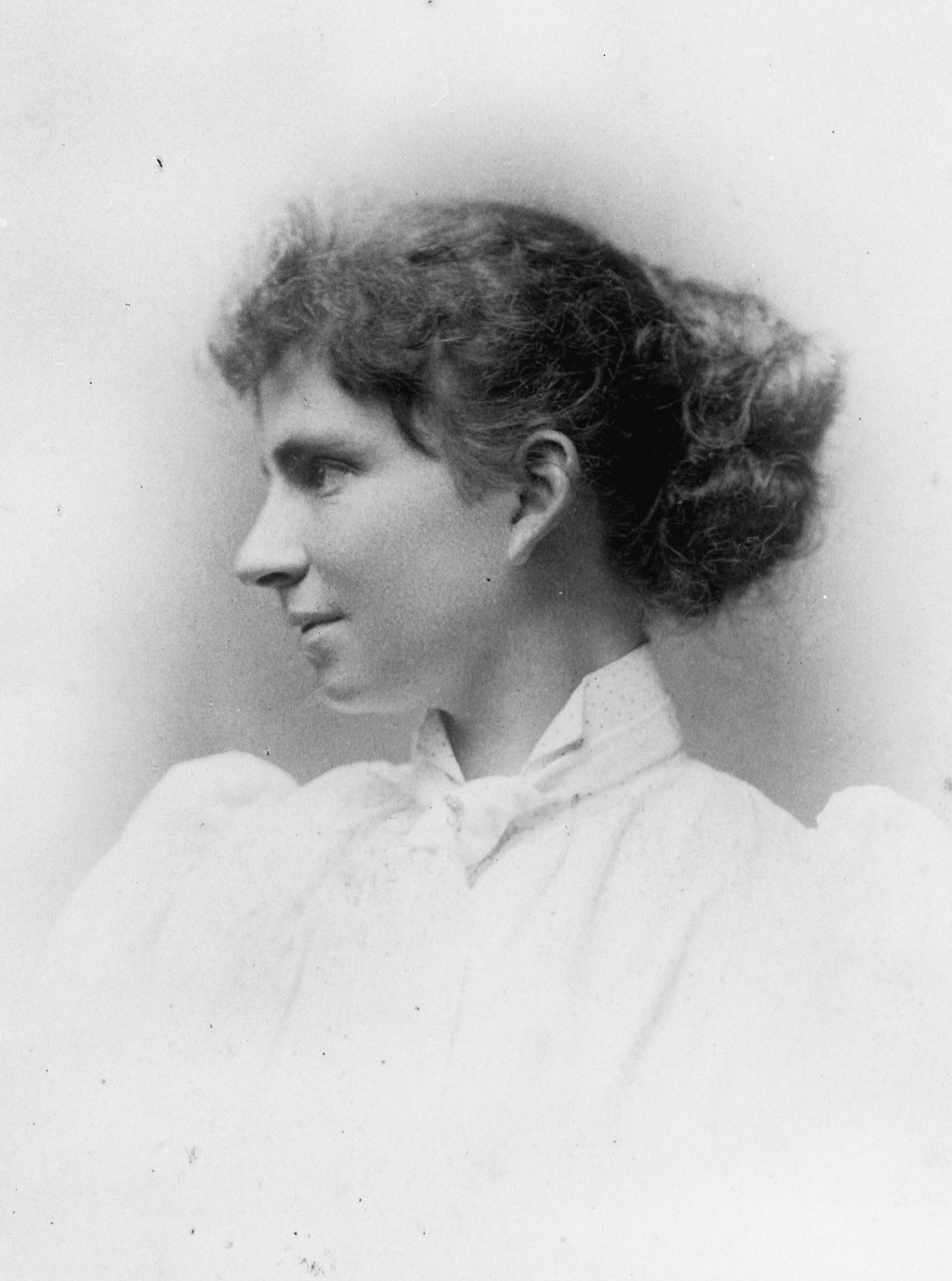
- Mabel Hill in 1898, photographed by Francis Lawrence Jones
- Born: 3 March 1872; Cox's Creek, Auckland, New Zealand
- Died: 18 November 1956 (aged 84); East Grinstead, West Sussex, England
- Education: James Nairn
- Known for: painting
- Spouse: John McIndoe

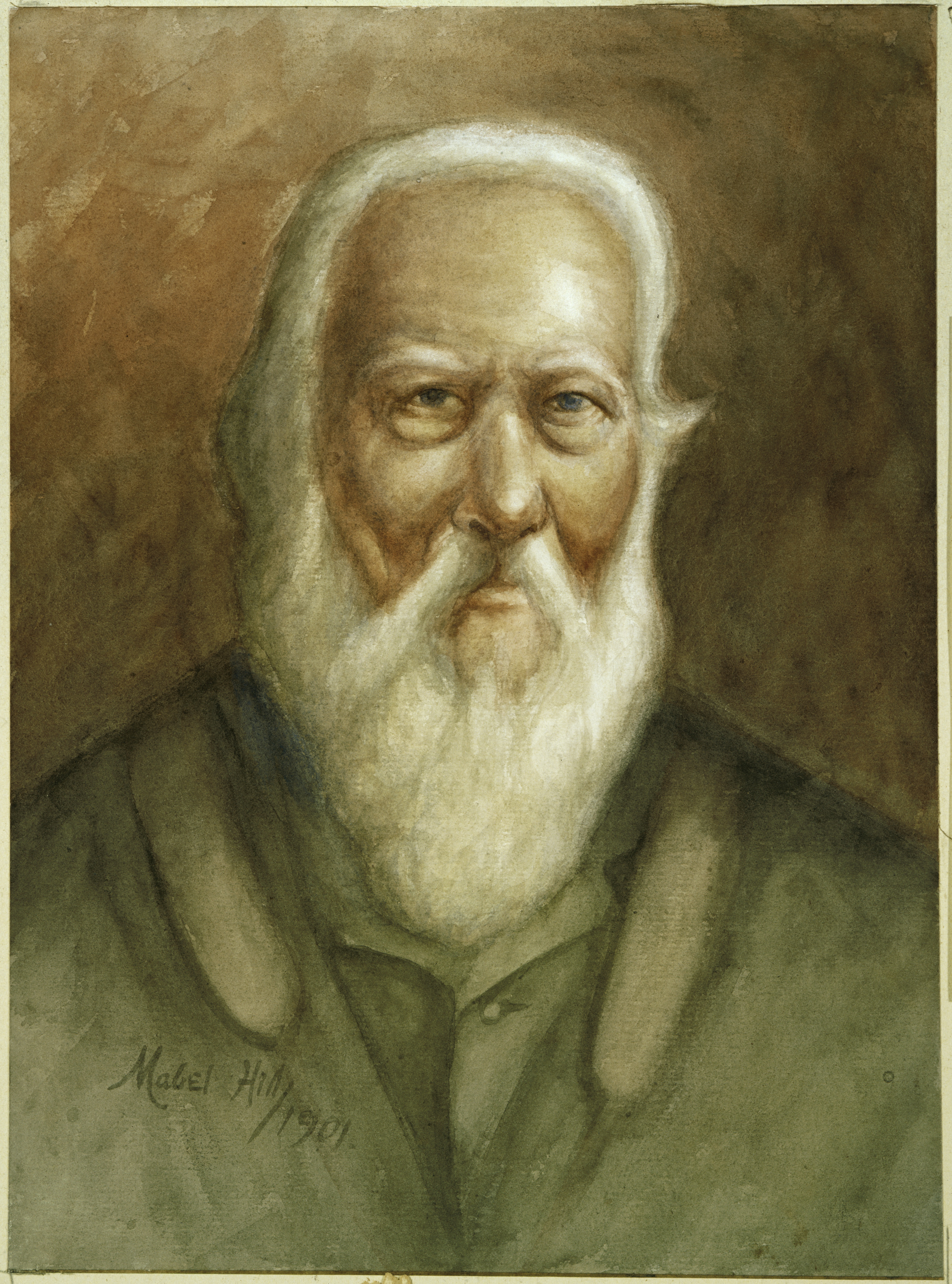
John Logan Campbell, mayor of Auckland, painted by Mabel Hill in 1901.

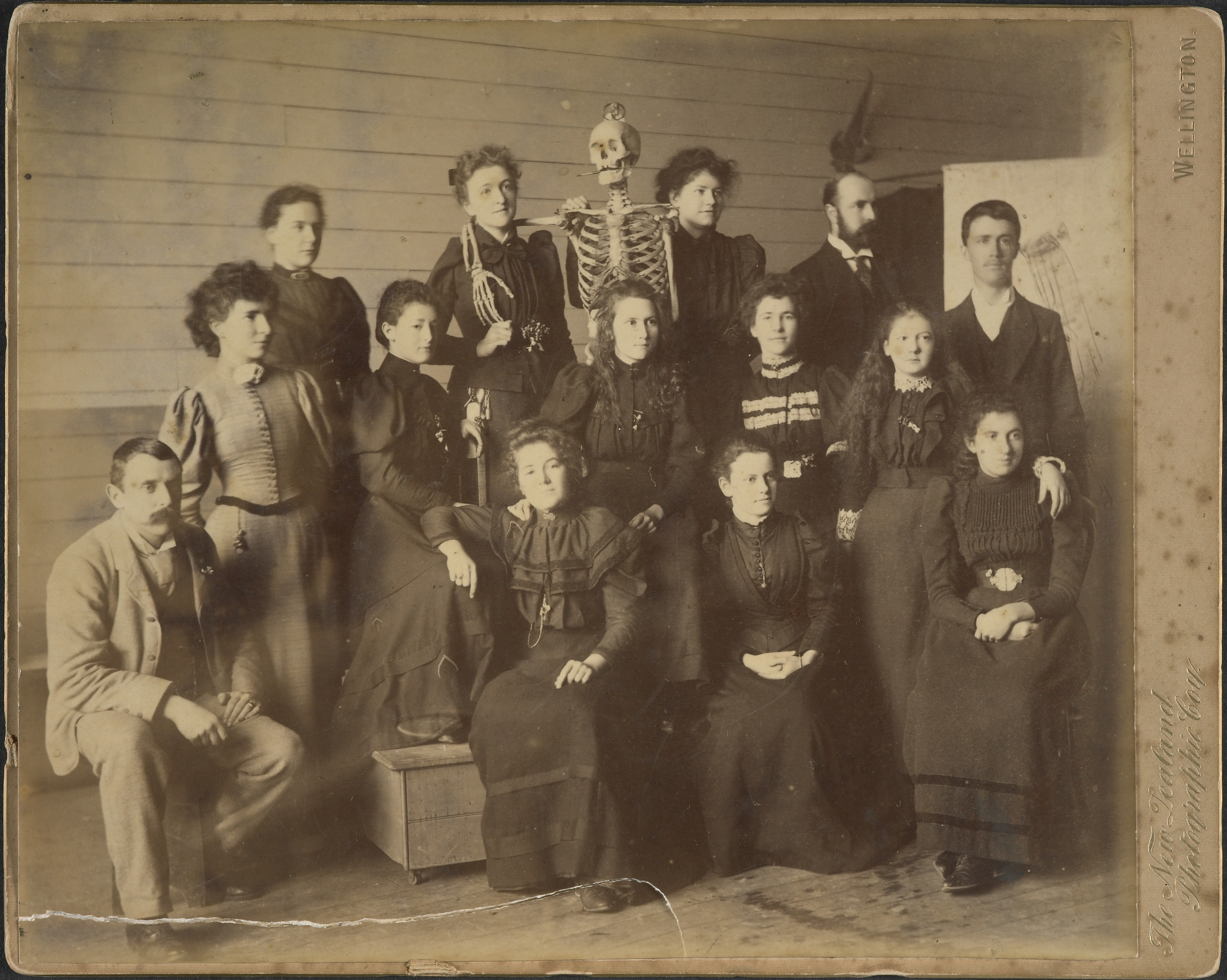
Group portrait of students at the Wellington School of Design. Mabel Hill is at far left with James Nairn; Mollie Tripe has the skeleton's arm around her shoulder.

Mabel Hill (3 March 1872 – 18 November 1956) was a New Zealand artist known for landscapes, portraits, and floral still lifes. She taught at the Wellington School of Design.

== Life ==
She was born at Cox's Creek, Auckland, New Zealand, the youngest child of Charles Hill, a hatter, and his wife, Eliza Ann Hulbert. Her eight siblings included the composer Alfred Hill. In 1875, the family moved to Wellington.

Hill attended primary school but not secondary school; instead, she went directly to the Wellington School of Design to study art in 1886. During her time at the Wellington School of Design, she met and was heavily influenced by the Scottish artist James M. Nairn, who introduced her to contemporary European art movements, especially Impressionism. She subsequently became a teacher at the school, remaining until 1897.

In 1898 she married John McIndoe, a printer, with whom she had four children. Her son John McIndoe was also an artist and later ran the family printing firm. Her son Archibald McIndoe was a plastic surgeon.

After their marriage, Hill and her husband moved to Dunedin, where they built a house with a studio for Hill. John died in 1916, and Hill then ran the printing business until her son took over.

She travelled extensively after her children left home until the outbreak of the Second World War, visiting the United States (where her son Archibald lived for a time), Tahiti, and Europe. At the end of the war, she left New Zealand to settle permanently in England to be near Archibald. She died in East Grinstead, West Sussex.

== Art career ==
Hill painted portraits, still lifes, and landscapes. Her style was influenced by Impressionism, and her palette tended toward muted colours. An avid gardener, she provided the illustrations for Barbara Douglas's book Pictures in a New Zealand Garden (1921). She exhibited mainly in New Zealand, in Dunedin, Christchurch, and Wellington, among other locations. Failing eyesight forced her to give up painting in the early 1950s.

She joined the Otago Art Society, exhibiting work under her birth name while serving on the society's council under her married name.

Hill also taught art. She had private students, and she taught at Archerfield College, a private girls' school (1922-1925), and at the Barn Studio with Alfred Henry O'Keeffe in the early 1920s.

Of Hill's 400 known works, most remain in private collections. A retrospective was mounted by the Dunedin Public Art Gallery in 1969.
