= G. P. Nerli =

Italian painter

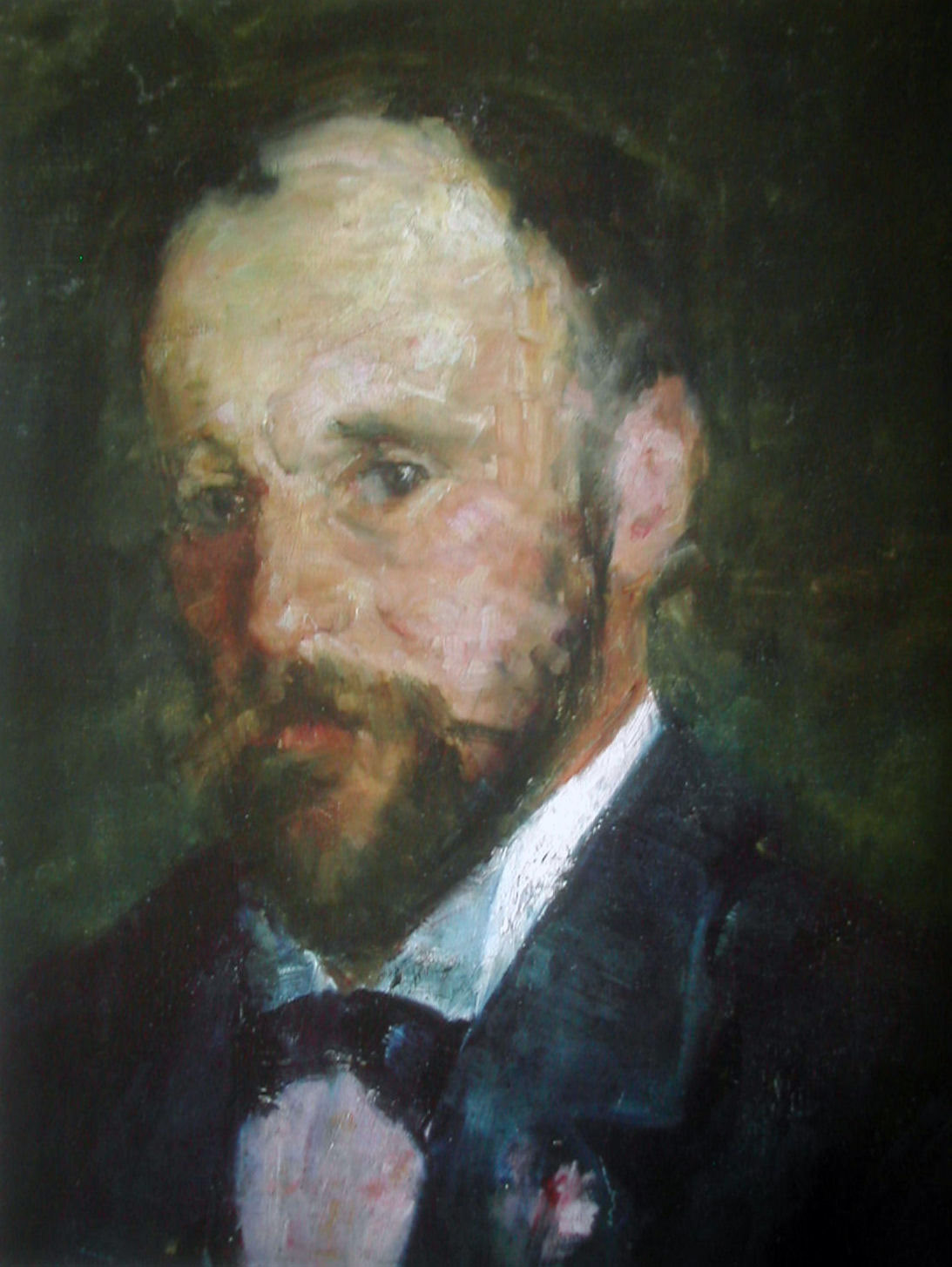
- Girolamo Pieri Pecci Ballati Nerli by F. Hodgkins
- Born: Girolamo Pieri Pecci Ballati Nerli; 12 February 1860; Siena, Italy
- Died: 24 June 1926 (aged 66)
- Known for: Painting

Girolamo Pieri Pecci Ballati Nerli (21 February 1860 – 24 June 1926) was an Italian-born painter who worked in Australia and New Zealand in the late 19th century, influencing the art scenes of both countries. In Australia, he is noted for influencing Charles Conder of the Heidelberg School movement, and in New Zealand, as an early teacher of Frances Hodgkins. His portrait of Robert Louis Stevenson in the Scottish National Portrait Gallery is usually considered the most searching portrayal of the writer.

== Biography ==
Born in Siena in Italy to an Italian aristocrat, Marchese Ferdinando Pieri Pecci Ballati Nerli, his full name was Girolamo Pieri Pecci Ballati Nerli. The fourth of six children, he was not a 'Marchese' as he was sometimes styled, or a 'Count', but a 'patrizio di Siena', a minor distinction marking the great antiquity of his family. His father married Henrietta Medwin, an Englishwoman. Her father Thomas Medwin was a minor literary figure in Byron's circle; Medwin was a second cousin on both parents' side of Shelley.

Girolamo studied art in Florence under Antonio Ciseri and Giovanni Muzzioli and was a younger member of the Italian Macchiaioli school, the 'patch painters', an Italian movement anticipating French impressionism.

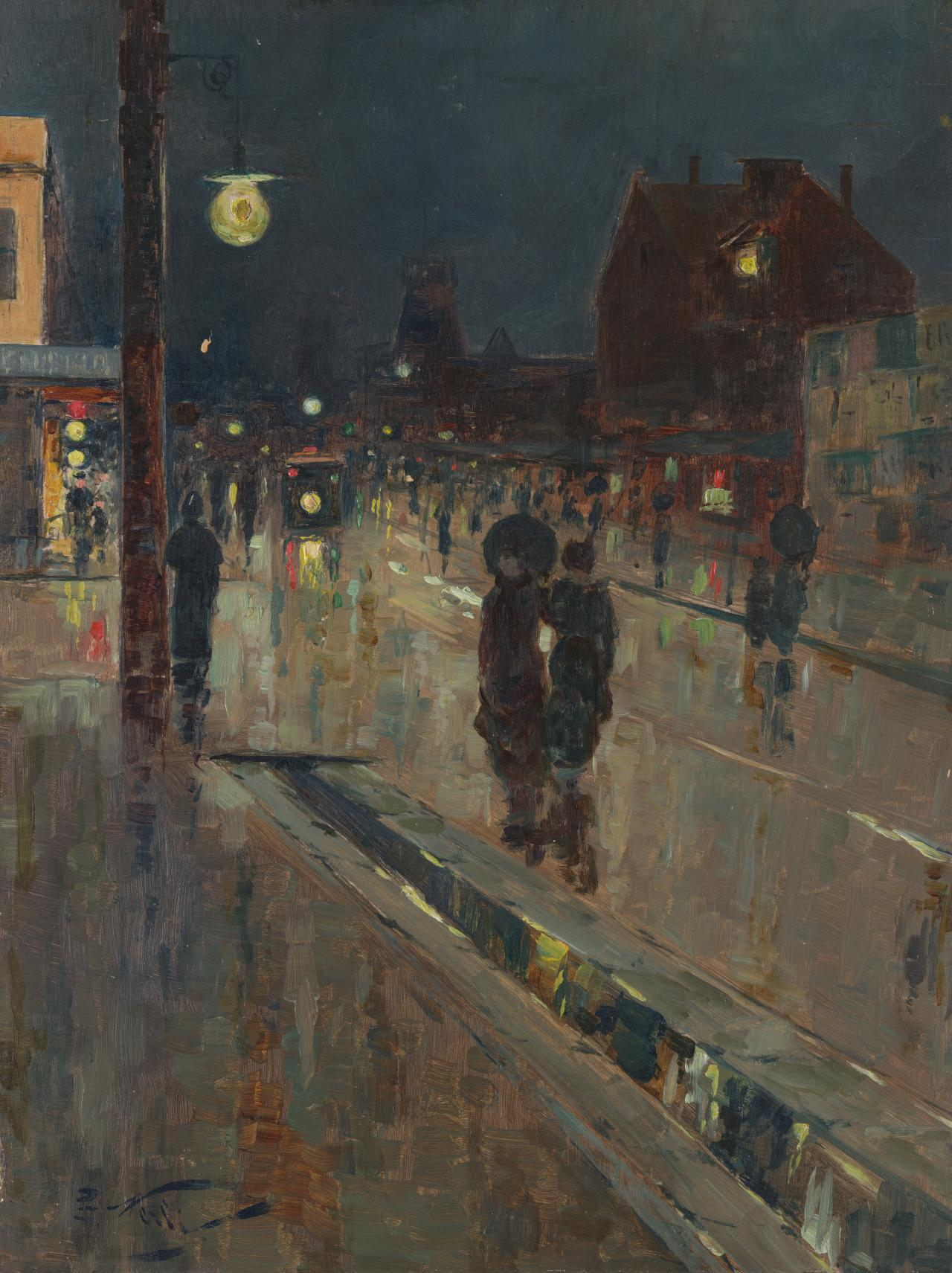
Street scene on a rainy night, c. 1889

He migrated to Australia in 1885, first settling in Melbourne, where he shared a studio with fellow Italian Ugo Catani and the Portuguese-born Artur Loureiro. Upon relocating to Sydney in 1886, Nerli exhibited with the Art Society of New South Wales (ASNSW). He caused a sensation there later that year with his exhibition of paintings of bacchanalian orgies, and at an 1888 show his portrait of actress Myra Kemble attracted much attention. The free brushwork and unfinished appearance of his works were as exciting to connoisseurs as the subjects were to the general public. Nerli also joined the ASNSW's en plein air sketch club. It was likely through this club that he met the young painter Charles Conder, who was later acknowledged as having been influenced by Nerli's style. Conder subsequently became a leading member of the impressionistic Heidelberg School movement alongside Tom Roberts and Arthur Streeton. The degree to which Nerli influenced the movement as a whole is a matter of contention, but his "delicacy of touch, decorative placement, and choice of subject matter" were shared by Conder and Streeton in particular, and he is known to have visited their "artists' camps" in both Melbourne and Sydney. Late in 1889 he went to Dunedin in New Zealand for the New Zealand and South Seas Exhibition where he encountered the artist Alfred Henry O'Keeffe. He went back to Australia in 1890.

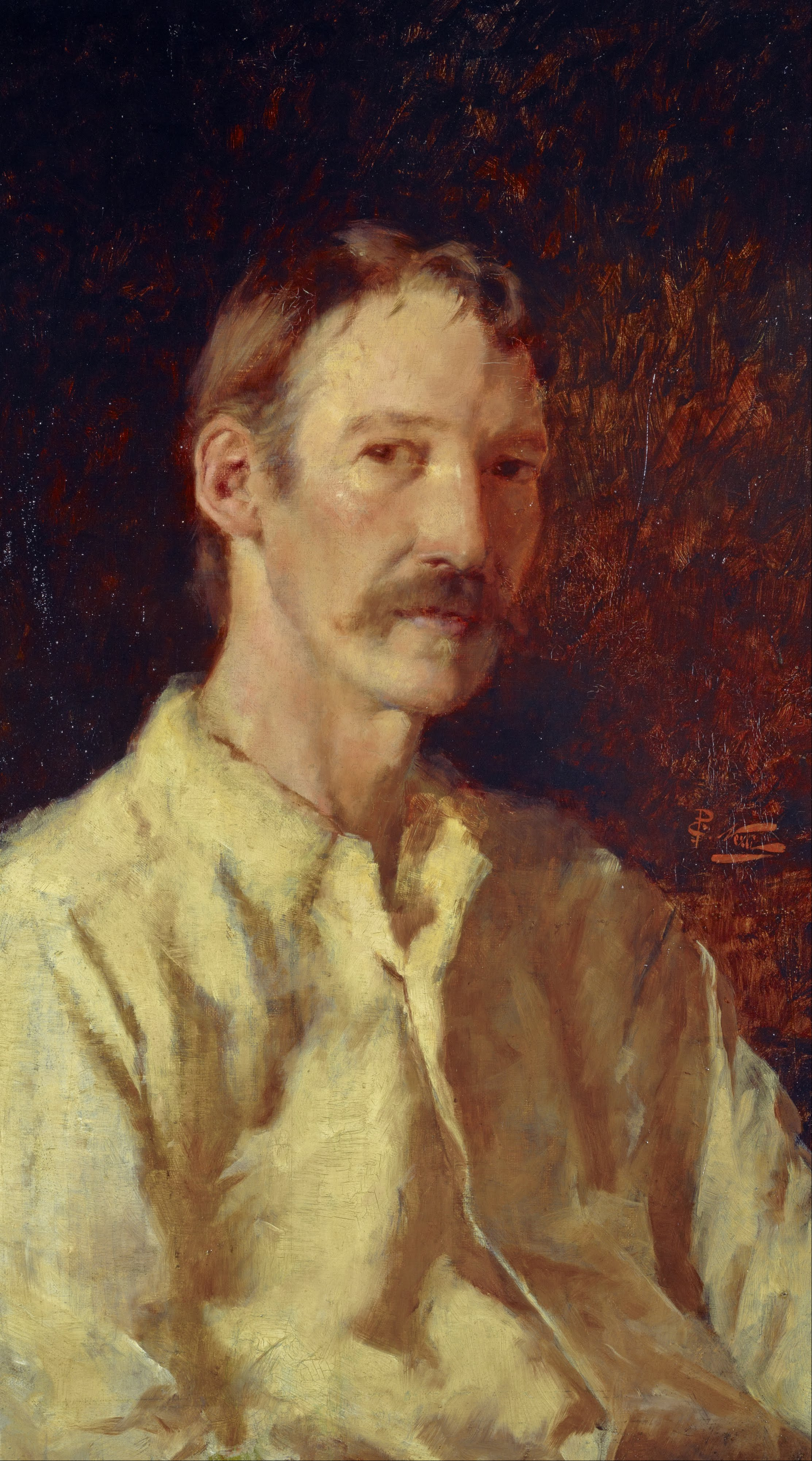
Portrait of Robert Louis Stevenson, 1892

In 1893 Nerli returned to Dunedin where he set himself up as a private art teacher. 'Signor Nerli' remained in the city just over three years bringing, new vigour to the circle presided over by W.M. Hodgkins and a cosmopolitan glamour to Dunedin's second, bohemian circle of younger painters. He taught Frances Hodgkins, inspired O'Keeffe and reportedly had an affair with Grace Joel, a young woman artist he may also have known in Melbourne. In 1893 Nerli was elected to the council of the Otago Art Society and in 1894 set up the Otago Art Academy with J.D. Perrett and L.W. Wilson in Dunedin's Octagon. Its life classes employing a professional nude model were so successful that the government run Dunedin School of Art had to hire Nerli for the same purpose. It seems this was the means by which painting from the nude was inaugurated at the school.

Late in 1896 Nerli left Dunedin suddenly, stayed briefly in Wellington and went on to Auckland. He opened a studio there and exhibited at the Auckland Society of Arts in April 1897. He then eloped with Marie Cecilia Josephine Barron whom he married in Christchurch New Zealand, in March 1898. She was a Spinster of 23, and he said he was a Bachelor and Artist of 38; he gave his name as Girolamo Pieri Ballati Pecci Nerli, but the surname in the index was "Pecci". The couple immediately sailed for Australia settling first in Sydney and then Melbourne. Nerli and his wife returned to Europe in 1904 where the artist spent the rest of his life, struggling against declining fortunes, between London and Nervi, Genoa in Italy. He died childless in Nervi on 24 June 1926.

== Legacy ==
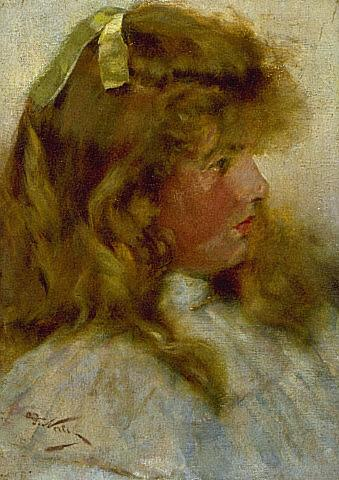
A study (Head of a girl), c. 1895, Auckland Art Gallery

An occasionally brilliant painter, Nerli brought something of the new influences emerging in Europe to the Australasian art scene, helping to shift the direction of Australian and New Zealand art. In Charles Conder and Frances Hodgkins he influenced those countries' most notable expatriates. A few of his works have secured him a lasting place in Australia's and New Zealand's art histories. The Sitting (1889) is worthy of James Tissot, and Nerli's lost work, The Ascension (c.1887) was a technical tour de force anticipating aspects of 20th-century art. His landscapes of the Heidelberg period, Beach Scene, Black Rock and Fitzroy Gardens (both c. 1889) show him combining the new objectivity which superseded romantic landscape with a lyricism worthy of the French Impressionists. However, his greatest achievements are a few penetrating portraits, that of Robert Louis Stevenson already mentioned, his Portrait of Dr. D.M. Stuart (1894), Portrait of W.M. Hodgkins (1893) in the Hocken Collections Dunedin, and his Portrait of a Young Woman Artist (c.1889), also in the Hocken. These works capture elusive psychological states, Stevenson's illness and Stuart's nearness to death. Nerli's Portrait of a Girl (1894?) in the collection of the Dunedin Public Art Gallery is a minor masterpiece, brilliantly evoking the ambivalence of adolescence.

Nerli is represented in the Australian National Gallery, most of the Australian state galleries and the principal public collections of New Zealand.

== List of works ==
- Works in the collection of the Museum of New Zealand Te Papa Tongarewa
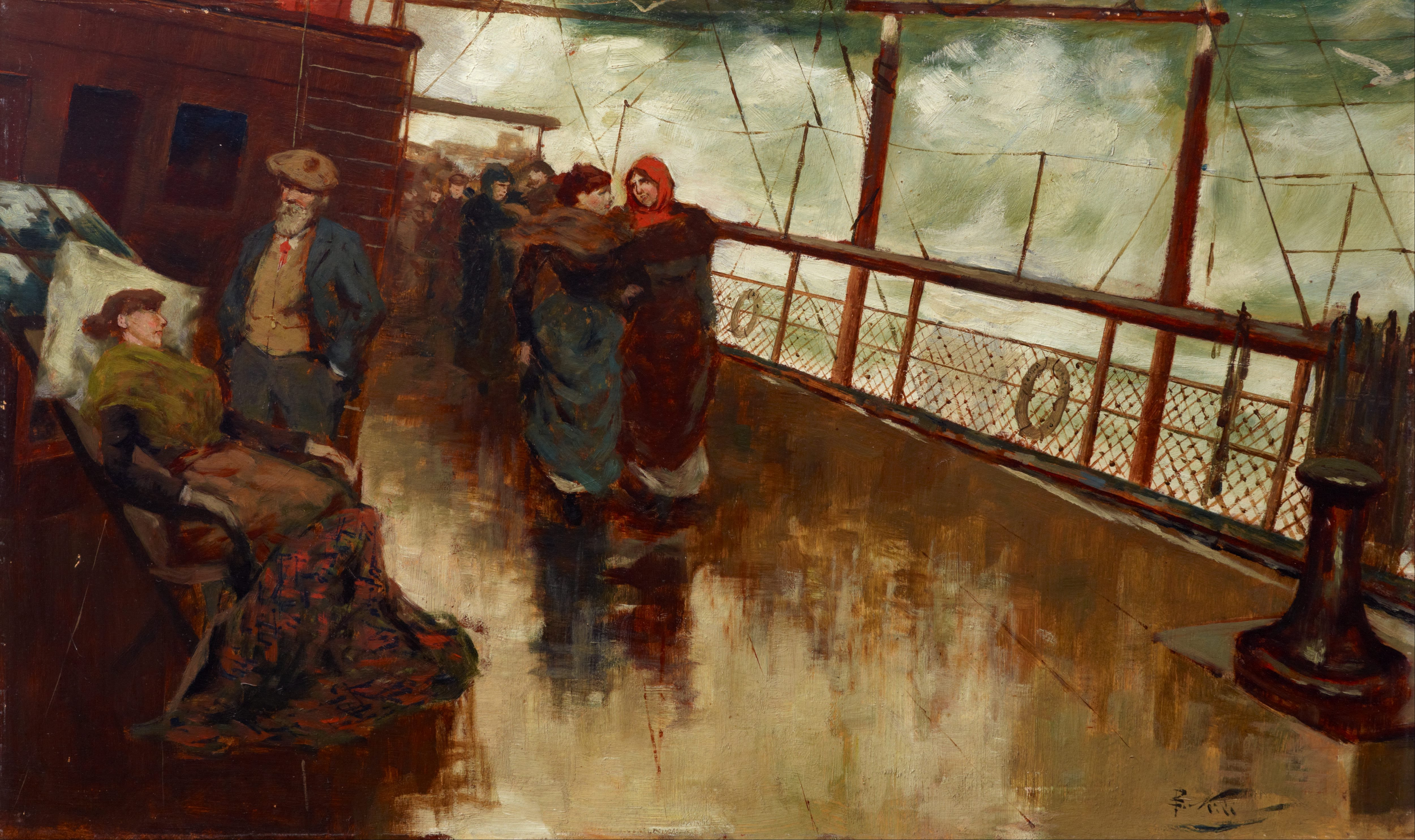
The voyagers

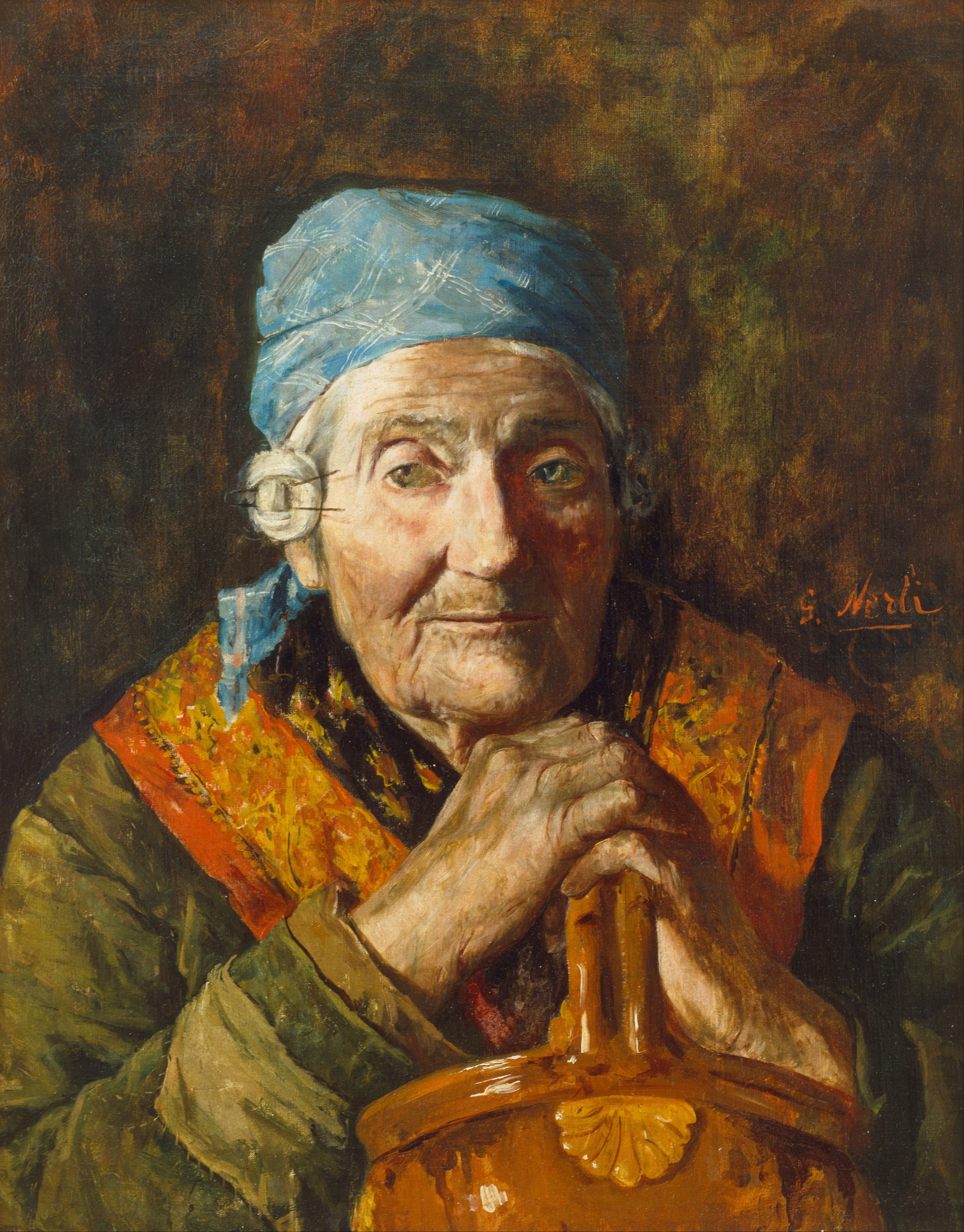
An old woman (study)

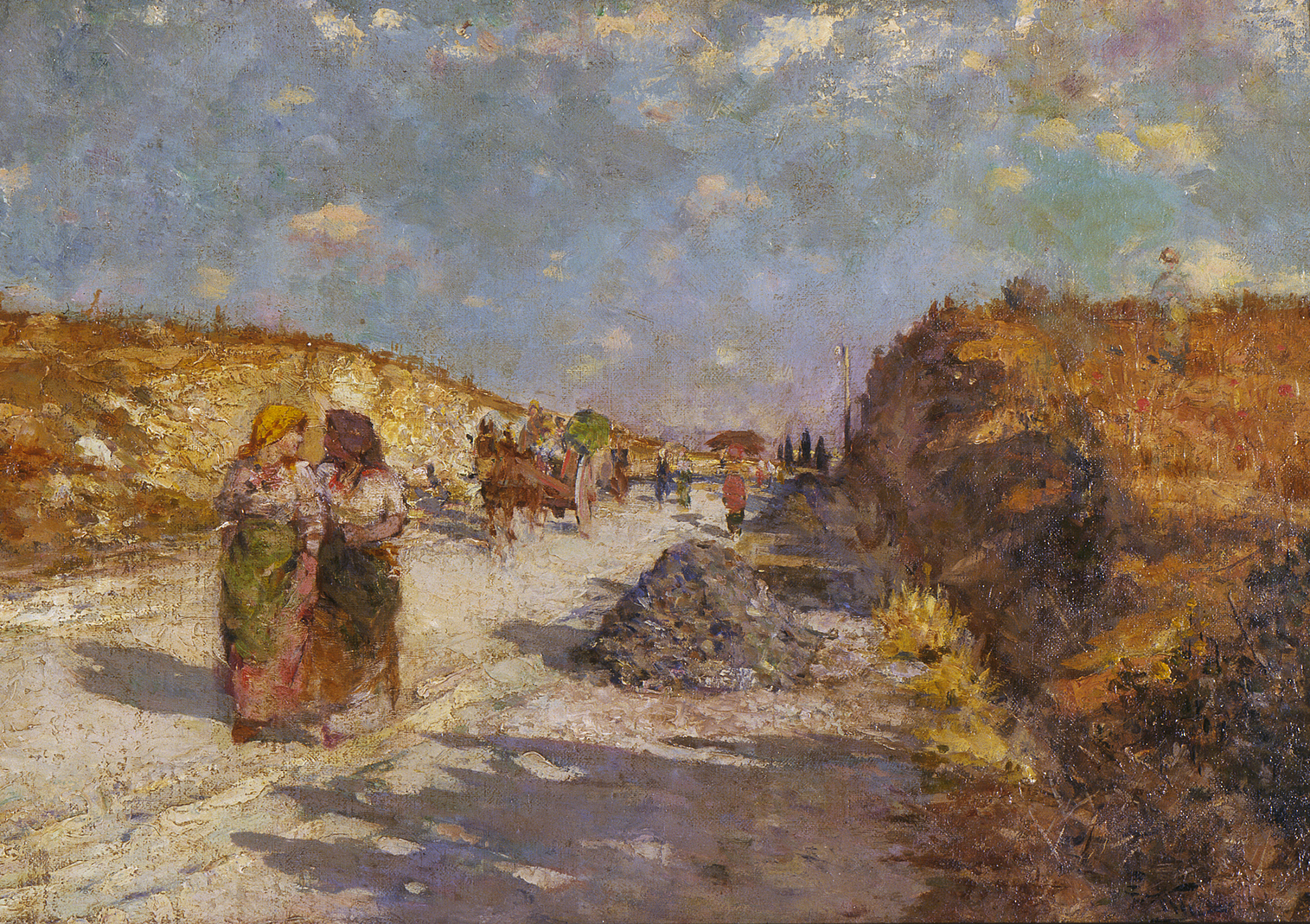
Market day in Rome

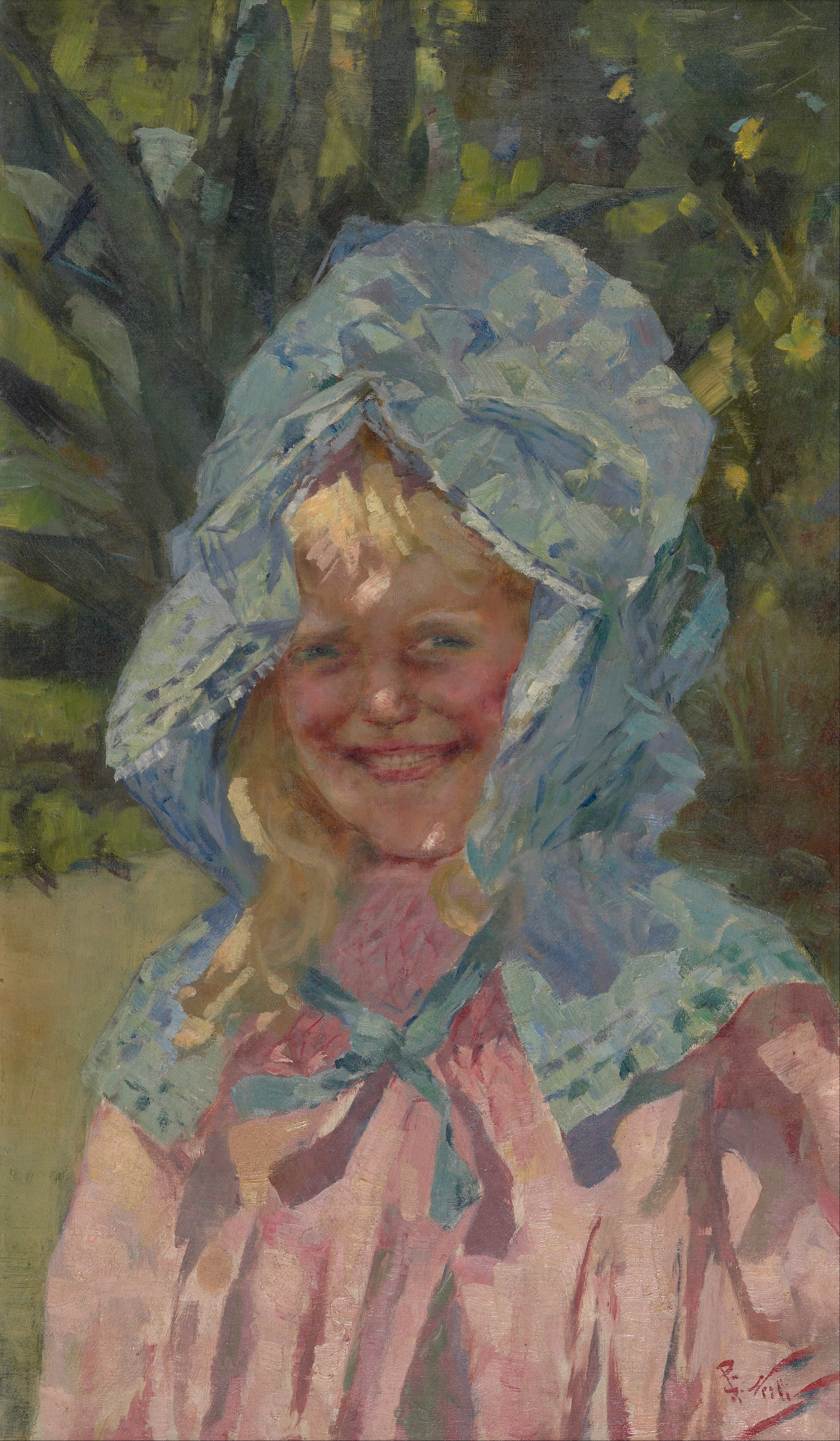
Girl in sunbonnet

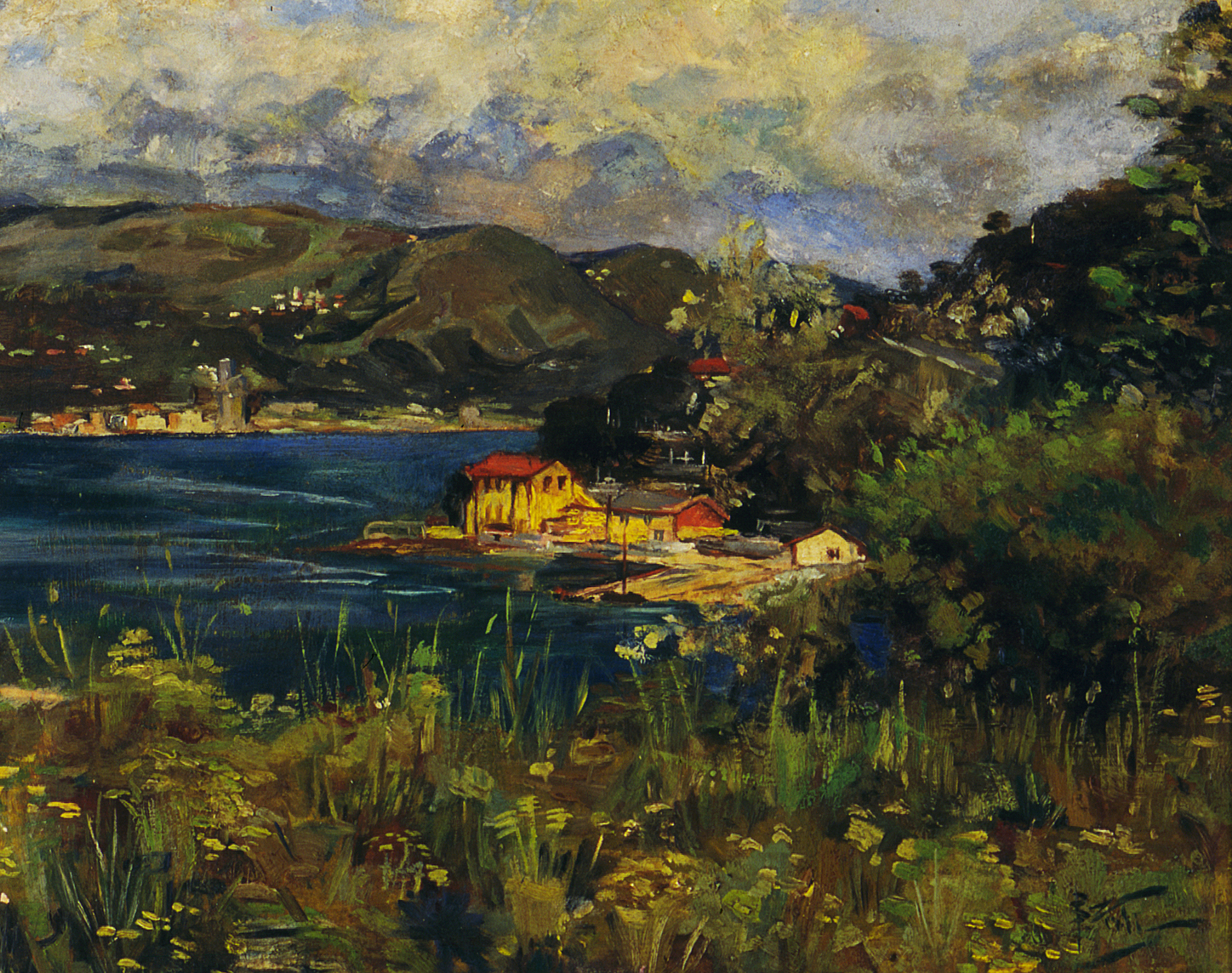
Untitled (Bay landscape)
