= John McIndoe (artist) =

New Zealand artist and printer

John Leslie McIndoe (18 November 1898 – 9 May 1995) was a New Zealand artist and printer, and a war artist in World War II. His parents were John McIndoe who founded the family printing firm, and Mabel Hill the artist.

He was educated at Otago Boys' High School, and after training in the printing industry in Sydney in 1916–19 went into the family printing firm. After taking over the management of the firm in 1924 he purchased colour printing machines, and the firm produced many items required for the New Zealand and South Seas Exhibition in 1925–26.

He understated his age to join the Army in World War II, and sailed with the First Echelon in December 1939. Captured in Crete in 1941, he was a prisoner-of-war in Germany. There he produced over 300 landscapes, portraits and sketches, and held an exhibition of them in London when he was released in April 1945. Postwar he produced mainly pastels of the Central Otago landscape.

He married Olga Roberts McConnachie in 1922; they had three sons. He was involved in several Dunedin clubs and societies: flying, swimming and surf lifesaving, serving on several organisations and on the Dunedin City Council 1931–35. He retired in 1961, and in 1973–74 moved to what had been a holiday home near Māpua, in what is now the Tasman District. He died in Nelson.
