= Arthur Dewhurst Riley =

English-born New Zealand artist, educationalist and businessman

Arthur Dewhurst Riley (18 February 1860 – 29 August 1929) was an English-born New Zealand artist, educationalist and businessman. Riley was an advocate of technical education, and had a significant impact on the provision of technical and vocation education in New Zealand.

He graduated from Royal College of Art in London in 1881, and emigrated to Melbourne. In 1885 he moved to Wellington to take up a position with the Wellington Education Board. In 1886, he founded the Wellington School of Design, later renamed the Wellington Technical School, and was its director for a number of years.
