= John McIndoe (printer) =

New Zealand printer

John McIndoe (29 November 1858–4 April 1916) was a New Zealand printer. He was born in Rothesay, Bute, Scotland on 29 November 1858.

He married the painter Mabel Hill in 1898. One son, Archibald McIndoe, was a plastic surgeon; and another son, John McIndoe, was an artist who took over the family printing firm.
