= Frances Hodgkins =

New Zealand painter (1869–1947)

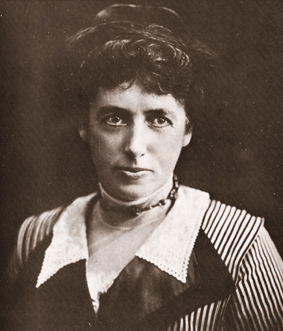
- Born: 28 April 1869; Dunedin, New Zealand
- Died: 13 May 1947 (aged 78); Dorchester, Dorset, England
- Resting place: Waikanae Cemetery
- Education: Columba College; Dunedin School of Art and Design; London Polytechnic
- Known for: Modernist artist
- Movement: British Modernism
- Website: www.franceshodgkins.com

Frances Mary Hodgkins (28 April 1869 – 13 May 1947) was a New Zealand painter chiefly of landscape, and for a short period was a designer of textiles. Born in Dunedin, she was educated at Dunedin School of Art, then became an art teacher, earning money to study in England.

A modernist artist, Hodgkins' artworks were known for abstracted, simplified forms and a strong emphasis on colour values and relationships. Hodgkins was considered to be a key figure in British Modernism, also considered one of New Zealand's most prestigious and influential painters. However, it is the work from Hodgkins' life in Europe, rather than her home country, on which her reputation rests.

== Early life and education ==
Hodgkins was born in Dunedin, New Zealand, in 1869, the daughter of Rachel Owen Parker and W. M. Hodgkins, a lawyer, amateur painter, and a leading figure in the city's art circles.

She and her sister, Isabel (later Field) attended Braemar House, a private girls' secondary school; both sisters demonstrated artistic talent early on and each became a successful landscape painter in their own right. Her father was declared bankrupt in 1888, and money remained an issue for Hodgkins throughout her life.

Hodgkins first exhibited landscapes and portraits in 1890 at art societies in Christchurch and Dunedin. In 1893, Hodgkins became a student of Girolamo Nerli and painted numerous studies of female sitters, one of which earned her the New Zealand Academy of Arts' prize for painting from life in 1895 (Head of an Old Woman). Hodgkin's portraits of Māori are, like many by Ellen von Meyern and Gottfried Lindauer, associated with symbolic portraits of demure females with or without a child. In 1895–96 Hodgkins attended the Dunedin School of Art and subsequently became an art teacher, earning money to study in England.

== Career ==
In 1901, Hodgkins left New Zealand for Europe, enrolling in art school in London but also travelling and painting in France, the Netherlands, Italy and Morocco in the company of friend and fellow artist Dorothy Kate Richmond; whom she described as "the dearest woman with the most beautiful face and expression. I am a lucky beggar to have her as a travelling companion." While in Britain she intermittently met up with Margaret Stoddart, another expatriate artist. In 1903, one of Hodgkins' watercolours from this period (Fatima) became the first work by a New Zealander to be hung "on the line" at the Royal Academy of Arts in London.

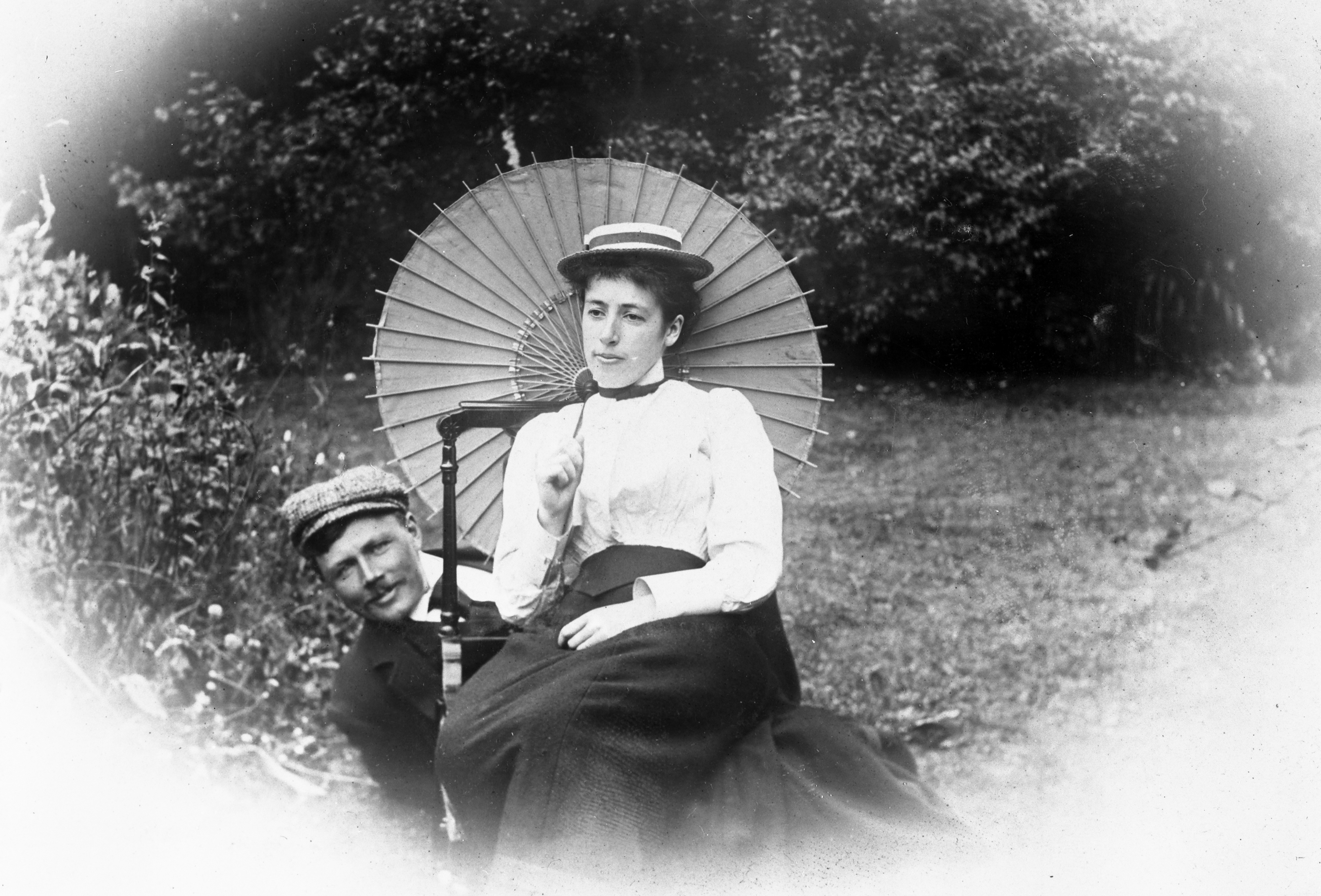
Frances Hodgkins with her brother-in-law, William Field

She returned to New Zealand in 1903 and established a teaching studio in Wellington, where she held a joint exhibition with Richmond in 1904. Among her pupils was Edith Kate Bendall, lover of Katherine Mansfield. In the same year Hodgkins became engaged to a British man, T. Boughton Wilby, but the engagement was broken off and she returned to London in 1906 to pursue her artistic career.

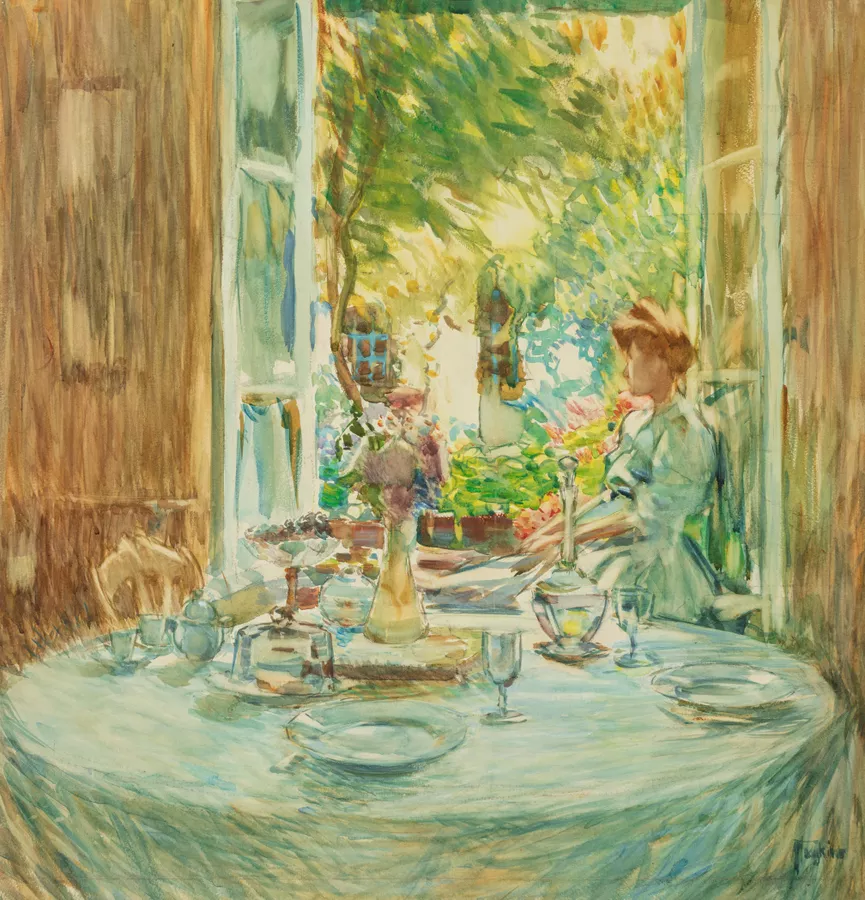
At the Window, 1912, watercolour on paper

In Europe, Hodgkins held her first solo show at the Paterson's Gallery in London in 1907 and in 1908 was awarded the joint first award (value £50), with Thea Proctor, in a Franco-British exhibition in London to mark the fourth anniversary of the Entente Cordiale agreement. Later that year she moved to Paris. In In 1910 she began teaching in Paris at Academie Colarossi as the first woman to be appointed instructor in the school. She also founded a School for Water Colour in Concarneau. During this time she exhibited numerous watercolours at the Paris salon and came in contact with Canadian artist, Emily Carr, whom she taught while working on seascapes at Concarneau in Brittany.

During World War I she spent some time in Zennor, Cornwall, where she worked with the Swansea painter, Cedric Morris, who painted her portrait in 1917. She herself began to paint in oils in 1915.

In 1919, after the WWI, Hodgkins went to France, where she was influenced by Matisse and Derain, but developed her own highly personal style, which made a strong impact at her one-person show in London at the Claridge Gallery in 1928. While in France she visited Nice in 1924 and there met Margaret Butler, a notable New Zealand sculptor.

In 1925, Hodgkins started work as a fabric designer at the Calico Printers' Association (CPA) in Manchester and during her employment visited the Exposition Internationale des Arts Decoratifs in Paris.

From the late 1920s on her style came to embrace modernist hallmarks such as abstracted, simplified forms and a strong emphasis on colour values and relationships. Although Hodgkins continued to paint people, her work from this period also evidences an interest in fusing conventions of landscape with still life painting. In 1929 she joined the Seven and Five Society and worked alongside younger artists including Barbara Hepworth, Ben Nicholson and Henry Moore. In 1930, she "goaded" her friend Lucy Wertheim into opening her gallery in London to exhibit "artists who had not yet arrived".

During the 1930s Hodgkins exhibited with many prominent London galleries and gained a contract from the Lefevre Gallery to produce work for a full-scale exhibition every second year. In 1931 she became a painting companion of fellow New Zealand artist Maude Burge and painted still lifes at Burge's Villa in the garden terrace. Saint-Tropez. Her experimentation with mixing artistic genres continued, resulting in paintings that conflate still life with self-portraiture to sidestep physical appearance in self-representation. In 1939 she was invited to represent Britain at the 1940 Venice Biennale, but wartime travel restrictions meant that her work could not be transported to Venice. She was highly regarded by British avant-garde society and in the later stages of her career was known as a key figure in British Modernism.

Because of World War II Hodgkins spent the rest of her life in Britain. She continued to paint into her seventies, despite suffering from rheumatism and bronchitis. She died in Dorchester, Dorset on 13 May 1947. When she died she was regarded as one of Britain's leading artists. After her death her close friend and fellow artist Amy Krauss, boxed up the possessions from her studio and arranged for her ashes to be returned to New Zealand.

== Legacy ==
In 1948 Myfanwy Evans (later Piper) wrote a concise book entitled Frances Hodgkins, as part of the 'Penguin Modern Painters' series, and the two were the only woman author and woman artist in the series of eighteen books.

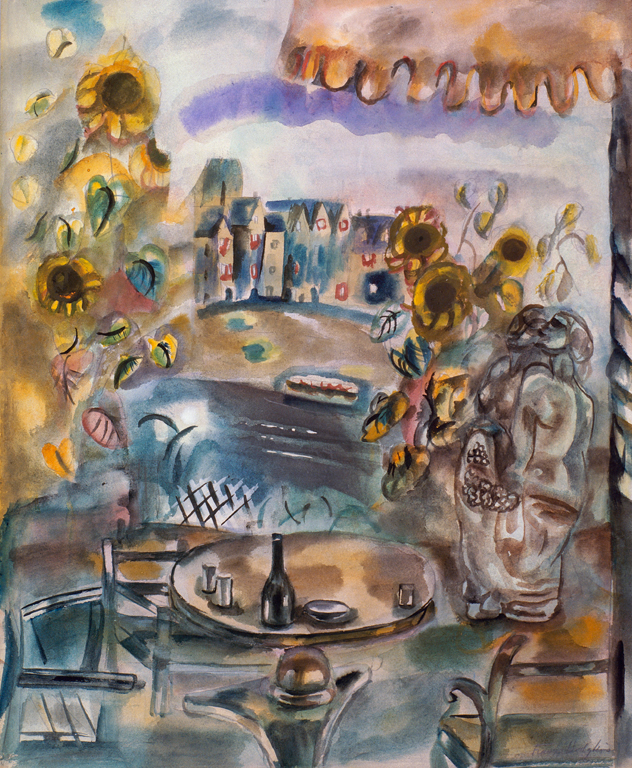
Pleasure Garden, 1932 watercolour

The Christchurch City Council finally accepted the watercolour Pleasure Garden (1932) into the collection of the Robert McDougall Art Gallery in 1951. The painting had been offered and refused in 1948 and was the subject of considerable controversy over the intervening years. The painting was regarded as being too modern and was initially declined due to it being "artistically unworthy of acceptance".

Hodgkins was featured in a 2025 episode of the thirteenth series of BBC's art documentary programme Fake or Fortune, presented by art dealer Philip Mould and journalist Fiona Bruce.

In 2025 she was one of the artists included in the Dangerously Modern exhibition at the Art Gallery of New South Wales of works created by Australian women artists in Europe between 1890 and 1940.

== Fellowship ==
The Frances Hodgkins Fellowship, established in 1962 at the University of Otago in Dunedin, New Zealand, is named after her.

== Works in collections ==
Title	Year	Medium	Gallery no.	Gallery	Location
Portrait of a girl in a sunbonnet	circa 1895	Pastel and gouache on paper	80/154	Hocken Collections	Dunedin, New Zealand
Māori woman and child	1900	Watercolour	1936-0012-62	Museum of New Zealand Te Papa Tongarewa	Wellington, New Zealand
The market place, San Remo, Italy	1902	Watercolour	1950-0005-001	Museum of New Zealand Te Papa Tongarewa	Wellington, New Zealand
A Dutch girl	circa 1907	Watercolour	1936-0012-50	Museum of New Zealand Te Papa Tongarewa	Wellington, New Zealand
Le Reveil (mother and child)	circa 1912	Watercolour	1955/31	Auckland Art Gallery	Auckland, New Zealand
Loveday and Ann: Two Women with a Basket of Flowers	1915	Oil on canvas	N05456	Tate	London, United Kingdom
The Edwardians	circa 1918	Oil on canvas	1969/13	Auckland Art Gallery	Auckland, New Zealand
Mrs Hellyer	circa 1919	Oil on canvas	PLYMG.1969.4	Plymouth Museums Galleries Archives	Plymouth, United Kingdom
Portrait of Arthur Lett-Haines	1920	Oil on canvas	2006-0030-1	Museum of New Zealand Te Papa Tongarewa	Wellington, New Zealand
Double Portrait	1922	Oil on canvas	73/96	Hocken Collections	Dunedin, New Zealand
The fair by the sea	1927(?)	Watercolour	1974-0009-1	Museum of New Zealand Te Papa Tongarewa	Wellington, New Zealand
Flowers in a Vase	circa 1928	Oil on canvas	4513	Government Art Collection	London, United Kingdom
Still Life	circa 1929	Oil on canvas	EASTG 1260	Towner Art Gallery	Eastbourne, United Kingdom
Still Life: Eggs, Tomatoes and Mushrooms	circa 1929	Oil on canvas	H1940_92	Royal Pavilion & Museums, Brighton & Hove	Brighton, United Kingdom
Cedric Morris (Man with Macaw)	1930	Oil on canvas	EASTG 1262	Towner Art Gallery	Eastbourne, United Kingdom
Flatford Mill	1930	Oil on canvas	N05978	Tate	London, United Kingdom
Flatford Mill, Suffolk	1930	Oil on canvas	EASTG 1263	Towner Art Gallery	Eastbourne, United Kingdom
Wings over Water	1930	Oil on canvas	N06237	Tate	London, United Kingdom
Berries and Laurel	circa 1930	Oil on canvas	1982/46/2	Auckland Art Gallery	Auckland, New Zealand
Cut melons	circa 1931	Oil on cardboard	1980-0063-2	Museum of New Zealand Te Papa Tongarewa	Wellington, New Zealand
Fish	1931	Watercolour	P2564	British Council	United Kingdom
Sabrina's Garden	circa 1932	Oil on canvas	K1669	Bristol Museum & Art Gallery	Bristol, United Kingdom
Wings over Water	circa 1932	Oil on canvas	LEEAG.PA.1940.0022	Leeds Art Gallery	Leeds, United Kingdom
Spanish Peasants	1934	Oil on plywood	CHCPH 1017-14	Pallant House Gallery	Chichester, United Kingdom
Still life: Self-portrait	circa 1935	Oil on panel	1999-0017-1	Museum of New Zealand Te Papa Tongarewa	Wellington, New Zealand
The Weir	circa 1935	Oil on canvas	2846	Glasgow Museums	Glasgow, Scotland
Double Portrait No.2 (Katherine and Anthony West)	1937	Oil on canvas	1967-0006-1	Museum of New Zealand Te Papa Tongarewa	Wellington, New Zealand
Tanks, Barrels and Drums	1937	Oil on canvas	6752	Government Art Collection	London, United Kingdom
Houses and Outhouses, Purbeck	1938	Oil on canvas	P75	British Council Collection	London, United Kingdom
The Painted Chest	1938	Oil on panel	OS00094	William Evans Bequest, Bangor University	Bangor, Wales
Cheviot Farm	circa 1938	Oil on canvas	1947.445	Manchester Art Gallery	Manchester, United Kingdom
Broken pottery	1939	Watercolour	1971-0044-1	Museum of New Zealand Te Papa Tongarewa	Wellington, New Zealand
Landscape	circa 1939	Gouache on paper	3561	Government Art Collection	London, United Kingdom
Purbeck Courtyard, Morning	1944	Oil on canvas	1362	Southampton City Art Gallery	Southampton, United Kingdom

The Dunedin Public Art Gallery, in Dunedin, New Zealand, contains a major collection of almost sixty of Hodgkins' works, and has a dedicated gallery space which displays works by Hodgkins, often alongside works by her contemporaries.

== Gallery ==
Works by Frances Hodgkins

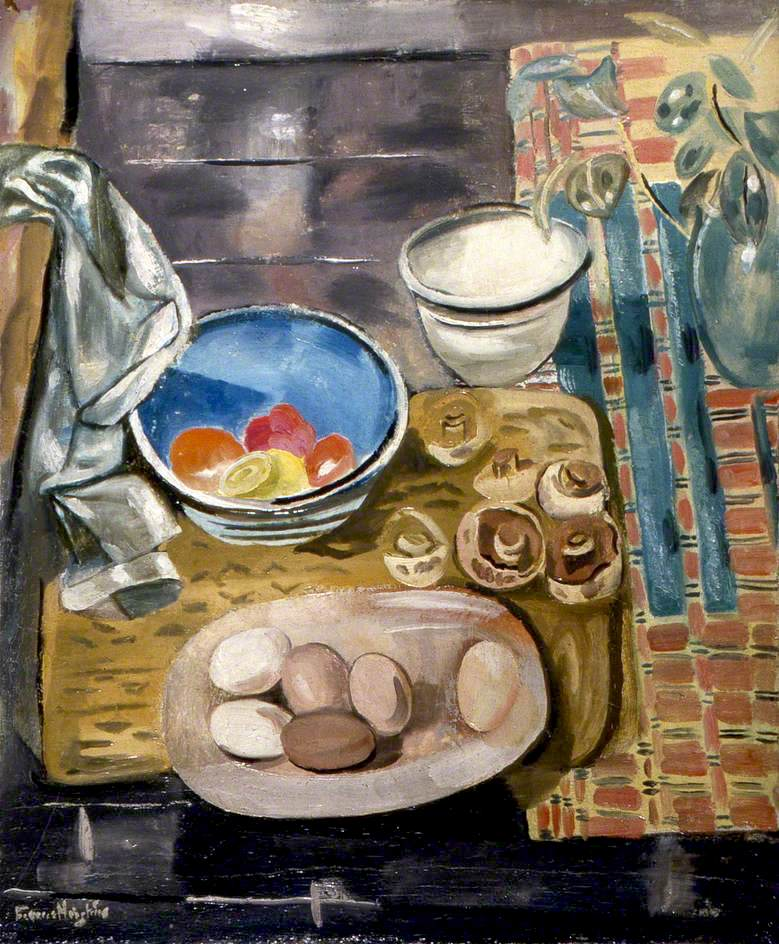
Still life eggs, tomatoes and mushrooms

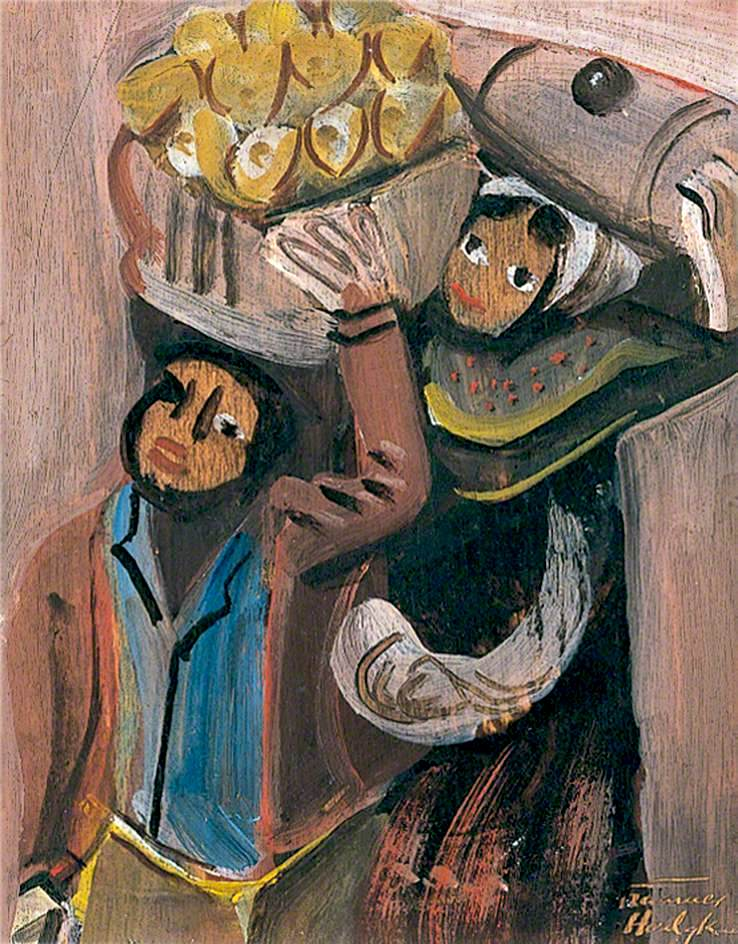
Spanish peasants

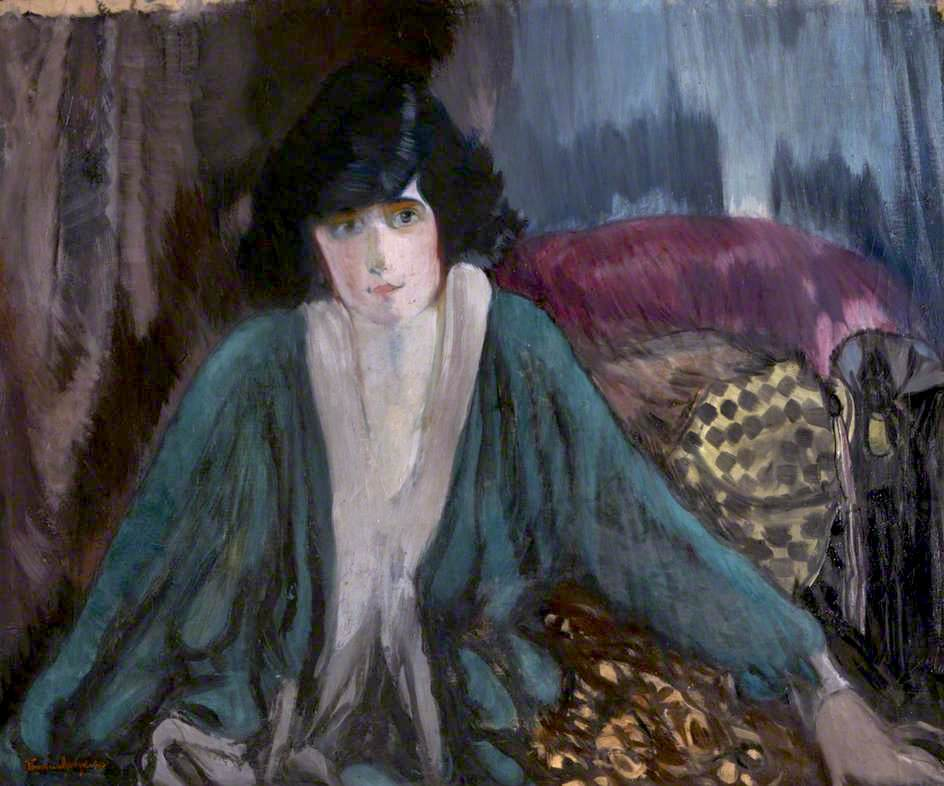
Mrs. Hellyer

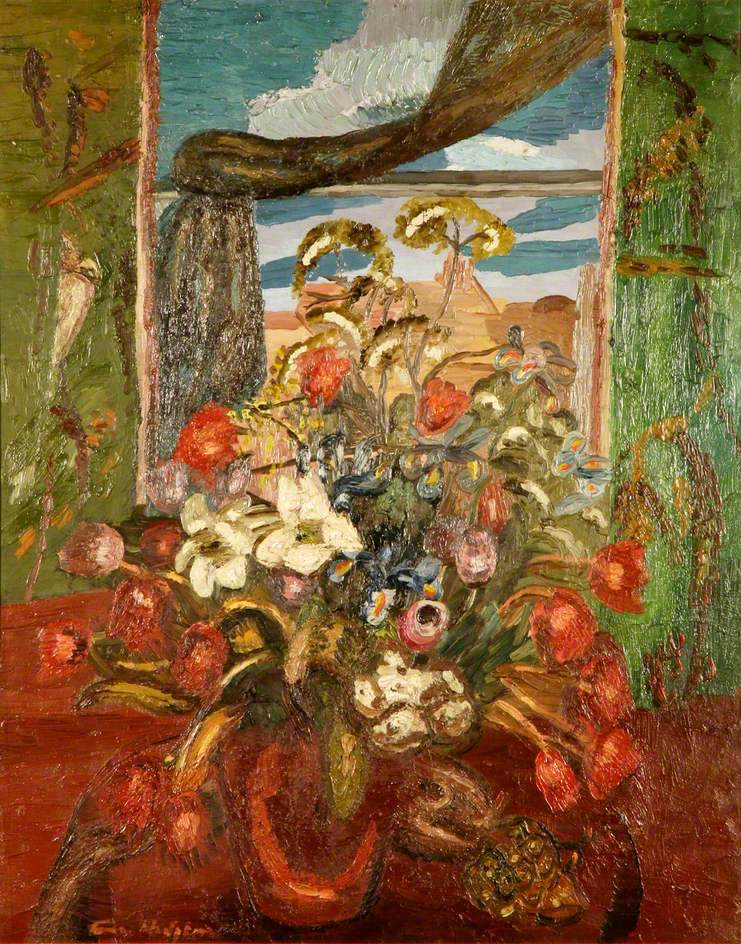
Flowers in a vase

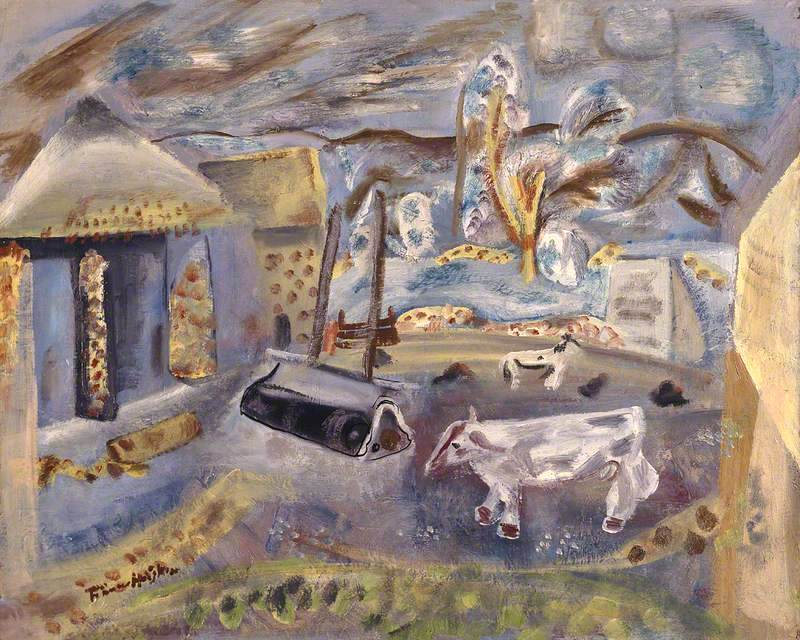
Cheviot farm

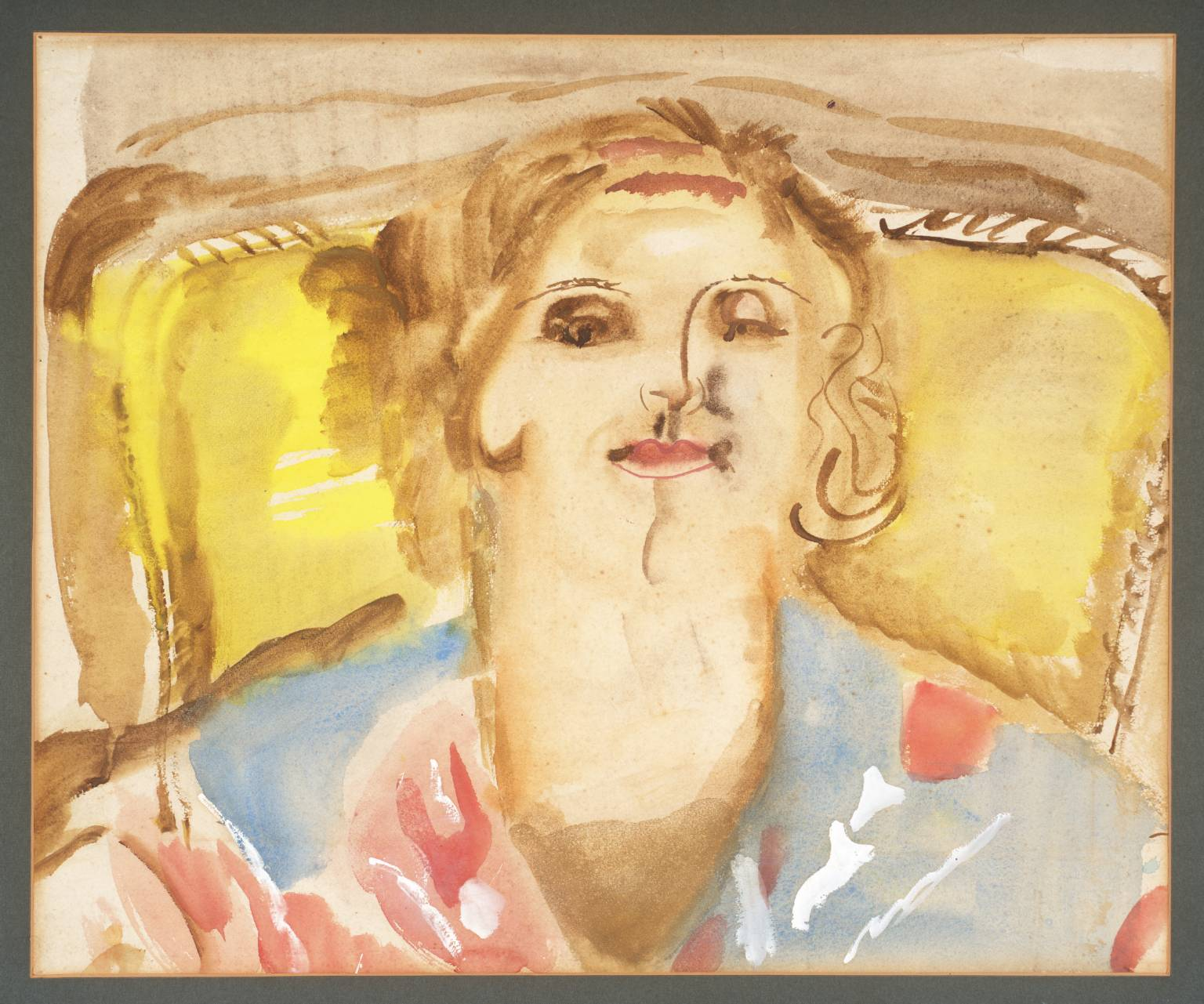
Portrait of Kitty West 1939
