= Dorothy Kate Richmond =

New Zealand painter

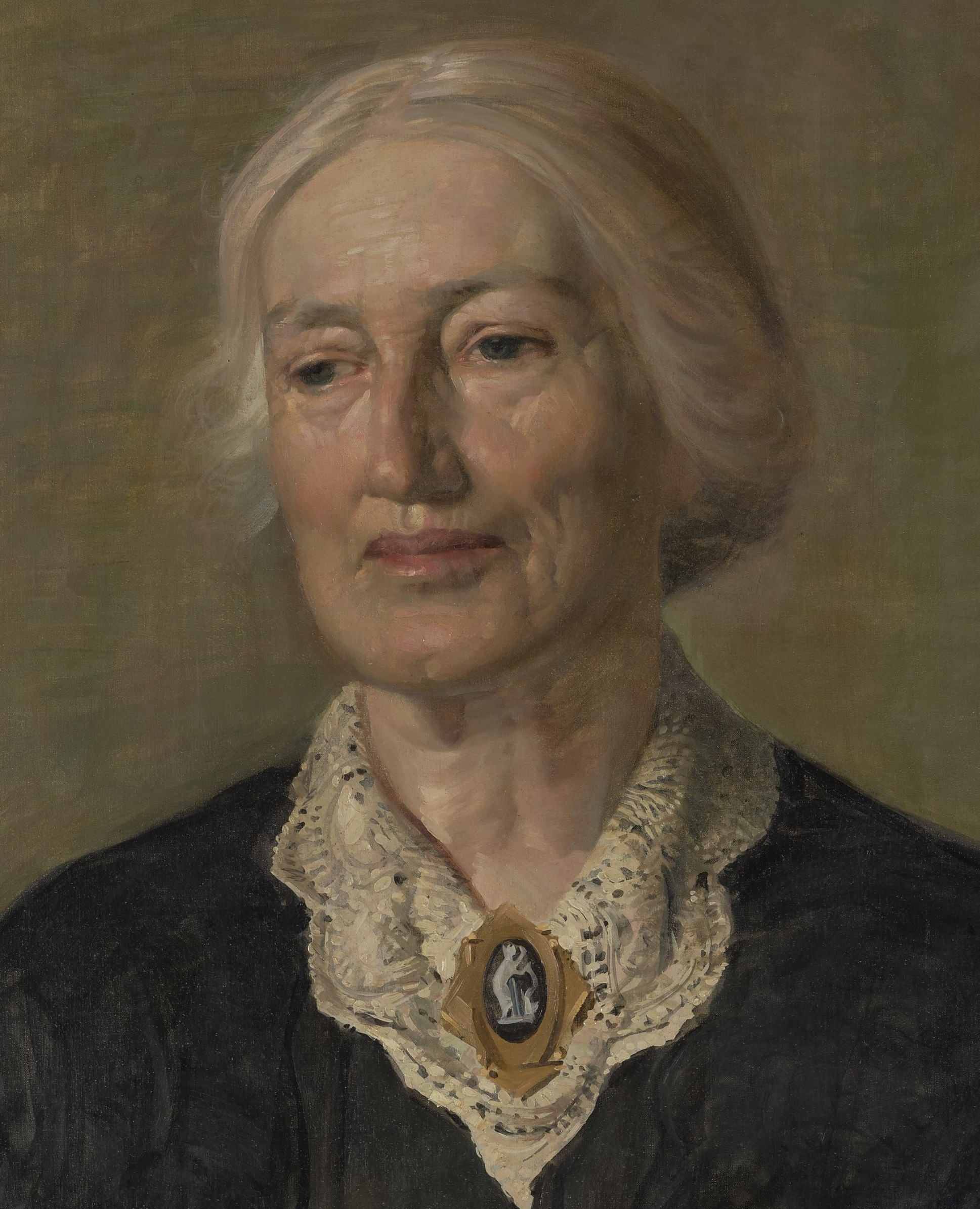
- Portrait (cropped) of Richmond by Harry Linley Richardson
- Born: 12 September 1861; Parnell, Auckland
- Died: 16 April 1935 (aged 73); Wellington, New Zealand
- Education: Bedford College for Women; Slade School of Art
- Known for: Painting

Dorothy Kate Richmond (12 September 1861 – 16 April 1935), sometimes known as Dolla Richmond, was a New Zealand painter most noted for her watercolour paintings of flowers and landscapes.

== Early life and education ==
The daughter of James Crowe Richmond and Mary Smith, Dorothy Richmond was born on 12 September 1861 in Parnell, Auckland. She was the third of five children and her young childhood was unsettled. The family moved to Nelson in 1862 where her father had become the editor of The Nelson Examiner and New Zealand Chronicle but moved to the Taranaki district after the sudden death of Dorothy's mother in 1865. Her father was often away from home and she and her siblings were farmed out to relatives before the family moved back to Nelson in around 1869.

Richmond attended Miss Bell's Young Ladies' College in Nelson and her interest in art was encouraged by her father who passed on his love of drawing and painting to her. She was taken with her two elder siblings to Europe by her father in 1873 and continued her drawing lessons. She attended Bedford College for Women in London, and also attended the Slade School of Fine Art where she worked under Alphonse Legros. By June 1880 her work gained her a Slade Scholarship.

== Career ==
In the early 1880s Richmond returned to New Zealand and was appointed the art mistress at the newly opened Nelson College for Girls in 1883.

Richmond exhibited with the New Zealand Academy of Fine Arts from 1885. By 1890 she had become an artist member of the New Zealand Academy of Fine Arts and by 1896 was studying with James Nairn.

Richmond became financially independent after the death of her father in 1898 and she again travelled to Europe to paint. She met Frances Hodgkins in 1901 and travelled with her in Europe, visiting France, Belgium, the United Kingdom, the Netherlands and Italy, before returning to New Zealand together in December 1903. Hodgkins described Richmond as "the dearest woman with the most beautiful face and expression. I am a lucky beggar to have her as a travelling companion." Norman Garstin painted Richmond's portrait in Europe in 1903, and the oil painting is in the Te Papa collection.

Back in New Zealand, Richmond and Hodgkins remained close partners and rented a studio together in Bowen Street, Wellington, where they also took on private pupils. Richmond keep the studio on after Hodgkins returned to Europe in 1906 and continued to develop her reputation as an art teacher. From around 1909 to 1924 she held classes at Fitzherbert Terrace School, which later became Samuel Marsden Collegiate School.

Richmond served on the council of the New Zealand Academy of Fine Arts from 1904 to 1926 and from 1930 to 1935. In 1928 she was honored as a life member. She played a significant role in the local arts community, championing purchases by fellow artists such as Frances Hodgkins and Margaret Stoddart.

Richmond died in Wellington on 16 April 1935.

== List of works ==
- Works by D. K. Richmond in the collection of the Museum of New Zealand Te Papa Tongarewa
- Works by D. K. Richmond in the collection of Auckland Art Gallery Toi o Tāmaki
