= Wellington High School, New Zealand =

Wellington High School & Community Education Centre
- Māori: Te Kura Tuarua o Taraika ki Pukeahu

Location
- 249 Taranaki Street; Wellington, 6011; New Zealand; 41.3009°S 174.7748°E

Information
- Type: State secondary
- Motto: Excellence in Learning
- Established: 1886
- Ministry of Education Institution no.: 273
- Chairman: David Cooling
- Principal: Dominic Killalea
- Grades: 9–13
- Gender: Coeducational
- Enrolment: 1,642 (July 2026)
- Socio-economic decile: 9Q
- Website: www.whs.school.nz

Wellington High School is a co-educational secondary school in the CBD of Wellington, New Zealand. It has a roll of approximately 1600 students. It was founded in 1886 as the Wellington College of Design (later the Wellington Technical School), to provide a more practical education than that offered by the existing schools. In 1905 it became the first coeducational daytime Technical College in New Zealand. It is one of only two coeducational secondary schools in Wellington (along with Onslow College), and one of only a handful in the country, that does not have a school uniform.

Many of the current buildings date from the 1980s and are in the neo-brutalist style.

Wellington High School, and the institutions from which the current school evolved, have a significant place in the history of public education in New Zealand.

== History ==
=== Wellington College of Design and Wellington Technical School ===
What is now Wellington High School was founded in 1886 by Arthur Dewhurst Riley as the Wellington College of Design. Riley was a pioneer of technical and vocational education in New Zealand and his views influenced the Manual and Technical Instruction Act of 1900.

The college was the first technical school in New Zealand, teaching teenage students who had entered the workforce after primary school. Classes were trade focused and held in the evenings. Students paid a fee to attend.

In 1891 the school became Wellington Technical School and it moved to its present site on Taranaki Street from Wakefield Street in 1922, under the supervision of its director, John Henry Howell.

=== Wellington Polytechnic ===
In 1964 the secondary and tertiary education parts separated. The tertiary part became Wellington Polytechnical School. Wellington Polytech has now become Massey University's Wellington Campus. Other technical schools have also gone on to become tertiary institutions, including Auckland University of Technology and Nelson Marlborough Institute of Technology.

=== Wellington High School ===
The secondary school retains a large community education programme.

In 2014, an additional Māori name was chosen to sit alongside Wellington High School; "Te Kura Tuarua o Taraika ki Pukeahu". Māori language students were involved in the planning and implementation of the additional name. Taraika is the name of the school's marae. Pukeahu is the area of land on which the school stands. The students presented their idea to the school’s whānau group, Te Whānau a Taraika and the school’s Board of Trustees as well as consultation undertaken with local mana whenua, Taranaki Whānui ki te Upoko o te Ika. The additional name was formally adopted at the school's annual Whakanuia celebration in October 2014.

== Current affairs ==
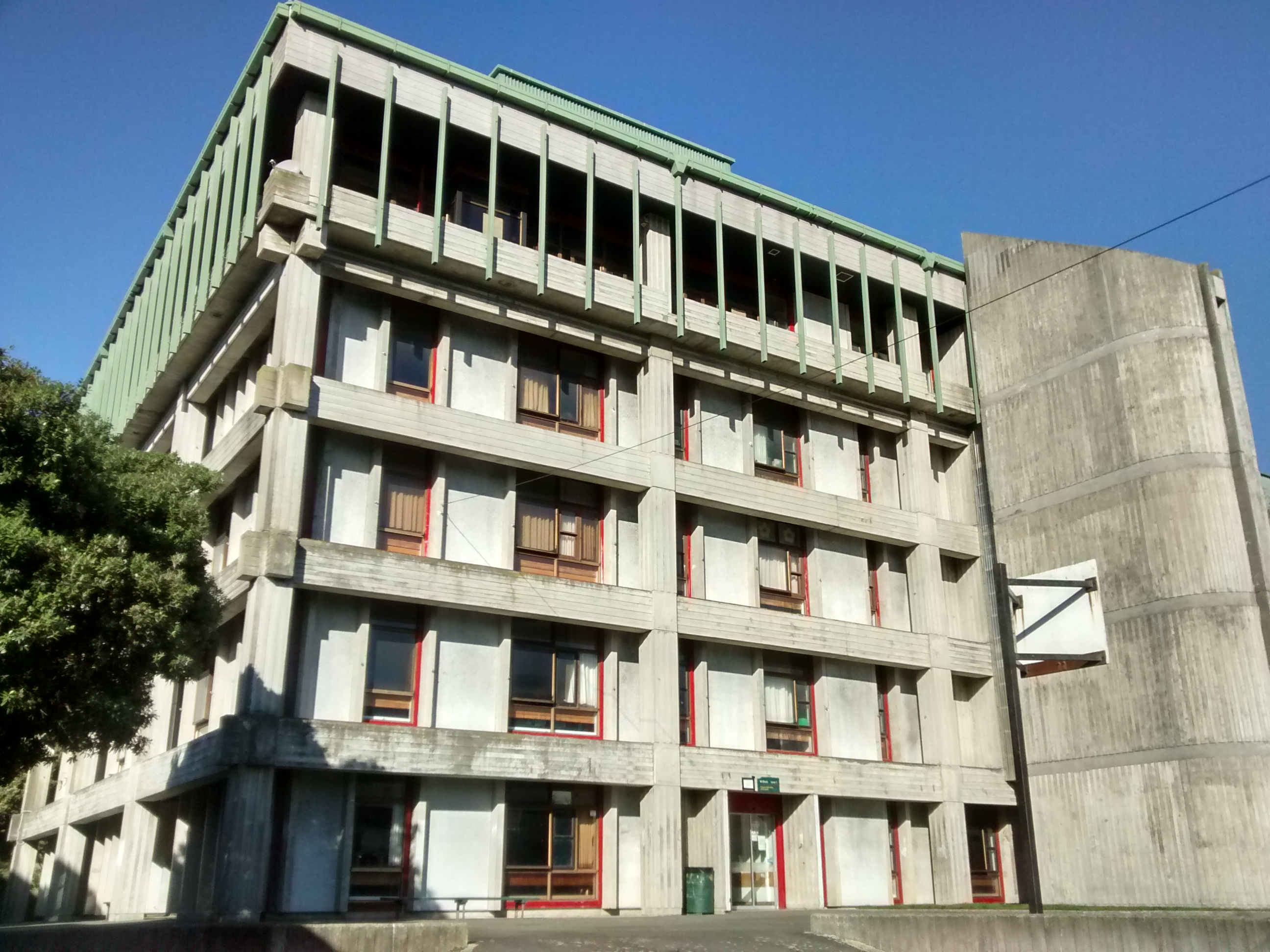
The neo-brutalist architecture of WHS

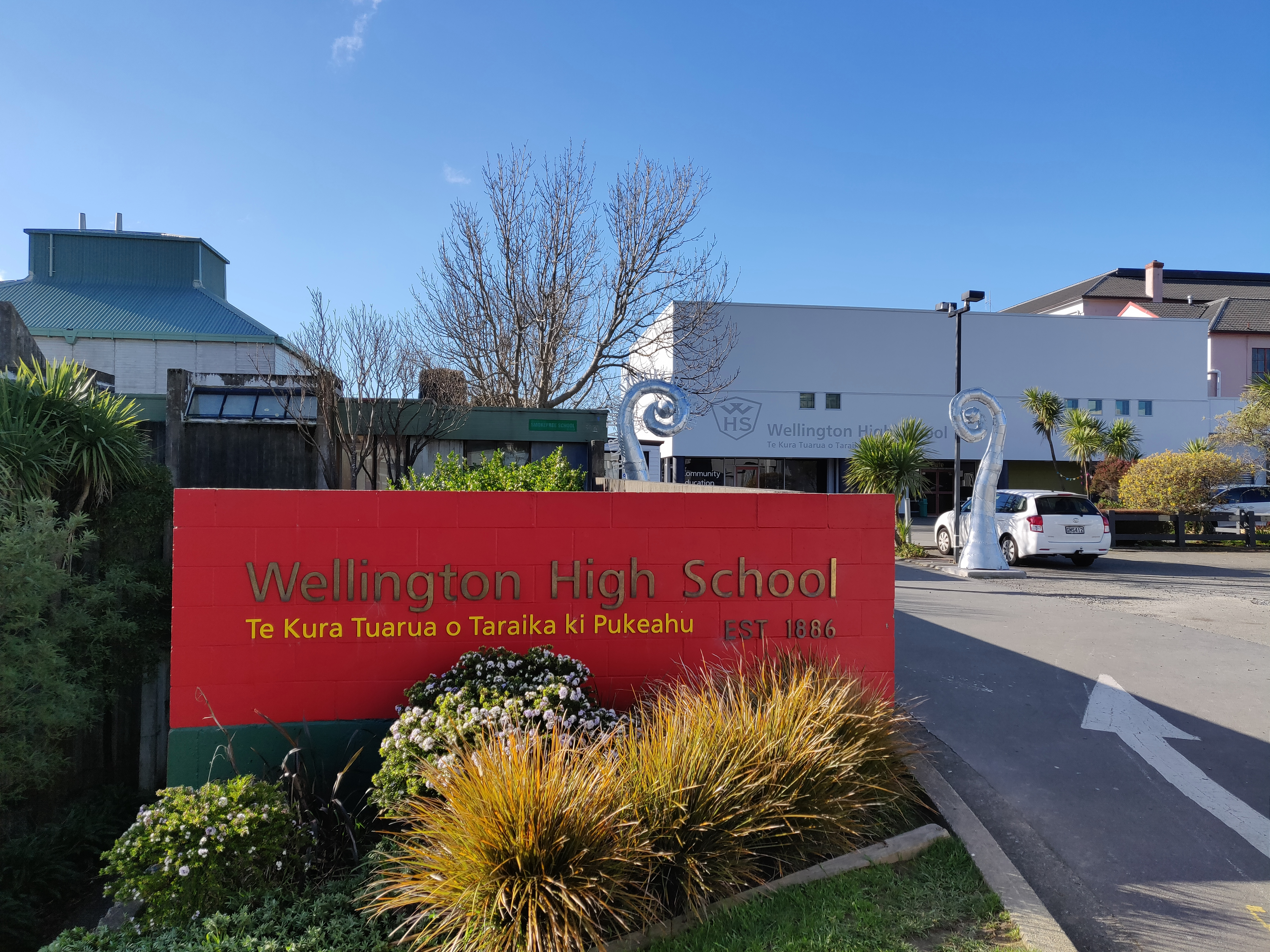
The entrance to Wellington High School

The School was New Zealand Trade and Enterprise Export Awards Education Exporter of the Year 2004.

In 2004, the school made the national headlines when students campaigned for the eviction of the Wellington branch of the Destiny Church, which was using the school hall for its services, with over 50% of enrolled students signing their names to a petition.

In 2006, in response to research on Wellington High students, and an award-winning student video, Principal Prue Kelly introduced a scheme which allows senior students' first classes to begin at 10:20am (as opposed to 8:45am). This issue received much media coverage, and generated little controversy. Principal Prue Kelly was confident that this progressive trial in timetable restructuring would "catch on" and other schools would begin to adopt it as well. As well as the senior 10 o'clock start, all years receive a late start on Tuesdays.

In 2016, Wellington High became the first school in Wellington to provide gender-neutral toilets. WHS converted one floor's separate single sex bathrooms to two sets of gender-neutral bathrooms. The urinals were removed from the boys' bathrooms, and bins added. Signage simply says 'bathroom.' Significant media coverage surrounded the change, and WHS released a media release requesting that the media accept the privacy of students, writing that they are now "getting on with the business of learning." Later in 2016, Onslow College converted a block of their toilets to gender-neutral.

On 5 September 2025 major renovations began. Naylor Love was contracted to build a 3 story science classroom block "1" with 16 new Science and Technology classrooms, and a new carpark on Tory street. Construction began in 2026 on the site of the upper carpark, with a projected finish of early 2027. This is the first phase of a proposed rebuild for the school, which has only been partially funded.

== Radio station ==
The school had a student-run radio station, LiveWire, which transmitted at 107.1. It had a range of approximately 4 km. The radio station ceased broadcasting at the end of 2007. In February 2011, the radio station was revived as High-Fi FM. It was operated by students from the school. The radio station retained previous specifications of a 4 km broadcast range and ran 24/7 on 107.3FM.

In August 2025, it was once again brought back as Fly On The Wall, broadcast on Wellington Access Radio at 6pm on Thursdays.

== Board of trustees ==
The Wellington High School board consists of eleven appointed and elected members, including one representative elected by the student base. It is currently chaired by David Cooling.

== Notable alumni ==
- Matt Benney ISO – civil servant and politician
- Ken Blackburn – actor, director
- Craig Bradshaw – sportsman, Tall Blacks and Winthrop University
- Luke Buda – musician, Phoenix Foundation
- Samuel Flynn Scott – musician, Phoenix Foundation
- Ben Hazlewood – Singer
- Timothy Hyde – magician and writer
- Eddie Johnston – musician, Race Banyon and Lontalius
- Karen O'Leary - early childhood educator, comedian and television and film actress
- King Kapisi – musician
- Helen Kelly – President of the New Zealand Council of Trade Unions
- Paul Eagle – Former Deputy Mayor of Wellington City, MP for Rongotai.
- Tom Larkin – musician, Shihad
- Sir Peter Leitch – The Mad Butcher
- Len Lye – artist, attended evening art classes at Wellington Technical College (now Wellington High School)
- Robert Miller – Known as Bushwhacker Butch, one half of professional wrestling team The Bushwhackers.
- Willy Moon – Singer and former X Factor New Zealand judge
- Nigel Priestley ONZM – earthquake engineer, professor at University of California
- Chelsie Preston Crayford – actress
- James Shaw – Former co-leader of New Zealand's Green Party
- Maud Winifred Sherwood – artist
- Eric Tindill – sportsman, double All Black – cricket and rugby
- Grant Tilly – actor, Downstage Theatre, Unity Theatre, films and television
- Jon Toogood – musician, Shihad
- Sir Jon Trimmer KNZM – ballet dancer
- Roland Wakelin – artist regarded as a founder of modern art movement in Australia
- Dan Weekes-Hannah – actor
- Tandi Wright – actress, Shortland Street and Out of the Blue
- Solo Tohi – Part of the Australian/ NZ break dance crew Justice Crew that won 2010 Australia's Got Talent
- Eva McGauley (1999–2018) – Activist, founder and CEO of www.Evaswish.com. Established an online charity for those who are victims of sexual harm
